= List of vertebrate fauna of the Maastrichtian stage =

This is an incomplete list that briefly describes vertebrates that were extant during the Maastrichtian, a stage of the Late Cretaceous Period which extended from 72.1 to 66 million years before present. This was the last time period in which non-avian dinosaurs, pterosaurs, plesiosaurs, and mosasaurs existed.

== Amphibians ==
†Amphibians of the Maastrichtian
Taxa	Presence	Location	Description	Images
†Albanerpeton; †Albanerpeton galaktion; †Albanerpeton gracilis; †Albanerpeton nexuosus	105.3–65.043 Ma, Albian to Maastrichtian	Canada USA	A salamander-like albanerpetontid that thrived in North America and Europe from the Early Cretaceous to the late Pliocene.	Albanerpeton nexuosus Beelzebufo
†Beelzebufo; †Beelzebufo ampinga	70 Ma	Maevarano Formation, Mahajanga Province, Madagascar	A horned frog. The largest frog to ever live, known to have grown to over 40 cm (16 in) and 4 kg (8.8 lb).	Albanerpeton nexuosus Beelzebufo
†Habrosaurus; †Habrosaurus dilatus	Maastrichtian to Danian	Lance Formation, Wyoming, USA Hell Creek Formation, Montana, USA	A large sirenid, about the size of a hellbender. The palate is specialized for crushing, suggesting it may have fed on hard-bodied prey.	Albanerpeton nexuosus Beelzebufo
†Paranecturus; †Paranecturus garbanii		Hell Creek Formation, Montana USA	A proteid closely related to the modern mudpuppies.	Albanerpeton nexuosus Beelzebufo
†Piceoerpeton; †Piceoerpeton naylori	Maastrichtian to Thanetian	Wyoming & Montana, USA	A scapherpetontid salamander, one of the largest-known salamanders.	Albanerpeton nexuosus Beelzebufo
†Scotiophryne; †Scotiophryne pustulosa	125–60.5 Ma, Aptian to Selandian	Hell Creek Formation, Montana, USA Mexico: Saskatchewan, Canada	A little-known frog.	Albanerpeton nexuosus Beelzebufo

== Dinosaurs ==
=== †Ornithischians ===
==== †Ankylosaurs ====
†Ankylosaurs of the Maastrichtian
Taxa	Presence	Location	Description	Images
†Ankylosaurus; †Ankylosaurus magniventris	68.5–66 Ma	Hell Creek Formation, Montana, USA	An ankylosaurine ankylosaurid. The largest-known ankylosaur, estimated at 9 m (30 ft) and up to 6 tonnes (13,000 lb).	Ankylosaurus Antarctopelta Edmontonia longiceps Tarchia
†Anodontosaurus; †Anodontosaurus lambei	72.8–67 Ma, Campanian to Maastrichtian	Horseshoe Canyon Formation, Alberta, Canada	A medium-sized ankylosaurine ankylosaurid with a wide, pointed tail club.	Ankylosaurus Antarctopelta Edmontonia longiceps Tarchia
†Antarctopelta; †Antarctopelta oliveroi	74–70 Ma, Campanian to Maastrichtian	Santa Marta Formation, James Ross Island, Antarctica	A medium-sized parankylosaur, reaching no more than 4 m (13 ft) in length, with characteristics of both polacanthids and nodosaurs.	Ankylosaurus Antarctopelta Edmontonia longiceps Tarchia
†Brachypodosaurus; †Brachypodosaurus gravis	66 Ma	Lameta Formation, India	An ankylosaur, originally described as a stegosaur.	Ankylosaurus Antarctopelta Edmontonia longiceps Tarchia
†Denversaurus; †Denversaurus schlessmani	68–66 Ma	Lance Formation, South Dakota, USA	An ankylosaur, originally described as a species of Edmontonia	Ankylosaurus Antarctopelta Edmontonia longiceps Tarchia
†Edmontonia; †Edmontonia longiceps; †Edmontonia schlessmani	76.5–69 Ma, Campanian to Maastrichtian	Horseshoe Canyon Formation, Alberta, Canada Lance Formation, Wyoming, USA: St. Mary River Formation, Alberta, Canada	A nodosaur estimated to be roughly 6.6 m (22 ft) long.	Ankylosaurus Antarctopelta Edmontonia longiceps Tarchia
†Glyptodontopelta; †Glyptodontopelta mimus	69–66 Ma	Ojo Alamo Formation, New Mexico, USA	A nodosaur once thought to be a species of Edmontonia.	Ankylosaurus Antarctopelta Edmontonia longiceps Tarchia
†Patagopelta; †Patagopelta cristata	73-69 Ma, Campanian to Maastrichtian	Allen Formation, Argentina	A small nodosaur, the first euankylosaur from South America	Ankylosaurus Antarctopelta Edmontonia longiceps Tarchia
†Shanxia; †Shanxia tianzhenensis	99-71 Ma, Cenomanian to Maastrichtian	Huiquanpu Formation, Shanxi, China	An ankylosaurine ankylosaurid which a few scientists consider a possible synonym of Tianzhenosaurus.	Ankylosaurus Antarctopelta Edmontonia longiceps Tarchia
†Stegouros; †Stegouros elengassen	74–71 Ma, Campanian to Maastrichtian	Dorotea Formation, Chile	A small-sized Parankylosaur.	Ankylosaurus Antarctopelta Edmontonia longiceps Tarchia
†Struthiosaurus; †Struthiosaurus austriacus; †Struthiosaurus languedocensis; †Struthiosaurus transylvanicus	85–66 Ma, Santonian to Maastrichtian	Sanpetru Formation, Hunedoara County, Romania	A struthiosaurine nodosaur, one of the smallest-known and most basal nodosaurs from the Late Cretaceous.	Ankylosaurus Antarctopelta Edmontonia longiceps Tarchia
†Tarchia; †Tarchia kailanae	84.9–70.6 Ma, Santonian to Maastrichtian	Barun Goyot Formation, Ömnögovi Province, Mongolia	An ankylosaurine ankylosaurid, and one of the geologically youngest-known Asian ankylosaurs. It has an estimated body length of 8 to 8.5 meters (26 to 28 ft) and weighing as much as 4.5 tonnes (5.0 short tons).	Ankylosaurus Antarctopelta Edmontonia longiceps Tarchia
†Tianzhenosaurus; †Tianzhenosaurus youngi	99–70.6 Ma, Cenomanian to Maastrichtian	Huiquanpu Formation, Shanxi, China	An ankylosaurine ankylosaurid. Suggested by some to be a junior synonym of Saichania.	Ankylosaurus Antarctopelta Edmontonia longiceps Tarchia

==== †Parksosauridae ====
†Thescelosaurids of the Maastrichtian
Taxa	Presence	Location	Description	Images
†Parksosaurus; 1. †Parksosaurus warreni	70 Ma	Horseshoe Canyon Formation, Alberta, Canada	A parksosaur that is one of the few basal neornithischians from the end of the Cretaceous.	Parksosaurus Thescelosaurus neglectus
†Thescelosaurus; 1. †Thescelosaurus garbanii 2. †Thescelosaurus neglectus 3. †Thescelosaurus assiniboiensis	68–66 Ma	Hell Creek Formation, South Dakota, USA Scollard Formation, Alberta, Canada	A parksosaur known from several partial skeletons.	Parksosaurus Thescelosaurus neglectus

==== †Ornithopoda ====
†Ornithopods and †Hypsilophodonts of the Maastrichtian
Taxa	Presence	Location	Description	Images
†Adynomosaurus; 1. †Adynomosaurus arcanus	72-70 Ma	Tremp Formation, Spain	A lambeosaurine hadrosaur	Barsboldia Canardia Edmontosaurus regalis Edmontosaurus annectens Gryposaurus Kamuysaurus Kritosaurus Olorotitan Pararhabdodon Rhabdodon priscus Riabininohadros Sahaliyania Saurolophus angustirostris Shantungosaurus Trinisaura Tsintaosaurus Zalmoxes
†Amurosaurus; 1. †Amurosaurus riabinini	70-66 Ma	Udurchukan Formation, China, Russia	A lambeosaurine hadrosaur	Barsboldia Canardia Edmontosaurus regalis Edmontosaurus annectens Gryposaurus Kamuysaurus Kritosaurus Olorotitan Pararhabdodon Rhabdodon priscus Riabininohadros Sahaliyania Saurolophus angustirostris Shantungosaurus Trinisaura Tsintaosaurus Zalmoxes
†Arenysaurus; 1. †Arenysaurus ardevoli	66 Ma	Spain	A lambeosaurine hadrosaur	Barsboldia Canardia Edmontosaurus regalis Edmontosaurus annectens Gryposaurus Kamuysaurus Kritosaurus Olorotitan Pararhabdodon Rhabdodon priscus Riabininohadros Sahaliyania Saurolophus angustirostris Shantungosaurus Trinisaura Tsintaosaurus Zalmoxes
†Augustynolophus; 1. †Augustynolophus morrisi	70–66 Ma	Moreno Formation, California, USA	A saurolophine hadrosaur originally thought to be a species of Saurolophus.	Barsboldia Canardia Edmontosaurus regalis Edmontosaurus annectens Gryposaurus Kamuysaurus Kritosaurus Olorotitan Pararhabdodon Rhabdodon priscus Riabininohadros Sahaliyania Saurolophus angustirostris Shantungosaurus Trinisaura Tsintaosaurus Zalmoxes
†Barsboldia; 1. †Barsboldia sicinskii	70 Ma	Nemegt Formation, Omnogovi Province, Mongolia	A hadrosaur originally described as a lambeosaurine, now believed to instead be a saurolophine.	Barsboldia Canardia Edmontosaurus regalis Edmontosaurus annectens Gryposaurus Kamuysaurus Kritosaurus Olorotitan Pararhabdodon Rhabdodon priscus Riabininohadros Sahaliyania Saurolophus angustirostris Shantungosaurus Trinisaura Tsintaosaurus Zalmoxes
†Blasisaurus; 1. †Blasisaurus canudoi	66 Ma	Aren Formation, Spain	A medium-sized lambeosaurine hadrosaur	Barsboldia Canardia Edmontosaurus regalis Edmontosaurus annectens Gryposaurus Kamuysaurus Kritosaurus Olorotitan Pararhabdodon Rhabdodon priscus Riabininohadros Sahaliyania Saurolophus angustirostris Shantungosaurus Trinisaura Tsintaosaurus Zalmoxes
†Canardia; 1. †Canardia garonnensis	67.5–66 Ma	Marnes d'Auzas Formation, Haute-Garonne, France	A recently found lambeosaurine hadrosaur.	Barsboldia Canardia Edmontosaurus regalis Edmontosaurus annectens Gryposaurus Kamuysaurus Kritosaurus Olorotitan Pararhabdodon Rhabdodon priscus Riabininohadros Sahaliyania Saurolophus angustirostris Shantungosaurus Trinisaura Tsintaosaurus Zalmoxes
†Charonosaurus; 1. †Charonosaurus jiayinensis	66 Ma	Yuliangze Formation, Heilongjiang, China	A lambeosaurine hadrosaur appearing similar in skull shape to Parasaurolophus. It was a very large lambeosaurine, with an estimated length of around 10 m (33 ft) long.	Barsboldia Canardia Edmontosaurus regalis Edmontosaurus annectens Gryposaurus Kamuysaurus Kritosaurus Olorotitan Pararhabdodon Rhabdodon priscus Riabininohadros Sahaliyania Saurolophus angustirostris Shantungosaurus Trinisaura Tsintaosaurus Zalmoxes
†Edmontosaurus; 1. †Edmontosaurus regalis 2. †Edmontosaurus annectens	73–66 Ma, Campanian to Maastrichtian	Hell Creek Formation, Montana, USA Laramie Formation, Colorado, USA: Horseshoe Canyon Formation, Alberta, Canada; Frenchman Formation, Saskatchewan, Canada	A well-known genus of saurolophine hadrosaur. E. annectens has been previously named Anatosaurus and Anatotitan. This was one of the largest hadrosaurids, measuring up to 12 m (39 ft) long and weighing around 4.0 metric tons (4.4 short tons).	Barsboldia Canardia Edmontosaurus regalis Edmontosaurus annectens Gryposaurus Kamuysaurus Kritosaurus Olorotitan Pararhabdodon Rhabdodon priscus Riabininohadros Sahaliyania Saurolophus angustirostris Shantungosaurus Trinisaura Tsintaosaurus Zalmoxes
†Gilmoreosaurus; 1. †Gilmoreosaurus mongoliensis	70 Ma	Iren Dabasu Formation, Inner Mongolia, China	A hadrosauroid originally assigned as a species of Mandschurosaurus.	Barsboldia Canardia Edmontosaurus regalis Edmontosaurus annectens Gryposaurus Kamuysaurus Kritosaurus Olorotitan Pararhabdodon Rhabdodon priscus Riabininohadros Sahaliyania Saurolophus angustirostris Shantungosaurus Trinisaura Tsintaosaurus Zalmoxes
†Gryposaurus; 1. †Gryposaurus notabilis 2. †Gryposaurus latidens 3. †Gryposaurus monumentensis 4. †Gryposaurus alsatei?	83–74 Ma	Dinosaur Park Formation, Alberta, Canada Two Medicine Formation, Montana, USA Kaiparowits Formation, Utah, USA		Barsboldia Canardia Edmontosaurus regalis Edmontosaurus annectens Gryposaurus Kamuysaurus Kritosaurus Olorotitan Pararhabdodon Rhabdodon priscus Riabininohadros Sahaliyania Saurolophus angustirostris Shantungosaurus Trinisaura Tsintaosaurus Zalmoxes
†Huaxiaosaurus; 1. †Huaxiaosaurus aigahtens	70 Ma	Xingzhuang Formation, Shandong, China	A large saurolophine hadrosaur, some of its estimated dimensions include a length of 18.7 m (61 ft) and a height of 11.3 m (37 ft) (in a tripodal posture) makes it one of the largest ornithopods known.	Barsboldia Canardia Edmontosaurus regalis Edmontosaurus annectens Gryposaurus Kamuysaurus Kritosaurus Olorotitan Pararhabdodon Rhabdodon priscus Riabininohadros Sahaliyania Saurolophus angustirostris Shantungosaurus Trinisaura Tsintaosaurus Zalmoxes
†Hypacrosaurus; 1. †Hypacrosaurus altispinus	75–67 Ma, Campanian to Maastrichtian	Horseshoe Canyon Formation, Alberta, Canada	A lambeosaurine hadrosaur that has a tall, hollow rounded crest similar to Corythosaurus. The animal is estimated to have been around 9.1 m (30 ft) long, and to have weighed up to 4.0 tonnes (4.4 tons).	Barsboldia Canardia Edmontosaurus regalis Edmontosaurus annectens Gryposaurus Kamuysaurus Kritosaurus Olorotitan Pararhabdodon Rhabdodon priscus Riabininohadros Sahaliyania Saurolophus angustirostris Shantungosaurus Trinisaura Tsintaosaurus Zalmoxes
†Kamuysaurus; 1. †Kamuysaurus japonicus	72.4-70.6 Ma	Hakobucho Formation, Mukawa, Hokkaido, Japan	An Edmontosaurini Saurolophine	Barsboldia Canardia Edmontosaurus regalis Edmontosaurus annectens Gryposaurus Kamuysaurus Kritosaurus Olorotitan Pararhabdodon Rhabdodon priscus Riabininohadros Sahaliyania Saurolophus angustirostris Shantungosaurus Trinisaura Tsintaosaurus Zalmoxes
†Kerberosaurus; 1. †Kerberosaurus manakini	66 Ma	Udurchukan Formation, Amur Oblast, Russia	A saurolophine hadrosaur.	Barsboldia Canardia Edmontosaurus regalis Edmontosaurus annectens Gryposaurus Kamuysaurus Kritosaurus Olorotitan Pararhabdodon Rhabdodon priscus Riabininohadros Sahaliyania Saurolophus angustirostris Shantungosaurus Trinisaura Tsintaosaurus Zalmoxes
†Koutalisaurus; 1. †Kerberosaurus manakini	67.5–66 Ma	Tremp Formation, Province of Lleida, Catalonia, Spain	A lambeosaurine hadrosaur	Barsboldia Canardia Edmontosaurus regalis Edmontosaurus annectens Gryposaurus Kamuysaurus Kritosaurus Olorotitan Pararhabdodon Rhabdodon priscus Riabininohadros Sahaliyania Saurolophus angustirostris Shantungosaurus Trinisaura Tsintaosaurus Zalmoxes
†Kritosaurus; 1. †Kritosaurus navajovius	74–66 Ma, Campanian to Maastrichtian	Kirtland Formation, New Mexico, USA	A saurolophine hadrosaur	Barsboldia Canardia Edmontosaurus regalis Edmontosaurus annectens Gryposaurus Kamuysaurus Kritosaurus Olorotitan Pararhabdodon Rhabdodon priscus Riabininohadros Sahaliyania Saurolophus angustirostris Shantungosaurus Trinisaura Tsintaosaurus Zalmoxes
†Kundurosaurus; 1. †Kundurosaurus nagornyi	67–66 Ma	Udurchukan Formation, Amur Oblast, Russia	A saurolophine hadrosaur	Barsboldia Canardia Edmontosaurus regalis Edmontosaurus annectens Gryposaurus Kamuysaurus Kritosaurus Olorotitan Pararhabdodon Rhabdodon priscus Riabininohadros Sahaliyania Saurolophus angustirostris Shantungosaurus Trinisaura Tsintaosaurus Zalmoxes
†Lapampasaurus; 1. †Lapampasaurus cholinoi	76–70 Ma, Campanian to Maastrichtian	Allen Formation, La Pampa Province, Argentina	A hadrosaur named in honor the late collector Jose Cholino. It is one of the few hadrosaurs to live in Gondwana.	Barsboldia Canardia Edmontosaurus regalis Edmontosaurus annectens Gryposaurus Kamuysaurus Kritosaurus Olorotitan Pararhabdodon Rhabdodon priscus Riabininohadros Sahaliyania Saurolophus angustirostris Shantungosaurus Trinisaura Tsintaosaurus Zalmoxes
†Mandschurosaurus; 1. †Mandschurosaurus amurensis 2. †Mandschurosaurus laosensis	66 Ma	Yuliangze Formation, Heilongjiang, China	A poorly-known hadrosaur.	Barsboldia Canardia Edmontosaurus regalis Edmontosaurus annectens Gryposaurus Kamuysaurus Kritosaurus Olorotitan Pararhabdodon Rhabdodon priscus Riabininohadros Sahaliyania Saurolophus angustirostris Shantungosaurus Trinisaura Tsintaosaurus Zalmoxes
†Microhadrosaurus; 1. †Microhadrosaurus nanshiungensis		Nanxiong Formation, Guangdong, China	A hadrosaur based on juvenile remains.	Barsboldia Canardia Edmontosaurus regalis Edmontosaurus annectens Gryposaurus Kamuysaurus Kritosaurus Olorotitan Pararhabdodon Rhabdodon priscus Riabininohadros Sahaliyania Saurolophus angustirostris Shantungosaurus Trinisaura Tsintaosaurus Zalmoxes
†Morrosaurus; 1. †Morrosaurus antarcticus	70–66 Ma	Snow Hill Island Formation, James Ross Island, Antarctica	An elasmarian iguanodont that was a medium-sized animal. The descriptors were able to establish some distinctive features. Two of these are autapomorphies, i.e. derived features that are unique. In bottom view, the greater trochanter of the femur has an undulating profile with a thick edge output and a main thin edge. The fourth metatarsal bone has a triangular profile with a rearward projection that wraps around her and the third metatarsal. In addition, there is a unique combination of two features that by themselves are not unique features. In the femur, the lesser trochanter is inclined diagonally, right next to the greater trochanter. In the tibia, medial malleolus has a triangular outline view showing a front concave surface.	Barsboldia Canardia Edmontosaurus regalis Edmontosaurus annectens Gryposaurus Kamuysaurus Kritosaurus Olorotitan Pararhabdodon Rhabdodon priscus Riabininohadros Sahaliyania Saurolophus angustirostris Shantungosaurus Trinisaura Tsintaosaurus Zalmoxes
†Nanningosaurus; 1. †Nanningosaurus dashiensis	72.1–66 Ma, Maastrichtian	Guangxi, China	A lambeosaurine hadrosaur known from an incomplete skeleton including skull, arm, and hip remains. The first hadrosaur discovered in southern China.	Barsboldia Canardia Edmontosaurus regalis Edmontosaurus annectens Gryposaurus Kamuysaurus Kritosaurus Olorotitan Pararhabdodon Rhabdodon priscus Riabininohadros Sahaliyania Saurolophus angustirostris Shantungosaurus Trinisaura Tsintaosaurus Zalmoxes
†Olorotitan; 1. †Olorotitan arhanensis	72–66 Ma	durchukan Formation, Amur Oblast, Russia	A lambeosaurine hadrosaur.	Barsboldia Canardia Edmontosaurus regalis Edmontosaurus annectens Gryposaurus Kamuysaurus Kritosaurus Olorotitan Pararhabdodon Rhabdodon priscus Riabininohadros Sahaliyania Saurolophus angustirostris Shantungosaurus Trinisaura Tsintaosaurus Zalmoxes
†Orthomerus; 1. †Orthomerus dolloi	66 Ma	Maastricht Formation, Limburg, Netherlands Belgium	An obscure genus of hadrosaur. In the past it was conflated with the much better known Telmatosaurus.	Barsboldia Canardia Edmontosaurus regalis Edmontosaurus annectens Gryposaurus Kamuysaurus Kritosaurus Olorotitan Pararhabdodon Rhabdodon priscus Riabininohadros Sahaliyania Saurolophus angustirostris Shantungosaurus Trinisaura Tsintaosaurus Zalmoxes
†Pararhabdodon; 1. †Pararhabdodon isonensis	67.5–66 Ma	Tremp Formation, province of Lleida, Catalonia, Spain	A lamebosaurine hadrosaur	Barsboldia Canardia Edmontosaurus regalis Edmontosaurus annectens Gryposaurus Kamuysaurus Kritosaurus Olorotitan Pararhabdodon Rhabdodon priscus Riabininohadros Sahaliyania Saurolophus angustirostris Shantungosaurus Trinisaura Tsintaosaurus Zalmoxes
†Pareisactus; 1. †Pareisactus evrostos	67.5–66 Ma	Spain	A rhabdodontid known from a scapula.	Barsboldia Canardia Edmontosaurus regalis Edmontosaurus annectens Gryposaurus Kamuysaurus Kritosaurus Olorotitan Pararhabdodon Rhabdodon priscus Riabininohadros Sahaliyania Saurolophus angustirostris Shantungosaurus Trinisaura Tsintaosaurus Zalmoxes
†Rhabdodon; 1. †Rhabdodon priscus	70–66 Ma	Romania Spain: France; Czech Republic	A rhabdodontid common in Cretaceous Europe.	Barsboldia Canardia Edmontosaurus regalis Edmontosaurus annectens Gryposaurus Kamuysaurus Kritosaurus Olorotitan Pararhabdodon Rhabdodon priscus Riabininohadros Sahaliyania Saurolophus angustirostris Shantungosaurus Trinisaura Tsintaosaurus Zalmoxes
†Riabininohadros; 1. †Riabininohadros weberae	72–66 Ma	Ukraine	A genus of styracosternan ankylopollexian that was unearthed in Ukraine.	Barsboldia Canardia Edmontosaurus regalis Edmontosaurus annectens Gryposaurus Kamuysaurus Kritosaurus Olorotitan Pararhabdodon Rhabdodon priscus Riabininohadros Sahaliyania Saurolophus angustirostris Shantungosaurus Trinisaura Tsintaosaurus Zalmoxes
†Sahaliyania; 1. †Sahaliyania elunchunorum	68–66 Ma	Yuliangze Formation, Heilongjiang, China	A lambeosaurine hadrosaur known only from a few remains.	Barsboldia Canardia Edmontosaurus regalis Edmontosaurus annectens Gryposaurus Kamuysaurus Kritosaurus Olorotitan Pararhabdodon Rhabdodon priscus Riabininohadros Sahaliyania Saurolophus angustirostris Shantungosaurus Trinisaura Tsintaosaurus Zalmoxes
†Saurolophus; 1. †Saurolophus angustirostris 2. †Saurolophus osborni	70–66 Ma	Nemegt Formation, Omnogovi Province, Mongolia Horseshoe Canyon Formation, Alberta, Canada	A saurolophine hadrosaur distinguished by a spike-like cranial crest.	Barsboldia Canardia Edmontosaurus regalis Edmontosaurus annectens Gryposaurus Kamuysaurus Kritosaurus Olorotitan Pararhabdodon Rhabdodon priscus Riabininohadros Sahaliyania Saurolophus angustirostris Shantungosaurus Trinisaura Tsintaosaurus Zalmoxes
†Secernosaurus; 1. †Secernosaurus koerneri		Argentina	A saurolophine hadrosaur once considered to be a species of Kritosaurus. It is one of the few Gondwanan hadrosaurs.	Barsboldia Canardia Edmontosaurus regalis Edmontosaurus annectens Gryposaurus Kamuysaurus Kritosaurus Olorotitan Pararhabdodon Rhabdodon priscus Riabininohadros Sahaliyania Saurolophus angustirostris Shantungosaurus Trinisaura Tsintaosaurus Zalmoxes
†Sektensaurus; 1. †Sektensaurus sanjuanboscoi	80–66 Ma	Lago Colhué Huapí Formation, Patagonia, Argentina	A possible elasmarian ornithopod from Patagonia. The first non-hadrosaurid ornithopod of central Patagonia.	Barsboldia Canardia Edmontosaurus regalis Edmontosaurus annectens Gryposaurus Kamuysaurus Kritosaurus Olorotitan Pararhabdodon Rhabdodon priscus Riabininohadros Sahaliyania Saurolophus angustirostris Shantungosaurus Trinisaura Tsintaosaurus Zalmoxes
†Shantungosaurus; 1. †Shantungosaurus giganteus	70 Ma	Wangshi Group, Shandong, China	A saurolophine hadrosaur, the largest-known Hadrosaur, and one of the largest-known ornithischians, estimated to be over 14.72 m (48.3 ft) in length and weighing as much as 16 tonnes (18 short tons).	Barsboldia Canardia Edmontosaurus regalis Edmontosaurus annectens Gryposaurus Kamuysaurus Kritosaurus Olorotitan Pararhabdodon Rhabdodon priscus Riabininohadros Sahaliyania Saurolophus angustirostris Shantungosaurus Trinisaura Tsintaosaurus Zalmoxes
†Telmatosaurus; 1. †Telmatosaurus transsylvanicus	70–66 Ma	Sanpetru Formation, Hunedoara County, Romania	A relatively small hadrosaur, approximately 5 m (16 ft) long.	Barsboldia Canardia Edmontosaurus regalis Edmontosaurus annectens Gryposaurus Kamuysaurus Kritosaurus Olorotitan Pararhabdodon Rhabdodon priscus Riabininohadros Sahaliyania Saurolophus angustirostris Shantungosaurus Trinisaura Tsintaosaurus Zalmoxes
†Tethyshadros; 1. †Tethyshadros insularis	70 Ma	Liburnia Formation, Province of Trieste, Friuli-Venezia Giulia, Italy	A relatively small species of hadrosauroid. It had a length of about 4 m (13 ft) and a weight of 350 kilograms (770 pounds).	Barsboldia Canardia Edmontosaurus regalis Edmontosaurus annectens Gryposaurus Kamuysaurus Kritosaurus Olorotitan Pararhabdodon Rhabdodon priscus Riabininohadros Sahaliyania Saurolophus angustirostris Shantungosaurus Trinisaura Tsintaosaurus Zalmoxes
†Thespesius; 1. †Thespesius occidentalis	66 Ma	Lance Formation, South Dakota, USA	A dubious saurolophine hadrosaur notable for its taxonomic history	Barsboldia Canardia Edmontosaurus regalis Edmontosaurus annectens Gryposaurus Kamuysaurus Kritosaurus Olorotitan Pararhabdodon Rhabdodon priscus Riabininohadros Sahaliyania Saurolophus angustirostris Shantungosaurus Trinisaura Tsintaosaurus Zalmoxes
†Trinisaura; 1. †Trinisaura santamartaensis	80–66 Ma	Snow Hill Island Formation, James Ross Island, Antarctica	An elasmarian iguanodont.	Barsboldia Canardia Edmontosaurus regalis Edmontosaurus annectens Gryposaurus Kamuysaurus Kritosaurus Olorotitan Pararhabdodon Rhabdodon priscus Riabininohadros Sahaliyania Saurolophus angustirostris Shantungosaurus Trinisaura Tsintaosaurus Zalmoxes
†Tsintaosaurus; 1. †Tsintaosaurus spinorhinus	70 Ma	Jingangkou Formation, Shandong, China	A lambeosaurine hadrosaur	Barsboldia Canardia Edmontosaurus regalis Edmontosaurus annectens Gryposaurus Kamuysaurus Kritosaurus Olorotitan Pararhabdodon Rhabdodon priscus Riabininohadros Sahaliyania Saurolophus angustirostris Shantungosaurus Trinisaura Tsintaosaurus Zalmoxes
†Ugrunaaluk; 1. †Ugrunaaluk kuukpikensis	69.2 Ma	Colville River, Alaska, USA	A saurolophine hadrosaur, originally thought to be the bones of juvenile Edmontosaurus regalis.	Barsboldia Canardia Edmontosaurus regalis Edmontosaurus annectens Gryposaurus Kamuysaurus Kritosaurus Olorotitan Pararhabdodon Rhabdodon priscus Riabininohadros Sahaliyania Saurolophus angustirostris Shantungosaurus Trinisaura Tsintaosaurus Zalmoxes
†Velafrons; 1. †Velafrons coahuilensis	72 Ma, Campanian to Maastrichtian	Cerro del Pueblo Formation, Coahuila, Mexico	A lambeosaurine hadrosaur known from a mostly complete skull and partial skeleton of a juvenile individual	Barsboldia Canardia Edmontosaurus regalis Edmontosaurus annectens Gryposaurus Kamuysaurus Kritosaurus Olorotitan Pararhabdodon Rhabdodon priscus Riabininohadros Sahaliyania Saurolophus angustirostris Shantungosaurus Trinisaura Tsintaosaurus Zalmoxes
†Willinakaqe; 1. †Willinakaqe salitralensis	Campanian to Maastrichtian	Allen Formation, La Pamapa Province, Argentina	A saurolophine hadrosaur that had long spines on its pelvis and tail base. One of the few Gondwanan hadrosaurs.	Barsboldia Canardia Edmontosaurus regalis Edmontosaurus annectens Gryposaurus Kamuysaurus Kritosaurus Olorotitan Pararhabdodon Rhabdodon priscus Riabininohadros Sahaliyania Saurolophus angustirostris Shantungosaurus Trinisaura Tsintaosaurus Zalmoxes
†Wulagasaurus; 1. †Wulagasaurus dongi	69-66 Ma	Yuliangze Formation, Heilongjiang, China	A basal saurolophine hadrosaur	Barsboldia Canardia Edmontosaurus regalis Edmontosaurus annectens Gryposaurus Kamuysaurus Kritosaurus Olorotitan Pararhabdodon Rhabdodon priscus Riabininohadros Sahaliyania Saurolophus angustirostris Shantungosaurus Trinisaura Tsintaosaurus Zalmoxes
†Zalmoxes; 1. †Zalmoxes robustus 2. †Zalmoxes shqiperorum	70-66 Ma	Sanpetru Formation, Hunedoara County, Romania Albania	A small but stoutly built rhabdodontid.	Barsboldia Canardia Edmontosaurus regalis Edmontosaurus annectens Gryposaurus Kamuysaurus Kritosaurus Olorotitan Pararhabdodon Rhabdodon priscus Riabininohadros Sahaliyania Saurolophus angustirostris Shantungosaurus Trinisaura Tsintaosaurus Zalmoxes

==== †Ceratopsians ====
†Ceratopsians of the Maastrichtian
Taxa	Presence	Location	Description	Images
†Agathaumas; 1. †Agathaumas sylvestris	66 Ma	Lance Formation, Wyoming, USA	A chasmosaurine ceratopsid, and the first Ceratopsian known to science. Often considered a nomen dubium, provisionally considered a synonym of Triceratops.	Anchiceratops Arrhinoceratops Bravoceratops Coahuilaceratops Eotriceratops Leptoceratops Micropachycephalosaurus Montanoceratops Nedoceratops Ojoceratops Pachyrhinosaurus lakustai Protoceratops andrewsi Sinoceratops Tatankaceratops Torosaurus latus Triceratops horridus Zhuchengceratops
†Anchiceratops; 1. †Anchiceratops ornatus	72–71 Ma	St. Mary River Formation, Alberta, Canada Horseshoe Canyon Formation, Alberta, Canada	A chasmosaurine ceratopsid with a distinctive frill lined with large epioccipitals.	Anchiceratops Arrhinoceratops Bravoceratops Coahuilaceratops Eotriceratops Leptoceratops Micropachycephalosaurus Montanoceratops Nedoceratops Ojoceratops Pachyrhinosaurus lakustai Protoceratops andrewsi Sinoceratops Tatankaceratops Torosaurus latus Triceratops horridus Zhuchengceratops
†Arrhinoceratops; 1. †Arrhinoceratops brachyops	70.6–70 Ma	Horseshoe Canyon Formation, Alberta, Canada	A chasmosaurine ceratopsid	Anchiceratops Arrhinoceratops Bravoceratops Coahuilaceratops Eotriceratops Leptoceratops Micropachycephalosaurus Montanoceratops Nedoceratops Ojoceratops Pachyrhinosaurus lakustai Protoceratops andrewsi Sinoceratops Tatankaceratops Torosaurus latus Triceratops horridus Zhuchengceratops
†Bravoceratops; 1. †Bravoceratops polyphemus	70 Ma	Javelina Formation, Texas, USA	A rare chasmosaurine ceratopsid that may be the sister taxon of Coahuilaceratops	Anchiceratops Arrhinoceratops Bravoceratops Coahuilaceratops Eotriceratops Leptoceratops Micropachycephalosaurus Montanoceratops Nedoceratops Ojoceratops Pachyrhinosaurus lakustai Protoceratops andrewsi Sinoceratops Tatankaceratops Torosaurus latus Triceratops horridus Zhuchengceratops
†Coahuilaceratops; 1. †Coahuilaceratops magnacuerna	72.5–71.4 Ma, Campanian to Maastrichtian	Cerro del Pueblo Formation, Coahuila, Mexico	A chasmosaurine ceratopsid thought to possess among the largest horns of any dinosaur currently known, rivaling those of larger chasmosaurines like Triceratops and Torosaurus.	Anchiceratops Arrhinoceratops Bravoceratops Coahuilaceratops Eotriceratops Leptoceratops Micropachycephalosaurus Montanoceratops Nedoceratops Ojoceratops Pachyrhinosaurus lakustai Protoceratops andrewsi Sinoceratops Tatankaceratops Torosaurus latus Triceratops horridus Zhuchengceratops
†Eotriceratops; 1. †Eotriceratops xerinsularis	68–67.6 Ma	Horseshoe Canyon Formation, Alberta, Canada	One of the largest chasmosaurines and ceratopsians, weighing in at 10 tonnes and measuring 8.5 to 9 meters long	Anchiceratops Arrhinoceratops Bravoceratops Coahuilaceratops Eotriceratops Leptoceratops Micropachycephalosaurus Montanoceratops Nedoceratops Ojoceratops Pachyrhinosaurus lakustai Protoceratops andrewsi Sinoceratops Tatankaceratops Torosaurus latus Triceratops horridus Zhuchengceratops
†Gobiceratops; 1. †Gobiceratops minutus	83–69 Ma, Campanian to Maastrichtian	Barun Goyot Formation, Omnogovi Province, Mongolia	A bagaceratopsid known from the skull of a young individual.	Anchiceratops Arrhinoceratops Bravoceratops Coahuilaceratops Eotriceratops Leptoceratops Micropachycephalosaurus Montanoceratops Nedoceratops Ojoceratops Pachyrhinosaurus lakustai Protoceratops andrewsi Sinoceratops Tatankaceratops Torosaurus latus Triceratops horridus Zhuchengceratops
†Lamaceratops; 1. †Lamaceratops tereschenkoi	84.9–70.6 Ma, Santonian to Maastrichtian	Barun Goyot Formation, Omnogovi Province, Mongolia	It is debated whether this is a bagaceratopsid or a protoceratopsid.	Anchiceratops Arrhinoceratops Bravoceratops Coahuilaceratops Eotriceratops Leptoceratops Micropachycephalosaurus Montanoceratops Nedoceratops Ojoceratops Pachyrhinosaurus lakustai Protoceratops andrewsi Sinoceratops Tatankaceratops Torosaurus latus Triceratops horridus Zhuchengceratops
†Leptoceratops; 1. †Leptoceratops gracilis	68.8–66 Ma	Hell Creek Formation, Montana, USA Lance Formation, Alberta, Canada: Scollard Formation, Alberta, Canada	A leptoceratopsid	Anchiceratops Arrhinoceratops Bravoceratops Coahuilaceratops Eotriceratops Leptoceratops Micropachycephalosaurus Montanoceratops Nedoceratops Ojoceratops Pachyrhinosaurus lakustai Protoceratops andrewsi Sinoceratops Tatankaceratops Torosaurus latus Triceratops horridus Zhuchengceratops
†Micropachycephalosaurus; 1. †Micropachycephalosaurus hongtuyanensis	69.5 Ma	Wangshi Group, Shandong, China	A basal ceratopsian, originally thought to be a pachycephalosaur, with the longest generic name of any dinosaur.	Anchiceratops Arrhinoceratops Bravoceratops Coahuilaceratops Eotriceratops Leptoceratops Micropachycephalosaurus Montanoceratops Nedoceratops Ojoceratops Pachyrhinosaurus lakustai Protoceratops andrewsi Sinoceratops Tatankaceratops Torosaurus latus Triceratops horridus Zhuchengceratops
†Montanoceratops; 1. †Montanoceratops cerorhynchos	70 Ma	St. Mary River Formation, Montana, USA	A leptoceratopsid distinguished by the presence of claws instead of hooves and having teeth in its upper jaw instead of a toothless beak.	Anchiceratops Arrhinoceratops Bravoceratops Coahuilaceratops Eotriceratops Leptoceratops Micropachycephalosaurus Montanoceratops Nedoceratops Ojoceratops Pachyrhinosaurus lakustai Protoceratops andrewsi Sinoceratops Tatankaceratops Torosaurus latus Triceratops horridus Zhuchengceratops
†Nedoceratops; 1. †Nedoceratops hatcheri	67–66 Ma	Lance Formation, Wyoming, USA	A chasmosaurine ceratopsid that may be a specimen of Triceratops.	Anchiceratops Arrhinoceratops Bravoceratops Coahuilaceratops Eotriceratops Leptoceratops Micropachycephalosaurus Montanoceratops Nedoceratops Ojoceratops Pachyrhinosaurus lakustai Protoceratops andrewsi Sinoceratops Tatankaceratops Torosaurus latus Triceratops horridus Zhuchengceratops
†Ojoceratops; 1. †Ojoceratops fowleri	68 Ma	Ojo Alamo Formation, New Mexico, USA	A chasmosaurine ceratopsid, possibly synonymous with Triceratops or Eotriceratops.	Anchiceratops Arrhinoceratops Bravoceratops Coahuilaceratops Eotriceratops Leptoceratops Micropachycephalosaurus Montanoceratops Nedoceratops Ojoceratops Pachyrhinosaurus lakustai Protoceratops andrewsi Sinoceratops Tatankaceratops Torosaurus latus Triceratops horridus Zhuchengceratops
†Pachyrhinosaurus; 1. †Pachyrhinosaurus canadensis 2. †Pachyrhinosaurus lakustai 3. †Pachyrhinosaurus perotorum	73.5–68.5 Ma, Campanian to Maastrichtian	St. Mary Formation, Montana, USA Horseshoe Canyon Formation, Alberta, Canada: Prince Creek Formation, Alaska, USA; Wapiti Formation, Alberta, Canada; Bearpaw Formation, Alberta, Canada	A common centrosaurine ceratopsid with large, thick bosses on the skull. The largest Pachyrhinosaurus species were 8 m (26 ft) long. This species is also regarded as the last of the North American centrosaurines before the K/T event.	Anchiceratops Arrhinoceratops Bravoceratops Coahuilaceratops Eotriceratops Leptoceratops Micropachycephalosaurus Montanoceratops Nedoceratops Ojoceratops Pachyrhinosaurus lakustai Protoceratops andrewsi Sinoceratops Tatankaceratops Torosaurus latus Triceratops horridus Zhuchengceratops
†Platyceratops; 1. †Platyceratops tatarinovi	75–71 Ma, Campanian to Maastrichtian	Barun Goyot Formation, Omnogovi Province, Mongolia	A bagaceratopsid, sometimes considered synonymous with Bagaceratops.	Anchiceratops Arrhinoceratops Bravoceratops Coahuilaceratops Eotriceratops Leptoceratops Micropachycephalosaurus Montanoceratops Nedoceratops Ojoceratops Pachyrhinosaurus lakustai Protoceratops andrewsi Sinoceratops Tatankaceratops Torosaurus latus Triceratops horridus Zhuchengceratops
†Polyonax; 1. †Polyonax mortuarinus	66 Ma	Denver Formation, Colorado, USA	A dubious chasmosaurine ceratopsid. It has sometimes been listed as a synonym of Agathaumas or Triceratops.	Anchiceratops Arrhinoceratops Bravoceratops Coahuilaceratops Eotriceratops Leptoceratops Micropachycephalosaurus Montanoceratops Nedoceratops Ojoceratops Pachyrhinosaurus lakustai Protoceratops andrewsi Sinoceratops Tatankaceratops Torosaurus latus Triceratops horridus Zhuchengceratops
†Protoceratops; 1. †Protoceratops andrewsi 2. †Protoceratops hellenikorhinus	83.5–70.6 Ma	Djadochta Formation, Omnogovi Province, Mongolia Bayan Mandahu Formation, Inner Mongolia, China	A common protoceratopsid.	Anchiceratops Arrhinoceratops Bravoceratops Coahuilaceratops Eotriceratops Leptoceratops Micropachycephalosaurus Montanoceratops Nedoceratops Ojoceratops Pachyrhinosaurus lakustai Protoceratops andrewsi Sinoceratops Tatankaceratops Torosaurus latus Triceratops horridus Zhuchengceratops
Regaliceratops; 1. Regaliceratops peterhewsi	68.5–67.5 Ma	St. Mary River Formation, Alberta, Canada	A chasmosaurine ceratopsid named for its plated frill, which its describers thought looked somewhat like a crown.	Anchiceratops Arrhinoceratops Bravoceratops Coahuilaceratops Eotriceratops Leptoceratops Micropachycephalosaurus Montanoceratops Nedoceratops Ojoceratops Pachyrhinosaurus lakustai Protoceratops andrewsi Sinoceratops Tatankaceratops Torosaurus latus Triceratops horridus Zhuchengceratops
†Sierraceratops; 1. †Sierraceratops turneri	72-70 Ma	Hall Lake Formation, New Mexico, USA	A chasmosaurine ceratopsid related to Bravoceratops and Coahuilaceratops.	Anchiceratops Arrhinoceratops Bravoceratops Coahuilaceratops Eotriceratops Leptoceratops Micropachycephalosaurus Montanoceratops Nedoceratops Ojoceratops Pachyrhinosaurus lakustai Protoceratops andrewsi Sinoceratops Tatankaceratops Torosaurus latus Triceratops horridus Zhuchengceratops
†Sinoceratops; 1. †Sinoceratops zhuchengensis	72–70 Ma	Xingezhuang Formation, Shandong, China	A centrosaurine ceratopsid, currently the only known Asian Ceratopsid.	Anchiceratops Arrhinoceratops Bravoceratops Coahuilaceratops Eotriceratops Leptoceratops Micropachycephalosaurus Montanoceratops Nedoceratops Ojoceratops Pachyrhinosaurus lakustai Protoceratops andrewsi Sinoceratops Tatankaceratops Torosaurus latus Triceratops horridus Zhuchengceratops
†Tatankaceratops; 1. †Tatankaceratops sacrisonorum	66 Ma	Hell Creek Formation, South Dakota, USA	A chasmosaurine ceratopsid, probably a juvenile specimen of Triceratops.	Anchiceratops Arrhinoceratops Bravoceratops Coahuilaceratops Eotriceratops Leptoceratops Micropachycephalosaurus Montanoceratops Nedoceratops Ojoceratops Pachyrhinosaurus lakustai Protoceratops andrewsi Sinoceratops Tatankaceratops Torosaurus latus Triceratops horridus Zhuchengceratops
†Torosaurus; 1. †Torosaurus latus 2. †Torosaurus utahensis	68–66 Ma	Lance Formation, Wyoming, USA Hell Creek Formation, Montana, USA: North Horn Formation, Utah, USA	A chasmosaurine ceratopsid with one of the largest skulls of any known land animal. Some researchers consider it an ontogenic stage of Triceratops.	Anchiceratops Arrhinoceratops Bravoceratops Coahuilaceratops Eotriceratops Leptoceratops Micropachycephalosaurus Montanoceratops Nedoceratops Ojoceratops Pachyrhinosaurus lakustai Protoceratops andrewsi Sinoceratops Tatankaceratops Torosaurus latus Triceratops horridus Zhuchengceratops
†Triceratops; 1. †Triceratops horridus 2. †Triceratops prorsus	68–66 Ma	Hell Creek Formation, Montana, USA Lance Formation, Wyoming, USA	Possibly the most iconic ceratopsian, Triceratops May have grown up to 6.5 to 12 tonnes and measured 7.5 to 9 meters long.	Anchiceratops Arrhinoceratops Bravoceratops Coahuilaceratops Eotriceratops Leptoceratops Micropachycephalosaurus Montanoceratops Nedoceratops Ojoceratops Pachyrhinosaurus lakustai Protoceratops andrewsi Sinoceratops Tatankaceratops Torosaurus latus Triceratops horridus Zhuchengceratops
†Zhuchengceratops; 1. †Zhuchengceratops inexpectus	70 Ma	Wangshi Group, Shandong, China	A leptoceratopsid slightly larger than most adult specimens of the similar Leptoceratops. It is known from a partial articulated skeleton including vertebrae, ribs, teeth, and parts of the skull and mandibles.	Anchiceratops Arrhinoceratops Bravoceratops Coahuilaceratops Eotriceratops Leptoceratops Micropachycephalosaurus Montanoceratops Nedoceratops Ojoceratops Pachyrhinosaurus lakustai Protoceratops andrewsi Sinoceratops Tatankaceratops Torosaurus latus Triceratops horridus Zhuchengceratops

==== †Pachycephalosaurs ====
†Pachycephalosaurs of the Maastrichtian
Taxa	Presence	Location	Description	Images
†Alaskacephale; 1. †Alaskacephale gangloffi	80–69 Ma, Campanian to Maastrichtian	Prince Creek Formation, Alaska, USA		Alaskacephale Goyocephale Pachycephalosaurus Prenocephale Sphaerotholus Tylocephale
†Dracorex; 1. †Dracorex hogwartsia	66 Ma	Hell Creek Formation, South Dakota, USA	Named as a tribute to both dragons and the Harry Potter book series. Some paleontologists consider it a synonym of Stygimoloch or Pachycephalosaurus.	Alaskacephale Goyocephale Pachycephalosaurus Prenocephale Sphaerotholus Tylocephale
†Goyocephale; 1. †Goyocephale lattimorei	76 Ma, Santonian to Maastrichtian	Nemegt Formation, Omnogovi Province, Mongolia	Formally described from an incomplete skull, mandibles, and fragmentary postcranial material.	Alaskacephale Goyocephale Pachycephalosaurus Prenocephale Sphaerotholus Tylocephale
†Pachycephalosaurus; 1. †Pachycephalosaurus wyomingensis	70–66 Ma	Hell Creek Formation, Montana, USA Lance Formation, Montana, USA	The largest-known pachycephalosaur. It has been estimated that Pachycephalosaurus was around 4.5 m (15 ft) long and weighed 450 kilograms (990 pounds).	Alaskacephale Goyocephale Pachycephalosaurus Prenocephale Sphaerotholus Tylocephale
†Platytholus; 1. †Platytholus clemensi	68-66 Ma	Hell Creek Formation, Montana, USA		Alaskacephale Goyocephale Pachycephalosaurus Prenocephale Sphaerotholus Tylocephale
†Prenocephale; 1. †Prenocephale prenes	80-75 Ma, Campanian to Maastrichtian	Nemegt Formation, Omnogovi Province, Mongolia		Alaskacephale Goyocephale Pachycephalosaurus Prenocephale Sphaerotholus Tylocephale
†Sphaerotholus; 1. †Sphaerotholus bucholtzae 2. †Sphaerotholus edmontonensis	73–66 Ma, Campanian to Maastrichtian	Hell Creek Formation, Montana, USA Horseshoe Canyon Formation, Alberta, Canada	This species had a widespread distribution and a characteristically dome-shaped skull.	Alaskacephale Goyocephale Pachycephalosaurus Prenocephale Sphaerotholus Tylocephale
†Tylocephale; 1. †Tylocephale gilmorei	80–70 Ma, Campanian to Maastrichtian	Barun Goyot Formation, Omnogovi Province, Mongolia	This species is estimated to have been about 1.4 m (4 ft 7 in) in length, with the tallest dome of any known pachycephalosaur.	Alaskacephale Goyocephale Pachycephalosaurus Prenocephale Sphaerotholus Tylocephale

=== †Sauropods ===
†Sauropods of the Maastrichtian
Taxa	Presence	Location	Description	Images
Aeolosaurus	72-66 Ma	Angostura Colorada Formation; Bajo Barreal Formation; Los Alamitos Formation; Allen Formation all in Argentina; Adamantina Formation; Marília Formation, both in Brazil	A 14-meter-long (46 ft) aeolosaurid titanosaur	Aeolosaurus Alamosaurus Ampelosaurus Bruhathkayosaurus Huabeisaurus Hypselosaurus Isisaurus Magyarosaurus Nemegtosaurus mongoliensis Opisthocoelicaudia Quaesitosaurus Rapetosaurus Saltasaurus
†Alamosaurus; †Alamosaurus sanjuanensis	70–66 Ma	Ojo Alamo Formation, New Mexico, USA North Horn Formation, Utah, USA: Black Peaks Formation, Texas, USA; El Picacho Formation, Texas, USA; Javelina Formation, Texas, USA	An opisthocoelicaudiine saltasaurid that was one of the largest dinosaur known from North America.	Aeolosaurus Alamosaurus Ampelosaurus Bruhathkayosaurus Huabeisaurus Hypselosaurus Isisaurus Magyarosaurus Nemegtosaurus mongoliensis Opisthocoelicaudia Quaesitosaurus Rapetosaurus Saltasaurus
†Ampelosaurus; †Ampelosaurus atacis	70–66 Ma	Marnes Rouges Inferieures Formation, France	Like most sauropods, this nemegtosaurid would have had a long neck and tail, but it also carried armor in the form of osteoderms 25–28 cm (9.8–11.0 in) long. The four osteoderms found have three different morphologies, they are plate, bulb, and spine-shaped. This dinosaur would have stretched up to about 15 m (49 ft) from snout to tail.	Aeolosaurus Alamosaurus Ampelosaurus Bruhathkayosaurus Huabeisaurus Hypselosaurus Isisaurus Magyarosaurus Nemegtosaurus mongoliensis Opisthocoelicaudia Quaesitosaurus Rapetosaurus Saltasaurus
†Argyrosaurus; †Argyrosaurus superbus	70 Ma	Lago Colhué Huapi Formation, Argentina		Aeolosaurus Alamosaurus Ampelosaurus Bruhathkayosaurus Huabeisaurus Hypselosaurus Isisaurus Magyarosaurus Nemegtosaurus mongoliensis Opisthocoelicaudia Quaesitosaurus Rapetosaurus Saltasaurus
†Arkharavia; †Arkharavia heterocoelica	66 Ma	Udurchukan Formation, Russia	A somphospondylan known from a few remains that were probably actually of a hadrosaur.	Aeolosaurus Alamosaurus Ampelosaurus Bruhathkayosaurus Huabeisaurus Hypselosaurus Isisaurus Magyarosaurus Nemegtosaurus mongoliensis Opisthocoelicaudia Quaesitosaurus Rapetosaurus Saltasaurus
†Bonatitan; †Bonatitan reigi	75-70 Ma, Santonian to Maastrichtian	Argentina	A saltasaurid known from a partial skeleton, including a braincase and caudal vertebrae. It may be a saltasaurine.	Aeolosaurus Alamosaurus Ampelosaurus Bruhathkayosaurus Huabeisaurus Hypselosaurus Isisaurus Magyarosaurus Nemegtosaurus mongoliensis Opisthocoelicaudia Quaesitosaurus Rapetosaurus Saltasaurus
†Campylodoniscus; †Campylodoniscus ameghinoi	95 or 70 Ma, Cenomanian or Maastrichtian	Argentina	A little-known titanosaur known from a single jawbone, the maxilla, holding seven teeth.	Aeolosaurus Alamosaurus Ampelosaurus Bruhathkayosaurus Huabeisaurus Hypselosaurus Isisaurus Magyarosaurus Nemegtosaurus mongoliensis Opisthocoelicaudia Quaesitosaurus Rapetosaurus Saltasaurus
†Dreadnoughtus; †Dreadnoughtus schrani	75 Ma, Santonian to Maastrichtian	Cerro Fortaleza Formation, Santa Cruz Province, Argentina	A giant titanosaur that is one of the largest of all known terrestrial vertebrates, possessing the greatest mass of any land animal that can be calculated with reasonable certainty, using limb bone measurements. It is known to be 26 m (85 ft) long in total body length and a 2-story-tall (6 m (20 ft)) shoulder height.	Aeolosaurus Alamosaurus Ampelosaurus Bruhathkayosaurus Huabeisaurus Hypselosaurus Isisaurus Magyarosaurus Nemegtosaurus mongoliensis Opisthocoelicaudia Quaesitosaurus Rapetosaurus Saltasaurus
†Gannansaurus; †Gannansaurus sinensis	66.7–66 Ma	Nanxiong Formation, Ganzhou Basin, Jiangxi Province, southern China	Likely more closely related to the basal somphospondylan, Euhelopus, than to titanosaurs, it might have been one of the latest surviving not-titanosaur sauropods.	Aeolosaurus Alamosaurus Ampelosaurus Bruhathkayosaurus Huabeisaurus Hypselosaurus Isisaurus Magyarosaurus Nemegtosaurus mongoliensis Opisthocoelicaudia Quaesitosaurus Rapetosaurus Saltasaurus
†Gondwanatitan; †Gondwanatitan faustoi	70 Ma	Adamantina Formation and Cambabe Formation, Brazil	An aeolosaurid titanosaur that had elongated centra in the vertebrae from the middle part of its tail. It had vertebral lateral fossae that resembled shallow depressions, similar to Saltasaurus, Alamosaurus, Malawisaurus and Aeolosaurus.	Aeolosaurus Alamosaurus Ampelosaurus Bruhathkayosaurus Huabeisaurus Hypselosaurus Isisaurus Magyarosaurus Nemegtosaurus mongoliensis Opisthocoelicaudia Quaesitosaurus Rapetosaurus Saltasaurus
†Huabeisaurus; †Huabeisaurus allocotus	95-72 Ma, Cenomanian to Maastrichtian	Huiquanpu Formation, Shanxi, China	A titanosaur that was mid-sized by sauropod standards, closely related to Tangvayosaurus.	Aeolosaurus Alamosaurus Ampelosaurus Bruhathkayosaurus Huabeisaurus Hypselosaurus Isisaurus Magyarosaurus Nemegtosaurus mongoliensis Opisthocoelicaudia Quaesitosaurus Rapetosaurus Saltasaurus
†Hypselosaurus; †Hypselosaurus priscus	70 Ma	Grès à Reptiles Formation, Provence-Alpes-Côte d'Azur, France	A titanosaurid with proportionally robust legs. The eggs are also unusually large; measuring at around 1 foot (0.30 m) in length.	Aeolosaurus Alamosaurus Ampelosaurus Bruhathkayosaurus Huabeisaurus Hypselosaurus Isisaurus Magyarosaurus Nemegtosaurus mongoliensis Opisthocoelicaudia Quaesitosaurus Rapetosaurus Saltasaurus
†Isisaurus; †Isisaurus colberti	70 Ma	Lameta Formation, Maharashtra, India	An antarctosaurid that had a "bizarre" appearance with a short, vertically directed neck and long forelimbs, making it considerably different from other sauropods.	Aeolosaurus Alamosaurus Ampelosaurus Bruhathkayosaurus Huabeisaurus Hypselosaurus Isisaurus Magyarosaurus Nemegtosaurus mongoliensis Opisthocoelicaudia Quaesitosaurus Rapetosaurus Saltasaurus
†Jainosaurus; †Jainosaurus septentrionalis	68 Ma	Lameta Formation, Madhya Pradesh, India	A large titanosaur that would have measured around eighteen meters long and held its head six meters high. No accurate estimate of the weight has yet been made. The humerus of the type specimen is 134 centimeters long.	Aeolosaurus Alamosaurus Ampelosaurus Bruhathkayosaurus Huabeisaurus Hypselosaurus Isisaurus Magyarosaurus Nemegtosaurus mongoliensis Opisthocoelicaudia Quaesitosaurus Rapetosaurus Saltasaurus
†Loricosaurus; †Loricosaurus scutatus	71 Ma	Allen Formation, Neuquén Province, Argentina	A saltasaurine saltasaurid that, due to the presence of armor, was first thought to be an ankylosaur.	Aeolosaurus Alamosaurus Ampelosaurus Bruhathkayosaurus Huabeisaurus Hypselosaurus Isisaurus Magyarosaurus Nemegtosaurus mongoliensis Opisthocoelicaudia Quaesitosaurus Rapetosaurus Saltasaurus
†Magyarosaurus; †Magyarosaurus dacus	71–66 Ma	Sanpetru Formation, Hunedoara County, Romania	A nemegtosaurid that is one of the smallest-known species of sauropod, measuring only six meters in length.	Aeolosaurus Alamosaurus Ampelosaurus Bruhathkayosaurus Huabeisaurus Hypselosaurus Isisaurus Magyarosaurus Nemegtosaurus mongoliensis Opisthocoelicaudia Quaesitosaurus Rapetosaurus Saltasaurus
†Nemegtosaurus; †Nemegtosaurus mongoliensis; †Nemegtosaurus pachi	70 Ma	Nemegt Formation, Omnogovi Province, Mongolia	A nemegtosaurid with a skull resembling that of a diplodocoid in being long and low, with pencil-shaped teeth.	Aeolosaurus Alamosaurus Ampelosaurus Bruhathkayosaurus Huabeisaurus Hypselosaurus Isisaurus Magyarosaurus Nemegtosaurus mongoliensis Opisthocoelicaudia Quaesitosaurus Rapetosaurus Saltasaurus
†Neuquensaurus; †Neuquensaurus australis; †Neuquensaurus robustus	80-66 Ma	Anacleto Formation, Neuquén Province, Argentina Uruguay	A saltasaurine saltasaurid that is a relatively small sauropod, with a femur only 0.75 m (2 ft 6 in) long. It is one of the most completely known of Patagonian sauropods.	Aeolosaurus Alamosaurus Ampelosaurus Bruhathkayosaurus Huabeisaurus Hypselosaurus Isisaurus Magyarosaurus Nemegtosaurus mongoliensis Opisthocoelicaudia Quaesitosaurus Rapetosaurus Saltasaurus
†Opisthocoelicaudia; †Opisthocoelocaudia skarzynskii	70 Ma	Nemegt Formation, Omnogovi Province, Mongolia	An opisthocoelicaudiine saltasaurid that was a relatively small sauropod, measuring over 11 m (36 ft) from the head to the tip of the tail. It is one of the best-known sauropods from the Late Cretaceous.	Aeolosaurus Alamosaurus Ampelosaurus Bruhathkayosaurus Huabeisaurus Hypselosaurus Isisaurus Magyarosaurus Nemegtosaurus mongoliensis Opisthocoelicaudia Quaesitosaurus Rapetosaurus Saltasaurus
†Paludititan; †Paludititan nalatzensis	70-66 Ma	Hunedoara County, Romania	A titanosaur known from a partial skeleton.	Aeolosaurus Alamosaurus Ampelosaurus Bruhathkayosaurus Huabeisaurus Hypselosaurus Isisaurus Magyarosaurus Nemegtosaurus mongoliensis Opisthocoelicaudia Quaesitosaurus Rapetosaurus Saltasaurus
†Quaesitosaurus; †Quaesitosaurus orientalis	85–70 Ma, Santonian to Maastrichtian	Barun Goyot Formation, Omnogovi Province, Mongolia	A little-known nemegtosaurid. Its fossils consist solely of a partial skull. Long, low and horse-like with frontally located peg-like teeth, it is similar enough to the skulls of Diplodocus and its kin to have prompted informed speculation that the missing body was formed like those of diplodocids. It is possible that Nemegtosaurus, also known from only skull material, is a very close relative of Quaesitosaurus, if not indeed a variation of the same animal.	Aeolosaurus Alamosaurus Ampelosaurus Bruhathkayosaurus Huabeisaurus Hypselosaurus Isisaurus Magyarosaurus Nemegtosaurus mongoliensis Opisthocoelicaudia Quaesitosaurus Rapetosaurus Saltasaurus
†Rapetosaurus; †Rapetosaurus krausei	70–66 Ma	Maevarano Formation, Mahajanga Province, Madagascar	A nemegtosaurid that was fairly modest in size, for a titanosaur, being less than half the length of Argentinosaurus and Paralititan.	Aeolosaurus Alamosaurus Ampelosaurus Bruhathkayosaurus Huabeisaurus Hypselosaurus Isisaurus Magyarosaurus Nemegtosaurus mongoliensis Opisthocoelicaudia Quaesitosaurus Rapetosaurus Saltasaurus
†Rocasaurus; †Rocasaurus muniozi	75–70	Allen Formation, Rio Negro Province, Argentina		Aeolosaurus Alamosaurus Ampelosaurus Bruhathkayosaurus Huabeisaurus Hypselosaurus Isisaurus Magyarosaurus Nemegtosaurus mongoliensis Opisthocoelicaudia Quaesitosaurus Rapetosaurus Saltasaurus
†Saltasaurus; †Saltasaurus loricatus	85-70 Ma	Lecho Formation, Salta Province, Argentina Uruguay	A well-known saltasaurine saltasaurid. Relatively small among typically sized sauropods, though still massive by the standards of modern terrestrial creatures, Saltasaurus is characterized by a diplodocid-like head (with blunt teeth, only in the front of the mouth). It was the first genus of sauropod known to possess armour of bony plates embedded in its skin. The small bony plates (osteoderms) have since been found on other titanosaurs. When the plates of a saltasaur were originally found, independently of skeletal remains, they were assumed to be from an ankylosaur, whose plates they resemble. A crest of scutes has also been discovered running down the back of diplodocid sauropods.	Aeolosaurus Alamosaurus Ampelosaurus Bruhathkayosaurus Huabeisaurus Hypselosaurus Isisaurus Magyarosaurus Nemegtosaurus mongoliensis Opisthocoelicaudia Quaesitosaurus Rapetosaurus Saltasaurus
†Titanosaurus; †Titanosaurus indicus; †Titanosaurus blandfordi	70 Ma	Lameta Formation, India	A dubious titanosaurid estimated to have grown up to 9–12 m (30–39 ft) long and about 13 tons in weight. Titanosaurus has traditionally been treated as a "wastebin taxon" for poorly preserved sauropod remains that demonstrate a distinctive vertebrae anatomy. The original Titanosaurus remains consist only of limb bones and a few vertebrae that have these characteristics. However, discoveries of more and better-preserved titanosaur species have shown that these once distinctive features are in fact widespread across many genera. Therefore, Titanosaurus itself is considered a nomen dubium by most paleontologists, since the original Titanosaurus specimens cannot be distinguished from those of related genera.	Aeolosaurus Alamosaurus Ampelosaurus Bruhathkayosaurus Huabeisaurus Hypselosaurus Isisaurus Magyarosaurus Nemegtosaurus mongoliensis Opisthocoelicaudia Quaesitosaurus Rapetosaurus Saltasaurus
†Uberabatitan; †Uberabatitan ribeiroi	67 Ma	Marilia Formation, Brazil	A little-known titanosaur known from specific bones including neck, back, and tail vertebrae, pelvic bones and limb bones.	Aeolosaurus Alamosaurus Ampelosaurus Bruhathkayosaurus Huabeisaurus Hypselosaurus Isisaurus Magyarosaurus Nemegtosaurus mongoliensis Opisthocoelicaudia Quaesitosaurus Rapetosaurus Saltasaurus
†Vahiny; †Vahiny depereti	70–66 Ma	Maevarano Formation, Mahajanga Province, Madagascar	A rare titanosaur coexisting with the more common Rapetosaurus. It is distinguished from other titanosaurs by characteristics of its braincase, including the basal tubera, basipterygoid processes, parasphenoid, and cranial nerve foramina. Differences in the braincases of Vahiny and Rapetosaurus indicate that they are not closely related to one another. Vahiny is most similar to Jainosaurus, and bears similarities to Muyelensaurus and Pitekunsaurus.	Aeolosaurus Alamosaurus Ampelosaurus Bruhathkayosaurus Huabeisaurus Hypselosaurus Isisaurus Magyarosaurus Nemegtosaurus mongoliensis Opisthocoelicaudia Quaesitosaurus Rapetosaurus Saltasaurus

=== †Theropods (non-maniraptoran) ===
†Non-avian theropods of the Maastrichtian
Taxa	Presence	Location	Description	Images
†Albertosaurus; 1. †Albertosaurus sarcophagus	71–68 Ma	Horseshoe Canyon Formation, Alberta, Canada	An albertosaurine tyrannosaurid	Albertosaurus Alioramus Archaeornithomimus Betasuchus Carnotaurus Chenanisaurus Deinocheirus Dryptosaurus Gallimimus Indosuchus Joan Wiffen's Theropod Majungasaurus Nanuqsaurus Ornithomimus Qianzhousaurus Qiupalong Quilmesaurus Rahiolisaurus Rajasaurus Raptorex Struthiomimus altus Tarbosaurus Tyrannosaurus
†Alioramus; 1. †Alioramus remotus	70 Ma	Nemegt Formation, Omnogovi Province, Mongolia	A tyrannosauroid	Albertosaurus Alioramus Archaeornithomimus Betasuchus Carnotaurus Chenanisaurus Deinocheirus Dryptosaurus Gallimimus Indosuchus Joan Wiffen's Theropod Majungasaurus Nanuqsaurus Ornithomimus Qianzhousaurus Qiupalong Quilmesaurus Rahiolisaurus Rajasaurus Raptorex Struthiomimus altus Tarbosaurus Tyrannosaurus
†Anserimimus; 1. †Anserimimus planinychus	70 Ma	Nemegt Formation, Omnogovi Province, Mongolia	An ornithomimid with more powerful forelimbs than other orinithomimids.	Albertosaurus Alioramus Archaeornithomimus Betasuchus Carnotaurus Chenanisaurus Deinocheirus Dryptosaurus Gallimimus Indosuchus Joan Wiffen's Theropod Majungasaurus Nanuqsaurus Ornithomimus Qianzhousaurus Qiupalong Quilmesaurus Rahiolisaurus Rajasaurus Raptorex Struthiomimus altus Tarbosaurus Tyrannosaurus
†Archaeornithomimus; 1. †Archaeornithomimus asiaticus	70 Ma	Iren Dabasu Formation, Inner Mongolia, China	An ornithomimid, originally thought to have lived from the Cenomanian to the Turonian.	Albertosaurus Alioramus Archaeornithomimus Betasuchus Carnotaurus Chenanisaurus Deinocheirus Dryptosaurus Gallimimus Indosuchus Joan Wiffen's Theropod Majungasaurus Nanuqsaurus Ornithomimus Qianzhousaurus Qiupalong Quilmesaurus Rahiolisaurus Rajasaurus Raptorex Struthiomimus altus Tarbosaurus Tyrannosaurus
†Betasuchus; 1. †Betasuchus bredai	66 Ma	Maastricht Formation, Limburg, Netherlands	One of the few abelisaurs to be found in the Northern Hemisphere.	Albertosaurus Alioramus Archaeornithomimus Betasuchus Carnotaurus Chenanisaurus Deinocheirus Dryptosaurus Gallimimus Indosuchus Joan Wiffen's Theropod Majungasaurus Nanuqsaurus Ornithomimus Qianzhousaurus Qiupalong Quilmesaurus Rahiolisaurus Rajasaurus Raptorex Struthiomimus altus Tarbosaurus Tyrannosaurus
†Carnotaurus; 1. †Carnotaurus sastrei	72–66 Ma	La Colonia Formation, Chubut Province, Argentina	A highly derived carnotaurine abelisaurid	Albertosaurus Alioramus Archaeornithomimus Betasuchus Carnotaurus Chenanisaurus Deinocheirus Dryptosaurus Gallimimus Indosuchus Joan Wiffen's Theropod Majungasaurus Nanuqsaurus Ornithomimus Qianzhousaurus Qiupalong Quilmesaurus Rahiolisaurus Rajasaurus Raptorex Struthiomimus altus Tarbosaurus Tyrannosaurus
†"Coelosaurus" antiquus	70-66 Ma	Navesink Formation, New Jersey	In 1979, Baird and Horner discovered that the name "Coelosaurus" was preoccupied by another dubious taxon (based on a single vertebra), named Coelosaurus by an anonymous author now known to be Richard Owen in 1854.	Albertosaurus Alioramus Archaeornithomimus Betasuchus Carnotaurus Chenanisaurus Deinocheirus Dryptosaurus Gallimimus Indosuchus Joan Wiffen's Theropod Majungasaurus Nanuqsaurus Ornithomimus Qianzhousaurus Qiupalong Quilmesaurus Rahiolisaurus Rajasaurus Raptorex Struthiomimus altus Tarbosaurus Tyrannosaurus
†Coeluroides; 1. †Coeluroides	66 Ma	Lameta Formation, India	A small, little-known theropod.	Albertosaurus Alioramus Archaeornithomimus Betasuchus Carnotaurus Chenanisaurus Deinocheirus Dryptosaurus Gallimimus Indosuchus Joan Wiffen's Theropod Majungasaurus Nanuqsaurus Ornithomimus Qianzhousaurus Qiupalong Quilmesaurus Rahiolisaurus Rajasaurus Raptorex Struthiomimus altus Tarbosaurus Tyrannosaurus
†Compsosuchus; 1. †Compsosuchus solus	69 Ma	Lameta Formation, India	A poorly-known theropod	Albertosaurus Alioramus Archaeornithomimus Betasuchus Carnotaurus Chenanisaurus Deinocheirus Dryptosaurus Gallimimus Indosuchus Joan Wiffen's Theropod Majungasaurus Nanuqsaurus Ornithomimus Qianzhousaurus Qiupalong Quilmesaurus Rahiolisaurus Rajasaurus Raptorex Struthiomimus altus Tarbosaurus Tyrannosaurus
Chenanisaurus; 1. Chenanisaurus	68-66 Ma	Ouled Abdoun Basin in Morocco, Africa	A species of predatory abelisaurid theropod.	Albertosaurus Alioramus Archaeornithomimus Betasuchus Carnotaurus Chenanisaurus Deinocheirus Dryptosaurus Gallimimus Indosuchus Joan Wiffen's Theropod Majungasaurus Nanuqsaurus Ornithomimus Qianzhousaurus Qiupalong Quilmesaurus Rahiolisaurus Rajasaurus Raptorex Struthiomimus altus Tarbosaurus Tyrannosaurus
†Deinocheirus; 1. †Deinocheirus mirificus	71–69 Ma	Nemegt Formation, Omnogovi Province, Mongolia	A very large and distinctive ornithomimosaur	Albertosaurus Alioramus Archaeornithomimus Betasuchus Carnotaurus Chenanisaurus Deinocheirus Dryptosaurus Gallimimus Indosuchus Joan Wiffen's Theropod Majungasaurus Nanuqsaurus Ornithomimus Qianzhousaurus Qiupalong Quilmesaurus Rahiolisaurus Rajasaurus Raptorex Struthiomimus altus Tarbosaurus Tyrannosaurus
†Diplotomodon; 1. †Diplotomodon horrificus	70-66 Ma	Navesink Formation, New Jersey, USA	A dubious tyrannosauroid, possibly a synonym of Dryptosaurus.	Albertosaurus Alioramus Archaeornithomimus Betasuchus Carnotaurus Chenanisaurus Deinocheirus Dryptosaurus Gallimimus Indosuchus Joan Wiffen's Theropod Majungasaurus Nanuqsaurus Ornithomimus Qianzhousaurus Qiupalong Quilmesaurus Rahiolisaurus Rajasaurus Raptorex Struthiomimus altus Tarbosaurus Tyrannosaurus
†Dryptosauroides; 1. †Dryptosauroides grandis	66 Ma	Lameta Formation, India	A dubious abelisaurid.	Albertosaurus Alioramus Archaeornithomimus Betasuchus Carnotaurus Chenanisaurus Deinocheirus Dryptosaurus Gallimimus Indosuchus Joan Wiffen's Theropod Majungasaurus Nanuqsaurus Ornithomimus Qianzhousaurus Qiupalong Quilmesaurus Rahiolisaurus Rajasaurus Raptorex Struthiomimus altus Tarbosaurus Tyrannosaurus
†Dryptosaurus; 1. †Dryptosaurus aquilunguis	67-66 Ma	New Jersey, USA	A primitive tyrannosaur and among the first theropod dinosaurs known to science.	Albertosaurus Alioramus Archaeornithomimus Betasuchus Carnotaurus Chenanisaurus Deinocheirus Dryptosaurus Gallimimus Indosuchus Joan Wiffen's Theropod Majungasaurus Nanuqsaurus Ornithomimus Qianzhousaurus Qiupalong Quilmesaurus Rahiolisaurus Rajasaurus Raptorex Struthiomimus altus Tarbosaurus Tyrannosaurus
†Gallimimus; 1. †Gallimimus bullatus	70 Ma	Nemegt Formation, Omnogovi Province, Mongolia	An ornithomimid that was one of the largest ornithomimosaurs.	Albertosaurus Alioramus Archaeornithomimus Betasuchus Carnotaurus Chenanisaurus Deinocheirus Dryptosaurus Gallimimus Indosuchus Joan Wiffen's Theropod Majungasaurus Nanuqsaurus Ornithomimus Qianzhousaurus Qiupalong Quilmesaurus Rahiolisaurus Rajasaurus Raptorex Struthiomimus altus Tarbosaurus Tyrannosaurus
†Indosaurus; 1. †Indosaurus matleyi	69 Ma	Lameta Formation, India	A majungasaurine abelisaurid.	Albertosaurus Alioramus Archaeornithomimus Betasuchus Carnotaurus Chenanisaurus Deinocheirus Dryptosaurus Gallimimus Indosuchus Joan Wiffen's Theropod Majungasaurus Nanuqsaurus Ornithomimus Qianzhousaurus Qiupalong Quilmesaurus Rahiolisaurus Rajasaurus Raptorex Struthiomimus altus Tarbosaurus Tyrannosaurus
†Indosuchus; 1. †Indosuchus raptorius	70–66 Ma	Lameta Formation, Madhya Pradesh, India	A carnotaurine abelisaurid, very similar to Indosaurus.	Albertosaurus Alioramus Archaeornithomimus Betasuchus Carnotaurus Chenanisaurus Deinocheirus Dryptosaurus Gallimimus Indosuchus Joan Wiffen's Theropod Majungasaurus Nanuqsaurus Ornithomimus Qianzhousaurus Qiupalong Quilmesaurus Rahiolisaurus Rajasaurus Raptorex Struthiomimus altus Tarbosaurus Tyrannosaurus
†"Joan Wiffen's Theropod"		Hawke's Bay Region, North Island, New Zealand	A little-known theropod with no official scientific name as of yet.	Albertosaurus Alioramus Archaeornithomimus Betasuchus Carnotaurus Chenanisaurus Deinocheirus Dryptosaurus Gallimimus Indosuchus Joan Wiffen's Theropod Majungasaurus Nanuqsaurus Ornithomimus Qianzhousaurus Qiupalong Quilmesaurus Rahiolisaurus Rajasaurus Raptorex Struthiomimus altus Tarbosaurus Tyrannosaurus
†Jubbulpuria; 1. †Jubbulpuria tenuis	70 Ma	Lameta Formation, Madhya Pradesh, India	A poorly-known theropod that may have been a ceratosaur.	Albertosaurus Alioramus Archaeornithomimus Betasuchus Carnotaurus Chenanisaurus Deinocheirus Dryptosaurus Gallimimus Indosuchus Joan Wiffen's Theropod Majungasaurus Nanuqsaurus Ornithomimus Qianzhousaurus Qiupalong Quilmesaurus Rahiolisaurus Rajasaurus Raptorex Struthiomimus altus Tarbosaurus Tyrannosaurus
†Laevisuchus; 1. †Laevisuchus indicus	70 Ma	Lameta Formation, Madhya Pradesh, India	Originally thought to be a coelurid coelurosaur, now considered a noasaurid abelisaur.	Albertosaurus Alioramus Archaeornithomimus Betasuchus Carnotaurus Chenanisaurus Deinocheirus Dryptosaurus Gallimimus Indosuchus Joan Wiffen's Theropod Majungasaurus Nanuqsaurus Ornithomimus Qianzhousaurus Qiupalong Quilmesaurus Rahiolisaurus Rajasaurus Raptorex Struthiomimus altus Tarbosaurus Tyrannosaurus
†Lametasaurus; 1. †Lametasaurus indicus	70 Ma	Lameta Formation, Madhya Pradesh, India	A possibly dubious carnotaurine abelisaurid, originally considered a possible chimera.	Albertosaurus Alioramus Archaeornithomimus Betasuchus Carnotaurus Chenanisaurus Deinocheirus Dryptosaurus Gallimimus Indosuchus Joan Wiffen's Theropod Majungasaurus Nanuqsaurus Ornithomimus Qianzhousaurus Qiupalong Quilmesaurus Rahiolisaurus Rajasaurus Raptorex Struthiomimus altus Tarbosaurus Tyrannosaurus
†Maip; 1. †Maip Macrothorax	66 Ma	Chorrillo Formation, Santa Cruz, Argentina	The largest megaraptorid.	Albertosaurus Alioramus Archaeornithomimus Betasuchus Carnotaurus Chenanisaurus Deinocheirus Dryptosaurus Gallimimus Indosuchus Joan Wiffen's Theropod Majungasaurus Nanuqsaurus Ornithomimus Qianzhousaurus Qiupalong Quilmesaurus Rahiolisaurus Rajasaurus Raptorex Struthiomimus altus Tarbosaurus Tyrannosaurus
†Majungasaurus; 1. †Majungasaurus crenatissimus	70–66 Ma	Maevarano Formation, Mahajanga Province, Madagascar	A majungasaurine abelisaurid.	Albertosaurus Alioramus Archaeornithomimus Betasuchus Carnotaurus Chenanisaurus Deinocheirus Dryptosaurus Gallimimus Indosuchus Joan Wiffen's Theropod Majungasaurus Nanuqsaurus Ornithomimus Qianzhousaurus Qiupalong Quilmesaurus Rahiolisaurus Rajasaurus Raptorex Struthiomimus altus Tarbosaurus Tyrannosaurus
†Masiakasaurus; 1. †Masiakasaurus knopfleri	70 Ma	Maevarano Formation, Mahajanga Province, Madagascar	A noasaurid ceratosaur.	Albertosaurus Alioramus Archaeornithomimus Betasuchus Carnotaurus Chenanisaurus Deinocheirus Dryptosaurus Gallimimus Indosuchus Joan Wiffen's Theropod Majungasaurus Nanuqsaurus Ornithomimus Qianzhousaurus Qiupalong Quilmesaurus Rahiolisaurus Rajasaurus Raptorex Struthiomimus altus Tarbosaurus Tyrannosaurus
†Nanuqsaurus; 1. †Nanuqsaurus hoglundi	69.1 Ma	Prince Creek Formation, Alaska, USA	A small tyrannosaurid	Albertosaurus Alioramus Archaeornithomimus Betasuchus Carnotaurus Chenanisaurus Deinocheirus Dryptosaurus Gallimimus Indosuchus Joan Wiffen's Theropod Majungasaurus Nanuqsaurus Ornithomimus Qianzhousaurus Qiupalong Quilmesaurus Rahiolisaurus Rajasaurus Raptorex Struthiomimus altus Tarbosaurus Tyrannosaurus
†Noasaurus; 1. †Noasaurus leali	70 Ma	Lecho Formation, Salta Province, Argentina	A noasaurid originally thought to be a dromaeosaur.	Albertosaurus Alioramus Archaeornithomimus Betasuchus Carnotaurus Chenanisaurus Deinocheirus Dryptosaurus Gallimimus Indosuchus Joan Wiffen's Theropod Majungasaurus Nanuqsaurus Ornithomimus Qianzhousaurus Qiupalong Quilmesaurus Rahiolisaurus Rajasaurus Raptorex Struthiomimus altus Tarbosaurus Tyrannosaurus
†Ornithomimoides; 1. †Ornithomimoides barasimlensis 2. †Ornithomimoides mobilis	70–66 Ma	India	A dubious theropod that was probably a small variety of abelisaur.	Albertosaurus Alioramus Archaeornithomimus Betasuchus Carnotaurus Chenanisaurus Deinocheirus Dryptosaurus Gallimimus Indosuchus Joan Wiffen's Theropod Majungasaurus Nanuqsaurus Ornithomimus Qianzhousaurus Qiupalong Quilmesaurus Rahiolisaurus Rajasaurus Raptorex Struthiomimus altus Tarbosaurus Tyrannosaurus
†Ornithomimus; 1. †Ornithomimus edmontonicus 2. †Ornithomimus velox	75.5–66, Campanian to Maastrichtian	Denver Formation, Colorado, USA Horseshoe Canyon Formation, Alberta, Canada: Hell Creek Formation, Montana, USA	A well-known ornithomimid.	Albertosaurus Alioramus Archaeornithomimus Betasuchus Carnotaurus Chenanisaurus Deinocheirus Dryptosaurus Gallimimus Indosuchus Joan Wiffen's Theropod Majungasaurus Nanuqsaurus Ornithomimus Qianzhousaurus Qiupalong Quilmesaurus Rahiolisaurus Rajasaurus Raptorex Struthiomimus altus Tarbosaurus Tyrannosaurus
†Orthogoniosaurus; 1. †Orthogoniosaurus matleyi	66 Ma	Lameta Formation, Madhya Pradesh, India	A poorly-known theropod, possibly an abelisaur.	Albertosaurus Alioramus Archaeornithomimus Betasuchus Carnotaurus Chenanisaurus Deinocheirus Dryptosaurus Gallimimus Indosuchus Joan Wiffen's Theropod Majungasaurus Nanuqsaurus Ornithomimus Qianzhousaurus Qiupalong Quilmesaurus Rahiolisaurus Rajasaurus Raptorex Struthiomimus altus Tarbosaurus Tyrannosaurus
Pycnonemosaurus; 1. Pycnonemosaurus nevesi	70 Ma	Mato Grosso, Brazil	A carnotaurine abelisaurid known so far from fragmentary remains.	Albertosaurus Alioramus Archaeornithomimus Betasuchus Carnotaurus Chenanisaurus Deinocheirus Dryptosaurus Gallimimus Indosuchus Joan Wiffen's Theropod Majungasaurus Nanuqsaurus Ornithomimus Qianzhousaurus Qiupalong Quilmesaurus Rahiolisaurus Rajasaurus Raptorex Struthiomimus altus Tarbosaurus Tyrannosaurus
†Qianzhousaurus; 1. †Qianzhousaurus sinensis	72–66 Ma	Nanxiong Formation, Guangdong, China	A tyrannosaurid nicknamed "Pinocchio rex" for its long snout in comparison to other known tyrannosaurs. A close relative of Alioramus.	Albertosaurus Alioramus Archaeornithomimus Betasuchus Carnotaurus Chenanisaurus Deinocheirus Dryptosaurus Gallimimus Indosuchus Joan Wiffen's Theropod Majungasaurus Nanuqsaurus Ornithomimus Qianzhousaurus Qiupalong Quilmesaurus Rahiolisaurus Rajasaurus Raptorex Struthiomimus altus Tarbosaurus Tyrannosaurus
†Qiupalong; 1. †Qiupalong henanensis	99.7–66 Ma, Cenomanian to Maastrichtian	Qiupa Formation, Henan, China	An Ornithomimid	Albertosaurus Alioramus Archaeornithomimus Betasuchus Carnotaurus Chenanisaurus Deinocheirus Dryptosaurus Gallimimus Indosuchus Joan Wiffen's Theropod Majungasaurus Nanuqsaurus Ornithomimus Qianzhousaurus Qiupalong Quilmesaurus Rahiolisaurus Rajasaurus Raptorex Struthiomimus altus Tarbosaurus Tyrannosaurus
†Quilmesaurus; 1. †Quilmesaurus curriei	Campanian to Maastrichtian	Allen Formation, Neuquén Province, Argentina	A carnotaurine abelisaurid.	Albertosaurus Alioramus Archaeornithomimus Betasuchus Carnotaurus Chenanisaurus Deinocheirus Dryptosaurus Gallimimus Indosuchus Joan Wiffen's Theropod Majungasaurus Nanuqsaurus Ornithomimus Qianzhousaurus Qiupalong Quilmesaurus Rahiolisaurus Rajasaurus Raptorex Struthiomimus altus Tarbosaurus Tyrannosaurus
†Rahiolisaurus; 1. †Rahiolisaurus gujaratensis	72.1–66 Ma	Lameta Formation, Gujarat, India	A large-sized majungasaurine abelisaurid similar to the closely related Rajasaurus.	Albertosaurus Alioramus Archaeornithomimus Betasuchus Carnotaurus Chenanisaurus Deinocheirus Dryptosaurus Gallimimus Indosuchus Joan Wiffen's Theropod Majungasaurus Nanuqsaurus Ornithomimus Qianzhousaurus Qiupalong Quilmesaurus Rahiolisaurus Rajasaurus Raptorex Struthiomimus altus Tarbosaurus Tyrannosaurus
†Rajasaurus; 1. †Rajasaurus narmadensis	69 Ma	Lameta Formation, Gujarat, India	A majungasaurine abelisaurid	Albertosaurus Alioramus Archaeornithomimus Betasuchus Carnotaurus Chenanisaurus Deinocheirus Dryptosaurus Gallimimus Indosuchus Joan Wiffen's Theropod Majungasaurus Nanuqsaurus Ornithomimus Qianzhousaurus Qiupalong Quilmesaurus Rahiolisaurus Rajasaurus Raptorex Struthiomimus altus Tarbosaurus Tyrannosaurus
†Raptorex; 1. †Raptorex kriegsteini	70 Ma	Nemegt Formation, Omnogovi Province, Mongolia	A dubious tyrannosaurid known from only juvenile remains, possibly synonymous with Tarbosaurus.	Albertosaurus Alioramus Archaeornithomimus Betasuchus Carnotaurus Chenanisaurus Deinocheirus Dryptosaurus Gallimimus Indosuchus Joan Wiffen's Theropod Majungasaurus Nanuqsaurus Ornithomimus Qianzhousaurus Qiupalong Quilmesaurus Rahiolisaurus Rajasaurus Raptorex Struthiomimus altus Tarbosaurus Tyrannosaurus
†Richardoestesia; 1. †Richardoestesia isosceles	76.5–66 Ma, Campanian to Maastrichtian	Aguja Formation, Texas, USA	A little-known coelurosaur known from a few jaws and teeth.	Albertosaurus Alioramus Archaeornithomimus Betasuchus Carnotaurus Chenanisaurus Deinocheirus Dryptosaurus Gallimimus Indosuchus Joan Wiffen's Theropod Majungasaurus Nanuqsaurus Ornithomimus Qianzhousaurus Qiupalong Quilmesaurus Rahiolisaurus Rajasaurus Raptorex Struthiomimus altus Tarbosaurus Tyrannosaurus
†Struthiomimus; 1. †Struthiomimus altus 2. †Struthiomimus sedens	75–66 Ma, Campanian to Maastrichtian	Lance Formation, Wyoming, USA Hell Creek Formation, Montana, USA: Horseshoe Canyon Formation, Alberta, Canada	An ornithomimid	Albertosaurus Alioramus Archaeornithomimus Betasuchus Carnotaurus Chenanisaurus Deinocheirus Dryptosaurus Gallimimus Indosuchus Joan Wiffen's Theropod Majungasaurus Nanuqsaurus Ornithomimus Qianzhousaurus Qiupalong Quilmesaurus Rahiolisaurus Rajasaurus Raptorex Struthiomimus altus Tarbosaurus Tyrannosaurus
†Tarbosaurus; 1. †Tarbosaurus bataar	70-66 Ma	Nemegt Formation, Omnogovi Province, Mongolia	A tyrannosaurine tyrannosaurid, sometimes considered an Asian species of Tyrannosaurus.	Albertosaurus Alioramus Archaeornithomimus Betasuchus Carnotaurus Chenanisaurus Deinocheirus Dryptosaurus Gallimimus Indosuchus Joan Wiffen's Theropod Majungasaurus Nanuqsaurus Ornithomimus Qianzhousaurus Qiupalong Quilmesaurus Rahiolisaurus Rajasaurus Raptorex Struthiomimus altus Tarbosaurus Tyrannosaurus
†Tyrannosaurus; 1. †Tyrannosaurus rex	68–66 Ma	*Hell Creek Formation, Montana & South Dakota, USA: North Horn Formation, Utah, USA; Frenchman Formation, Alberta & Saskatchewan, Canada; Lance Formation, Wyoming, USA	Probably the most iconic dinosaur, Tyrannosaurus is a tyrannosaurine tyrannosaurid. The largest-known Tyrannosaruoid and among the last large non-avian dinosaurs. It is also one of the largest theropod dinosaurs to have ever lived, and one of the largest carnivores to have ever roamed North America	Albertosaurus Alioramus Archaeornithomimus Betasuchus Carnotaurus Chenanisaurus Deinocheirus Dryptosaurus Gallimimus Indosuchus Joan Wiffen's Theropod Majungasaurus Nanuqsaurus Ornithomimus Qianzhousaurus Qiupalong Quilmesaurus Rahiolisaurus Rajasaurus Raptorex Struthiomimus altus Tarbosaurus Tyrannosaurus
1. †Vitakridrinda sulaimani	69 Ma	Pab Formation, Pakistan	An abelisaurid known from partial remains.	Albertosaurus Alioramus Archaeornithomimus Betasuchus Carnotaurus Chenanisaurus Deinocheirus Dryptosaurus Gallimimus Indosuchus Joan Wiffen's Theropod Majungasaurus Nanuqsaurus Ornithomimus Qianzhousaurus Qiupalong Quilmesaurus Rahiolisaurus Rajasaurus Raptorex Struthiomimus altus Tarbosaurus Tyrannosaurus
†Vitakrisaurus; 1. †Vitakrisaurus saraiki	70 Ma	Vitaki Formation, Pakistan	A rare noasaurid.	Albertosaurus Alioramus Archaeornithomimus Betasuchus Carnotaurus Chenanisaurus Deinocheirus Dryptosaurus Gallimimus Indosuchus Joan Wiffen's Theropod Majungasaurus Nanuqsaurus Ornithomimus Qianzhousaurus Qiupalong Quilmesaurus Rahiolisaurus Rajasaurus Raptorex Struthiomimus altus Tarbosaurus Tyrannosaurus

==== †Maniraptora (non-avian) ====
†Non-avian theropods of the Maastrichtian
Taxa	Presence	Location	Description	Images
†Acheroraptor; 1. †Acheroraptor temertyorum	66 Ma	Hell Creek Formation, Montana, USA	The youngest-known velociraptorine dromaeosaur.	Acheroraptor Adasaurus Albertonykus Anzu Atrociraptor Austroraptor Avimimus Ceratonykus Dakotaraptor Elmisaurus Erliansaurus Ganzhousaurus Heyuannia Jiangxisaurus Luanchuanraptor Mononykus Nankangia Nanshiungosaurus Neimongosaurus Nemegtomaia Nomingia Pyroraptor Rahonavis Rinchenia Saurornitholestes Struthiomimus altus Therizinosaurus Troodon Velociraptor Zanabazar
†Adasaurus; 1. †Adasaurus mongoliensis	70 Ma	Nemegt Formation, Omnogovi Province, Mongolia	A dromaeosaur unique in having relatively small sickle claws on its hind feet.	Acheroraptor Adasaurus Albertonykus Anzu Atrociraptor Austroraptor Avimimus Ceratonykus Dakotaraptor Elmisaurus Erliansaurus Ganzhousaurus Heyuannia Jiangxisaurus Luanchuanraptor Mononykus Nankangia Nanshiungosaurus Neimongosaurus Nemegtomaia Nomingia Pyroraptor Rahonavis Rinchenia Saurornitholestes Struthiomimus altus Therizinosaurus Troodon Velociraptor Zanabazar
†Ajancingenia; 1. †Ajancingenia yanshini	70 Ma	Barun Goyot Formation, Omnogovi Province, Mongolia	An oviraptorid. Originally called Ingenia, a name already preoccupied by a nematode.	Acheroraptor Adasaurus Albertonykus Anzu Atrociraptor Austroraptor Avimimus Ceratonykus Dakotaraptor Elmisaurus Erliansaurus Ganzhousaurus Heyuannia Jiangxisaurus Luanchuanraptor Mononykus Nankangia Nanshiungosaurus Neimongosaurus Nemegtomaia Nomingia Pyroraptor Rahonavis Rinchenia Saurornitholestes Struthiomimus altus Therizinosaurus Troodon Velociraptor Zanabazar
†Albertonykus; 1. †Albertonykus borealis	68.5 Ma	Horseshoe Canyon Formation, Alberta, Canada	A parvicursorine and the earliest-known North American alvarezsaurid.	Acheroraptor Adasaurus Albertonykus Anzu Atrociraptor Austroraptor Avimimus Ceratonykus Dakotaraptor Elmisaurus Erliansaurus Ganzhousaurus Heyuannia Jiangxisaurus Luanchuanraptor Mononykus Nankangia Nanshiungosaurus Neimongosaurus Nemegtomaia Nomingia Pyroraptor Rahonavis Rinchenia Saurornitholestes Struthiomimus altus Therizinosaurus Troodon Velociraptor Zanabazar
†Anzu; 1. †Anzu wyliei	66 Ma	Hell Creek Formation, Montana & South Dakota, USA	A caenagnathine caenagnathid, originally thought to be a species of Chirostenotes. Anzu measured about 3 to 3.5 meters (9.8 to 11.5 ft) long, up to 1.5 m (4 ft 11 in) tall at the hips and 200 to 300 kg (440 to 660 lb) in weight.	Acheroraptor Adasaurus Albertonykus Anzu Atrociraptor Austroraptor Avimimus Ceratonykus Dakotaraptor Elmisaurus Erliansaurus Ganzhousaurus Heyuannia Jiangxisaurus Luanchuanraptor Mononykus Nankangia Nanshiungosaurus Neimongosaurus Nemegtomaia Nomingia Pyroraptor Rahonavis Rinchenia Saurornitholestes Struthiomimus altus Therizinosaurus Troodon Velociraptor Zanabazar
†Atrociraptor; 1. †Atrociraptor marshalli	68.5 Ma	Horseshoe Canyon Formation, Alberta, Canada	A dromaeosaur	Acheroraptor Adasaurus Albertonykus Anzu Atrociraptor Austroraptor Avimimus Ceratonykus Dakotaraptor Elmisaurus Erliansaurus Ganzhousaurus Heyuannia Jiangxisaurus Luanchuanraptor Mononykus Nankangia Nanshiungosaurus Neimongosaurus Nemegtomaia Nomingia Pyroraptor Rahonavis Rinchenia Saurornitholestes Struthiomimus altus Therizinosaurus Troodon Velociraptor Zanabazar
†Austroraptor; 1. †Austroraptor cabazai	70 Ma	Allen Formation, Rio Negro Province, Argentina	An unenlagiine and the largest dromaeosaur from the Southern Hemisphere.	Acheroraptor Adasaurus Albertonykus Anzu Atrociraptor Austroraptor Avimimus Ceratonykus Dakotaraptor Elmisaurus Erliansaurus Ganzhousaurus Heyuannia Jiangxisaurus Luanchuanraptor Mononykus Nankangia Nanshiungosaurus Neimongosaurus Nemegtomaia Nomingia Pyroraptor Rahonavis Rinchenia Saurornitholestes Struthiomimus altus Therizinosaurus Troodon Velociraptor Zanabazar
†Avimimus; 1. †Avimimus portentosus	70 Ma	Nemegt Formation, Omnogovi Province, Mongolia	A caenagnathoid oviraptorosaur	Acheroraptor Adasaurus Albertonykus Anzu Atrociraptor Austroraptor Avimimus Ceratonykus Dakotaraptor Elmisaurus Erliansaurus Ganzhousaurus Heyuannia Jiangxisaurus Luanchuanraptor Mononykus Nankangia Nanshiungosaurus Neimongosaurus Nemegtomaia Nomingia Pyroraptor Rahonavis Rinchenia Saurornitholestes Struthiomimus altus Therizinosaurus Troodon Velociraptor Zanabazar
†Banji; 1. †Banji long	66 Ma	Nanxiong Formation, Jiangxi, China	An oviraptorine oviraptorid	Acheroraptor Adasaurus Albertonykus Anzu Atrociraptor Austroraptor Avimimus Ceratonykus Dakotaraptor Elmisaurus Erliansaurus Ganzhousaurus Heyuannia Jiangxisaurus Luanchuanraptor Mononykus Nankangia Nanshiungosaurus Neimongosaurus Nemegtomaia Nomingia Pyroraptor Rahonavis Rinchenia Saurornitholestes Struthiomimus altus Therizinosaurus Troodon Velociraptor Zanabazar
†Bonapartenykus; 1. †Bonapartenykus ultimus	70 Ma	Argentina	A patagonykine alvarezsaurid	Acheroraptor Adasaurus Albertonykus Anzu Atrociraptor Austroraptor Avimimus Ceratonykus Dakotaraptor Elmisaurus Erliansaurus Ganzhousaurus Heyuannia Jiangxisaurus Luanchuanraptor Mononykus Nankangia Nanshiungosaurus Neimongosaurus Nemegtomaia Nomingia Pyroraptor Rahonavis Rinchenia Saurornitholestes Struthiomimus altus Therizinosaurus Troodon Velociraptor Zanabazar
†Borogovia; 1. †Borogovia gracilicrus	70 Ma	Nemegt Formation, Omnogovi Province, Mongolia	A troodontid	Acheroraptor Adasaurus Albertonykus Anzu Atrociraptor Austroraptor Avimimus Ceratonykus Dakotaraptor Elmisaurus Erliansaurus Ganzhousaurus Heyuannia Jiangxisaurus Luanchuanraptor Mononykus Nankangia Nanshiungosaurus Neimongosaurus Nemegtomaia Nomingia Pyroraptor Rahonavis Rinchenia Saurornitholestes Struthiomimus altus Therizinosaurus Troodon Velociraptor Zanabazar
†Bradycneme; 1. †Bradycneme draculae	70 Ma	Sanpetru Formation, Hunedoara County, Romania	An alvarezsaurid, formerly believed to be a giant owl	Acheroraptor Adasaurus Albertonykus Anzu Atrociraptor Austroraptor Avimimus Ceratonykus Dakotaraptor Elmisaurus Erliansaurus Ganzhousaurus Heyuannia Jiangxisaurus Luanchuanraptor Mononykus Nankangia Nanshiungosaurus Neimongosaurus Nemegtomaia Nomingia Pyroraptor Rahonavis Rinchenia Saurornitholestes Struthiomimus altus Therizinosaurus Troodon Velociraptor Zanabazar
†Ceratonykus; 1. †Ceratonykus oculatus	84–70 Ma, Santonian to Maastrichtian	Barun Goyot Formation, Omnogovi Province, Mongolia	A parvicursorine alvarezsaurid.	Acheroraptor Adasaurus Albertonykus Anzu Atrociraptor Austroraptor Avimimus Ceratonykus Dakotaraptor Elmisaurus Erliansaurus Ganzhousaurus Heyuannia Jiangxisaurus Luanchuanraptor Mononykus Nankangia Nanshiungosaurus Neimongosaurus Nemegtomaia Nomingia Pyroraptor Rahonavis Rinchenia Saurornitholestes Struthiomimus altus Therizinosaurus Troodon Velociraptor Zanabazar
Conchoraptor; 1. Conchoraptor gracilis	70-66 Ma	Red Beds of Hermiin Tsav, Nemegt Formation, Mongolia	A heyuannin oviraptorid.	Acheroraptor Adasaurus Albertonykus Anzu Atrociraptor Austroraptor Avimimus Ceratonykus Dakotaraptor Elmisaurus Erliansaurus Ganzhousaurus Heyuannia Jiangxisaurus Luanchuanraptor Mononykus Nankangia Nanshiungosaurus Neimongosaurus Nemegtomaia Nomingia Pyroraptor Rahonavis Rinchenia Saurornitholestes Struthiomimus altus Therizinosaurus Troodon Velociraptor Zanabazar
Corythoraptor; 1. Corythoraptor jacobsi	66 Ma	Nanxiong Formation, China		Acheroraptor Adasaurus Albertonykus Anzu Atrociraptor Austroraptor Avimimus Ceratonykus Dakotaraptor Elmisaurus Erliansaurus Ganzhousaurus Heyuannia Jiangxisaurus Luanchuanraptor Mononykus Nankangia Nanshiungosaurus Neimongosaurus Nemegtomaia Nomingia Pyroraptor Rahonavis Rinchenia Saurornitholestes Struthiomimus altus Therizinosaurus Troodon Velociraptor Zanabazar
†Dakotaraptor; 1. †Dakotaraptor steini	66 Ma	Hell Creek Formation, South Dakota, USA	A very large dromaeosaur; possibly a chimaeric genus.	Acheroraptor Adasaurus Albertonykus Anzu Atrociraptor Austroraptor Avimimus Ceratonykus Dakotaraptor Elmisaurus Erliansaurus Ganzhousaurus Heyuannia Jiangxisaurus Luanchuanraptor Mononykus Nankangia Nanshiungosaurus Neimongosaurus Nemegtomaia Nomingia Pyroraptor Rahonavis Rinchenia Saurornitholestes Struthiomimus altus Therizinosaurus Troodon Velociraptor Zanabazar
Dromaeosaurus; 1. Dromaeosaurus albertensis	80–69.7 Ma	Dinosaur Park Formation, Alberta, Canada Prince Creek Formation, Alaska, USA		Acheroraptor Adasaurus Albertonykus Anzu Atrociraptor Austroraptor Avimimus Ceratonykus Dakotaraptor Elmisaurus Erliansaurus Ganzhousaurus Heyuannia Jiangxisaurus Luanchuanraptor Mononykus Nankangia Nanshiungosaurus Neimongosaurus Nemegtomaia Nomingia Pyroraptor Rahonavis Rinchenia Saurornitholestes Struthiomimus altus Therizinosaurus Troodon Velociraptor Zanabazar
†Elmisaurus; 1. †Elmisaurus rarus	70 Ma	Nemegt Formation, Omnogovi Province, Mongolia	An elmisaurine caenagnathid, once thought to be a Mongolian species of Chirostenotes.	Acheroraptor Adasaurus Albertonykus Anzu Atrociraptor Austroraptor Avimimus Ceratonykus Dakotaraptor Elmisaurus Erliansaurus Ganzhousaurus Heyuannia Jiangxisaurus Luanchuanraptor Mononykus Nankangia Nanshiungosaurus Neimongosaurus Nemegtomaia Nomingia Pyroraptor Rahonavis Rinchenia Saurornitholestes Struthiomimus altus Therizinosaurus Troodon Velociraptor Zanabazar
†Elopteryx; 1. †Elopteryx nopcsai	70 Ma	Sanpetru Formation, Hunedoara County, Romania	A largely viewed as dubious maniraptoran, possibly a troodontid, originally believed to be a pelecaniform bird.	Acheroraptor Adasaurus Albertonykus Anzu Atrociraptor Austroraptor Avimimus Ceratonykus Dakotaraptor Elmisaurus Erliansaurus Ganzhousaurus Heyuannia Jiangxisaurus Luanchuanraptor Mononykus Nankangia Nanshiungosaurus Neimongosaurus Nemegtomaia Nomingia Pyroraptor Rahonavis Rinchenia Saurornitholestes Struthiomimus altus Therizinosaurus Troodon Velociraptor Zanabazar
†Epichirostenotes; 1. †Epichirostenotes curriei	72 Ma	Horseshoe Canyon Formation, Alberta, Canada	A caenagnathine caenagnathid originally thought to be the same species as Chirostenotes.	Acheroraptor Adasaurus Albertonykus Anzu Atrociraptor Austroraptor Avimimus Ceratonykus Dakotaraptor Elmisaurus Erliansaurus Ganzhousaurus Heyuannia Jiangxisaurus Luanchuanraptor Mononykus Nankangia Nanshiungosaurus Neimongosaurus Nemegtomaia Nomingia Pyroraptor Rahonavis Rinchenia Saurornitholestes Struthiomimus altus Therizinosaurus Troodon Velociraptor Zanabazar
†Erliansaurus; 1. †Erliansaurus bellamanus	85-68 Ma	Iren Dabasu Formation, Inner Mongolia, China	A therizinosauroid that, for a therizinosaur, had a rather short neck.	Acheroraptor Adasaurus Albertonykus Anzu Atrociraptor Austroraptor Avimimus Ceratonykus Dakotaraptor Elmisaurus Erliansaurus Ganzhousaurus Heyuannia Jiangxisaurus Luanchuanraptor Mononykus Nankangia Nanshiungosaurus Neimongosaurus Nemegtomaia Nomingia Pyroraptor Rahonavis Rinchenia Saurornitholestes Struthiomimus altus Therizinosaurus Troodon Velociraptor Zanabazar
†Euronychodon; 1. †Euronychodon portucalensis	92-70 Ma	Portugal	A troodontid with teeth similar to those of Paronychodon.	Acheroraptor Adasaurus Albertonykus Anzu Atrociraptor Austroraptor Avimimus Ceratonykus Dakotaraptor Elmisaurus Erliansaurus Ganzhousaurus Heyuannia Jiangxisaurus Luanchuanraptor Mononykus Nankangia Nanshiungosaurus Neimongosaurus Nemegtomaia Nomingia Pyroraptor Rahonavis Rinchenia Saurornitholestes Struthiomimus altus Therizinosaurus Troodon Velociraptor Zanabazar
†Ganzhousaurus; 1. †Ganzhousaurus nankangensis	72-66 Ma	Nanxiong Formation, Jiangxi, China	An oviraptorine oviraptorid distinguished by a combination of primitive and derived features.	Acheroraptor Adasaurus Albertonykus Anzu Atrociraptor Austroraptor Avimimus Ceratonykus Dakotaraptor Elmisaurus Erliansaurus Ganzhousaurus Heyuannia Jiangxisaurus Luanchuanraptor Mononykus Nankangia Nanshiungosaurus Neimongosaurus Nemegtomaia Nomingia Pyroraptor Rahonavis Rinchenia Saurornitholestes Struthiomimus altus Therizinosaurus Troodon Velociraptor Zanabazar
†Gobiraptor; 1. †Gobiraptor minutus	70 Ma	Nemegt Formation, Omnogovi Province, Mongolia	An oviraptorid.	Acheroraptor Adasaurus Albertonykus Anzu Atrociraptor Austroraptor Avimimus Ceratonykus Dakotaraptor Elmisaurus Erliansaurus Ganzhousaurus Heyuannia Jiangxisaurus Luanchuanraptor Mononykus Nankangia Nanshiungosaurus Neimongosaurus Nemegtomaia Nomingia Pyroraptor Rahonavis Rinchenia Saurornitholestes Struthiomimus altus Therizinosaurus Troodon Velociraptor Zanabazar
†Heptasteornis; 1. †Heptasteornis andrewsi	67-66 Ma	Sânpetru Formation, Hunedaora County, Romania	An alvarezsaurid originally presumed to be a giant prehistoric owl.	Acheroraptor Adasaurus Albertonykus Anzu Atrociraptor Austroraptor Avimimus Ceratonykus Dakotaraptor Elmisaurus Erliansaurus Ganzhousaurus Heyuannia Jiangxisaurus Luanchuanraptor Mononykus Nankangia Nanshiungosaurus Neimongosaurus Nemegtomaia Nomingia Pyroraptor Rahonavis Rinchenia Saurornitholestes Struthiomimus altus Therizinosaurus Troodon Velociraptor Zanabazar
†Heyuannia; 1. †Heyuannia huangi	70-66 Ma	Dalangshan Formation, Guangdong, China	An oviraptorine that was the first oviraptorid found in China.	Acheroraptor Adasaurus Albertonykus Anzu Atrociraptor Austroraptor Avimimus Ceratonykus Dakotaraptor Elmisaurus Erliansaurus Ganzhousaurus Heyuannia Jiangxisaurus Luanchuanraptor Mononykus Nankangia Nanshiungosaurus Neimongosaurus Nemegtomaia Nomingia Pyroraptor Rahonavis Rinchenia Saurornitholestes Struthiomimus altus Therizinosaurus Troodon Velociraptor Zanabazar
†Hulsanpes; †Hulsanpes perlei	70 Ma	Barun Goyot Formation, Omnogovi Province, Mongolia	A halszkaraptorine dromaeosaur.	Acheroraptor Adasaurus Albertonykus Anzu Atrociraptor Austroraptor Avimimus Ceratonykus Dakotaraptor Elmisaurus Erliansaurus Ganzhousaurus Heyuannia Jiangxisaurus Luanchuanraptor Mononykus Nankangia Nanshiungosaurus Neimongosaurus Nemegtomaia Nomingia Pyroraptor Rahonavis Rinchenia Saurornitholestes Struthiomimus altus Therizinosaurus Troodon Velociraptor Zanabazar
†Imperobator; 1. †Imperobator antarcticus	71 Ma	Snow Hill Island Formation, James Ross Island, Antarctica	A paravian, one of the first non-avian theropods described from Cretaceous Antarctica.	Acheroraptor Adasaurus Albertonykus Anzu Atrociraptor Austroraptor Avimimus Ceratonykus Dakotaraptor Elmisaurus Erliansaurus Ganzhousaurus Heyuannia Jiangxisaurus Luanchuanraptor Mononykus Nankangia Nanshiungosaurus Neimongosaurus Nemegtomaia Nomingia Pyroraptor Rahonavis Rinchenia Saurornitholestes Struthiomimus altus Therizinosaurus Troodon Velociraptor Zanabazar
†Jiangxisaurus; 1. †Jiangxisaurus ganzhouensis	72–66 Ma	Nanxiong Formation, Jiangxi, China	An oviraptorid similar to Heyuannia	Acheroraptor Adasaurus Albertonykus Anzu Atrociraptor Austroraptor Avimimus Ceratonykus Dakotaraptor Elmisaurus Erliansaurus Ganzhousaurus Heyuannia Jiangxisaurus Luanchuanraptor Mononykus Nankangia Nanshiungosaurus Neimongosaurus Nemegtomaia Nomingia Pyroraptor Rahonavis Rinchenia Saurornitholestes Struthiomimus altus Therizinosaurus Troodon Velociraptor Zanabazar
†Luanchuanraptor; 1. †Luanchuanraptor henanensis	99.7–66 Ma, Cenomanian to Maastrichtian	Qiupa Formation, Henan, China	A moderately sized dromaeosaur, and the first Asian dromaeosaurid described from outside the Gobi Desert or northeastern China.	Acheroraptor Adasaurus Albertonykus Anzu Atrociraptor Austroraptor Avimimus Ceratonykus Dakotaraptor Elmisaurus Erliansaurus Ganzhousaurus Heyuannia Jiangxisaurus Luanchuanraptor Mononykus Nankangia Nanshiungosaurus Neimongosaurus Nemegtomaia Nomingia Pyroraptor Rahonavis Rinchenia Saurornitholestes Struthiomimus altus Therizinosaurus Troodon Velociraptor Zanabazar
†Leptorhynchos; 1. †Leptorhynchos elegans 2. †Leptorhynchos gaddisi	75–66 Ma, Campanian to Maastrichtian	Hell Creek Formation, Montana, USA Aguja Formation, Texas, USA	A elmisaurine caenagnathid that was once thought to be a species of Chirostenotes.	Acheroraptor Adasaurus Albertonykus Anzu Atrociraptor Austroraptor Avimimus Ceratonykus Dakotaraptor Elmisaurus Erliansaurus Ganzhousaurus Heyuannia Jiangxisaurus Luanchuanraptor Mononykus Nankangia Nanshiungosaurus Neimongosaurus Nemegtomaia Nomingia Pyroraptor Rahonavis Rinchenia Saurornitholestes Struthiomimus altus Therizinosaurus Troodon Velociraptor Zanabazar
†Mononykus; 1. †Mononykus olecranus	70 Ma	Nemegt Formation, Omnogovi Province, Mongolia	A parvicursorine alvarezsaurid	Acheroraptor Adasaurus Albertonykus Anzu Atrociraptor Austroraptor Avimimus Ceratonykus Dakotaraptor Elmisaurus Erliansaurus Ganzhousaurus Heyuannia Jiangxisaurus Luanchuanraptor Mononykus Nankangia Nanshiungosaurus Neimongosaurus Nemegtomaia Nomingia Pyroraptor Rahonavis Rinchenia Saurornitholestes Struthiomimus altus Therizinosaurus Troodon Velociraptor Zanabazar
†Nankangia; 1. †Nankangia jiangxiensis	72–66 Ma	Nanxiong Formation, Jiangxi, China	A caenagnathoid oviraptorosaur	Acheroraptor Adasaurus Albertonykus Anzu Atrociraptor Austroraptor Avimimus Ceratonykus Dakotaraptor Elmisaurus Erliansaurus Ganzhousaurus Heyuannia Jiangxisaurus Luanchuanraptor Mononykus Nankangia Nanshiungosaurus Neimongosaurus Nemegtomaia Nomingia Pyroraptor Rahonavis Rinchenia Saurornitholestes Struthiomimus altus Therizinosaurus Troodon Velociraptor Zanabazar
†Nanshiungosaurus; 1. †Nanshiungosaurus brevispinus	67-66 Ma	Nanxiong Formation, Jiangxi, China	A therizinosaurid	Acheroraptor Adasaurus Albertonykus Anzu Atrociraptor Austroraptor Avimimus Ceratonykus Dakotaraptor Elmisaurus Erliansaurus Ganzhousaurus Heyuannia Jiangxisaurus Luanchuanraptor Mononykus Nankangia Nanshiungosaurus Neimongosaurus Nemegtomaia Nomingia Pyroraptor Rahonavis Rinchenia Saurornitholestes Struthiomimus altus Therizinosaurus Troodon Velociraptor Zanabazar
†Neimongosaurus; 1. †Neimongosaurus yangi	85-68 Ma	Iren Dabasu Formation, Inner Mongolia, China	A therizinosauroid	Acheroraptor Adasaurus Albertonykus Anzu Atrociraptor Austroraptor Avimimus Ceratonykus Dakotaraptor Elmisaurus Erliansaurus Ganzhousaurus Heyuannia Jiangxisaurus Luanchuanraptor Mononykus Nankangia Nanshiungosaurus Neimongosaurus Nemegtomaia Nomingia Pyroraptor Rahonavis Rinchenia Saurornitholestes Struthiomimus altus Therizinosaurus Troodon Velociraptor Zanabazar
†Nemegtomaia; 1. †Nemegtomaia barsboldi	70 Ma	Nemegt Formation, Omnogovi Province, Mongolia	An oviraptorine oviraptorid	Acheroraptor Adasaurus Albertonykus Anzu Atrociraptor Austroraptor Avimimus Ceratonykus Dakotaraptor Elmisaurus Erliansaurus Ganzhousaurus Heyuannia Jiangxisaurus Luanchuanraptor Mononykus Nankangia Nanshiungosaurus Neimongosaurus Nemegtomaia Nomingia Pyroraptor Rahonavis Rinchenia Saurornitholestes Struthiomimus altus Therizinosaurus Troodon Velociraptor Zanabazar
†Nomingia; 1. †Nomingia gobiensis	70 Ma	Nemegt Formation, Omnogovi Province, Mongolia	An oviraptorid characterized by a pygostyle-like mass of five fused vertebrae at the tail end, which probably supported a feather fan like Caudipteryx.	Acheroraptor Adasaurus Albertonykus Anzu Atrociraptor Austroraptor Avimimus Ceratonykus Dakotaraptor Elmisaurus Erliansaurus Ganzhousaurus Heyuannia Jiangxisaurus Luanchuanraptor Mononykus Nankangia Nanshiungosaurus Neimongosaurus Nemegtomaia Nomingia Pyroraptor Rahonavis Rinchenia Saurornitholestes Struthiomimus altus Therizinosaurus Troodon Velociraptor Zanabazar
†Ojoraptorsaurus; 1. †Ojoraptorsaurus boerei	69-66 Ma	Ojo Alamo Formation, New Mexico, USA	A caenagnathid known from an incomplete pair of fused pubic bones.	Acheroraptor Adasaurus Albertonykus Anzu Atrociraptor Austroraptor Avimimus Ceratonykus Dakotaraptor Elmisaurus Erliansaurus Ganzhousaurus Heyuannia Jiangxisaurus Luanchuanraptor Mononykus Nankangia Nanshiungosaurus Neimongosaurus Nemegtomaia Nomingia Pyroraptor Rahonavis Rinchenia Saurornitholestes Struthiomimus altus Therizinosaurus Troodon Velociraptor Zanabazar
†Paronychodon; 1. †Paronychodon caperatus	75-66 Ma	Hell Creek Formation, North Dakota, USA Lance Formation, Wyoming, USA	A disputed coelurosaur, mainly believed to be a troodontid.	Acheroraptor Adasaurus Albertonykus Anzu Atrociraptor Austroraptor Avimimus Ceratonykus Dakotaraptor Elmisaurus Erliansaurus Ganzhousaurus Heyuannia Jiangxisaurus Luanchuanraptor Mononykus Nankangia Nanshiungosaurus Neimongosaurus Nemegtomaia Nomingia Pyroraptor Rahonavis Rinchenia Saurornitholestes Struthiomimus altus Therizinosaurus Troodon Velociraptor Zanabazar
†Pectinodon; 1. †Pectinodon bakkeri	66 Ma	Lance Formation, Wyoming, USA	A troodontid that has been historically considered synonymous with Troodon, now a valid genus.	Acheroraptor Adasaurus Albertonykus Anzu Atrociraptor Austroraptor Avimimus Ceratonykus Dakotaraptor Elmisaurus Erliansaurus Ganzhousaurus Heyuannia Jiangxisaurus Luanchuanraptor Mononykus Nankangia Nanshiungosaurus Neimongosaurus Nemegtomaia Nomingia Pyroraptor Rahonavis Rinchenia Saurornitholestes Struthiomimus altus Therizinosaurus Troodon Velociraptor Zanabazar
†Pyroraptor; 1. †Pyroraptor olympius	70.6 Ma	France	A dromaeosaur known only from a few bones: the distinctive foot claws, as well as fossilized teeth, arm and vertebrae.	Acheroraptor Adasaurus Albertonykus Anzu Atrociraptor Austroraptor Avimimus Ceratonykus Dakotaraptor Elmisaurus Erliansaurus Ganzhousaurus Heyuannia Jiangxisaurus Luanchuanraptor Mononykus Nankangia Nanshiungosaurus Neimongosaurus Nemegtomaia Nomingia Pyroraptor Rahonavis Rinchenia Saurornitholestes Struthiomimus altus Therizinosaurus Troodon Velociraptor Zanabazar
†Rahonavis; 1. †Rahonavis ostromi	70 Ma	Maevarano Formation, Mahajanga Province, Madagascar	A small unenlagiine dromaeosaur with possible gliding abilities	Acheroraptor Adasaurus Albertonykus Anzu Atrociraptor Austroraptor Avimimus Ceratonykus Dakotaraptor Elmisaurus Erliansaurus Ganzhousaurus Heyuannia Jiangxisaurus Luanchuanraptor Mononykus Nankangia Nanshiungosaurus Neimongosaurus Nemegtomaia Nomingia Pyroraptor Rahonavis Rinchenia Saurornitholestes Struthiomimus altus Therizinosaurus Troodon Velociraptor Zanabazar
†Rinchenia; 1. †Rinchenia mongoliensis	70 Ma	Nemegt Formation, Omnogovi Province, Mongolia	An oviraptorid originally classified as a species of Oviraptor	Acheroraptor Adasaurus Albertonykus Anzu Atrociraptor Austroraptor Avimimus Ceratonykus Dakotaraptor Elmisaurus Erliansaurus Ganzhousaurus Heyuannia Jiangxisaurus Luanchuanraptor Mononykus Nankangia Nanshiungosaurus Neimongosaurus Nemegtomaia Nomingia Pyroraptor Rahonavis Rinchenia Saurornitholestes Struthiomimus altus Therizinosaurus Troodon Velociraptor Zanabazar
†Saurornitholestes; 1. †Saurornitholestes langstoni	77–69 Ma, Campanian to Maastrichtian	Canada USA	A saurornitholestine dromaeosaur that was more long-legged and lightly built than other dromaeosaurs.	Acheroraptor Adasaurus Albertonykus Anzu Atrociraptor Austroraptor Avimimus Ceratonykus Dakotaraptor Elmisaurus Erliansaurus Ganzhousaurus Heyuannia Jiangxisaurus Luanchuanraptor Mononykus Nankangia Nanshiungosaurus Neimongosaurus Nemegtomaia Nomingia Pyroraptor Rahonavis Rinchenia Saurornitholestes Struthiomimus altus Therizinosaurus Troodon Velociraptor Zanabazar
†Shixinggia; 1. †Shixinggia oblita	70 Ma	Guangdong, China	An oviraptorid	Acheroraptor Adasaurus Albertonykus Anzu Atrociraptor Austroraptor Avimimus Ceratonykus Dakotaraptor Elmisaurus Erliansaurus Ganzhousaurus Heyuannia Jiangxisaurus Luanchuanraptor Mononykus Nankangia Nanshiungosaurus Neimongosaurus Nemegtomaia Nomingia Pyroraptor Rahonavis Rinchenia Saurornitholestes Struthiomimus altus Therizinosaurus Troodon Velociraptor Zanabazar
†Tamarro; 1. †Tamarro insperatus	67.6-66 Ma	Talarn Formation, Spain	A jinfengopterygine troodontid, the first known from Europe.	Acheroraptor Adasaurus Albertonykus Anzu Atrociraptor Austroraptor Avimimus Ceratonykus Dakotaraptor Elmisaurus Erliansaurus Ganzhousaurus Heyuannia Jiangxisaurus Luanchuanraptor Mononykus Nankangia Nanshiungosaurus Neimongosaurus Nemegtomaia Nomingia Pyroraptor Rahonavis Rinchenia Saurornitholestes Struthiomimus altus Therizinosaurus Troodon Velociraptor Zanabazar
†Therizinosaurus; 1. †Therizinosaurus cheloniformis	75-66 Ma, Campanian to Maastrichtian	Nemegt Formation, Omnogovi Province, Mongolia	A therizinosaurid, one of the last and largest therizinosaurs.	Acheroraptor Adasaurus Albertonykus Anzu Atrociraptor Austroraptor Avimimus Ceratonykus Dakotaraptor Elmisaurus Erliansaurus Ganzhousaurus Heyuannia Jiangxisaurus Luanchuanraptor Mononykus Nankangia Nanshiungosaurus Neimongosaurus Nemegtomaia Nomingia Pyroraptor Rahonavis Rinchenia Saurornitholestes Struthiomimus altus Therizinosaurus Troodon Velociraptor Zanabazar
†Tochisaurus; 1. †Tochisaurus nemegtensis	69 Ma	Nemegt Formation, Omnogovi Province, Mongolia	A relatively large troodontid.	Acheroraptor Adasaurus Albertonykus Anzu Atrociraptor Austroraptor Avimimus Ceratonykus Dakotaraptor Elmisaurus Erliansaurus Ganzhousaurus Heyuannia Jiangxisaurus Luanchuanraptor Mononykus Nankangia Nanshiungosaurus Neimongosaurus Nemegtomaia Nomingia Pyroraptor Rahonavis Rinchenia Saurornitholestes Struthiomimus altus Therizinosaurus Troodon Velociraptor Zanabazar
†Troodon; 1. †Troodon formosus	77.5–71 Ma, Campanian to Maastrichtian	Judith River Formation, Montana US	A troodontid, from the late Cretaceous known from a few teeth.	Acheroraptor Adasaurus Albertonykus Anzu Atrociraptor Austroraptor Avimimus Ceratonykus Dakotaraptor Elmisaurus Erliansaurus Ganzhousaurus Heyuannia Jiangxisaurus Luanchuanraptor Mononykus Nankangia Nanshiungosaurus Neimongosaurus Nemegtomaia Nomingia Pyroraptor Rahonavis Rinchenia Saurornitholestes Struthiomimus altus Therizinosaurus Troodon Velociraptor Zanabazar
†Variraptor; 1. †Variraptor mechinorum	70 Ma	Grès à Reptiles Formation, Provence-Alpes-Côte d'Azur, France	A dromaeosaur	Acheroraptor Adasaurus Albertonykus Anzu Atrociraptor Austroraptor Avimimus Ceratonykus Dakotaraptor Elmisaurus Erliansaurus Ganzhousaurus Heyuannia Jiangxisaurus Luanchuanraptor Mononykus Nankangia Nanshiungosaurus Neimongosaurus Nemegtomaia Nomingia Pyroraptor Rahonavis Rinchenia Saurornitholestes Struthiomimus altus Therizinosaurus Troodon Velociraptor Zanabazar
†Velociraptor; 1. †Velociraptor mongoliensis	75–66 Ma, Campanian to Maastrichtian	Djadochta Formation, Omnogovi Province, Mongolia	A velociraptorine dromaeosaur, one of the most familiar genera.	Acheroraptor Adasaurus Albertonykus Anzu Atrociraptor Austroraptor Avimimus Ceratonykus Dakotaraptor Elmisaurus Erliansaurus Ganzhousaurus Heyuannia Jiangxisaurus Luanchuanraptor Mononykus Nankangia Nanshiungosaurus Neimongosaurus Nemegtomaia Nomingia Pyroraptor Rahonavis Rinchenia Saurornitholestes Struthiomimus altus Therizinosaurus Troodon Velociraptor Zanabazar
†Yulong; 1. †Yulong mini	99.7–66 Ma, Cenomanian to Maastrichtian	Qiupa Formation, Henan, China	One of the smallest-known oviraptorids.	Acheroraptor Adasaurus Albertonykus Anzu Atrociraptor Austroraptor Avimimus Ceratonykus Dakotaraptor Elmisaurus Erliansaurus Ganzhousaurus Heyuannia Jiangxisaurus Luanchuanraptor Mononykus Nankangia Nanshiungosaurus Neimongosaurus Nemegtomaia Nomingia Pyroraptor Rahonavis Rinchenia Saurornitholestes Struthiomimus altus Therizinosaurus Troodon Velociraptor Zanabazar
†Zanabazar; 1. †Zanabazar junior	70 Ma	Nemegt Formation, Omnogovi Province, Mongolia	A troodontid, originally classified as a species of Saurornithoides.	Acheroraptor Adasaurus Albertonykus Anzu Atrociraptor Austroraptor Avimimus Ceratonykus Dakotaraptor Elmisaurus Erliansaurus Ganzhousaurus Heyuannia Jiangxisaurus Luanchuanraptor Mononykus Nankangia Nanshiungosaurus Neimongosaurus Nemegtomaia Nomingia Pyroraptor Rahonavis Rinchenia Saurornitholestes Struthiomimus altus Therizinosaurus Troodon Velociraptor Zanabazar

===== Avialans (avian theropods) =====
Birds of the Maastrichtian
Taxa	Presence	Location	Description	Images
†Alamitornis; †Alamitornis minutus	70 Ma	Los Alamitos Formation, Rio Negro Province, Argentina	A basal euornithine, possibly a patagopterygiform.	Avisaurus Balaur Enantiornis Vegavis
†Anatalavis; †Anatalavis rex	66–55 Ma, Maastrichtian to Danian	Hornerstown Formation, New Jersey, USA	An anseriform, possibly resembling the magpie goose.	Avisaurus Balaur Enantiornis Vegavis
†Asiahesperornis; †Asiahesperornis bazhanovi	70 Ma	Kazakhstan	A hesperornithine that lived on the shores of the shallow Turgai Sea.	Avisaurus Balaur Enantiornis Vegavis
†Asteriornis; †Asteriornis maastrichtensis	66.8-66.9 Ma	Belgium		Avisaurus Balaur Enantiornis Vegavis
†Avisaurus; †Avisaurus archibaldi; †Avisaurus gloriae	70.6–66 Ma	Hell Creek Formation, Montana, USA	A genus of avisaurid enantiornithine that is known from the humid low-lying swamps, lakes and river basins of the western shore of the Western Interior Seaway.	Avisaurus Balaur Enantiornis Vegavis
†Balaur; 1. †Balaur bondoc	70 Ma	Sebes Formation, Alba County Romania	An avialian from Romania	Avisaurus Balaur Enantiornis Vegavis
†Brodavis; †Brodavis americanus; †Brodavis baileyi; †Brodavis mongoliensis	80.5-66 Ma	Frenchman Formation, Alberta & Saskatchewan, Canada Hell Creek Formation, South Dakota, USA: Nemegt Formation, Omnogovi Province, Mongolia	A freshwater, possibly flighted hesperornithine dating back to the Campanian.	Avisaurus Balaur Enantiornis Vegavis
†Canadaga; †Canadaga arctica	67 Ma	Bylot Island, Nunavut, Canada	A genus of hesperornithine that, unlike its relatives which are mainly known from subtropical or tropical waters, seemed to have ranged in temperate or even subarctic areas.	Avisaurus Balaur Enantiornis Vegavis
†Ceramornis; †Ceramornis major	66 Ma	Lance Formation, Wyoming, USA	A charadriiform that might be mistaken for an anseriform.	Avisaurus Balaur Enantiornis Vegavis
†Cimolopteryx; †Cimolopteryx maxima; †Cimolopteryx minima; †Cimolopteryx rara; †Cimolopteryx petra	66 Ma, Campanian to Maastrichtian	Lance Formation, Wyoming, USA Hell Creek Formation, Montana, USA	A fairly small charadriiform, with a maximum size about equal to that of a small gull.	Avisaurus Balaur Enantiornis Vegavis
†Elbretornis; †Elbertornis bonapartei	70 Ma	Lecho Formation, Salta Province, Argentina	A euenantiornithine.	Avisaurus Balaur Enantiornis Vegavis
†Enantiornis; †Enantiornis leali	70 Ma	Argentina	Among the largest enantiornithines discovered to date, having an ecological niche resembling that of a mid-sized accipitrid.	Avisaurus Balaur Enantiornis Vegavis
†Gargantuavis; †Gargantuavis philoinos	73.5-71.5 Ma	Marnes Rouges Inferieures Formation, France	A large flightless euornithine bird that occupied an ecological niche somewhat similar to that of modern ratites or certain non-avian dinosaurs. Its eggs were previously attributed to titanosaurs.	Avisaurus Balaur Enantiornis Vegavis
†Graculavus; †Graculavus augustus	68-62 Ma	Lance Formation, Wyoming, USA	A charadriiform that lived on the shores of the northwestern Atlantic and the Western Interior Seaway.	Avisaurus Balaur Enantiornis Vegavis
†Gurilynia; †Gurilynia nessovi	70–66 Ma	Nemegt Formation, Omnogovi Province, Mongolia	A euenantiornithine known from three partial bones.	Avisaurus Balaur Enantiornis Vegavis
†Hesperornis; †Hesperornis regalis; †Hesperornis crassipes; †Hesperornis gracilis; †Hesperornis altus; †Hesperornis montana; †Hesperornis rossicus; †Hesperornis bairdi; †Hesperornis chowi; †Hesperornis macdonaldi; †Hesperornis mengeli	83.5–66 Ma, Campanian to Maastrichtian			Avisaurus Balaur Enantiornis Vegavis
†Judinornis; †Judinornis nogontsavensis	70 Ma	Nemegt Formation, Omnogovi Province, Mongolia	A basal hesperornithine that, unlike its relatives, apparently lived in estuaries and rivers from the mountains thrown up by the Cimmerian Orogeny through the arid lands of continental East Asia towards the Turgai Sea and the former Shigatze Ocean.	Avisaurus Balaur Enantiornis Vegavis
†Laornis; †Laornis edvardsianus	66–63 Ma, Maastrichtian to Danian	Hornerstown Formation, New Jersey, USA	A neognath that may have been semiaquatic.	Avisaurus Balaur Enantiornis Vegavis
†Lectavis; †Lectavis bretincola	70.6–66 Ma	Lecho Formation, Salta Province, Argentina	A genus of euenantiornithine with uncertain evolutionary affinities, it had legs resembling and a body approximately the size of a modern curlew.	Avisaurus Balaur Enantiornis Vegavis
†Martinavis; †Martinavis cruzyensis; †Martinavis minor; †Martinavis saltariensis; †Martinavis vincei; †Martinavis whetstonei	75–70 Ma, Campanian to Maastrichtian	Lecho Formation, Salta Province, Argentina Gres a Reptiles Formation, Provence-Alpes-Côte d'Azur, France	A euenantiornithine known mostly from a collection of humeruses per species.	Avisaurus Balaur Enantiornis Vegavis
†Neogaeornis; †Neogaeornis wetzeli	70–67 Ma	Quiriquina Formation, Quiriquina Island, Chile	A rare hesperornithine closely related to Baptornis (yet some believe it to be a gaviiform). Though apparently somewhat migratory, it is only known from temperate to warm subtropical climates, and it seems that towards the end of the Cretaceous their range shifted towards the South Pole.	Avisaurus Balaur Enantiornis Vegavis
†Palintropus; †Palintropus retusus	76.5-66 Ma	Lance Formation, Wyoming, USA	A poorly-known bird that is sometimes believed to be an early charadriiform or galliform. It is now primarily known to be an ambiortiform.	Avisaurus Balaur Enantiornis Vegavis
†Polarornis; †Polarornis gregorii	66 Ma	López de Bertodano Formation, Seymour Island, Antarctica	A gaviiform that was semiaquatic is suggested to be flightless or near-flightless, feeding on fish and large invertebrates. It was very similar to its loon relatives, as well as to grebes, hesperornithines, and penguins.	Avisaurus Balaur Enantiornis Vegavis
†Potamornis; †Potamornis skutchi	66 Ma	Lance Formation, Wyoming, USA	A hesperornithine with unclear relationships.	Avisaurus Balaur Enantiornis Vegavis
†Soroavisaurus; †Soroavisaurus australis	70 Ma	Lecho Formation, Salta Province, Argentina	An avisaurid known from only a few remains.	Avisaurus Balaur Enantiornis Vegavis
†Telmatornis; †Telmatornis priscus	71–68 Ma	Navesink Formation, New Jersey, USA	A charadriiform with grebe-like forelimbs	Avisaurus Balaur Enantiornis Vegavis
†Teviornis; †Teviornis gobiensis	70 Ma	Nemegt Formation, Omnogovi Province, Mongolia	A presbyornithid known from pieces of a crushed right forelimb.	Avisaurus Balaur Enantiornis Vegavis
†Tytthostonyx; †Tytthostonyx glauconiticus	66 Ma	Hornerstown Formation, New Jersey, USA	A little-known bird of unclear affiliations.	Avisaurus Balaur Enantiornis Vegavis
†Vegavis; †Vegavis iaai	68–66 Ma	López de Bertodano Formation, Vega Island, Antarctica	An anseriform known from very few bones.	Avisaurus Balaur Enantiornis Vegavis
†Vorona; †Vorona berivotrensis	70 Ma, Campanian to Maastrichtian	Maevarano Formation, Mahajanga Province, Madagascar	A euornithine sometimes confused with Rahonavis, a confusion that has led to the common misconception that Vorona had a dromaeosaur-like sickle claw on each foot.	Avisaurus Balaur Enantiornis Vegavis
†Yungavolucris; †Yungavolucris brevipedalis	70.6–66 Ma	Lecho Formation, Salta Province, Argentina	A small, little-known euenantiornithine that may have been adapted for swimming.	Avisaurus Balaur Enantiornis Vegavis

== Cartilaginous fish ==
Cartilaginous fish of the Maastrichtian
Taxa	Presence	Location	Description	Images
†Coupatezia; 1. †Coupatezia trempina			A myliobatiform ray whose genus survived into the Lutetian.	Squalicorax kaupi
†Cretolamna	Turonian to Ypresian			Squalicorax kaupi
†Ctenopristis				Squalicorax kaupi
†Dalpiazia				Squalicorax kaupi
Dasyatis	100–0 Ma, Cenomanian to present			Squalicorax kaupi
†Ganopristis				Squalicorax kaupi
†Gibbechinorhinus				Squalicorax kaupi
†Igdabatis				Squalicorax kaupi
†Microetmopterus				Squalicorax kaupi
†Paraginglymostoma				Squalicorax kaupi
†Parasquatina				Squalicorax kaupi
†Proetmopterus				Squalicorax kaupi
†Pucabatis				Squalicorax kaupi
†Pucapristis				Squalicorax kaupi
Raja	70–0 Ma, Maastrichtian to present			Squalicorax kaupi
†Rhombodus; 1. †Rhombodus binkhorsti 2. †Rhombodus levis				Squalicorax kaupi
†Schizorhiza				Squalicorax kaupi
†Squalicorax; 1. †Squalicorax kaupi 2. †Squalicorax pristodontus	80–66 Ma, Campanian to Maastrichtian	New Zealand Japan: Kazakhstan; Jordan; France; Netherlands; Egypt; Morocco; Madagascar; USA; Syria; Israel; Bulgaria; Brazil; Russia; Ukraine; Sweden		Squalicorax kaupi

== Crocodylomorphs ==
Crocodylomorphs of the Maastrichtian
Taxa	Presence	Location	Description	Images
†Acynodon; 1. †Acynodon iberoccitanus 2. †Acynodon lopezi	Early Campanian - Late Maastrichtian 83.5–66 Ma	France, Spain, Italy, and Slovenia	Initially placed within Alligatoridae but has since been reclassified as a more basal globidontan, the oldest and most primitive known to date.	Adamantinasuchus Allodaposuchus precedens Armadillosuchus Araripesuchus wegeneri Brachychampsa Baurusuchus salgadoensis Chenanisuchus Itasuchus Mahajangasuchus Mariliasuchus Montealtosuchus Morrinhosuchus Simosuchus Stratiotosuchus Uberabasuchus
†Adamantinasuchus; 1. †Adamantinasuchus navae	72.1–68 Ma	Adamantina Formation, Brazil	A notosuchian.	Adamantinasuchus Allodaposuchus precedens Armadillosuchus Araripesuchus wegeneri Brachychampsa Baurusuchus salgadoensis Chenanisuchus Itasuchus Mahajangasuchus Mariliasuchus Montealtosuchus Morrinhosuchus Simosuchus Stratiotosuchus Uberabasuchus
†Allodaposuchus; 1. †Allodaposuchus palustris 2. †Allodaposuchus precedens	84.9–66.043 Ma	Conques Formation, Province of Huesca, Aragon, Spain Romania	An average-sized eusuchian, growing to around 3 m (9.8 ft) long. The main feature that distinguishes this species from other related crocodylomorphs is the orientation of a groove at the back of the skull called the cranioquadrate passage; unlike the cranioquadrate passages of other crocodylomorphs, which are only visible at the back of the skull, the cranioquadrate passage of this variety is visible when the skull is viewed from the side.	Adamantinasuchus Allodaposuchus precedens Armadillosuchus Araripesuchus wegeneri Brachychampsa Baurusuchus salgadoensis Chenanisuchus Itasuchus Mahajangasuchus Mariliasuchus Montealtosuchus Morrinhosuchus Simosuchus Stratiotosuchus Uberabasuchus
†Araripesuchus; 1. †Araripesuchus tsangatsangana	125–66 Ma	Maevarano Formation, Mahajanga Province, Madagascar	A uruguaysuchid that can be distinguished by their laterally bulged edges of the snout, with the bulge being the most prominent around the area of an enlarged maxillary tooth.	Adamantinasuchus Allodaposuchus precedens Armadillosuchus Araripesuchus wegeneri Brachychampsa Baurusuchus salgadoensis Chenanisuchus Itasuchus Mahajangasuchus Mariliasuchus Montealtosuchus Morrinhosuchus Simosuchus Stratiotosuchus Uberabasuchus
†Arenysuchus; 1. †Arenysuchus gascabadiolorum	67.6–66 Ma	Tremp Formation, province of Huesca, Aragon, Spain	A crocodyloid known a partial skull and four teeth. One feature linking it to early crocodilians is the contact of the frontal bones with the margin of the supratemporal fenestrae, two holes in the top of the skull. The frontal bone is also unusual in that its front end is extremely long. A sharp projection of the frontal divides the nasal bones, making up most of the midline length of the snout. Usually, the nasal bones would occupy the midline and the frontal would be restricted near the eye sockets. Near the frontal, the lacrimal bones are unusually wide in comparison to their length.	Adamantinasuchus Allodaposuchus precedens Armadillosuchus Araripesuchus wegeneri Brachychampsa Baurusuchus salgadoensis Chenanisuchus Itasuchus Mahajangasuchus Mariliasuchus Montealtosuchus Morrinhosuchus Simosuchus Stratiotosuchus Uberabasuchus
†Armadillosuchus; 1. †Armadillosuchus arrudai	~72–68 Ma	Adamantina Formation, Brazil	A notosuchian.	Adamantinasuchus Allodaposuchus precedens Armadillosuchus Araripesuchus wegeneri Brachychampsa Baurusuchus salgadoensis Chenanisuchus Itasuchus Mahajangasuchus Mariliasuchus Montealtosuchus Morrinhosuchus Simosuchus Stratiotosuchus Uberabasuchus
†Barreirosuchus; 1. †Barreirosuchus franciscoi	~72–68 Ma	Adamantina Formation, Brazil	A trematochampsid.	Adamantinasuchus Allodaposuchus precedens Armadillosuchus Araripesuchus wegeneri Brachychampsa Baurusuchus salgadoensis Chenanisuchus Itasuchus Mahajangasuchus Mariliasuchus Montealtosuchus Morrinhosuchus Simosuchus Stratiotosuchus Uberabasuchus
†Baurusuchus; 1. †Baurusuchus albertoi 2. †Baurusuchus pachechoi 3. †Baurusuchus salgadoensis	~72–68 Ma	Adamantina Formation, Brazil	A baurusuchid notosuchian.	Adamantinasuchus Allodaposuchus precedens Armadillosuchus Araripesuchus wegeneri Brachychampsa Baurusuchus salgadoensis Chenanisuchus Itasuchus Mahajangasuchus Mariliasuchus Montealtosuchus Morrinhosuchus Simosuchus Stratiotosuchus Uberabasuchus
†Borealosuchus; 1. †Borealosuchus sternbergii	Late Cretaceous–Eocene	Colorado, Montana, North Dakota, South Dakota, Wyoming	A medium-sized crocodilian genus that lived into the Eocene. Borealosuchus sternbergii is the most basal out of the six species in the genus and the one known from the Cretaceous.	Adamantinasuchus Allodaposuchus precedens Armadillosuchus Araripesuchus wegeneri Brachychampsa Baurusuchus salgadoensis Chenanisuchus Itasuchus Mahajangasuchus Mariliasuchus Montealtosuchus Morrinhosuchus Simosuchus Stratiotosuchus Uberabasuchus
†Brachychampsa; 1. †Brachychampsa montana	83.5–63.3 Ma	Hell Creek Formation, Montana, USA	A globidontan distinguished by an enlarged fourth maxillary tooth in the upper jaw. Its genus dates back to the Campanian and lived until the Danian.	Adamantinasuchus Allodaposuchus precedens Armadillosuchus Araripesuchus wegeneri Brachychampsa Baurusuchus salgadoensis Chenanisuchus Itasuchus Mahajangasuchus Mariliasuchus Montealtosuchus Morrinhosuchus Simosuchus Stratiotosuchus Uberabasuchus
†Brasileosaurus; 1. †Brasileosaurus pachecoi	~72–68 Ma	Adamantina Formation, Brazil	A genus of possible notosuchid notosuchian.	Adamantinasuchus Allodaposuchus precedens Armadillosuchus Araripesuchus wegeneri Brachychampsa Baurusuchus salgadoensis Chenanisuchus Itasuchus Mahajangasuchus Mariliasuchus Montealtosuchus Morrinhosuchus Simosuchus Stratiotosuchus Uberabasuchus
†Campinasuchus; 1. †Campinasuchus dinizi	~72–68 Ma	Adamantina Formation, Brazil	A baurusuchid.	Adamantinasuchus Allodaposuchus precedens Armadillosuchus Araripesuchus wegeneri Brachychampsa Baurusuchus salgadoensis Chenanisuchus Itasuchus Mahajangasuchus Mariliasuchus Montealtosuchus Morrinhosuchus Simosuchus Stratiotosuchus Uberabasuchus
†Caipirasuchus; 1. †Caipirasuchus paulistanus	72.1–68 Ma	Adamantina Formation, São Paulo, Brazil	A sphagesaurid.	Adamantinasuchus Allodaposuchus precedens Armadillosuchus Araripesuchus wegeneri Brachychampsa Baurusuchus salgadoensis Chenanisuchus Itasuchus Mahajangasuchus Mariliasuchus Montealtosuchus Morrinhosuchus Simosuchus Stratiotosuchus Uberabasuchus
†Caryonosuchus; 1. †Caryonosuchus pricei	72.1–68 Ma	Adamantina Formation, São Paulo, Brazil	A sphagesaurid characterized by a unique combination of characters, including three autapomorphies such as a rostrum with horn-like tubercles on the maxilla and on the premaxilla. Caryonosuchus also has autapomorphic rough ornamentation with grooves and bony ridges on its rostrum.	Adamantinasuchus Allodaposuchus precedens Armadillosuchus Araripesuchus wegeneri Brachychampsa Baurusuchus salgadoensis Chenanisuchus Itasuchus Mahajangasuchus Mariliasuchus Montealtosuchus Morrinhosuchus Simosuchus Stratiotosuchus Uberabasuchus
†Chenanisuchus; 1. †Chenanisuchus lateroculi	Maastrichtian to Danian	Mali Morocco	A dyrosaurid with the shortest snout relative to the dorsal skull length among all dyrosaurids.	Adamantinasuchus Allodaposuchus precedens Armadillosuchus Araripesuchus wegeneri Brachychampsa Baurusuchus salgadoensis Chenanisuchus Itasuchus Mahajangasuchus Mariliasuchus Montealtosuchus Morrinhosuchus Simosuchus Stratiotosuchus Uberabasuchus
†Eothoracosaurus; 1. †Eothoracosaurus mississippiensis	Late Cretaceous to early Paleocene	Ripley Formation, Mississippi	This genus is usually regarded as a gavialoid, one of the earliest and most basal known, though a recent study indicates that it was more likely to be a non-crocodilian eusuchian. It survived into the Paleocene.	Adamantinasuchus Allodaposuchus precedens Armadillosuchus Araripesuchus wegeneri Brachychampsa Baurusuchus salgadoensis Chenanisuchus Itasuchus Mahajangasuchus Mariliasuchus Montealtosuchus Morrinhosuchus Simosuchus Stratiotosuchus Uberabasuchus
†Itasuchus; 1. †Itasuchus jesuinoi	70.6–66 Ma	Marilia Formation, Minas Gerais, Brazil	A trematochampsid known from a 370 mm skull, suggesting a total body length of about 3 m (9.8 ft).	Adamantinasuchus Allodaposuchus precedens Armadillosuchus Araripesuchus wegeneri Brachychampsa Baurusuchus salgadoensis Chenanisuchus Itasuchus Mahajangasuchus Mariliasuchus Montealtosuchus Morrinhosuchus Simosuchus Stratiotosuchus Uberabasuchus
†Labidiosuchus; 1. †Labidiosuchus amicum	70-66 Ma	Marilia Formation, Minas Gerais, Brazil	A notosuchian.	Adamantinasuchus Allodaposuchus precedens Armadillosuchus Araripesuchus wegeneri Brachychampsa Baurusuchus salgadoensis Chenanisuchus Itasuchus Mahajangasuchus Mariliasuchus Montealtosuchus Morrinhosuchus Simosuchus Stratiotosuchus Uberabasuchus
†Mahajangasuchus; 1. †Mahajangasuchus insignis	70–65 Ma	Maevarano Formation, Mahajanga Province, Madagascar	A mahajangasuchid that was a fairly large predator, measuring up to 3 m (9.8 ft) with a weight up to 360 kg (790 lb).	Adamantinasuchus Allodaposuchus precedens Armadillosuchus Araripesuchus wegeneri Brachychampsa Baurusuchus salgadoensis Chenanisuchus Itasuchus Mahajangasuchus Mariliasuchus Montealtosuchus Morrinhosuchus Simosuchus Stratiotosuchus Uberabasuchus
†Mariliasuchus; 1. †Mariliasuchus amarali 2. †Mariliasuchus robustus	84.9–66 Ma, Santonian to Maastrichtian	Adamantina Formation, São Paulo, Brazil	A notosuchian that may have had a pig-like diet and was almost certainly warm blooded.	Adamantinasuchus Allodaposuchus precedens Armadillosuchus Araripesuchus wegeneri Brachychampsa Baurusuchus salgadoensis Chenanisuchus Itasuchus Mahajangasuchus Mariliasuchus Montealtosuchus Morrinhosuchus Simosuchus Stratiotosuchus Uberabasuchus
†Miadanasuchus; 1. †Miadanasuchus oblita	74–70 Ma, Campanian to Maastrichtian	Maevarano Formation, Mahajanga Province, Madagascar	A trematochampsid known from only a few remains.	Adamantinasuchus Allodaposuchus precedens Armadillosuchus Araripesuchus wegeneri Brachychampsa Baurusuchus salgadoensis Chenanisuchus Itasuchus Mahajangasuchus Mariliasuchus Montealtosuchus Morrinhosuchus Simosuchus Stratiotosuchus Uberabasuchus
†Montealtosuchus; 1. †Montealtosuchus arrudacamposi	~72–68 Ma	Adamantina Formation, Brazil	A peirosaurid.	Adamantinasuchus Allodaposuchus precedens Armadillosuchus Araripesuchus wegeneri Brachychampsa Baurusuchus salgadoensis Chenanisuchus Itasuchus Mahajangasuchus Mariliasuchus Montealtosuchus Morrinhosuchus Simosuchus Stratiotosuchus Uberabasuchus
†Morrinhosuchus; 1. †Morrinhosuchus luziae	84.9–66 Ma, Santonian to Maastrichtian	Adamantina Formation, São Paulo, Brazil	A notosuchian.	Adamantinasuchus Allodaposuchus precedens Armadillosuchus Araripesuchus wegeneri Brachychampsa Baurusuchus salgadoensis Chenanisuchus Itasuchus Mahajangasuchus Mariliasuchus Montealtosuchus Morrinhosuchus Simosuchus Stratiotosuchus Uberabasuchus
†Ocepesuchus; 1. †Ocepesuchus eoafricanus	70.6 to 66.043 Ma	Oulad Abdoun Basin, Khouribga Province, Morocco	A gavialoid a long snout with a tubular shape, wider than high. It is the oldest-known true crocodilian from Africa.	Adamantinasuchus Allodaposuchus precedens Armadillosuchus Araripesuchus wegeneri Brachychampsa Baurusuchus salgadoensis Chenanisuchus Itasuchus Mahajangasuchus Mariliasuchus Montealtosuchus Morrinhosuchus Simosuchus Stratiotosuchus Uberabasuchus
†Pabwehshi; 1. †Pabwehshi pakistanensis	66 Ma	Pab Formation, Balochistan, Pakistan	A baurusuchid notosuchian.	Adamantinasuchus Allodaposuchus precedens Armadillosuchus Araripesuchus wegeneri Brachychampsa Baurusuchus salgadoensis Chenanisuchus Itasuchus Mahajangasuchus Mariliasuchus Montealtosuchus Morrinhosuchus Simosuchus Stratiotosuchus Uberabasuchus
†Peirosaurus; 1. †Peirosaurus torminni	68–66 Ma	Marilia Formation, Minas Gerais, Brazil	A peirosaurid with a ziphodont dentition that is somewhat heterodont, with conical premaxillary teeth and serrated maxillary and posterior mandibular teeth. The rostrum is laterally compressed with a grove between the maxilla and premaxilla to accommodate for an enlarged mandibular tooth. A maxillary wedge-like anterior process is also present. The external nares face slightly forward and anteriorly protrude. The dorsal osteoderms are thin and sculptured with low longitudinal keels while the abdominal ones are smaller and lack keels.	Adamantinasuchus Allodaposuchus precedens Armadillosuchus Araripesuchus wegeneri Brachychampsa Baurusuchus salgadoensis Chenanisuchus Itasuchus Mahajangasuchus Mariliasuchus Montealtosuchus Morrinhosuchus Simosuchus Stratiotosuchus Uberabasuchus
†Pepesuchus; 1. †Pepesuchus deiseae	84.9–66 Ma	Presidente Prudente Formation, São Paulo, Brazil	A peirosaurid.	Adamantinasuchus Allodaposuchus precedens Armadillosuchus Araripesuchus wegeneri Brachychampsa Baurusuchus salgadoensis Chenanisuchus Itasuchus Mahajangasuchus Mariliasuchus Montealtosuchus Morrinhosuchus Simosuchus Stratiotosuchus Uberabasuchus
†Pissarrachampsa; 1. †Pissarrachampsa sera	Campanian to Maastrichtian	Vale do Rio do Peixe Formation, São Paulo, Brazil	A baurusuchid.	Adamantinasuchus Allodaposuchus precedens Armadillosuchus Araripesuchus wegeneri Brachychampsa Baurusuchus salgadoensis Chenanisuchus Itasuchus Mahajangasuchus Mariliasuchus Montealtosuchus Morrinhosuchus Simosuchus Stratiotosuchus Uberabasuchus
†Rhabdognathus; 1. †Rhabdognathus aslerensis 2. †Rhabdognathus keiniensis	66.043 to 61.7 Ma	Nigeria Mali	A dyrosaurid with an extremely elongated snout that makes up around 75% of the length of the entire skull.	Adamantinasuchus Allodaposuchus precedens Armadillosuchus Araripesuchus wegeneri Brachychampsa Baurusuchus salgadoensis Chenanisuchus Itasuchus Mahajangasuchus Mariliasuchus Montealtosuchus Morrinhosuchus Simosuchus Stratiotosuchus Uberabasuchus
†Roxochampsa; 1. †Roxochampsa paulistanus	72–68 Ma	Adamantina Formation, São Paulo, Brazil	A member of itasuchidae, previously known as "Goniopholis" paulistanus. Known from teeth, splenials and dentaries.	Adamantinasuchus Allodaposuchus precedens Armadillosuchus Araripesuchus wegeneri Brachychampsa Baurusuchus salgadoensis Chenanisuchus Itasuchus Mahajangasuchus Mariliasuchus Montealtosuchus Morrinhosuchus Simosuchus Stratiotosuchus Uberabasuchus
†Sabresuchus; 1. †Sabresuchus sympiestodon	130.0 to 66.043 Ma	Romania, Spain	A genus of neosuchian crocodyliform in the family Paralligatoridae.	Adamantinasuchus Allodaposuchus precedens Armadillosuchus Araripesuchus wegeneri Brachychampsa Baurusuchus salgadoensis Chenanisuchus Itasuchus Mahajangasuchus Mariliasuchus Montealtosuchus Morrinhosuchus Simosuchus Stratiotosuchus Uberabasuchus
†Simosuchus; 1. †Simosuchus clarki	70–66 Ma	Maevarano Formation, Mahajanga Province, Madagascar	A ziphosuchian notosuchian which had teeth shapes like cloves, which coupled with its short and deep snout suggest it was not a carnivore like most other crocodylomorphs. In fact, these features have led many to consider it a herbivore.	Adamantinasuchus Allodaposuchus precedens Armadillosuchus Araripesuchus wegeneri Brachychampsa Baurusuchus salgadoensis Chenanisuchus Itasuchus Mahajangasuchus Mariliasuchus Montealtosuchus Morrinhosuchus Simosuchus Stratiotosuchus Uberabasuchus
†Sphagesaurus; 1. †Sphagesaurus huenei	84–70 Ma, Santonian to Maastrichtian	Adamantina Formation, São Paulo, Brazil	A sphagesaurid.	Adamantinasuchus Allodaposuchus precedens Armadillosuchus Araripesuchus wegeneri Brachychampsa Baurusuchus salgadoensis Chenanisuchus Itasuchus Mahajangasuchus Mariliasuchus Montealtosuchus Morrinhosuchus Simosuchus Stratiotosuchus Uberabasuchus
†Stratiotosuchus; 1. †Stratiotosuchus maxhechti	72.1–68 Ma, Santonian to Maastricthian	Adamantina Formation, São Paulo, Brazil	A baurusuchid	Adamantinasuchus Allodaposuchus precedens Armadillosuchus Araripesuchus wegeneri Brachychampsa Baurusuchus salgadoensis Chenanisuchus Itasuchus Mahajangasuchus Mariliasuchus Montealtosuchus Morrinhosuchus Simosuchus Stratiotosuchus Uberabasuchus
†Thoracosaurus; 1. †Thoracosaurus borissiaki 2. †Thoracosaurus macrorhynchus 3. †Thoracosaurus neocesariensis 4. †Thoracosaurus pneumaticus	73.6–50.3 Ma, Campanian to Ypresian	Crimea Maastrichter Tuffkreide Formation, Limburg, Netherlands: France; Hornerstown Formation, New Jersey, USA; Navesink Formation, New Jersey, USA	A fairly large gavialoid that comes in a number of species, but most are dubious. A recent study suggests that it might have been a non-crocodylian eusuchian	Adamantinasuchus Allodaposuchus precedens Armadillosuchus Araripesuchus wegeneri Brachychampsa Baurusuchus salgadoensis Chenanisuchus Itasuchus Mahajangasuchus Mariliasuchus Montealtosuchus Morrinhosuchus Simosuchus Stratiotosuchus Uberabasuchus
†Uberabasuchus; 1. †Uberabasuchus terrificus	85–66 Ma, Santonian to Maastrichtian	Marilia Formation, Minas Gerais, Brazil	A peirosaurid that was about 2.5 m long and appears to have a high skull like that of the sebecosuchians, but differs from them in having teeth with circular cross-section. Thus, rather than slicing flesh and blood vessels, it is likely to have inflicted powerful crushing bites. It lived in an arid climate, indicating that it was likely a terrestrial predator.	Adamantinasuchus Allodaposuchus precedens Armadillosuchus Araripesuchus wegeneri Brachychampsa Baurusuchus salgadoensis Chenanisuchus Itasuchus Mahajangasuchus Mariliasuchus Montealtosuchus Morrinhosuchus Simosuchus Stratiotosuchus Uberabasuchus

== Ray-finned fish ==
Bony fish of the Maastrichtian
Taxa	Presence	Location	Description	Images
†Andinichthys				Xiphactinus audax
Arius				Xiphactinus audax
†Belonostomus; †Belonostomus lamarquensis; †Belonostomus longirostris	82–66 Ma, Campanian to Maastrichtian	Allen Formation, Argentina Alberta & Saskatchewan, Canada: Chile; USA		Xiphactinus audax
†Congorhynchus				Xiphactinus audax
†Coriops; †Coriops amnicolus		Hell Creek Formation, Montana, USA		Xiphactinus audax
†Eodiaphyodus				Xiphactinus audax
†Gasteroclupea				Xiphactinus audax
†Goudkoffia				Xiphactinus audax
†Hemilampronites				Xiphactinus audax
†Hoffstetterichthys				Xiphactinus audax
†Incaichthys				Xiphactinus audax
†Kankatodus				Xiphactinus audax
†Lepisosteus occidentalis		Hell Creek Formation	A species of Gar	Xiphactinus audax
†Melvius		Hell Creek Formation	A type of large fish of the order Amiiformes	Xiphactinus audax
†Natlandia				Xiphactinus audax
†Paleopsephurus		Hell Creek Formation	A type of paddlefish	Xiphactinus audax
†Xiphactinus; †Xiphactinus audax; †Xiphactinus vetus	94.3–66 Ma, Cenomanian to Maastrichtian		A voracious, predatory ichthyodectid, resembling a gargantuan, fanged tarpon.	Xiphactinus audax

== Mammals ==
Mammals of the Maastrichtian
Taxa	Presence	Location	Description	Images
†Alphadon; 1. †Alphadon marshi		Hell Creek Formation, Montana, USA New Mexico, USA: Alberta, Canada	An opossum-like metathere that fed on fruits, invertebrates and possibly smaller vertebrates.	Alphadon Catopsbaatar Cimolomys Didelphodon Purgatorius unio Vintana Zalambdalestes
†Argentodites; 1. †Argentodites coloniensis	70–66 Ma	La Colonia Formation, Chubut Province, Argentina	An allothere that is either a multituberculate or a gondwanathere.	Alphadon Catopsbaatar Cimolomys Didelphodon Purgatorius unio Vintana Zalambdalestes
†Barbatodon; 1. †Barbatodon oardaensis 2. †Barbatodon transylvanicum 3. †Barbatodon ungureanui		Sanpetru Formation, Hunedoara County, Romania	A small and very rare kogaionid.	Alphadon Catopsbaatar Cimolomys Didelphodon Purgatorius unio Vintana Zalambdalestes
†Bharattherium; 1. †Bharattherium jederi	70–66 Ma	Intertrappean Beds, Telangana, India	A sudamericid known from a total of eight isolated teeth.	Alphadon Catopsbaatar Cimolomys Didelphodon Purgatorius unio Vintana Zalambdalestes
†Buginbaatar; 1. †Buginbaatar transaltaiensis		Mongolia	A cimolomyid known from incomplete remains.	Alphadon Catopsbaatar Cimolomys Didelphodon Purgatorius unio Vintana Zalambdalestes
†Catopsbaatar; 1. †Catopsbaatar catopsaloides	83–70 Ma, Campanian to Maastrichtian	Barun Goyot Formation, Omnogovi Province, Mongolia	A djadochtatheriid that was originally regarded as a species of Djadochtatherium. One of its most characteristic features is a very deep anterior zygomatic ridge, and a small medial zygomatic ridge, the latter forming about a quarter of a circle and adhering the anterior one from behind.	Alphadon Catopsbaatar Cimolomys Didelphodon Purgatorius unio Vintana Zalambdalestes
†Cimexomys; 1. †Cimexomys minor	Maastrichtian to Danian	Hell Creek Formation, Montana, USA Denver Formation, Colorado, USA	An unspecified multituberculate known from small teeth of an eighth to a tenth of an inch in length.	Alphadon Catopsbaatar Cimolomys Didelphodon Purgatorius unio Vintana Zalambdalestes
†Cimolestes; 1. †Cimolestes incisus	75–56 Ma, Campanian to Thanetian	USA	A basal cimolestan that was once considered to be a marsupial, then a primitive placental mammal, but now is considered to be a member of the order Cimolesta (which was named after the genus), outside of placental mammals proper.	Alphadon Catopsbaatar Cimolomys Didelphodon Purgatorius unio Vintana Zalambdalestes
†Cimolomys; 1. †Cimolomys clarki 2. †Cimolomys gracilis 3. †Cimolomys trochuus	Campanian to Maastrichtian	USA Saskatchewan, Canada	A widespread cimolomyid that probably weighed about the same as a modern rat.	Alphadon Catopsbaatar Cimolomys Didelphodon Purgatorius unio Vintana Zalambdalestes
†Clemensodon; 1. †Clemensodon megaloba		Lance Formation, Wyoming, USA	A eucosmodontid strictly known from tooth remains.	Alphadon Catopsbaatar Cimolomys Didelphodon Purgatorius unio Vintana Zalambdalestes
†Deccanolestes; 1. †Deccanolestes hislopi 2. †Deccanolestes robustus		Intertrappean Beds, Andhra Pradesh, India	Previously referred to as a palaeoryctid, but recent evidence has shown that it is probably the most basal euarchontan, probably more specifically an adapisoriculid.	Alphadon Catopsbaatar Cimolomys Didelphodon Purgatorius unio Vintana Zalambdalestes
†Didelphodon; 1. †Didelphodon coyi 2. †Didelphodon padanicus 3. †Didelphodon vorax	73–66 Ma, Campanian to Maastrichtian	Hell Creek Formation, Montana, USA Lance Formation, Wyoming, UA: Scollard Formation, Alberta, Canada	A stagodont metathere that was one of the largest Mesozoic mammals.	Alphadon Catopsbaatar Cimolomys Didelphodon Purgatorius unio Vintana Zalambdalestes
†Djadochtatherium; 1. †Djadochtatherium matthewi	84–70 Ma, Santonian to Maastrichtian	Djadochta Formation, Omnogovi Province, Mongolia	A djadochtatheriid that was a relatively large multituberculate. It was originally diagnosed as an Asian species of Catopsalis.	Alphadon Catopsbaatar Cimolomys Didelphodon Purgatorius unio Vintana Zalambdalestes
†Essonodon; 1. †Essonodon browni		Hell Creek Formation, Montana, USA Frenchman Formation, Saskatchewan, Canada: Wyoming, USA; New Mexico, USA		Alphadon Catopsbaatar Cimolomys Didelphodon Purgatorius unio Vintana Zalambdalestes
†Ferugliotherium; 1. †Ferugliotherium windhauseni	70 Ma	Los Alamitos Formation, Rio Negro Province, Argentina	A ferugliotheriid with long upper and lower incisors that are rodent-like.	Alphadon Catopsbaatar Cimolomys Didelphodon Purgatorius unio Vintana Zalambdalestes
†Gondwanatherium; 1. †Gondwanatherium patagonicum	84.9–66 Ma, Santonian to Maastrichtian	Los Alamitos Formation, Rio Negro Province, Argentina	A sudamericid that, even though it lived earlier than Sudamerica, is considered more anatomically advanced. Thus, an ancestral lineage outlived their later, more specialized descendants.	Alphadon Catopsbaatar Cimolomys Didelphodon Purgatorius unio Vintana Zalambdalestes
†Gypsonictops; 1. †Gypsonictops hypoconus	70–65 Ma	Canada USA		Alphadon Catopsbaatar Cimolomys Didelphodon Purgatorius unio Vintana Zalambdalestes
†Indotriconodon: 1. †Indotriconodon magnus		Intertrappean Beds, Andhra Pradesh, India	The youngest eutriconodont known, as well as one of the largest Mesozoic mammals.	Alphadon Catopsbaatar Cimolomys Didelphodon Purgatorius unio Vintana Zalambdalestes
†Kharmerungulatum; 1. †Kharmerungulatum vanvaleni		Intertrappean Beds, Andhra Pradesh, India	Originally interpreted as one of the earliest-known "condylarths", now possibly a zhelestid.	Alphadon Catopsbaatar Cimolomys Didelphodon Purgatorius unio Vintana Zalambdalestes
†Kimbetohia; 1. †Kimbetohia campi	66–63 Ma, Maastrichtian to Danian	Nacimiento Formation, New Mexico, USA	A ptilodontid that was briefly mistaken for Clemensodon.	Alphadon Catopsbaatar Cimolomys Didelphodon Purgatorius unio Vintana Zalambdalestes
†Kogaionon; 1. †Kogaionon ungureanui		Sanpetru Formation, Hunedoara County, Romania	An insectivorous kogaionid, based on a well-preserved skull.	Alphadon Catopsbaatar Cimolomys Didelphodon Purgatorius unio Vintana Zalambdalestes
†Kryptobaatar; 1. †Kryptobaatar gobiensis 2. †Kryptobaatar saichanensis	70.6 Ma	Djadochta Formation, Omnogovi Province, Mongolia	A djadochtatheriid with a skull length of perhaps 3 centimeters.	Alphadon Catopsbaatar Cimolomys Didelphodon Purgatorius unio Vintana Zalambdalestes
†Lavanify; 1. †Lavanify miolaka	71–65 Ma	Maevarano Formation, Mahajanga Province, Madagascar	A sudamericid with high-crowned, curved teeth and probably ate hard plant material.	Alphadon Catopsbaatar Cimolomys Didelphodon Purgatorius unio Vintana Zalambdalestes
†Nanocuris; 1. †Nanocuris improvida		Saskatchewan, Canada Wyoming, USA	One of the largest deltatheroidan carnivores.	Alphadon Catopsbaatar Cimolomys Didelphodon Purgatorius unio Vintana Zalambdalestes
†Orretherium; 1. †Orretherium tzen		Dorotea Formation	Large mesungulatid meridiolestidan	Alphadon Catopsbaatar Cimolomys Didelphodon Purgatorius unio Vintana Zalambdalestes
†Patagomaia; 1. †Patagomaia chainko		Dorotea Formation	Unspecified therian mammal, the largest Mesozoic mammal of all time	Alphadon Catopsbaatar Cimolomys Didelphodon Purgatorius unio Vintana Zalambdalestes
†Patagorhynchus; 1. †Patagorhynchus pascuali		Dorotea Formation	Platypus-like monotreme, earliest to occur in South America.	Alphadon Catopsbaatar Cimolomys Didelphodon Purgatorius unio Vintana Zalambdalestes
†Paracimexomys; 1. †Paracimexomys priscus		Hell Creek Formation, Montana, USA	An unspecified multituberculate closely related to Cimexomys.	Alphadon Catopsbaatar Cimolomys Didelphodon Purgatorius unio Vintana Zalambdalestes
†Purgatorius; 1. †Purgatorius janisae 2. †Purgatorius titusi 3. †Purgatorius unio	66–63 Ma, Maastrichtian to Danian	Hell Creek Formation, Montana, USA Tullock Formation, Montana, USA	A non-placental eutherian.	Alphadon Catopsbaatar Cimolomys Didelphodon Purgatorius unio Vintana Zalambdalestes
†Reigitherium; 1. †Reigitherium bunodontum	70–66 Ma	Los Alamitos Formation, Rio Negro Province, Argentina La Colonia Formation, Chubut Province, Argentina	At first mistaken for either a dryolestid or a docodont, now known to be a meridiolestid dryolestoid.	Alphadon Catopsbaatar Cimolomys Didelphodon Purgatorius unio Vintana Zalambdalestes
†Sahnitherium; 1. †Sahnitherium rangapurensis		Intertrappean Beds, Andhra Pradesh, India		Alphadon Catopsbaatar Cimolomys Didelphodon Purgatorius unio Vintana Zalambdalestes
†Stygimys; 1. †Stygimys kuszmauli		Hell Creek Formation, Montana, USA		Alphadon Catopsbaatar Cimolomys Didelphodon Purgatorius unio Vintana Zalambdalestes
†Trapalcotherium; 1. †Trapalcotherium matuastensis		Allen Formation, Rio Negro Province, Argentina	A ferugliotheriid known from one tooth, a first lower molar.	Alphadon Catopsbaatar Cimolomys Didelphodon Purgatorius unio Vintana Zalambdalestes
†Vintana; 1. †Vintana sertichi	65 Ma	Madagascar	A caviomorph-like sudamericid with supersensory capabilities.	Alphadon Catopsbaatar Cimolomys Didelphodon Purgatorius unio Vintana Zalambdalestes
†Zalambdalestes; 1. †Zalambdalestes lechei	84–70.6 Ma, Santonian to Maastrichtian	Djadochta Formation, Omnogovi Province, Mongolia	A hopping, insectivorous eutherian.	Alphadon Catopsbaatar Cimolomys Didelphodon Purgatorius unio Vintana Zalambdalestes

== †Plesiosaurs ==
†Plesiosaurs of the Maastrichtian
Taxa	Presence	Location	Description	Images
†Albertonectes; †Albertonectes vanderveldei	83–70.6 Ma, Campanian to Maastrichtian	Alberta, Canada		Albertonectes Aristonectes quiriquinensis Hydrotherosaurus Kaiwhekea Mauisaurus Trinacromerum bentonianum
†Aphrosaurus; †Aphrosaurus furlongi	70–66 Ma	California, USA	An elasmosaur named after University of California Berkeley field assistant and specimen preparator Eustace Furlong.	Albertonectes Aristonectes quiriquinensis Hydrotherosaurus Kaiwhekea Mauisaurus Trinacromerum bentonianum
†Aristonectes; †Aristonectes parvidens; †Aristonectes quiriquiensis	70–66 Ma	Quiriquina Formation, Quiriquina Island, Chile Antarctica	An aristonectine elasmosaur that has been classified variously since the 1941 description of it. It is now known to be an elasmosaurid.	Albertonectes Aristonectes quiriquinensis Hydrotherosaurus Kaiwhekea Mauisaurus Trinacromerum bentonianum
†Cardiocorax; †Cardiocorax mukulu		Mocuio Formation, Angola		Albertonectes Aristonectes quiriquinensis Hydrotherosaurus Kaiwhekea Mauisaurus Trinacromerum bentonianum
†Dolichorhynchops; †Dolichorhynchops herschelensis	93.5–66 Ma, Campanian to Maastrichtian	Bearpaw Formation, Saskatchewan, Canada	A short-necked plesiosaur from the Late Cretaceous. The only known specimens were found in Herschel, Saskatchewan at the Ancient Echoes Interpretive Centre.	Albertonectes Aristonectes quiriquinensis Hydrotherosaurus Kaiwhekea Mauisaurus Trinacromerum bentonianum
†Fresnosaurus; †Fresnosaurus drescheri	70.6–66 Ma	California, USA	An elasmosaur named in honor of Fresno County and Arthur Drescher.	Albertonectes Aristonectes quiriquinensis Hydrotherosaurus Kaiwhekea Mauisaurus Trinacromerum bentonianum
†Hydrotherosaurus; †Hydrotherosaurus alexandrae		California, USA	An elasmosaur named for its discoverer, Annie Montague Alexander by Samuel Paul Welles.	Albertonectes Aristonectes quiriquinensis Hydrotherosaurus Kaiwhekea Mauisaurus Trinacromerum bentonianum
†Kaiwhekea; †Kaiwhekea katiki	70–69 Ma	Katiki Formation, Otago, South Island, New Zealand	A leptocleidid known from a single, nearly complete specimen.	Albertonectes Aristonectes quiriquinensis Hydrotherosaurus Kaiwhekea Mauisaurus Trinacromerum bentonianum
†Leurospondylus; †Leurospondylus ultimus		Horseshoe Canyon Formation, Alberta, Canada	A little-known plesiosaur, probably either an elasmosaur or a late-surviving plesiosaurid. Offspring most likely spent their early lives in brackish rivers and estuaries.	Albertonectes Aristonectes quiriquinensis Hydrotherosaurus Kaiwhekea Mauisaurus Trinacromerum bentonianum
†Mauisaurus; †Mauisaurus haasti	80–69 Ma, Campanian to Maastrichtian	Conway Formation, Canterbury, South Island, New Zealand	An elasmosaur that was the largest plesiosaur and, perhaps, the largest marine reptile in New Zealand waters at the time.	Albertonectes Aristonectes quiriquinensis Hydrotherosaurus Kaiwhekea Mauisaurus Trinacromerum bentonianum
†Trinacromerum; †Trinacromerum kirki	93–70 Ma, Turonian to Maastrichtian	Manitoba, Canada		Albertonectes Aristonectes quiriquinensis Hydrotherosaurus Kaiwhekea Mauisaurus Trinacromerum bentonianum
†Tuarangisaurus; †Trinacromerum kirki	72-68 MA	Tahora Formation, New Zealand		Albertonectes Aristonectes quiriquinensis Hydrotherosaurus Kaiwhekea Mauisaurus Trinacromerum bentonianum
†Zarafasaura; †Zarafasaura oceanis		Ouled Abdoun Basin, Khouribga Province, Morocco		Albertonectes Aristonectes quiriquinensis Hydrotherosaurus Kaiwhekea Mauisaurus Trinacromerum bentonianum

== †Pterosaurs ==
†Pterosaurs of the Maastrichtian
Taxa	Presence	Location	Description	Images
†Aerotitan; 1. †Aerotitan sudamericanus	70 Ma, Maastrichtian	Allen Formation, Argentina	Known to be the first unambiguous azhdarchid from South America. The wingspan has been estimated as at least 5 m (16 ft).	Aerotitan Arambourgiania Eurazhdarcho Hatzegopteryx Phosphatodraco Quetzalcoatlus
†Alcione; 1. †Alcione elainus	66 Ma	Oulad Abdoun Basin, Khouribga Province, Morocco	A tiny Nyctosaurid from Africa.	Aerotitan Arambourgiania Eurazhdarcho Hatzegopteryx Phosphatodraco Quetzalcoatlus
†Arambourgiania; 1. †Arambourgiania philadelphiae	70.6–66 Ma	Zarqa Governorate, Jordan	An azhdarchid known only from fragmentary remains, this pterosaur had a very complicated past. The neck vertebrae that the species is known from were highly elongated, more so than the vertebrae of Quetzalcoatlus; indicating that this creature was indeed quite large.	Aerotitan Arambourgiania Eurazhdarcho Hatzegopteryx Phosphatodraco Quetzalcoatlus
†Barbaridactylus; 1. †Barbaridactylus grandis	66 Ma	Oulad Abdoun Basin, Khouribga Province, Morocco	A relatively large animal for a Nyctosaurid native to Africa.	Aerotitan Arambourgiania Eurazhdarcho Hatzegopteryx Phosphatodraco Quetzalcoatlus
†Eurazhdarcho; 1. †Eurazhdarcho langendorfensis	69 Ma	Sebes Formation, Alba County, Romania	A medium-sized azhdarchid (having an estimated wingspan of 3 meters) with some distinctive traits, all present in the cervical vertebrae.	Aerotitan Arambourgiania Eurazhdarcho Hatzegopteryx Phosphatodraco Quetzalcoatlus
†Hatzegopteryx; 1. †Hatzegopteryx thambema	66 Ma	Densus-Ciula Formation, Hunedoara County, Romania	An azhdarchid known from incomplete remains. The skull fragments, left humerus, and other fossilized remains indicate it was among the largest pterosaurs, very similar (almost identical) to Quetzalcoatlus. The authors estimated the size of Hatzegopteryx by comparing the humerus fragment, 236 mm (9.3 in) long, with that of Quetzalcoatlus, of which one specimen has a 544 mm (1 ft 9.4 in) long humerus. Observing that the Hatzegopteryx fragment presented less than half of the original bone, they established that it could possibly have been "slightly longer" than that of Quetzalcoatlus. They noted that the wing span of the latter had in 1981 been estimated at 11 to 12 meters (36 to 39 ft), while earlier estimates had strongly exceeded this at 15 to 20 meters (49 to 66 ft). From this they concluded that an estimate of a 12 m (39 ft) wingspan for Hatzegopteryx was conservative if its humerus was indeed somewhat longer than that of Quetzalcoatlus. In 2003 they moderated the estimates to a close to 12 m (39 ft) wing span and an over 2.5 meters (8 feet 2 inches) skull length. In 2010 Mark Witton e.a. stated that any appearance that the Hatzegopteryx humerus was bigger than TMM 41450–3 had been caused by a distortion of the bone after deposition and that the species thus likely had no larger wingspan than Quetzalcoatlus, today generally estimated at 10 to 11 meters (33 to 36 ft).	Aerotitan Arambourgiania Eurazhdarcho Hatzegopteryx Phosphatodraco Quetzalcoatlus
†Navajodactylus; 1. †Navajodactylus boerei	75.56–74.44 Ma, Campanian to Maastrichtian	Kirtland Formation, New Mexico, USA	A pterosaur of uncertain affinities with an estimated wingspan of 3.5 m (11 ft). Its autapomorphies largely exist in the unique form of the process on the first wing phalanx for the extensor tendon.	Aerotitan Arambourgiania Eurazhdarcho Hatzegopteryx Phosphatodraco Quetzalcoatlus
†Phosphatodraco; 1. †P. mauritanicus	66 Ma	Oulad Abdoun Basin, Khouribga Province, Morocco	The first azhdarchid found in North Africa, as well as being unusual among azhdarchids for having elongate vertebrae at the base of the neck (also with neural spines), interpreted as modified dorsal vertebrae; the neck is also one of the most complete known for azhdarchids. The cervical vertebrae are thought to be a series from the fifth (the longest with a length of thirty centimeters) to the ninth. The individual to which the neck belonged would have had a wingspan of about 5 m (16 ft).	Aerotitan Arambourgiania Eurazhdarcho Hatzegopteryx Phosphatodraco Quetzalcoatlus
†Quetzalcoatlus; 1. †Quetzalcoatlus northropi	68–66 Ma	Hell Creek Formation, Montana, USA Javelina Formation, Texas, USA	An azhdarchid named after the Mesoamerican Aztec feathered serpent god Quetzalcoatl. Alongside Q. northropi, a second species exists without an official specific name yet, currently called Quetzalcoatlus sp.. One of the largest-known flying animals of all time, it had a stork-like lifestyle. When it was first discovered, scientists estimated that the largest Quetzalcoatlus fossils came from an individual with a wingspan as large as 15.9 m (52 ft), choosing the middle of three extrapolations from the proportions of other pterosaurs that gave an estimate of 11, 15.5 and 21 meters, respectively (36 feet, 50.85 feet, 68.9 feet). In 1981, further study lowered these estimates to 11–12 m (36–39 ft). More recent estimates based on greater knowledge of azhdarchid proportions place its wingspan at 10–11 meters (33–36 ft). It is known to have a scavenging lifestyle similar to a marabou stork, rather than a fishing lifestyle.	Aerotitan Arambourgiania Eurazhdarcho Hatzegopteryx Phosphatodraco Quetzalcoatlus
†Simurghia; 1. †Simurghia robusta	66 Ma	Oulad Abdoun Basin, Khouribga Province, Morocco	A Nyctosaurid native to Africa.	Aerotitan Arambourgiania Eurazhdarcho Hatzegopteryx Phosphatodraco Quetzalcoatlus
†Tethydraco; 1. †Tethydraco regalis	66 Ma	Oulad Abdoun Basin, Khouribga Province, Morocco	A late surviving Pteranodontid native to Africa.	Aerotitan Arambourgiania Eurazhdarcho Hatzegopteryx Phosphatodraco Quetzalcoatlus
*†Pterosauria indet: 1. †Pterosauria indet	70 to 66 Ma	Inter-trappean beds, India	The only late cretaceous Pterosaur native to India.	Aerotitan Arambourgiania Eurazhdarcho Hatzegopteryx Phosphatodraco Quetzalcoatlus

== Squamates ==
Squamates of the Maastrichtian
Taxa	Presence	Location	Description	Images
†Carinodens; †Carinodens belgicus		Netherlands	A mosasaurine mosasaur measuring approximately 3.5 m (11 ft) in length, making it one of the smallest-known mosasaurs.	Globidens dakotensis Goronyosaurus Hainosaurus Halisaurus Mosasaurus beaugei Plotosaurus Prognathodon saturator Sanajeh Taniwhasaurus oweni
†Cerberophis; †Cerberophis robustus		Hell Creek Formation, USA	An advanced snake of uncertain phylogenetic placement.	Globidens dakotensis Goronyosaurus Hainosaurus Halisaurus Mosasaurus beaugei Plotosaurus Prognathodon saturator Sanajeh Taniwhasaurus oweni
†Eremiasaurus; 1. †Eremiasaurus heterodontus		Morocco		Globidens dakotensis Goronyosaurus Hainosaurus Halisaurus Mosasaurus beaugei Plotosaurus Prognathodon saturator Sanajeh Taniwhasaurus oweni
†Globidens; 1. †Globidens alabamaensis 2. †Globidens dakotensis 3. †Globidens phosphaticus 4. †Globidens schurmanni 5. †Globidens timorensis 6. †Globidens simplex	84.9–70.6 Ma, Santonian to Maastrichtian	USA: East Timor; Morocco; Angola	A mosasaurine mosasaur with teeth vastly different from other mosasaurs, as they were globular, as suggested in its generic name. While many other mosasaurs were capable of crushing the shells of ammonites, none were as specialized in dealing with armored prey like Globidens. Globidens, unlike most other mosasaurs, had semispherical teeth with rounded nubbin-like points, which were much better suited for crushing tough armored prey like smaller reptiles and mollusks.	Globidens dakotensis Goronyosaurus Hainosaurus Halisaurus Mosasaurus beaugei Plotosaurus Prognathodon saturator Sanajeh Taniwhasaurus oweni
†Goronyosaurus; 1. †Goronyosaurus nigeriensis		Sokoto State, Niger Nigeria	A mosasaur with an almost crocodilian-like head and was one of the few kinds to live in freshwater. It lived in rivers and hunted both aquatic and terrestrial animals in the area.	Globidens dakotensis Goronyosaurus Hainosaurus Halisaurus Mosasaurus beaugei Plotosaurus Prognathodon saturator Sanajeh Taniwhasaurus oweni
†Hainosaurus; 1. †Hainosaurus bernardi	70.6–66 Ma	Sweden	A tylosaurine mosasaur that had more vertebrae in the neck and tail than its Tylosaurus cousin. It is one of the largest mosasaurs, though its size has been revised more than once.	Globidens dakotensis Goronyosaurus Hainosaurus Halisaurus Mosasaurus beaugei Plotosaurus Prognathodon saturator Sanajeh Taniwhasaurus oweni
†Halisaurus; 1. †Halisaurus platyspondylus		USA	With a length of 3–4 m (9.8–13.1 ft), this species of halisaurine mosasaur is small compared to most other mosasaurs.	Globidens dakotensis Goronyosaurus Hainosaurus Halisaurus Mosasaurus beaugei Plotosaurus Prognathodon saturator Sanajeh Taniwhasaurus oweni
†Igdamanosaurus; 1. †Igdamanosaurus aegyptiacus	70–65 Ma	Egypt		Globidens dakotensis Goronyosaurus Hainosaurus Halisaurus Mosasaurus beaugei Plotosaurus Prognathodon saturator Sanajeh Taniwhasaurus oweni
†Kaikaifilu; †Kaikaifilu hervei	66 MA	López de Bertodano Formation, Seymour Island, Antarctica	With a total length estimated over 10 m (33 ft) this species is among the largest members of the Tylosaurines, And the only really large antarctic tylosaurine	Globidens dakotensis Goronyosaurus Hainosaurus Halisaurus Mosasaurus beaugei Plotosaurus Prognathodon saturator Sanajeh Taniwhasaurus oweni
†Kelyophis; 1. †Kelyophis hechti	70–66 Ma	Maevarano Formation, Mahajanga Province, Madagascar		Globidens dakotensis Goronyosaurus Hainosaurus Halisaurus Mosasaurus beaugei Plotosaurus Prognathodon saturator Sanajeh Taniwhasaurus oweni
†Liodon; 1. †Liodon anceps 2. †Liodon compressidens 3. †Liodon mosasauroides 4. †Liodon sectorius	99.7–66 Ma, Cenomanian to Maastrichtian	France Netherlands: Spain		Globidens dakotensis Goronyosaurus Hainosaurus Halisaurus Mosasaurus beaugei Plotosaurus Prognathodon saturator Sanajeh Taniwhasaurus oweni
†Madtsoia; 1. †Madtsoia madagascariensis 2. †Madtsoia pisdurensis	Campanian to Maastrichtian	Madagascar India		Globidens dakotensis Goronyosaurus Hainosaurus Halisaurus Mosasaurus beaugei Plotosaurus Prognathodon saturator Sanajeh Taniwhasaurus oweni
†Menarana; 1. †Menarana nosymena	70–66 Ma	Maevarano Formation, Mahajanga Province, Madagascar	A madtsoiid snake that was probably fossorial, borrowing with its head.	Globidens dakotensis Goronyosaurus Hainosaurus Halisaurus Mosasaurus beaugei Plotosaurus Prognathodon saturator Sanajeh Taniwhasaurus oweni
†Moanasaurus; 1. †Moanasaurus mangahouangae		North Island, New Zealand	A mosasaurine mosasaur that was one of the largest of the mosasaurs.	Globidens dakotensis Goronyosaurus Hainosaurus Halisaurus Mosasaurus beaugei Plotosaurus Prognathodon saturator Sanajeh Taniwhasaurus oweni
†Mosasaurus; 1. †Mosasaurus beaugei 2. †Mosasaurus conodon 3. †Mosasaurus dekayi 4. †Mosasaurus hoffmannii 5. †Mosasaurus missouriensis 6. †Mosasaurus mokoroa	70–66 Ma	Netherlands USA: Saskatchewan, Canada; Morocco; Angola; Bulgaria; Belgium; Denmark; Italy; Poland; Turkey; Syria; Conway Formation, Canterbury, South Island, New Zealand		Globidens dakotensis Goronyosaurus Hainosaurus Halisaurus Mosasaurus beaugei Plotosaurus Prognathodon saturator Sanajeh Taniwhasaurus oweni
†Nedophis; 1. †Nedophis insularis		Romania		Globidens dakotensis Goronyosaurus Hainosaurus Halisaurus Mosasaurus beaugei Plotosaurus Prognathodon saturator Sanajeh Taniwhasaurus oweni
†Obamadon; 1. †Obamadon gracilis	66–65 Ma	Hell Creek Formation, Montana, USA Lance Formation, Wyoming, USA	A polyglyphanodontian lizard known from two lower jaw fragments, each less than a centimeter in length. It had a V-shaped connection between the two halves of the lower jaw, a slot-and-ridge type connection between the dentary bone of the lower jaw and another missing bone called the splenial bone, and teeth that are implanted within the jaw bone. Its jaw is thin and straight, unlike the curved jaws of most other polyglyphanodontians. Obamadon is estimated to have been about 30 cm (0.98 ft) in length and may have preyed on insects. It was named after United States president Barack Obama.	Globidens dakotensis Goronyosaurus Hainosaurus Halisaurus Mosasaurus beaugei Plotosaurus Prognathodon saturator Sanajeh Taniwhasaurus oweni
†Plesiotylosaurus; 1. †Plesiotylosaurus crassidens		California, USA		Globidens dakotensis Goronyosaurus Hainosaurus Halisaurus Mosasaurus beaugei Plotosaurus Prognathodon saturator Sanajeh Taniwhasaurus oweni
†Plotosaurus; 1. †Plotosaurus tuckeri		California, USA	A mosasaurine mosasaur that was probably a faster swimmer than most other mosasaurs.	Globidens dakotensis Goronyosaurus Hainosaurus Halisaurus Mosasaurus beaugei Plotosaurus Prognathodon saturator Sanajeh Taniwhasaurus oweni
†Polyglyphandon		Utah, USA		Globidens dakotensis Goronyosaurus Hainosaurus Halisaurus Mosasaurus beaugei Plotosaurus Prognathodon saturator Sanajeh Taniwhasaurus oweni
†Prognathodon; 1. †Prognathodon currii 2. †Prognathodon giganteus 3. †Prognathodon kianda 4. †Prognathodon overtoni 5. †Prognathodon rapax 6. †Prognathodon saturator 7. †Prognathodon solvayi 8. †Prognathodon waiparaensis	84.9–66 Ma, Santonian to Maastrichtian	USA Alberta, Canada: Netherlands; South Island, New Zealand; Morocco; Jordan; Angola; Spain	A mosasaurine mosasaur that had protective bony rings surrounding its eye sockets, indicating it lived in deep water. Its teeth are similar to those of some Triassic placodonts, so it may have lived a similar lifestyle, feeding on shellfish, large fish and sea turtles.	Globidens dakotensis Goronyosaurus Hainosaurus Halisaurus Mosasaurus beaugei Plotosaurus Prognathodon saturator Sanajeh Taniwhasaurus oweni
†Sanajeh; 1. †Sanajeh indicus	68 Ma	Lameta Formation, India	A madtsoiid snake that is known to eat the eggs and hatchlings of dinosaurs.	Globidens dakotensis Goronyosaurus Hainosaurus Halisaurus Mosasaurus beaugei Plotosaurus Prognathodon saturator Sanajeh Taniwhasaurus oweni
†Socognathus; 1. †Socognathus unicuspis	Campanian to Maastrichtian	Lance Formation, Wyoming, USA Alberta, Canada		Globidens dakotensis Goronyosaurus Hainosaurus Halisaurus Mosasaurus beaugei Plotosaurus Prognathodon saturator Sanajeh Taniwhasaurus oweni
†Taniwhasaurus; 1. †Taniwhasaurus antarcticus 2. †Taniwhasaurus mikasaensis 3. †Taniwhasaurus oweni	85.8–66.043 Ma, Santonian to Maastrichtian	Santa Marta Formation, James Ross Island, Antarctica Conway Formation, Canterbury, South Island, New Zealand: Japan	A widespread tylosaurine mosasaur. T. owni was the first species discovered and the two other species (T. antarcticus and T. mikasaensis) were at first assigned to two different genera: Lakumasaurus and Yezosaurus.	Globidens dakotensis Goronyosaurus Hainosaurus Halisaurus Mosasaurus beaugei Plotosaurus Prognathodon saturator Sanajeh Taniwhasaurus oweni

== Turtles ==
Testudines of the Maastrichtian
Taxa	Presence	Location	Description	Images
†Adocus; †Adocus beatus		USA		
†Alienochelys; †Alienochelys selloumi		Oulad Abdoun Basin, Khouribga Province, Morocco		
†Archelon; †Archelon ischyros	75–66 Ma, Campanian to Maastrichtian	USA		
†Cedrobaena; †Cedrobaena putorius	66–56.8 Ma, Maastrichtian to Selandian	Hell Creek Formation, Wyoming, USA		
†Compsemys; †Compsemys victa		Hell Creek Formation, Montana, USA	A dermatemydid that was a moderately-sized turtle up to 30 cm (12 in) long, with a carapace covered with raised, flattened tubercles, which are not seen in any other turtle. Similar to an alligator snapping turtle, with its sharply hooked beak; this relative of the Central American river turtle must have been a semiaquatic carnivore.	
†Dollochelys; †Dollochelys atlantica; †Dollochelys coatesi	70–65 Ma	New Jersey & Maryland, USA		
†Gamerabaena; †Gamerabaena sonsalia		Hell Creek Formation, North Dakota, USA	A baenid that was similar to Palatobaena, but it differs in its lack of a posterior expansion of the triturating (or chewing) surface, a somewhat rectangular skull, and a wide angle between the maxillae. Gamerabaena also has a lingual ridge on the inner side of the jaw that is not seen in Palatobaena. It is named after Gamera, the kaiju created by the Daiei Motion Picture Company.	
†Gigantatypus; †Gigantatypus salahi		Jordan	A cheloniid sea turtle that was one of the largest sea turtles ever.	
†Gilmoremys; †Gilmoremys lancensis		Hell Creek Formation, North Dakota, USA Lance Formation, Wyoming, USA	A softshell turtle that is known from five skulls, a mandible and an incomplete postcranial skeleton. One find consists of a nearly complete carapace and an isolated hyoplastral fragment.	
†Kurmademys; †Kurmademys kallamedensis	70.6–65 Ma	Kallamedu Formation, India		
†Ocepechelon; †Ocepechelon bouyai	67 Ma	Oulad Abdoun Basin, Khouribga Province, Morocco	A dermochelyid with a feeding apparatus unique among tetrapods and shares unique convergences with both syngnathids (unique long tubular bony snout ending in a rounded and forward directed mouth) and beaked whales (large size and elongated edentulous jaws).	
†Palatobaena; †Palatobaena bairdi; †Palatobaena cohen	70.6–65 MA	Fort Union Formation, Wyoming, USA Hell Creek Formation, North Dakota, USA		
†Patagoniaemys; †Patagoniaemys gasparinae	Campanian to Maastrichtian	La Colonia Formation, Chubut Province, Argentina	A little-known basal turtle.	
†Peckemys; †Peckemys brinkman		Hell Creek Formation, USA		
†Pneumatoarthrus; †Pneumatoarthrus peloreus		Kansas, USA	A protostegid sea turtle that was at first mistakenly believed to be a hadrosaur by Edward Drinker Cope.	
†Shweboemys; †Shweboemys pisdurensis	94–65, Cenomanian to Maastrichtian	India		

== †Choristoderes ==
Choristoderes of the Maastrichtian
Taxa	Presence	Location	Description	Images
†Champsosaurus; †Champsosaurus albertensis; †Champsosaurus annectens; †Champsosaurus laramiensis; †Champsosaurus lindoei; †Champsosaurus natator	84.9–36 Ma, Santonian to Eocene	Alberta & Saskatchewan, Canada Hell Creek Formation, Montana & Wyoming, USA	A gharial-like champsosaurid that hunted in rivers and swamps, catching fish with its long, tooth-lined jaws. The genus survived until the Ypresian.	Champsosaurus natator
†Cteniogenys; †Cteniogenys antiquus	167.7–70.6 Ma, Bathonian to Maastrichtian	USA Canada	A cteniogenid originally believed to be either a lizard or a frog. It lived from the Jurassic to the Cretaceous.	Champsosaurus natator
†Eotomistoma; †Eotomistoma multidentata	99.7–66 Ma, Cenomanian to Maastrichtian	China		Champsosaurus natator

== See also ==
- List of fossil sites (with link directory)
- Cretaceous–Paleogene extinction event
- List of vertebrate fauna of the Campanian stage
