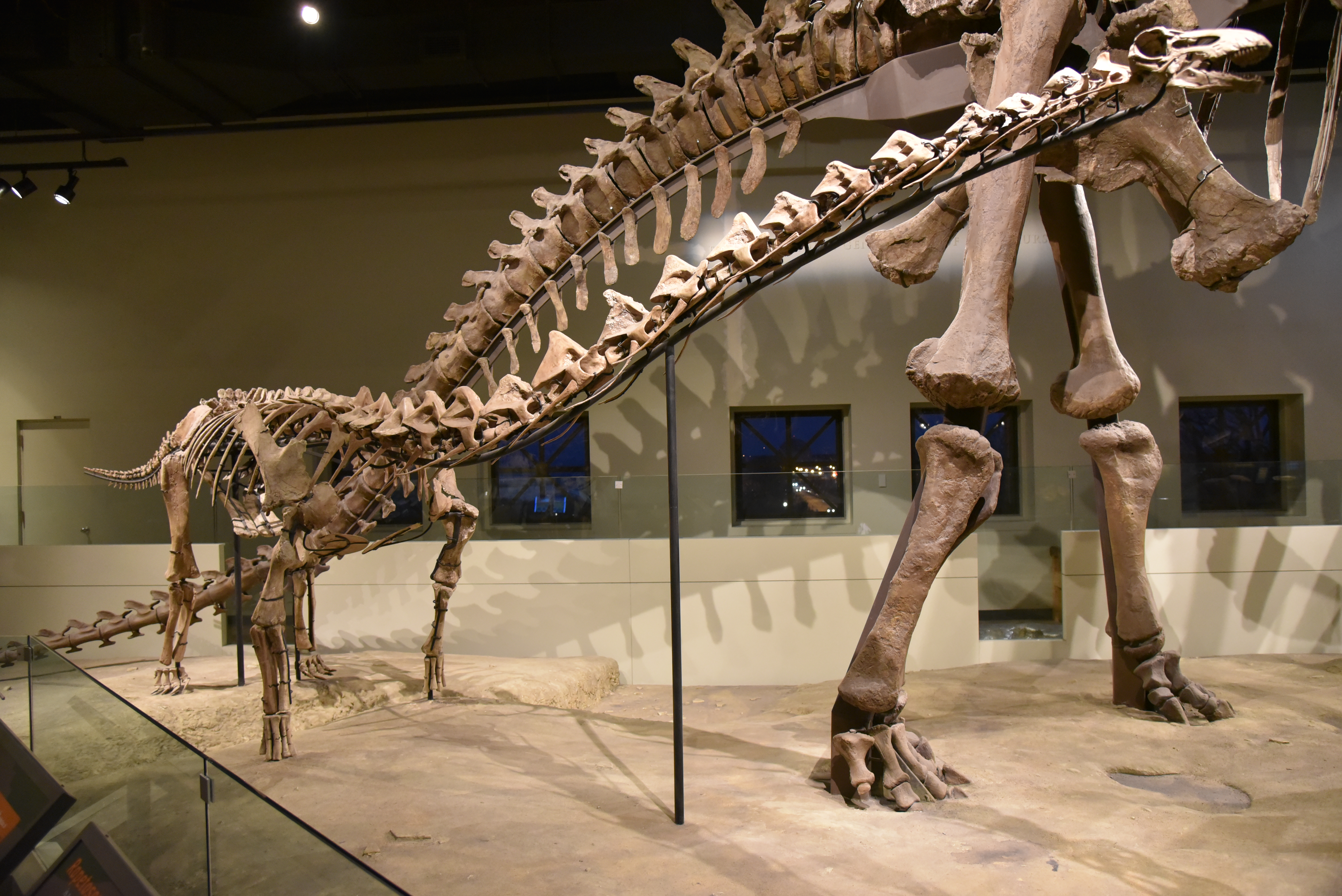
- Juvenile skeleton, Field Museum of Natural History
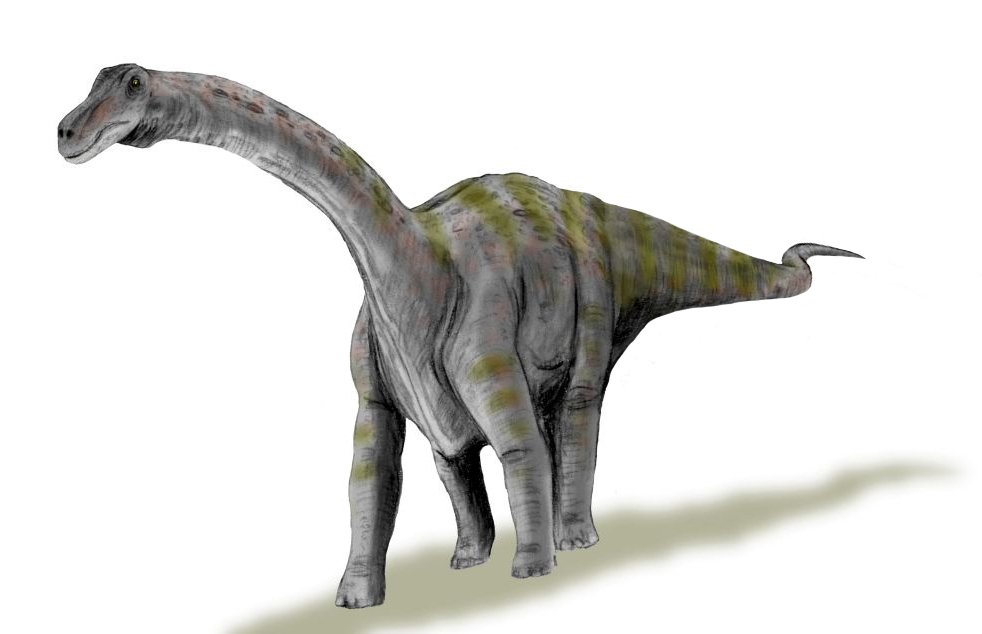
- Rapetosaurus restoration

Scientific classification
- Kingdom: Animalia
- Phylum: Chordata
- Class: Reptilia
- Clade: Dinosauria
- Clade: Saurischia
- Clade: †Sauropodomorpha
- Clade: †Sauropoda
- Clade: †Eusauropoda
- Clade: †Macronaria
- Clade: †Titanosauria
- Clade: †Lithostrotia
- Genus: †Rapetosaurus; Curry Rogers & Forster, 2001
- Species: †R. krausei

Binomial name
- †Rapetosaurus krausei Curry Rogers & Forster, 2001

= Rapetosaurus =

Rapetosaurus Temporal range: Late Cretaceous (Maastrichtian), 70–66 Ma

Extinct genus of dinosaurs

Rapetosaurus (/rəˌpeɪtuːˈsɔːrəs/ rə-PAY-too-SOR-əs) is a genus of titanosaurian sauropod dinosaur that lived in Madagascar from 70 to 66 million years ago, at the end of the Cretaceous Period. Only one species, Rapetosaurus krausei, has been identified. Like other sauropods, Rapetosaurus was a quadrupedal herbivore. It is calculated to have reached lengths of 15 m (49 ft) in adulthood.

== Description ==
Rapetosaurus was a fairly typical sauropod, with a short and slender tail, a very long neck and a huge, elephant-like body. Its head resembles the head of a diplodocid, with a long, narrow snout and nostrils on the top of its skull. It was a herbivore and its small, pencil-like teeth were good for ripping the leaves off trees but not for chewing.

Size comparison between the juvenile Rapetosaurus and a human

It was fairly modest in size for a titanosaur. The juvenile specimen measured 8 metres (26 ft) from head to tail and "probably weighed about as much as an elephant". An adult would have been about twice as long (15 metres (49 ft) in length), which is still less than half the length of its gigantic kin, like Argentinosaurus and Paralititan. In 2020, Molina-Perez and Larramendi estimated the size of the probable adult specimen (MAD 93-18), which is known from a femur, at 16.5 meters (54 ft) and 10.3 tonnes (11.35 short tons).

== Discovery and naming ==
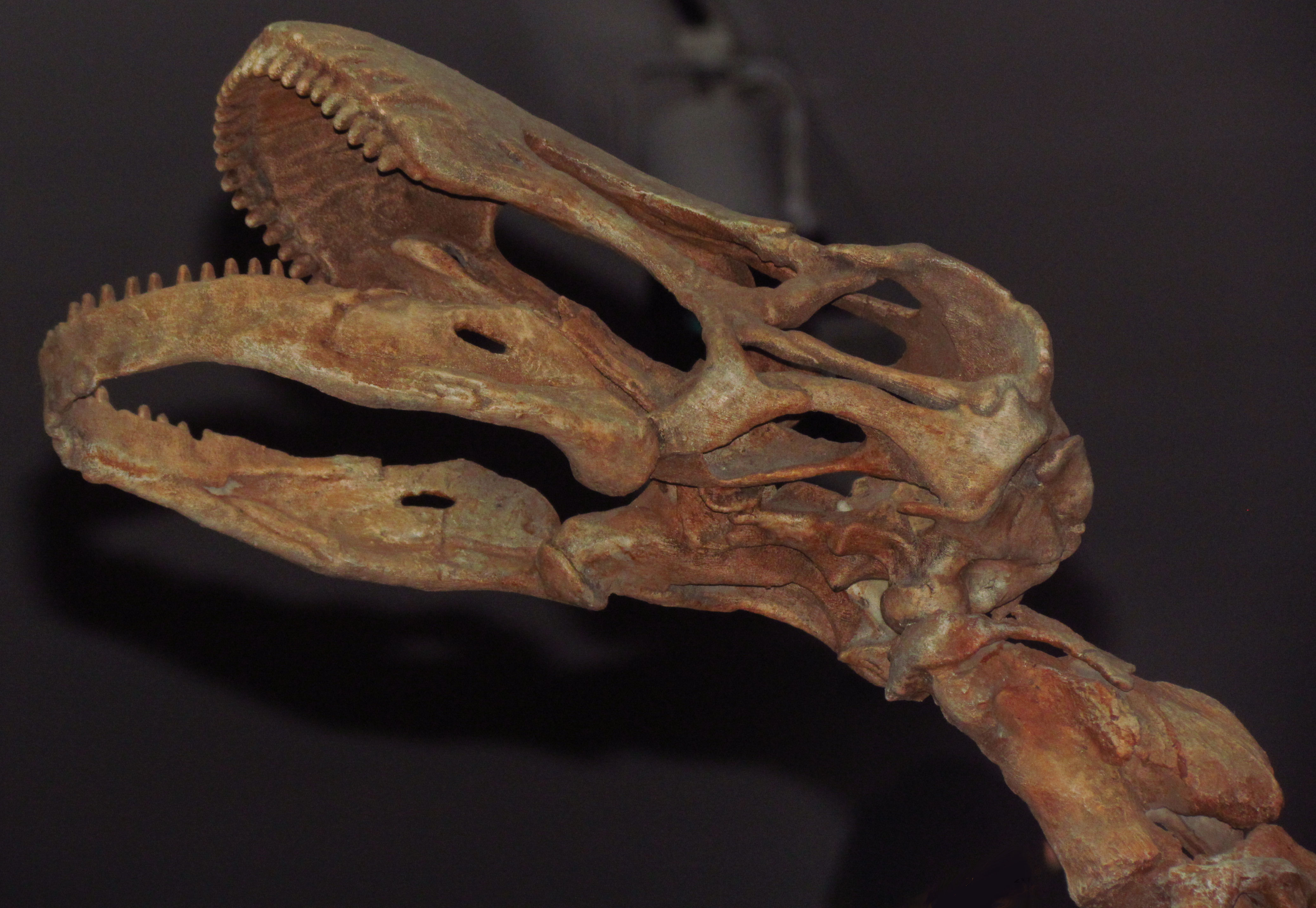
Skull cast, Royal Ontario Museum, Canada.

The discovery of Rapetosaurus, known by the single species Rapetosaurus krausei, marked the first time a titanosaur had been recovered with an almost perfectly intact skeleton, complete with skull. It has helped to clarify some difficult, century-old classification issues among this large group of sauropod dinosaurs and provides a good baseline for the reconstruction of other titanosaurs that are known only from partial fossilized remains.

The discovery was published in 2001 by Kristina Curry Rogers and Catherine A. Forster in the scientific journal Nature. The nearly-complete skeleton is that of a juvenile and partial remains from three other individuals were also recovered.

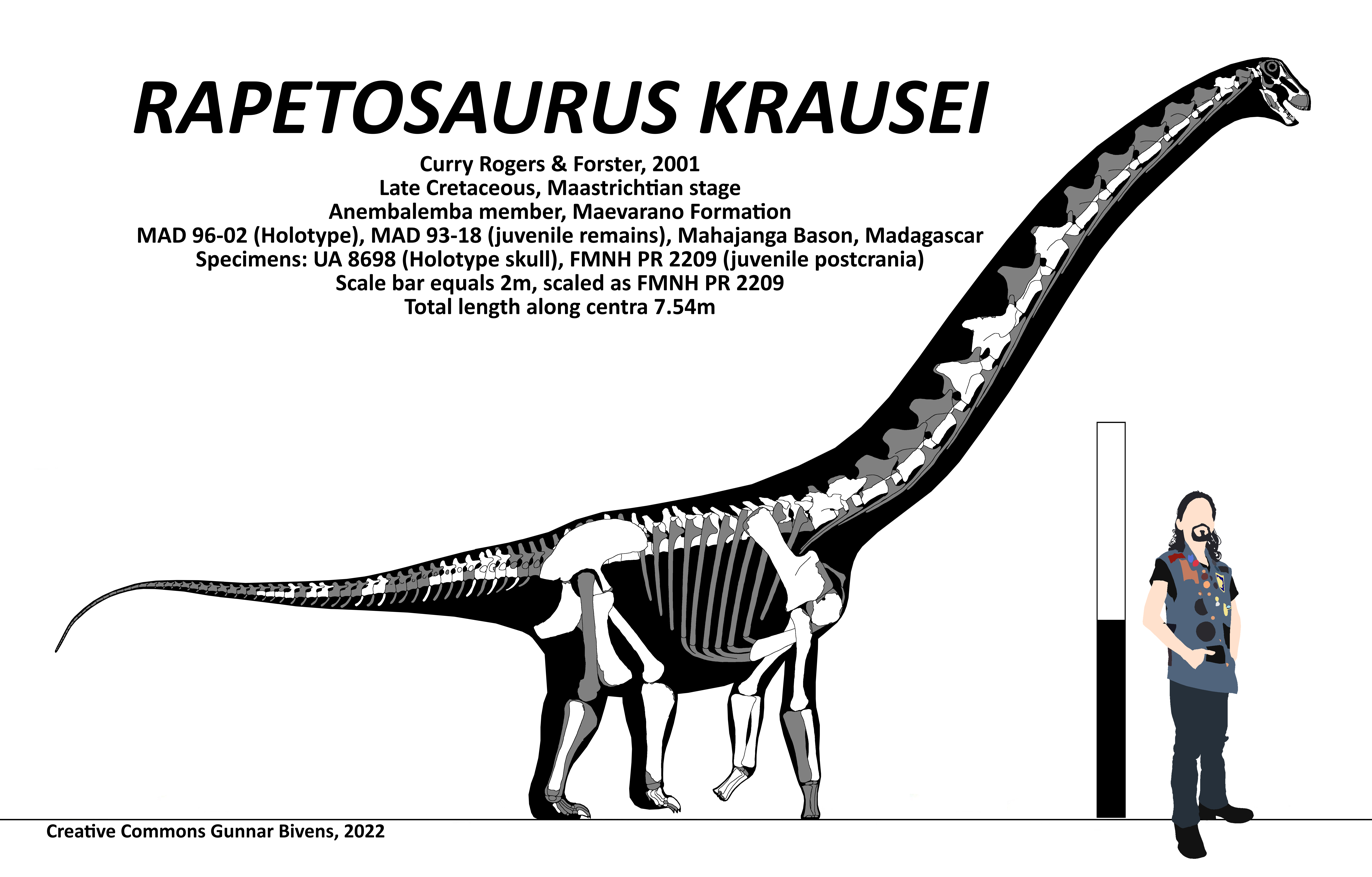
Skeletal reconstruction of R. krausei, scaled as juvenile specimen FMNH PR 2209.

The dig uncovered a partial skull (UA 8698, the holotype specimen), another partial skull, a juvenile skeleton missing only a few tail vertebrae, and an unrelated vertebra. The juvenile skeleton, in particular, is the most complete titanosaur skeleton ever recovered and the only one with a head still attached to the body.

The fossilized remains were found in the Mahajanga basin in northwest Madagascar, not far from the port city of Mahajanga. They were recovered from a layer of sandstone known as the Anembalemba Member, which is part of the Maevarano Formation. The rock formation has been dated to the Maastrichtian stage of the late Cretaceous, which means the fossilized bones are about 70 million years old. They were found by a field team from Stony Brook University with the assistance of the local Universite d'Antananarivo. The team leader, David Krause, had been excavating fossils from the site since 1993.

The generic name Rapetosaurus is derived from Rapeto (a giant deity in Malagasy folklore credited for the geographical features of the land) and sauros, which is Greek for lizard. The species epithet, krausei, is named after the team leader of the expedition, David W. Krause.

== Paleobiology ==
=== Growth ===
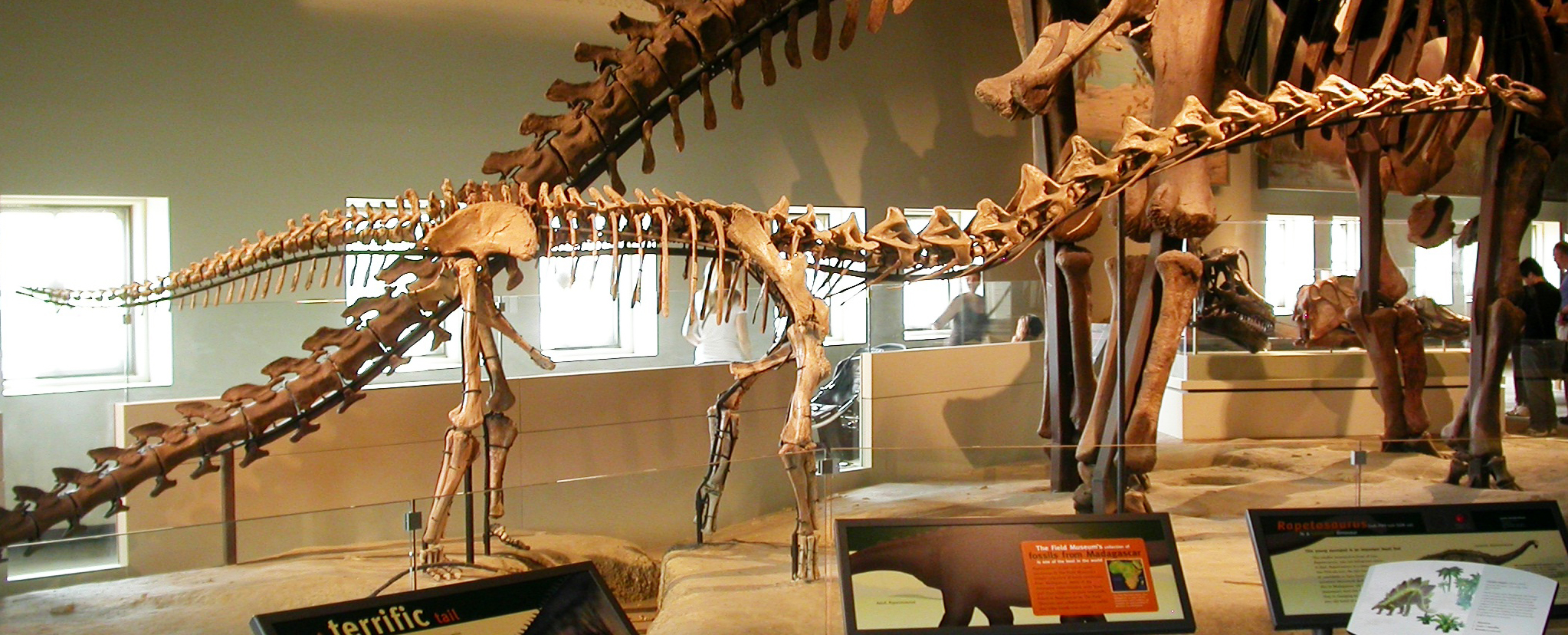
Field Museum mount in side view

A rare specimen of a juvenile Rapetosaurus was uncovered in a museum collection by Kristina Curry Rogers and colleagues. The specimen was estimated to weigh about 40 kilograms (88 pounds) and was likely between 39 and 77 days old by the time of its death. At the time of its hatching, the juvenile Rapetosaurus was estimated to be 3.4 kilograms (7.8 pounds) in weight. Based on bone remodeling, the juvenile sauropod was also believed to have been capable of surviving with little to no parental care. Analysis of the bones further revealed the young Rapetosaurus likely starved to death due to Cretaceous Madagascar's harsh droughts.

== Paleoecology ==
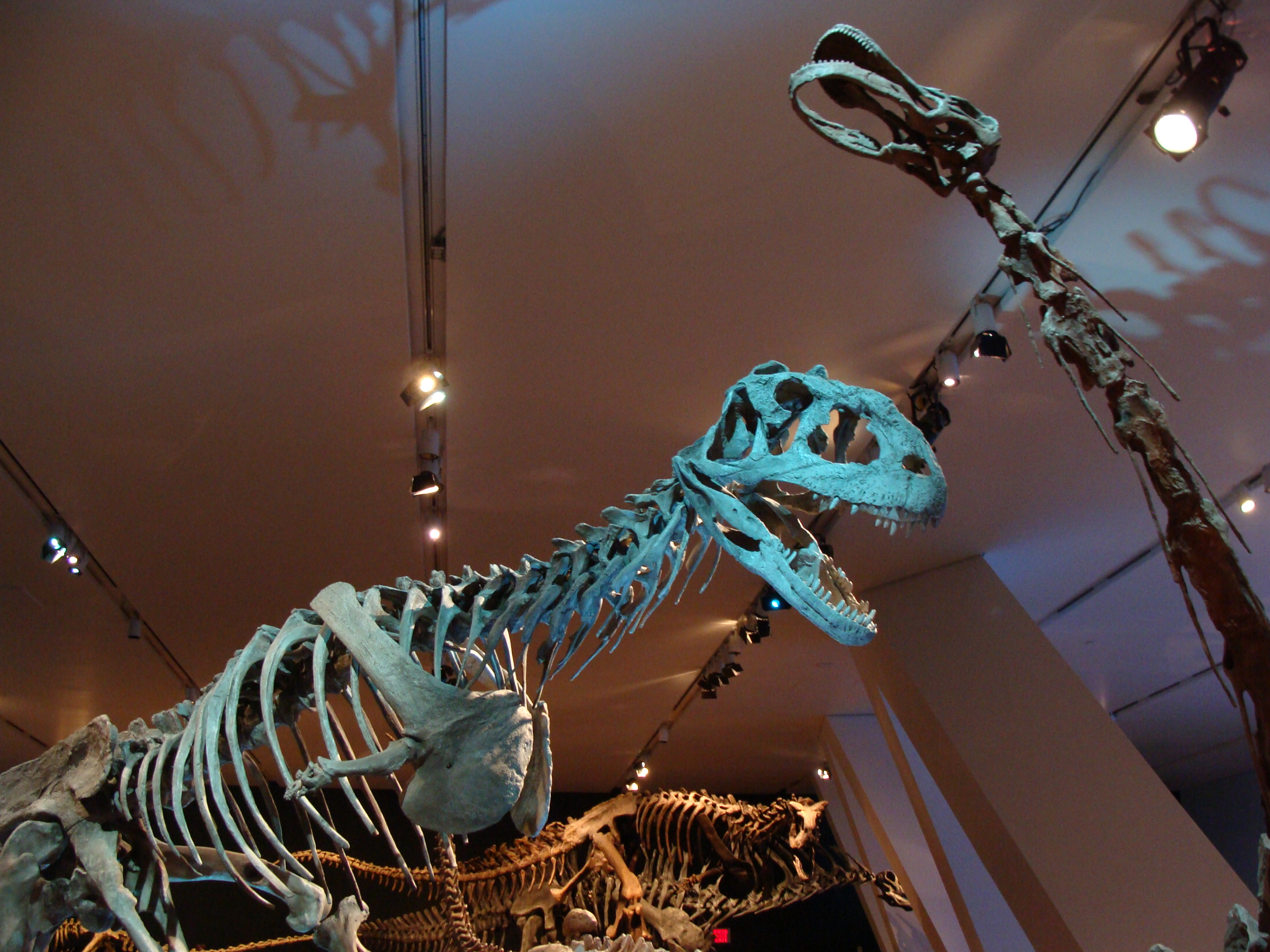
Mounted Majungasaurus and Rapetosaurus

During the Maastrichtian, like it is now, Madagascar was an island, having separated from the Indian subcontinent less than 20 million years earlier. It was drifting northwards but still 10–15° more southerly in latitude than it is today. The prevailing climate of the time was semi-arid, with pronounced seasonality in temperature and rainfall. Many prehistoric animals inhabited a coastal flood plain cut by many sandy river channels. Strong geological evidence suggests the occurrence of periodic debris flows through these channels at the beginning of the wet season, burying the carcasses of organisms killed during the preceding dry season and providing for their exceptional preservation as fossils. Sea levels in the area were rising throughout the Maastrichtian, and would continue to do so into the Paleocene Epoch, so Rapetosaurus may have roamed coastal environments like tidal flats as well. The neighboring Berivotra Formation represents the contemporaneous marine environment.

Besides Rapetosaurus, fossil taxa recovered from the Maevarano include fish, frogs, lizards, snakes, seven distinct species of crocodylomorphs, five or six species of mammals, Vorona and several other birds, the possibly flighted dromaeosaurid Rahonavis, the noasaurid Masiakasaurus, and the abelisaurid Majungasaurus. A variety of extinct mammals have also been discovered, such as gondwanatheres and non-placental eutherians, the former reaching large sizes such as Vintana.

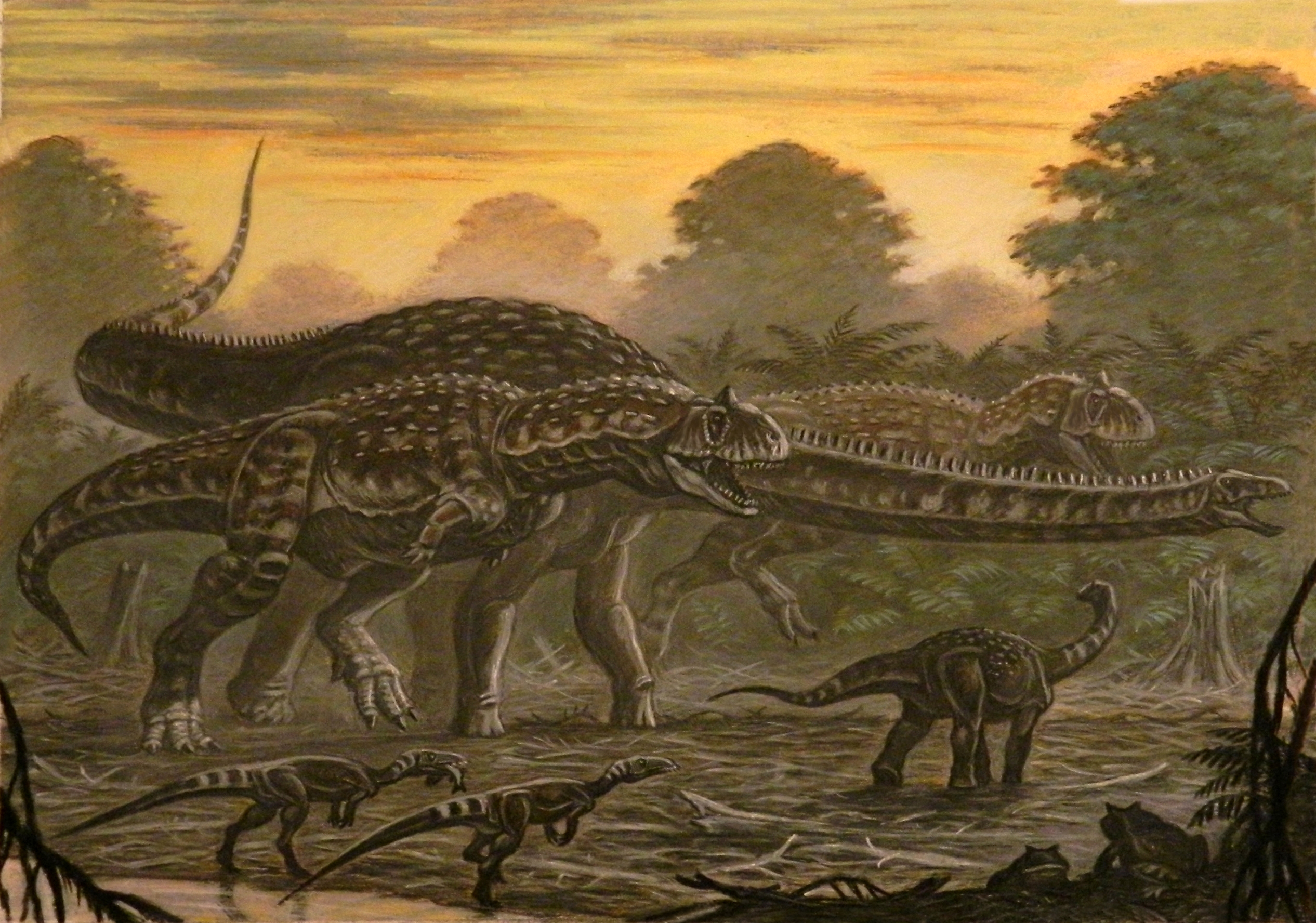
Restoration of two Majungasaurus chasing Rapetosaurus

The skull of Majungasaurus, a large abelisaurid theropod, was discovered in 1996. It is similar to species found in India and Argentina, indicating that land bridges between the fragments of the former supercontinent of Gondwana still existed in the late Cretaceous, far later than was previously believed. The most likely occurrence was a land bridge allowing animals to cross from South America to Antarctica, and then up to Madagascar and India. Majungasaurus was the largest predator in its environment, while the only known contemporaneous large herbivores were sauropods like Rapetosaurus. Scientists have suggested that Majungasaurus specialized in hunting sauropods. Majungasaurus tooth marks on Rapetosaurus bones indicate that it at least fed on these sauropods, whether or not it actually killed them.

Typically, titanosaurs were unusual among sauropods in that they coexisted with large ornithischian dinosaurs such as ceratopsids, hadrosaurs, and ankylosaurs. However, Rapetosaurus was atypical among titanosaurs in that it shared the Mahajanga basin with only one other large herbivore, another titanosaur. Smaller herbivores were rare, with only one, Simosuchus, being discovered during over 100 years of collection in that area. Due to the absence of ornithischian dinosaurs, it is suggested that prehistoric Madagascar saw a different herbivore community dynamic than was seen elsewhere in the Cretaceous.

== Sources ==
- Kristina Curry Rogers, and Catherine A. Forster. 2004. "The skull of Rapetosaurus krausei (Sauropoda: Titanosauria) from the Late Cretaceous of Madagascar". Journal of Vertebrate Paleontology, 24(1), pages 121–144. Abstract at BioOne
