= Kristina Curry Rogers =

American paleontologist (born 1974)

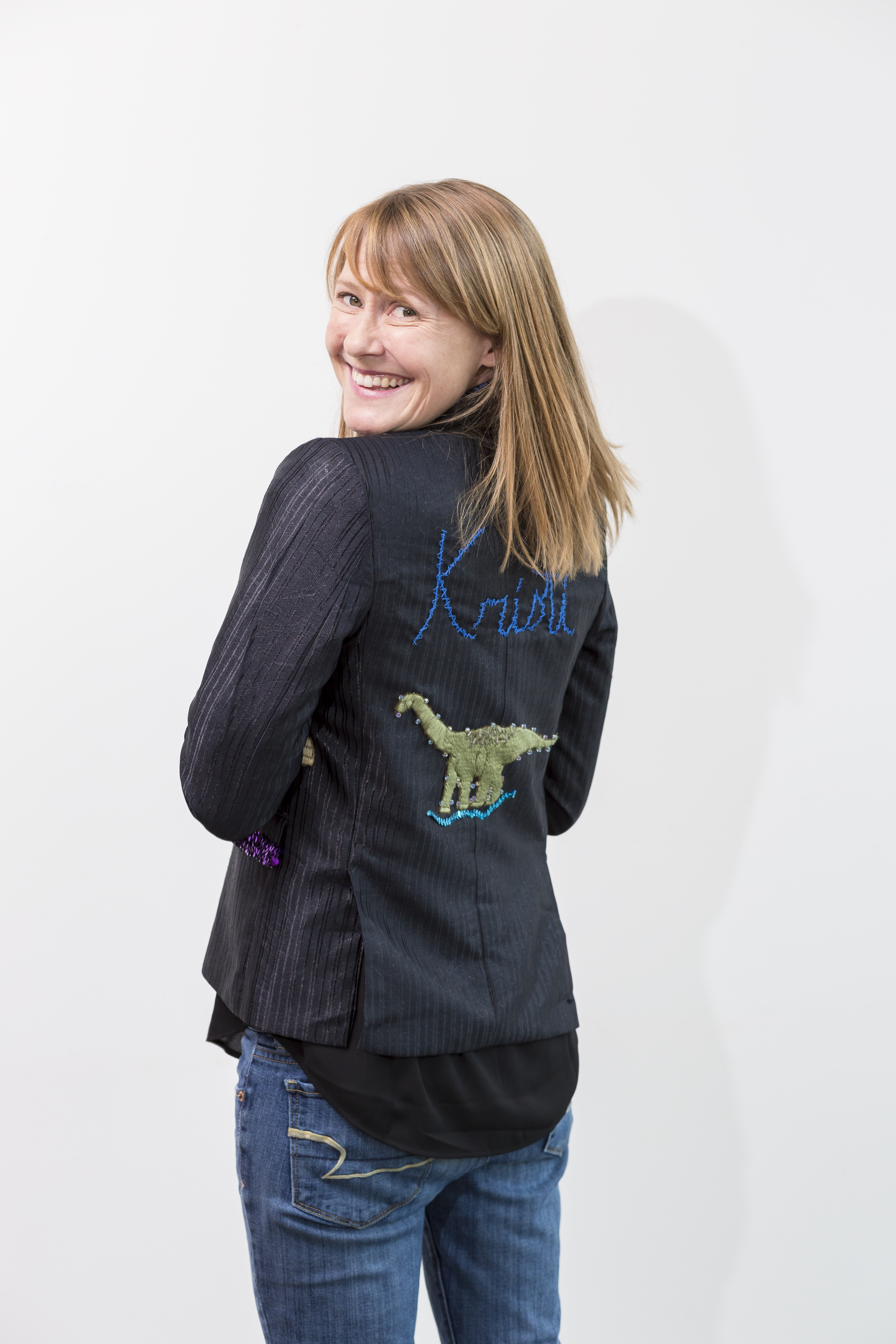
- Rogers in a dinosaur-embroidered blazer
- Born: June 20, 1974 (age 52); Sikeston, Missouri, U.S.
- Education: Degree in Biology from Montana State University, MSc and PhD in Anatomical Sciences from Stony Brook University
- Spouse: Ray Rogers
- Children: 2 daughters

Kristina "Kristi" Curry Rogers (born June 20, 1974) is an American vertebrate paleontologist and a professor in Biology and Geology at Macalester College. Her research focuses on questions of dinosaur paleobiology, bone histology, growth, and evolution, especially in a subgroup of sauropods called Titanosauria. She has named two dinosaur species from Madagascar, Rapetosaurus, the most complete Cretaceous sauropod and titanosaur found to date, and Vahiny, so far known only from a partial skull. She and Jeffrey A. Wilson co-edited The Sauropods, Evolution and Paleobiology, published in December 2005. Her research includes field work in Argentina, Madagascar, Montana, South Africa, and Zimbabwe.

== Early life and education ==
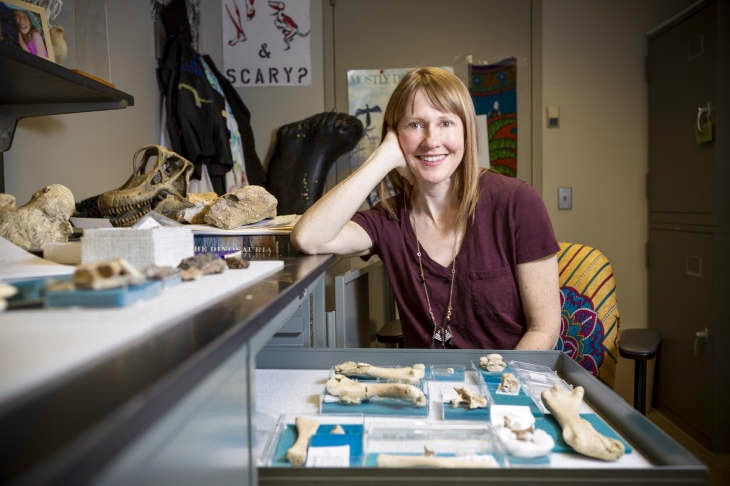
Rogers in her lab at Macalester College

Rogers was born in Sikeston, Missouri, the daughter of Terry Curry, a second grade public school teacher, and Pat Curry, Sikeston Public Schools band director. Kristi attended Sikeston High School, where she was an SHS Varsity Twirler, and the Secretary of the Red Peppers, an SHS Pep Club. Curry Rogers was a Girl Scout, and participated in a Wider Opportunity that allowed her to dig dinosaurs for the first time. As a high school senior, she earned the Girl Scout Gold Award.

She was an undergraduate at Montana State University, where she majored in Biology, worked at the Museum of the Rockies, and began her research on the long-necked, giant dinosaurs known as sauropods. Rogers published her undergraduate research on growth rates in the sauropod dinosaur, "Apatosaurus" in 1999.

Rogers completed both her MSc and PhD in Anatomical Sciences from Stony Brook University in 2001. Her graduate advisors, Catherine Forster and David W. Krause, were founding members of the Mahajanga Basin Project, a long-term, National Science Foundation and National Geographic Society-supported research program focused on the Upper Cretaceous Maevarano Formation.

Her graduate research focused on the evolutionary history of Titanosauria. Since then, she has continued to publish work elucidating titanosaur anatomy and paleobiology. This includes identifying the smallest known post-hatching titanosaur fossils from Madagascar, which helped to elucidate that these dinosaurs exhibited precocity and likely lacked significant parental care. Rogers has also recently published work related to the growth rates of the earliest known dinosaurs and their contemporaries, from the Late Triassic Ischigualasto Formation of Argentina.

== Career ==
In 2001, Rogers was hired as the Curator of Paleontology at the Science Museum of Minnesota, where she worked until 2008. At that time, she took a position at Macalester College, where she was jointly appointed in the Biology and Geology Departments. From 2019-2022, she served as Chair of Biology at Macalester College. In 2023 she was appointed as a Dewitt Wallace Professor of Biology and Geology.

She is also an active member of the Society of Vertebrate Paleontology, the Geological Society of America, and the Society for Integrative Comparative Biology. From 2024 - 2026, Curry was the vice-president of the Society of Vertebrate Paleontology and is currently the president of the society.

== Awards and honours ==
Rogers has been the recipient of a number of National Science Foundation grants, including the prestigious NSF CAREER award. Rogers was awarded the Macalester College Jack and Marty Rossman Excellence in Teaching Award in 2015.

Rogers has also served as an on screen expert for numerous documentaries with the BBC, PBS, the National Geographic Channel, and the Discovery Channel, and is featured in the large format film Titanosaur 3D: The Story of Maximo. She is also as a frequent guest on radio and television programs. Rogers is the featured editor in the Great Courses course, Rediscovering the Age of Dinosaurs.

== Family ==
She is married to Macalester College geologist Ray Rogers, and has two daughters.

== Selected bibliography ==
- Curry, Kristina A. (13 December 1999). "Ontogenetic histology of Apatosaurus (Dinosauria: Sauropoda): New insights on growth rates and longevity". Journal of Vertebrate Paleontology. 19 (4): 654–665. Bibcode:1999JVPal..19..654C. doi:10.1080/02724634.1999.10011179.
- Castanet, J., K. Curry Rogers, J. Cubo, and J. J. Boisard. 2000. Quantification of periosteal osteogenesis in ostrich and emu: Implications for studies of extinct dinosaurian bone histology. Comptes Rendus l'Académie des Sciences.
- Erickson, Gregory M.; Rogers, Kristina Curry; Yerby, Scott A. (July 2001). "Dinosaurian growth patterns and rapid avian growth rates". Nature. 412 (6845): 429–433. Bibcode:2001Natur.412..429E. doi:10.1038/35086558. PMID 11473315. S2CID 4319534. (Erratum: doi:10.1038/nature16488, PMID 26675731, Retraction Watch)
- Curry Rogers, Kristina; Forster, Catherine A. (August 2001). "The last of the dinosaur titans: a new sauropod from Madagascar". Nature. 412 (6846): 530–534. Bibcode:2001Natur.412..530C. doi:10.1038/35087566. PMID 11484051. S2CID 4347583.
- Curry Rogers, K. 2001. "Growth Rates among the dinosaurs" in The Scientific American Book of Dinosaurs (Paul, G., ed.). pp. 297–309.
- Rogers, R.R., D.W. Krause, and K. Curry Rogers. (2003). Cannibalism in the Madagascan dinosaur Majungatholus atopus. Nature. 422:515-518.
- Curry Rogers, K and Forster, C. A. (2004) The skull of Rapetosaurus krausei (Sauropoda: Titanosauria) from the Late Cretaceous of Madagascar. Journal of Vertebrate Paleontology 24(1): 121–143.
- Rogers, R.R., K. Curry Rogers, D. Munyikwa, R. Terry, and B. Singer. (2004). New insights into Karoo-equivalent rocks in the Limpopo Valley of Zimbabwe, with observations on the preservation of early dinosaurs. Journal of African Earth Sciences, 40:147-161.
- Curry Rogers, K. A. (2005), "Titanosauria: A Phylogenetic Overview" in Curry Rogers and Wilson (eds), The Sauropods: Evolution and Paleobiology pp. 50–103
- Krause, D. W., P. M. O'Connor, K. Curry Rogers, S. Sampson, G. Buckley, and R. R. Rogers. (2006). Late Cretaceous Terrestrial Vertebrates from Madagascar: Implications for Latin American Biogeography. Annals of the Missouri Botanical Garden 93:178-208.
- Salgado, L., R. A. Coria, C. M. Magalhaes Ribeiro, A. Garrido, R. Rogers, M. E. Simón, A. B. Arcucci, K. Curry Rogers, A.P. Carabajal, S. Apesteguía, M. Fernández, R. A. García, and M. Talevi. (2007). Upper Cretaceous dinosaur nesting sites of Río Negro (Salitral Ojo de Agua and Salinas de Trapalcó-Salitral de Santa Rosa), northern Patagonia, Argentina. Cretaceous Research 28:392-404.
- Rogers, R. R., D. W. Krause, K. Curry Rogers, A. H. Rasoamiaramanana, and L. Rahantarisoa. (2007). Paleoenvironment and Paleoecology of Majungasaurus crenatissimus (Theropoda: Abelisauridae) from the Late Cretaceous of Madagascar. Journal of Vertebrate Paleontology Memoir 8 27(suppl. to 2):21-31.
- Erickson, G. M., K. Curry Rogers, D. J. Varricchio, M. A. Norell, and Xing Xu. (2007). Growth patterns in brooding dinosaurs reveal the timing of sexual maturity in non-avian dinosaurs and genesis of the avian condition. Biological Letters 3:558-561.
- Wilson, J. A., M. D. D'Emic, K. Curry Rogers, D. M. Mohabey, and S. Sen. (2009). Reassessment of the sauropod dinosaur Jainosaurus (= "Antarctosaurus") septentrionalis from the Upper Cretaceous of India. Contributions from the University of Michigan Museum of Paleontology 32:17-40.
- Curry Rogers, K. (2009). The postcranial anatomy of Rapetosaurus krausei (Sauropoda: Titanosauria). Journal of Vertebrate Paleontology 29:1046-1086.
- Stein, K., Z. Csiki, K. Curry Rogers, D. B. Weishampel, R. Redelstorff, J. L. Carballido, and P. M. Sander. (2010). Small body size and extreme cortical bone remodeling indicate phyletic dwarfism in Magyarosaurus dacus (Sauropoda: Titanosauria). Proceedings of the National Academy of Science 107: 9258-9263.
- Curry Rogers, Kristina; D'Emic, Michael; Rogers, Raymond; Vickaryous, Matthew; Cagan, Amanda (September 2011). "Sauropod dinosaur osteoderms from the Late Cretaceous of Madagascar". Nature Communications. 2 (1): 564. Bibcode:2011NatCo...2..564C. doi:10.1038/ncomms1578. PMID 22127060.
- Wilson, J. A. and K. Curry Rogers. (2012). The Sauropods, in M. Brett-Surman, T. Holtz, Jr., and J. O. Farlow (eds.), The Complete Dinosaur, Second Edition. Indiana University Press, Bloomington: 444-481.
- Curry Rogers, K. and M. D'Emic. (2012). Triumph of the Titans. Scientific American 306(5): 48-55.
- Curry Rogers, K. and J. A. Wilson. (2014). Vahiny depereti gen. et sp. nov., a new titanosaur from the Upper Cretaceous Maevarano Formation, Madagascar. Journal of Vertebrate Paleontology 34: 606-617.
- Erickson, Gregory M.; Curry Rogers, Kristina; Yerby, Scott A. (24 March 2016). "Correction: Corrigendum: Dinosaurian growth patterns and rapid avian growth rates". Nature. 531 (7595): 538. doi:10.1038/nature16488. PMID 26675731. S2CID 4462067.
- Curry Rogers, K., M. Whitney, M. D'Emic, and B. Bagley. (2016). Precocity in a tiny titanosaur from the Late Cretaceous of Madagascar. Science 352:450-454.
- Rogers, R. R., M. Carrano, K. Curry Rogers, M. Perez, and A. Regan. (2017). Isotaphonomy in concept and practice: an exploration of vertebrate microfossil bonebeds in the Upper Cretaceous (Campanian) Judith River Formation, north-central Montana. Paleobiology 43:248-273.
- Rogers, Raymond R.; Curry Rogers, Kristina A.; Bagley, Brian C.; Goodin, James J.; Hartman, Joseph H.; Thole, Jeffrey T.; Zatoń, Michał (1 May 2018). "Pushing the record of trematode parasitism of bivalves upstream and back to the Cretaceous". Geology. 46 (5): 431–434. Bibcode:2018Geo....46..431R. doi:10.1130/G40035.1.
- Curry Rogers, Kristina; Kulik, Zoe (4 July 2018). "Osteohistology of Rapetosaurus krausei (Sauropoda: Titanosauria) from the Upper Cretaceous of Madagascar". Journal of Vertebrate Paleontology. 38 (4): (1)–(24). Bibcode:2018JVPal..3893689C. doi:10.1080/02724634.2018.1493689. S2CID 92144618.

=== Books ===
- Curry Rogers, Kristina; Wilson, Jeffrey (2005). The Sauropods: Evolution and Paleobiology. University of California Press. ISBN 978-0-520-24623-2.

Reviews:

- Norman, David (2006). "True Giants on Earth". Science. 312 (5770): 57. doi:10.1126/science.1126250. JSTOR 3845971. S2CID 161258764.
- Schweitzer, Mary Higby (2007). "Review of The Sauropods: Evolution and Paleobiology". Copeia. 2007 (1): 234–237. doi:10.1643/0045-8511(2007)7[234:TSEAP]2.0.CO;2. JSTOR 4126517. S2CID 83597127.
- Sidor, Christian A. (2006). "Review of The Sauropods: Evolution and Paleobiology". Integrative and Comparative Biology. 46 (3): 348. doi:10.1093/icb/icj032. JSTOR 3884743.
- Irmis, Randall B. (2007). "Review of The Sauropods: Evolution and Paleobiology". Journal of Vertebrate Paleontology. 27 (3): 776. doi:10.1671/0272-4634(2007)27[776:TSEAP]2.0.CO;2. JSTOR 30126387. S2CID 84109405.
- Fiorillo, Anthony R. (2006). "Review of The Sauropods: Evolution and Paleobiology". Great Plains Research. 16 (2): 203–204. JSTOR 23780064.
- Sues, Hans-Dieter (September 2006). "The Sauropods: Evolution and Paleobiology. Based on a symposium held in 2001 at the Society of Vertebrate Paleontology Annual Meeting. Edited by Kristina A Curry Rogers and, Jeffrey A Wilson. Berkeley (California): University of California Press. $65.00. ix + 349 p; ill.; index. ISBN: 0-520-24623-3. 2005". The Quarterly Review of Biology. 81 (3): 271–272. doi:10.1086/509404.
