= Vahiny =

Vahiny Temporal range: Maastrichtian ~70–66 Ma

Scientific classification
- Kingdom: Animalia
- Phylum: Chordata
- Class: Reptilia
- Clade: Dinosauria
- Clade: Saurischia
- Clade: †Sauropodomorpha
- Clade: †Sauropoda
- Clade: †Macronaria
- Clade: †Titanosauria
- Clade: †Colossosauria
- Genus: †Vahiny; Curry Rogers & Wilson, 2014

Type species
- †Vahiny depereti Curry Rogers & Wilson, 2014

Extinct genus of dinosaurs

Vahiny (meaning "traveller" in Malagasy) is an extinct genus of titanosaur sauropod dinosaur known from the Late Cretaceous of the Maevarano Formation, northwestern Madagascar. It contains a single species, Vahiny depereti.

== Description ==
Vahiny was first described and named by Kristina Curry Rogers and Jeffrey A. Wilson in 2014 and the type species is Vahiny depereti. It is known solely from the Late Cretaceous Maevarano Formation located in northwestern Madagascar, together with the more common titanosaur, Rapetosaurus krausei. Rapetosaurus is the most common dinosaur in its fauna and is known from hundreds of bones, including multiple partial skeletons and skulls, while other taxa are extremely rare, including Vahiny identified from a partial braincase. Vahiny is distinguished from other titanosaurs by characteristics of its braincase, including the basal tubera, basipterygoid processes, parasphenoid and cranial nerve foramina. Differences in the braincases of Vahiny and Rapetosaurus indicate that they are not closely related to one another. Vahiny is most similar to Jainosaurus from the Late Cretaceous of India, and bears similarities to the South American taxa Muyelensaurus and Pitekunsaurus.

== Paleoenvironment and diet ==
Vahiny lived in what was once a semiarid coastal floodplain. This area experienced distinct wet and dry seasons. The ecosystem was rich with diverse wildlife, including other dinosaurs such as the theropods Majungasaurus and Masiakasaurus, but also, another titanosaur, Rapetosaurus. The environment also contained various crocodylomorphs (ancient crocodile relatives) like Mahajangasuchus and the pug-nosed Simosuchus, as well as frogs like the giant Beelzebufo, snakes, and early birds.

As a sauropod, Vahiny was a herbivore. It would have used its long neck to browse on vegetation, possibly feeding on a variety of plants available in its habitat, such as conifers, cycads, and early flowering plants. Its large size would have required it to consume vast quantities of plant matter daily to sustain itself.
