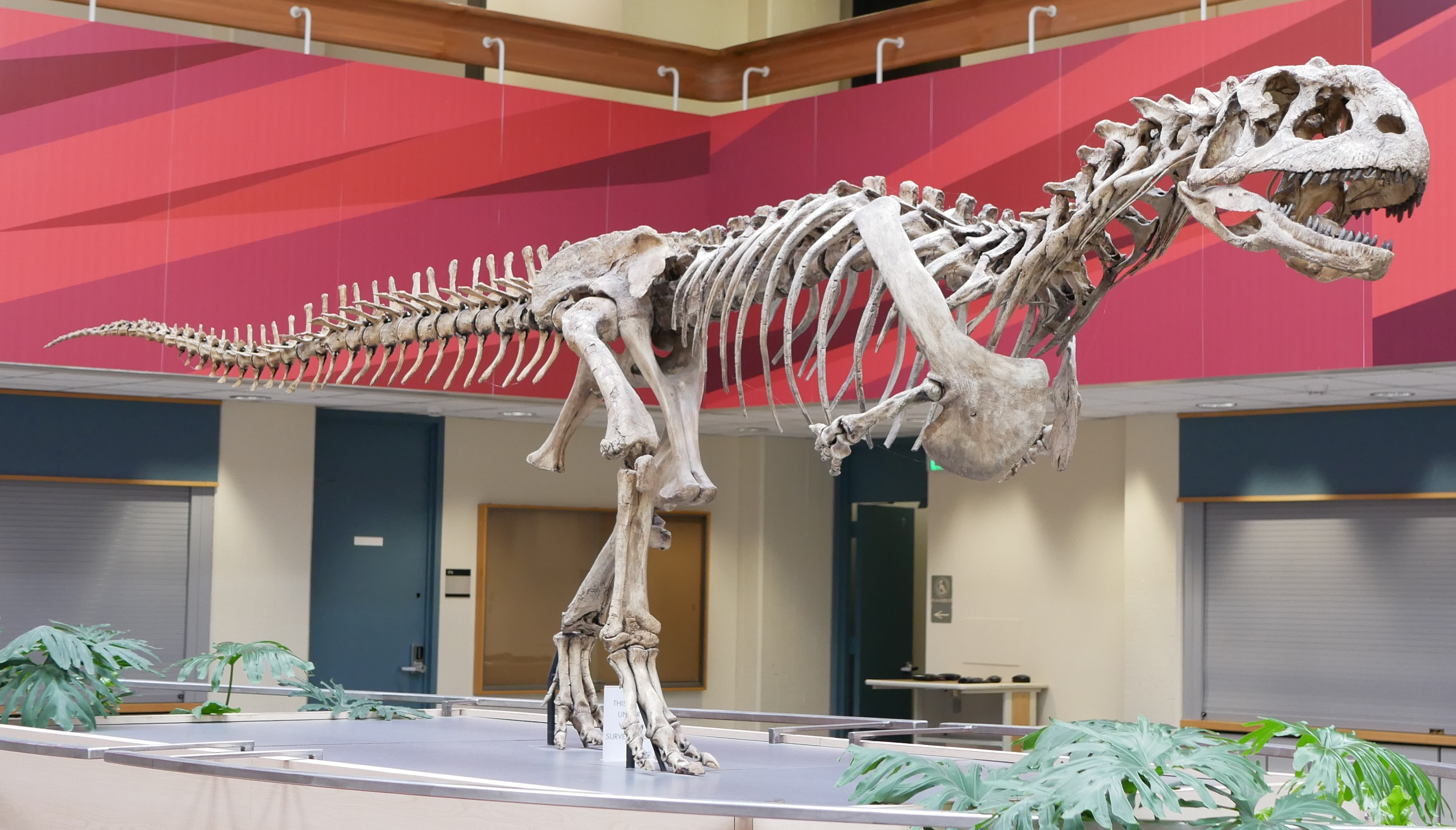
- Mounted skeleton, Stony Brook University

Scientific classification
- Kingdom: Animalia
- Phylum: Chordata
- Class: Reptilia
- Clade: Dinosauria
- Clade: Saurischia
- Clade: Theropoda
- Superfamily: †Abelisauroidea
- Family: †Abelisauridae
- Subfamily: †Majungasaurinae
- Genus: †Majungasaurus; Lavocat, 1955
- Species: †M. crenatissimus

Binomial name
- †Majungasaurus crenatissimus (Depéret, 1896) [originally Megalosaurus]

Synonyms
- Megalosaurus crenatissimus Depéret, 1896; Majungatholus atopus Sues & Taquet, 1979

= Majungasaurus =

Majungasaurus Temporal range: Late Cretaceous (Maastrichtian), 70–66 Ma

Abelisaurid theropod dinosaur from the Late Cretaceous period

Majungasaurus (/məˌdʒʌŋɡəˈsɔːrəs/; lit. 'Mahajanga lizard') is a genus of abelisaurid theropod dinosaur that lived in Madagascar from 70 to 66 million years ago, at the end of the Cretaceous Period, making it one of the last-known, non-avian dinosaurs that went extinct during the Cretaceous–Paleogene extinction event. The genus contains a single species, Majungasaurus crenatissimus. This dinosaur was also called Majungatholus, which is considered a junior synonym of Majungasaurus.

Like other abelisaurids, Majungasaurus was a bipedal predator with a short snout. Although the fore limbs are not completely known, they were very short, while the hind limbs were longer and very stocky. Measuring around 7 m (23 ft) long and weighing more than 1 t (1.1 short tons), it can be distinguished from other abelisaurids by its wider skull, the very rough texture and thickened bone on the top of its snout, and the single rounded horn on the roof of its skull, which was originally mistaken for the dome of a pachycephalosaur. It also had more teeth in both its upper and lower jaws than most abelisaurids.

The genus is one of the first abelisaurs to be discovered, first being found in 1896 (although it was thought to be a species of Megalosaurus) and being named in 1955. Known from several well-preserved skulls and abundant skeletal material, Majungasaurus has recently become one of the best-studied theropod dinosaurs from the Southern Hemisphere. It appears to be most closely related to abelisaurids from India rather than South America or continental Africa, a fact that has important biogeographical implications. Majungasaurus was the apex predator in its ecosystem, mainly preying on sauropods such as Rapetosaurus, and is also one of the few dinosaurs for which direct evidence of cannibalism has been found.

== Discovery and naming ==
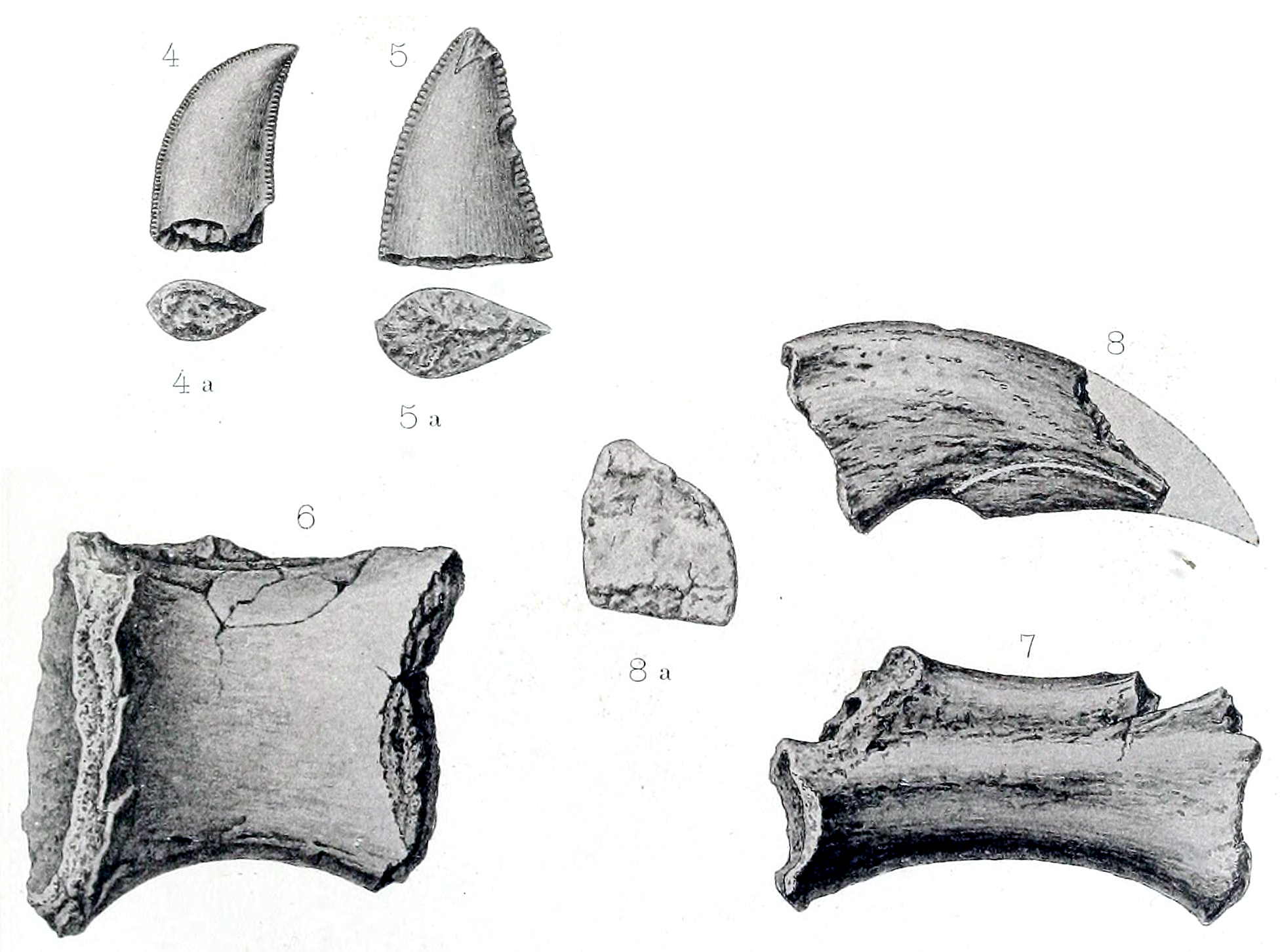
Original material described in 1896

French paleontologist Charles Depéret described the first theropod remains from northwestern Madagascar in 1896. These included two teeth, a claw, and some vertebrae discovered along the Betsiboka River by a French army officer and deposited in the collection of what is now the Université Claude Bernard Lyon 1. Depéret referred these fossils to the genus Megalosaurus, which at the time was a wastebasket taxon containing any number of unrelated large theropods, as the new species M. crenatissimus. This name is derived from the Latin word crenatus ("notched") and the suffix -issimus ("most"), in reference to the numerous serrations on both front and rear edges of the teeth. Depéret later reassigned the species to the North American genus Dryptosaurus, another poorly known taxon.

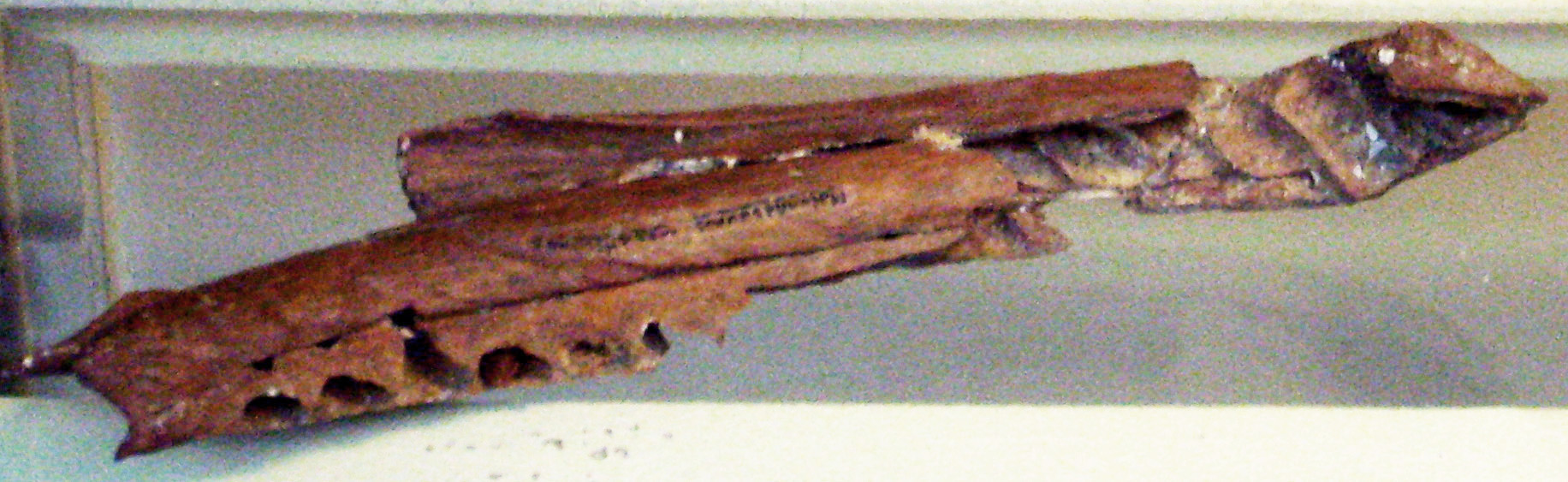
Neotype specimen of M. crenatissimus (MNHN.MAJ 1), the right dentary of a subadult individual in the Gallery of Paleontology and Comparative Anatomy – Muséum national d'histoire naturelle, Paris

Numerous fragmentary remains from Mahajanga Province in northwestern Madagascar were recovered by French collectors over the next 100 years, many of which were deposited in the Muséum National d'Histoire Naturelle in Paris. In 1955, René Lavocat described a theropod dentary (MNHN.MAJ 1) with teeth from the Maevarano Formation in the same region where the original material was found. The teeth matched those first described by Depéret, but the strongly curved jaw bone was very different from both Megalosaurus and Dryptosaurus. Based on this dentary, Lavocat created the new genus Majungasaurus, using an older spelling of Mahajanga, as well as the Greek word σαυρος sauros (meaning "lizard"). Hans-Dieter Sues and Philippe Taquet described a dome-shaped skull fragment (MNHN.MAJ 4) as a new genus of pachycephalosaur (Majungatholus atopus) in 1979. This was the first report of a pachycephalosaur in the Southern Hemisphere.

In 1993, scientists from the State University of New York at Stony Brook and the University of Antananarivo began the Mahajanga Basin Project, a series of expeditions to examine the fossils and geology of the Late Cretaceous sediments near the village of Berivotra, in Mahajanga Province. Among these scientists was paleontologist David W. Krause of Stony Brook. The first expedition turned up hundreds of theropod teeth identical to those of Majungasaurus, some of which were attached to an isolated premaxilla that was described in 1996. The following seven expeditions turned up tens of thousands of fossils, many of which belonged to species new to science. The Mahajanga Basin Project claims credit for quintupling the known diversity of fossil taxa in the region.

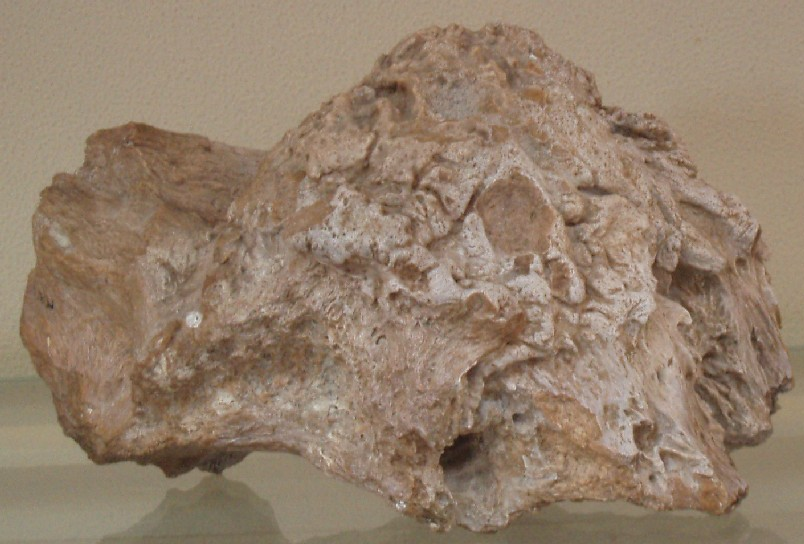
Type specimen of Majungatholus atopus: a Majungasaurus frontal horn misidentified as a pachycephalosaur dome in the Gallery of Paleontology and Comparative Anatomy (MNHN.MAJ 1)

Fieldwork in 1996 turned up a spectacularly complete theropod skull preserved in exquisite detail (FMNH PR 2100). On top of this skull was a dome-shaped swelling nearly identical to the one described by Sues and Taquet as Majungatholus atopus. Majungatholus was redescribed as an abelisaurid rather than a pachycephalosaur in 1998. Although the name Majungasaurus crenatissimus was older than Majungatholus atopus, the authors judged the type dentary of Majungasaurus too fragmentary to confidently assign to the same species as the skull. Further fieldwork over the next decade turned up a series of less complete skulls, as well as dozens of partial skeletons of individuals ranging from juveniles to adults. Project members also collected hundreds of isolated bones and thousands of shed Majungasaurus teeth. Taken together, these remains represent nearly all the bones of the skeleton, although most of the fore limbs, most of the pelvis, and the tip of the tail are still unknown. This fieldwork culminated in a 2007 monograph consisting of seven scientific papers on all aspects of the animal's biology, published in the Society of Vertebrate Paleontology Memoirs. The papers are in English, although each has an abstract written in Malagasy. In this volume, the dentary described by Lavocat was re-evaluated and determined to be diagnostic for this species. Therefore, the name Majungatholus was replaced by the older name Majungasaurus. Although the monograph is comprehensive, the editors noted that it describes only material recovered from 1993 through 2001. A significant quantity of specimens, some very complete, were excavated in 2003 and 2005 and await preparation and description in future publications. The dentary was made the neotype specimen after a 2009 petition to the ICZN.

== Description ==
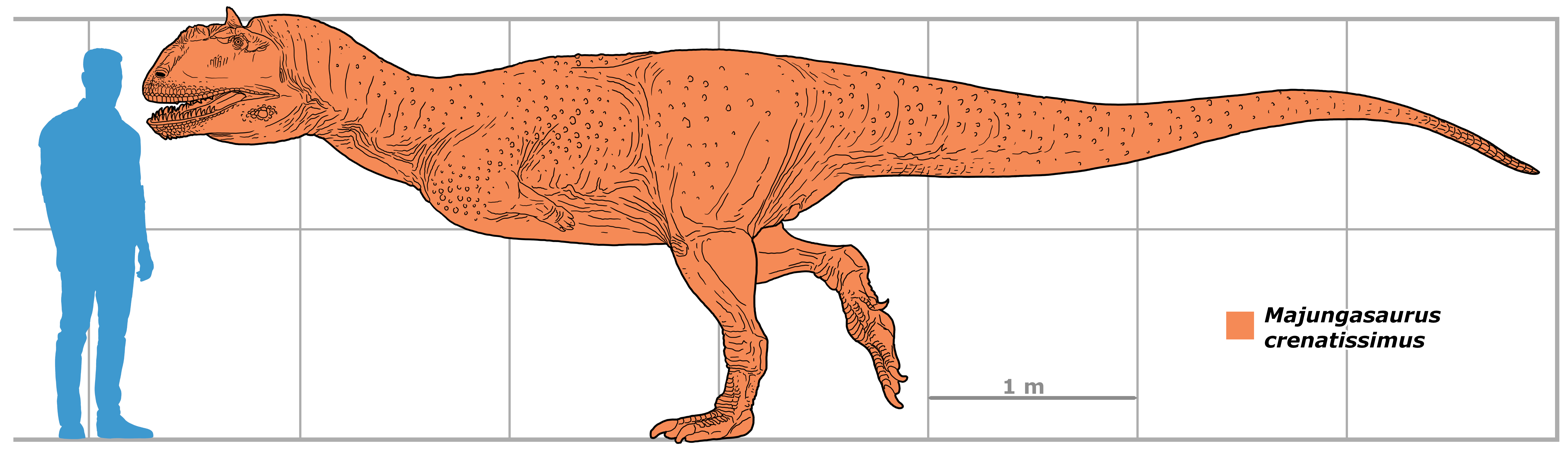
Majungasaurus compared in size to a human

Majungasaurus was a medium-sized theropod that typically reached 5.6–7.0 m (18.4–23.0 ft) in length and weighed 750–1,100 kg (1,650–2,430 lb). Fragmentary remains of larger individuals indicate that some adults could have been similar in size to its relative Carnotaurus, possibly exceeding 8 m (26 ft) in length.

The skull of Majungasaurus is exceptionally well-known compared to most theropods and generally similar to that of other abelisaurids. Like other abelisaurid skulls, its length was proportionally short for its height, although not as short as in Carnotaurus. The skulls of large individuals measured 60–70 cm (24–28 in) long. The tall premaxilla (frontmost upper jaw bone), which made the tip of the snout very blunt, was also typical of the family. However, the skull of Majungasaurus was markedly wider than in other abelisaurids. All abelisaurids had a rough, sculptured texture on the outside faces of the skull bones, and Majungasaurus was no exception. This was carried to an extreme on the nasal bones of Majungasaurus, which were extremely thick and fused together, with a low, central ridge running along the half of the bone closest to the nostrils. A distinctive, dome-like horn protruded from the fused frontal bones on top of the skull as well. In life, these structures would have been covered with some sort of integument, possibly made of keratin. Computed tomography (CT scanning) of the skull shows that both the nasal structure and the frontal horn contained hollow sinus cavities, perhaps to reduce weight. The teeth were typical of abelisaurids in having short crowns, although Majungasaurus bore 17 teeth in both the maxilla of the upper jaw and the dentary of the lower jaw, more than in any other abelisaurid except Rugops.

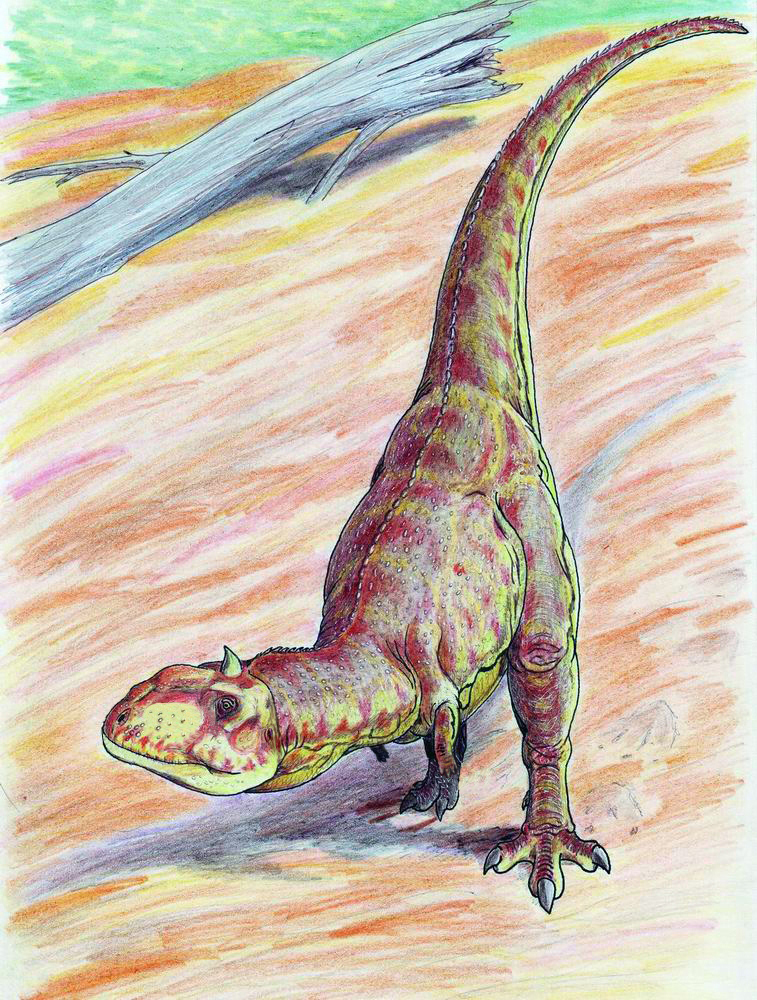
Life restoration

The postcranial skeleton of Majungasaurus closely resembles those of Carnotaurus and Aucasaurus, the only other abelisaurid genera for which complete skeletal material is known. Majungasaurus was bipedal, with a long tail to balance out the head and torso, putting the center of gravity over the hips. Although the cervical (neck) vertebrae had numerous cavities and excavations (pleurocoels) to reduce their weight, they were robust, with exaggerated muscle attachment sites and ribs that interlocked for strength. Ossified tendons are attached to the cervical ribs, giving them a forked appearance, as seen in Carnotaurus. All of these features resulted in a very strong and muscular neck. Uniquely, the cervical ribs of Majungasaurus had long depressions along the sides for weight reduction. The humerus (upper arm bone) was short and curved, closely resembling those of Aucasaurus and Carnotaurus. Also, like related dinosaurs, Majungasaurus had very short fore limbs with four extremely reduced digits, first reported with only two very short external fingers and no claws. The hand and finger bones of Majungasaurus, like other majungasaurines, lacked the characteristic pits and grooves where claws and tendons would normally attach, and its finger bones were fused together, indicating that the hand was immobile. In 2012, a better specimen was described, showing that the lower arm was robust, though short, and that the hand contained four metatarsals and four, probably inflexible and very reduced, fingers, possibly with no claws. The minimum phalangial formula was 1-2-1-1.

Like other abelisaurids, the hind limbs were stocky and short compared to body length. The tibia (lower leg bone) of Majungasaurus was even stockier than that of its relative Carnotaurus, with a prominent crest on the knee. The astragalus and calcaneum (ankle bones) were fused together, and the feet bore three functional digits, with a smaller first digit that did not contact the ground.

== Classification and systematics ==
Majungasaurus is classified as a member of the theropod clade Abelisauridae, which is considered a family in Linnaean taxonomy. Along with the family Noasauridae, abelisaurids are included in the superfamily Abelisauroidea, which is in turn a subdivision of the infraorder Ceratosauria. Abelisaurids are known for their tall skulls with blunt snouts, extensive sculpturing on the outer surfaces of the facial bones (convergent with carcharodontosaurids), very reduced (atrophied) forelimbs (convergent with tyrannosaurids), and stocky hind limb proportions, among other features.

As with many dinosaur families, the systematics (evolutionary relationships) within the family Abelisauridae are confused. Several cladistic studies have indicated that Majungasaurus shares a close relationship with Carnotaurus from South America, while others were unable to firmly place it in the phylogeny. The most recent analysis, using the most complete information, instead recovered Majungasaurus in a clade with Rajasaurus and Indosaurus from India, but excluding South American genera such as Carnotaurus, Ilokelesia, Ekrixinatosaurus, Aucasaurus, and Abelisaurus, as well as Rugops from mainland Africa. This leaves open the possibility of separate clades of abelisaurids in western and eastern Gondwana.

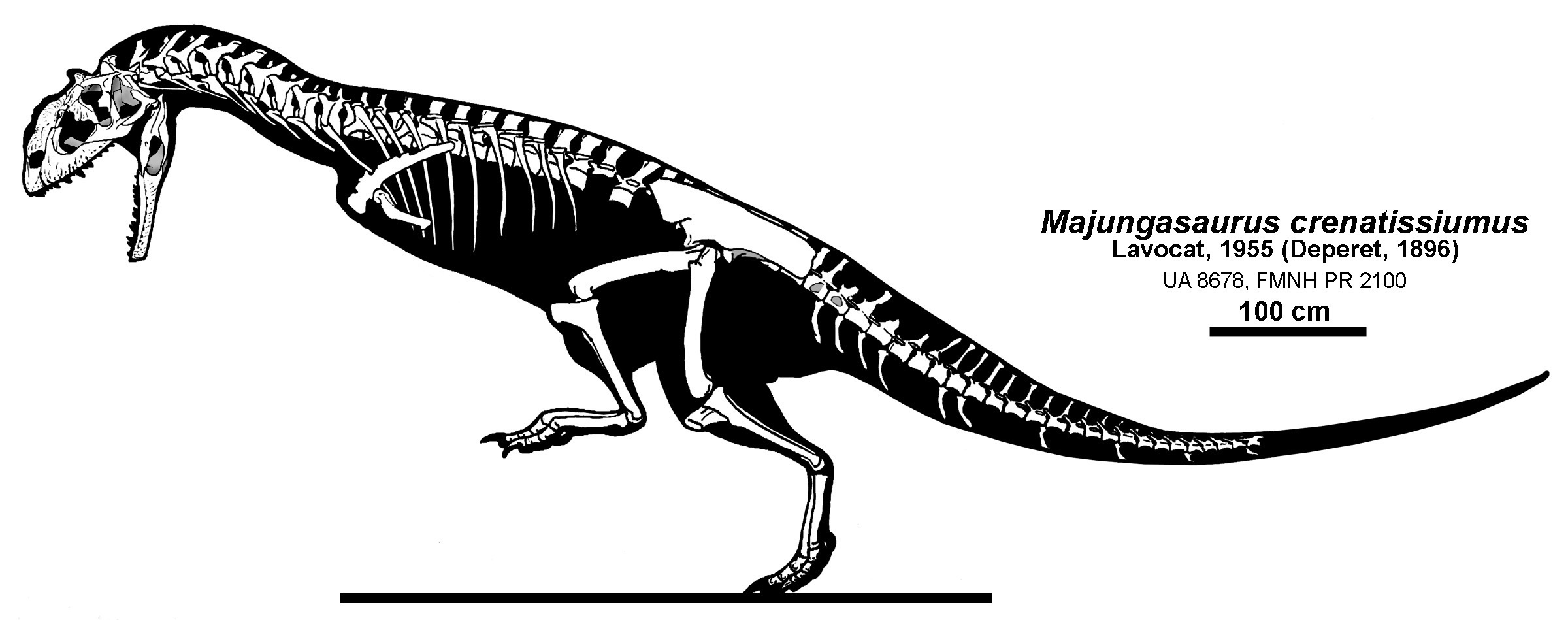
Skeletal restoration showing known elements of two specimens

A cladogram by Tortosa et al. 2013 places Majungasaurus in a new subfamily, the Majungasaurinae. A simplified version showing the taxa within the group is shown below.

- Majungasaurinae
  - Pourcieux abelisaurid
  - Arcovenator
  - Majungasaurus
  - Indosaurus
  - Rahiolisaurus
  - Rajasaurus

== Paleobiology ==
=== Skull ornamentation ===
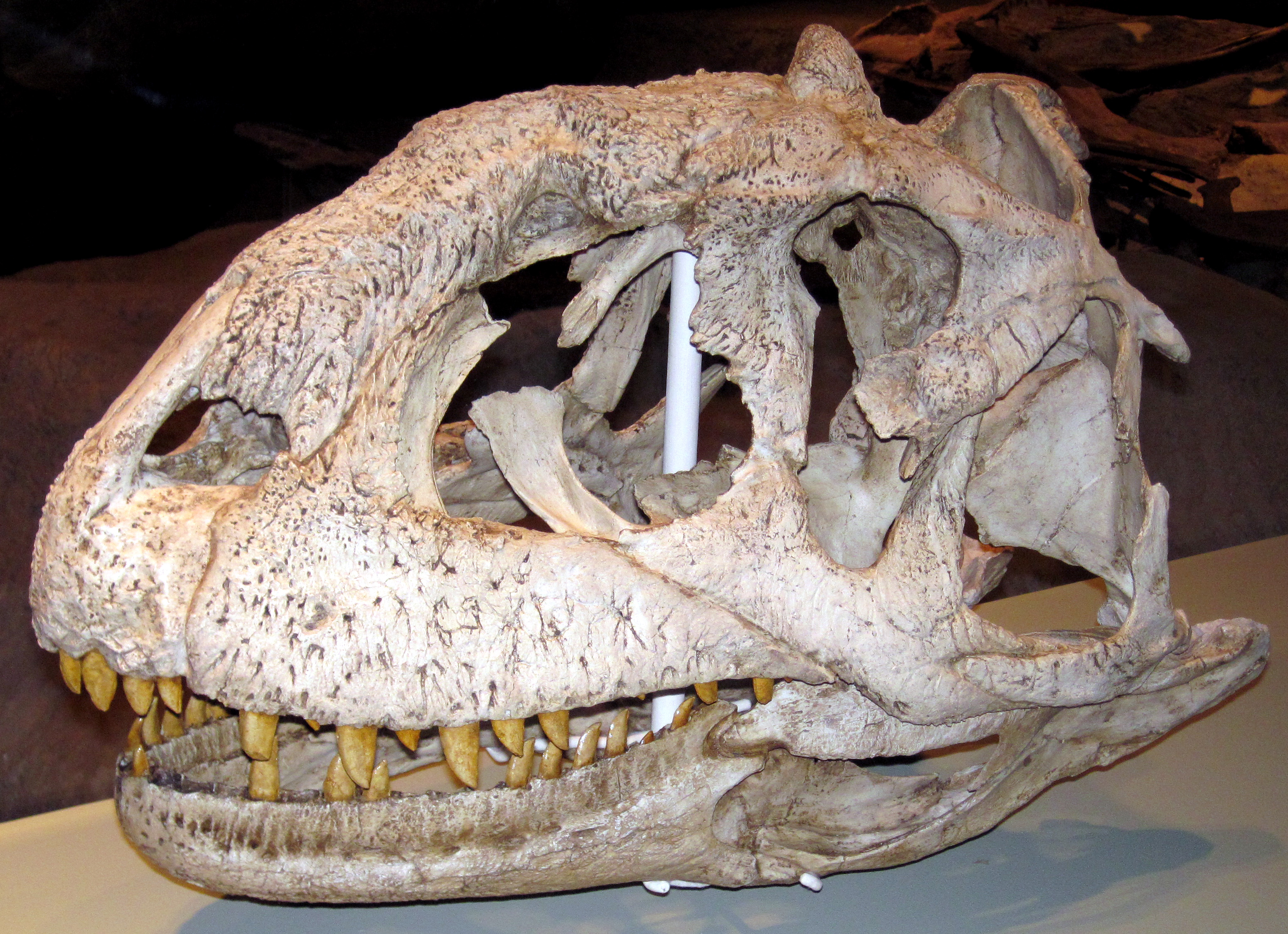
Skull cast of FMNH PR 2100

Majungasaurus is perhaps most distinctive for its skull ornamentation, including the swollen and fused nasals and the frontal horn. Other ceratosaurs, including Carnotaurus, Rajasaurus, and Ceratosaurus itself bore crests on the head. These structures are likely to have played a role in intraspecific competition, although their exact function within that context is unknown. The hollow cavity inside the frontal horn of Majungasaurus would have weakened the structure and probably precluded its use in direct physical combat, although the horn may have served a display purpose. While variation exists in the ornamentation of Majungasaurus individuals, no evidence for sexual dimorphism has been found.

=== Feeding ===
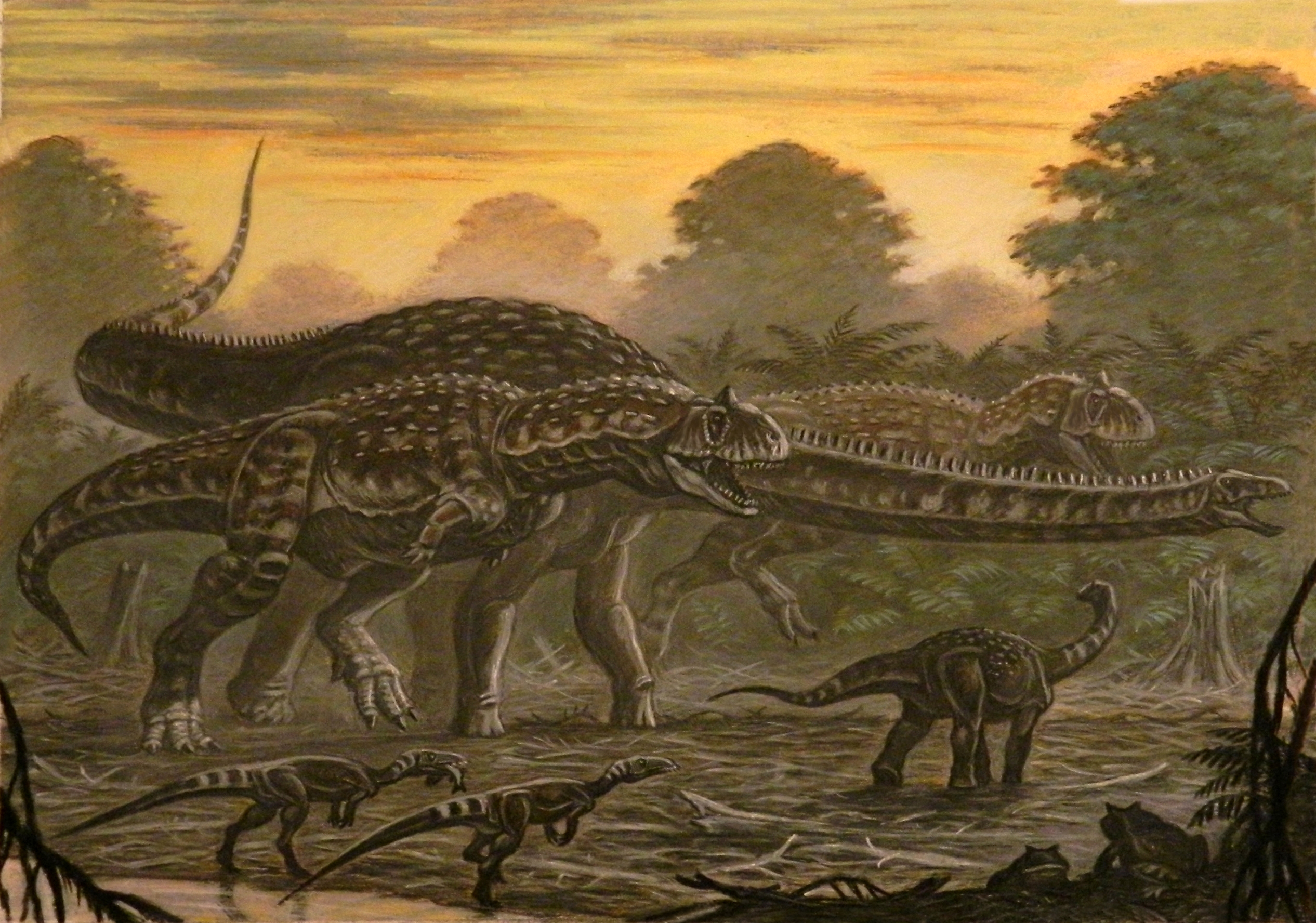
Restoration of two Majungasaurus chasing a Rapetosaurus

Scientists have suggested that the unique skull shape of Majungasaurus and other abelisaurids indicate predatory habits different from other theropods. Whereas most theropods were characterized by long, low skulls of narrow width, abelisaurid skulls were taller and wider, and often shorter in length, as well. The narrow skulls of other theropods were well equipped to withstand the vertical stress of a powerful bite, but not as good at withstanding torsion (twisting). In comparison to modern mammalian predators, most theropods may have used a strategy similar in some ways to that of long- and narrow-snouted canids, with the delivery of many bites weakening the prey animal.

Abelisaurids, especially Majungasaurus, instead may have been adapted for a feeding strategy more similar to modern felids, with short and broad snouts that bite once and hold on until the prey is subdued. Majungasaurus had an even broader snout than other abelisaurids, and other aspects of its anatomy may also support the bite-and-hold hypothesis. The neck was strengthened with robust vertebrae, interlocking ribs, and ossified tendons, as well as reinforced muscle attachment sites on the vertebrae and the back of the skull. These muscles would have been able to hold the head steady despite the struggles of its prey.

Abelisaurid skulls were also strengthened in many areas by bone mineralized out of the skin, creating the characteristic rough texture of the bones. This is particularly true of Majungasaurus, where the nasal bones were fused and thickened for strength. The lower jaw of Majungasaurus, though, sported a large fenestra (opening) on each side, as seen in other ceratosaurs, as well as synovial joints between certain bones that allowed a high degree of flexibility in the lower jaw, although not to the extent seen in snakes. This may have been an adaptation to prevent the fracture of the lower jaw when holding onto a struggling prey animal. The front teeth of the upper jaw were more robust than the rest to provide an anchor point for the bite, while the low crown height of Majungasaurus teeth prevented them from breaking off during a struggle. Finally, unlike the teeth of Allosaurus and most other theropods, which were curved on both the front and back, abelisaurids including Majungasaurus had teeth curved on the front edge, but straighter on the back (cutting) edge. This structure may have served to prevent slicing and instead holding the teeth in place when biting. Examination of the teeth of Majungasaurus indicates that the theropod replaced its teeth from 2 to 13 times faster than other theropods, replacing the entire set within a span of 2 months. Gnawing on bone may have been a significant reason for such rapid tooth replacement.

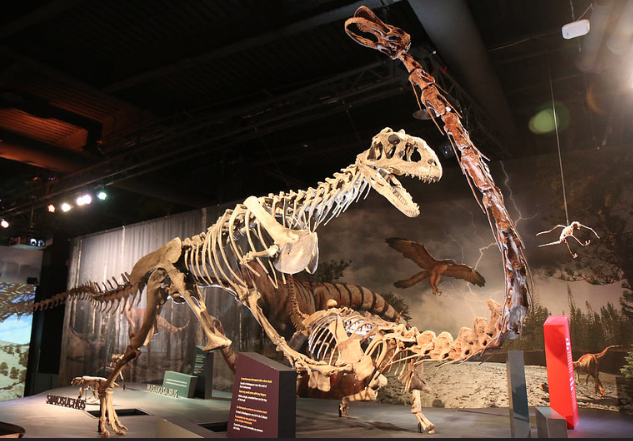
Mounted skeletons of Majungasaurus and Rapetosaurus

Majungasaurus was the largest predator in its environment, while the only known large herbivores at the time were sauropods such as Rapetosaurus. Majungasaurus, and perhaps other abelisaurids, may have specialized in hunting sauropods. Adaptations to strengthen the head and neck for a bite-and-hold type of attack might have been very useful against sauropods, which would have been tremendously powerful animals. This hypothesis may also be supported by the hind legs of Majungasaurus, which were short and stocky, as opposed to the longer and more slender legs of most other theropods. While Majungasaurus would not have moved as fast as other similar-sized theropods, it would have had no trouble keeping up with slow-moving sauropods. The robust hind limb bones suggest very powerful legs, and their shorter length would have lowered the animal's center of gravity. Thus, Majungasaurus may have sacrificed speed for power. Majungasaurus tooth marks on Rapetosaurus bones confirm that it at least fed on these sauropods, whether or not it actually killed them.

=== Cannibalism ===
Although sauropods may have been the prey of choice for Majungasaurus, discoveries published in 2007 detail finds in Madagascar that indicate the presence of other Majungasaurus in their diet. Numerous bones of Majungasaurus have been discovered bearing tooth marks identical to those found on sauropod bones from the same localities. These marks have the same spacing as teeth in Majungasaurus jaws, are of the same size as Majungasaurus teeth, and contain smaller notches consistent with the serrations on those teeth. As Majungasaurus is the only large theropod known from the area, the simplest explanation is that it was feeding on other members of its own species. Suggestions that the Triassic Coelophysis was a cannibal have been recently disproven, leaving Majungasaurus as the only non-avian theropod with confirmed cannibalistic tendencies, although there is some evidence that cannibalism may have occurred in other species as well.

Whether Majungasaurus actively hunted its own kind or only scavenged their carcasses is unknown, but some researchers have noted that modern Komodo monitors sometimes kill each other when competing for access to carcasses. The lizards then proceed to cannibalize the remains of their rivals, which suggests similar behavior in Majungasaurus and other theropods.

=== Respiratory system ===
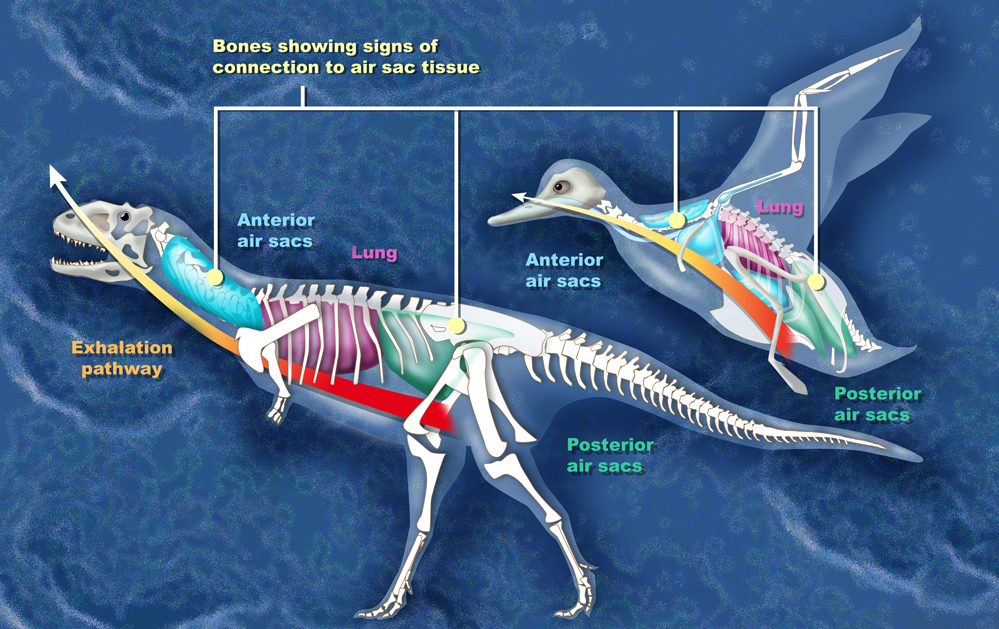
Comparison between the air sacs of Majungasaurus and a modern bird

Scientists have reconstructed the respiratory system of Majungasaurus based on a superbly preserved series of vertebrae (UA 8678) recovered from the Maevarano Formation. Most of these vertebrae and some of the ribs contained cavities (pneumatic foramina) that may have resulted from the infiltration of avian-style lungs and air sacs. In birds, the neck vertebrae and ribs are hollowed out by the cervical air sac, the upper back vertebrae by the lung, and the lower back and sacral (hip) vertebrae by the abdominal air sac. Similar features in Majungasaurus vertebrae imply the presence of these air sacs. These air sacs may have allowed for a basic form of avian-style 'flow-through ventilation,' where air flow through the lungs is one-way, so that oxygen-rich air inhaled from outside the body is never mixed with exhaled air laden with carbon dioxide. This method of respiration, while complicated, is highly efficient.

The recognition of pneumatic foramina in Majungasaurus, besides providing an understanding of its respiratory biology, also has larger-scale implications for evolutionary biology. The split between the ceratosaur line, which led to Majungasaurus, and the tetanuran line, to which birds belong, occurred very early in the history of theropods. The avian respiratory system, present in both lines, must therefore have evolved before the split, and well before the evolution of birds themselves. This provides further evidence of the dinosaurian origin of birds.

=== Brain and inner ear structure ===
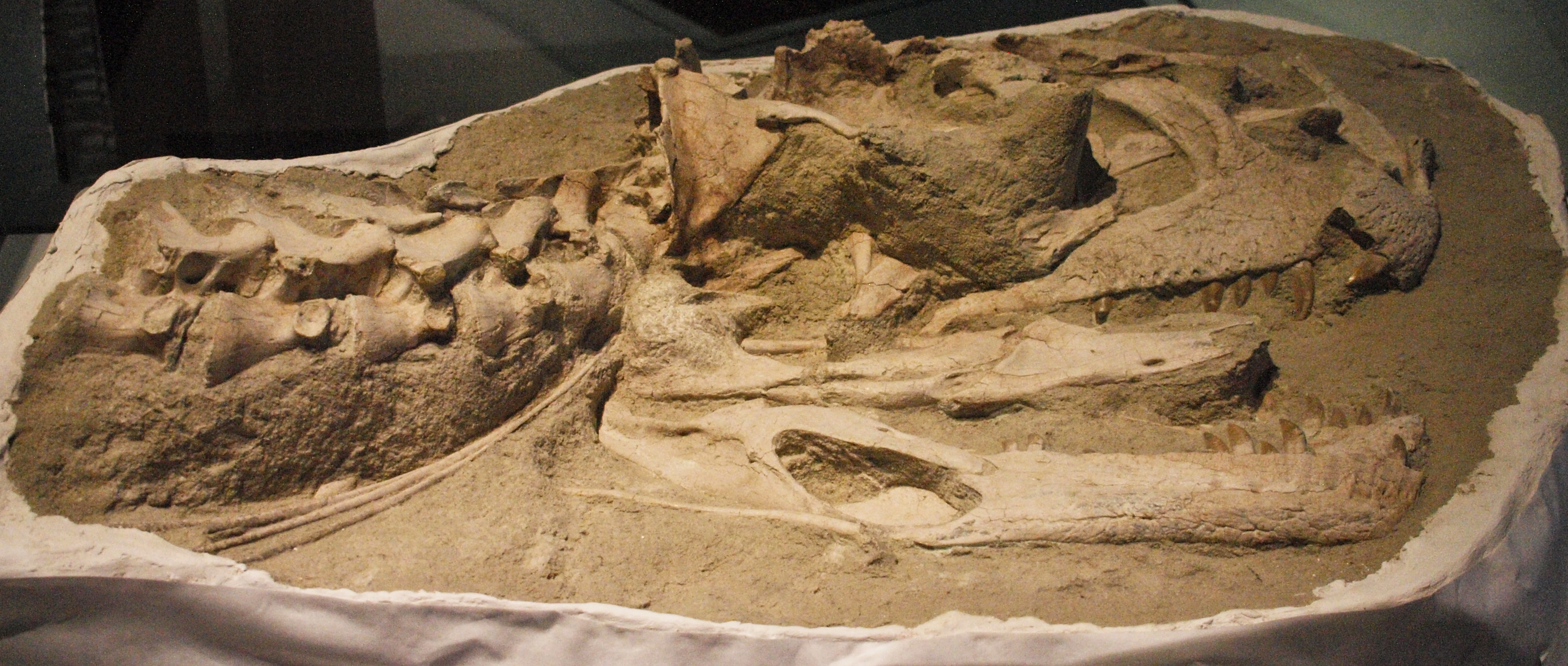
Head and neck of specimen FMNH PR 2836

Computed tomography of a complete Majungasaurus skull (FMNH PR 2100) allowed a rough reconstruction of its brain and inner ear structure. Overall, the brain was very small relative to body size, but otherwise similar to many other non-coelurosaurian theropods, with a very conservative form closer to modern crocodilians than to birds. One difference between Majungasaurus and other theropods was its smaller flocculus, a region of the cerebellum that helps to coordinate movements of the eye with movements of the head. This suggests that Majungasaurus and other abelisaurids like Indosaurus, which also had a small flocculus, did not rely on quick head movements to sight and capture prey.

Inferences about behavior can also be drawn from examination of the inner ear. The semicircular canals within the inner ear aid in balance, and the lateral semicircular canal is usually parallel to the ground when the animal holds its head in an alert posture. When the skull of Majungasaurus is rotated so that its lateral canal is parallel to the ground, the entire skull is nearly horizontal. This contrasts with many other theropods, where the head was more strongly downturned when in the alert position. The lateral canal is also significantly longer in Majungasaurus than in its more basal relative Ceratosaurus, indicating a greater sensitivity to side-to-side motions of the head.

=== Pathology ===
A 2007 report described pathologies in the bones of Majungasaurus. Scientists examined the remains of at least 21 individuals and discovered four with noticeable pathologies. While pathology had been studied in large tetanuran theropods like allosaurids and tyrannosaurids, this was the first time an abelisauroid had been examined in this manner. No wounds were found on any skull elements, in contrast to tyrannosaurids, where sometimes gruesome facial bites were common. One of the specimens was a phalanx (toe bone) of the foot, which had apparently been broken and subsequently healed.

Most of the pathologies occurred on the vertebrae. For example, a dorsal vertebra from a juvenile animal showed an exostosis (bony growth) on its underside. The growth probably resulted from the conversion of cartilage or a ligament to bone during development, but the cause of the ossification was not determined. Hypervitaminosis A and bone spurs were ruled out, and an osteoma (benign bone tumor) was deemed unlikely. Another specimen, a small caudal (tail) vertebra, was also found to have an abnormal growth, this time on the top of its neural spine, which projects upwards from the vertebrae, allowing muscle attachment. Similar growths from the neural spine have been found in specimens of Allosaurus and Masiakasaurus, probably resulting from the ossification of a ligament running either between the neural spines (interspinal ligament) or along their tops (supraspinal ligament).

The most serious pathology discovered was in a series of five large tail vertebrae. The first two vertebrae showed only minor abnormalities with the exception of a large groove that extended along the left side of both bones. However, the next three vertebrae were completely fused together at many different points, forming a solid bony mass. No sign was found of any other vertebrae after the fifth in the series, indicating that the tail ended there prematurely. From the size of the last vertebrae, scientists judged that about 10 vertebrae were lost. One explanation for this pathology is severe physical trauma resulting in the loss of the tail tip, followed by osteomyelitis (infection) of the last remaining vertebrae. Alternatively, the infection may have come first and led to the end of the tail becoming necrotic and falling off. This is the first example of tail truncation known in a non-avian theropod dinosaur.

The small number of specimens preserved with pathologies in Majungasaurus suggest that the multitude of injuries that occurred were obtained over the course of the lives of the individuals studied. Furthermore, the small number of injured Majungasaurus specimens observed amongst those recovered indicates most well preserved individuals generally lack observable pathologies, while a few select individuals were shown to have possessed multiple pathologies, a general pattern also noted in other large, non-avian theropods. Such patterns may be the result of a snowball effect, where one injury or an infection increased the likelihood of additional maladies and injuries due to functional impairment or compromised immune systems in individuals once an initial injury had occurred.

=== Ontogeny and growth ===
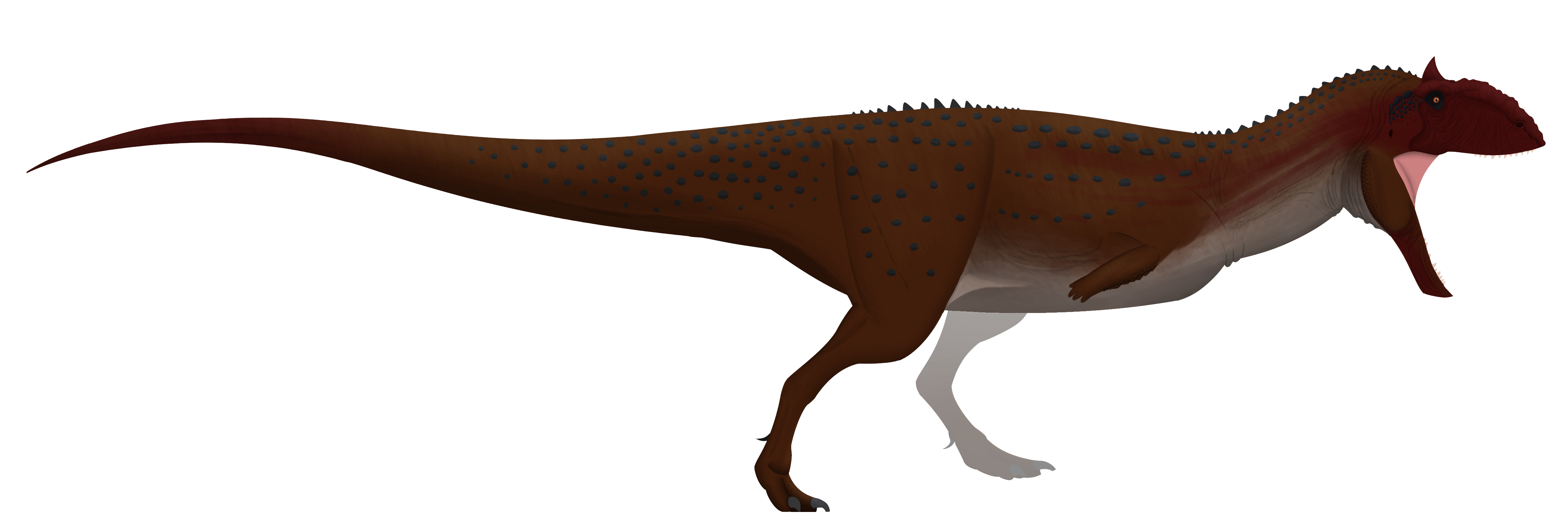
Restoration of an adult

Majungasaurus, being known from many well-preserved specimens of different ages, is well studied in regards to its growth and development. Throughout ontogeny, the skull of Majungasaurus (more specifically, the jugal, postorbital, and quadratojugal) seems to have become taller and more robust; additionally, the skull bones became more fused and the eye sockets became proportionally smaller. This indicates a shift in dietary preferences between juveniles and adults.

Research indicates that it was among the slowest-growing theropods. Based on studies of the lines of arrested growth in several bones, Majungasaurus was found to take 20 years to reach maturity, which may have been a result of the harsh environment in which it lived. However, other abelisaurids have also been found to have comparably slow growth rates.

== Paleoecology ==
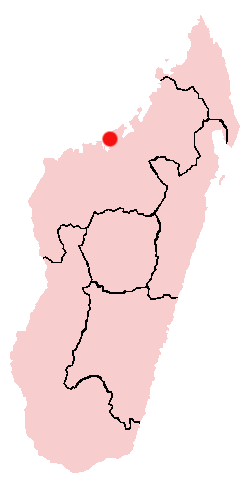
All Majungasaurus fossils have been found in the Mahajanga Province of Madagascar, most within 50 km (31 mi) to the southeast of the provincial capital, Mahajanga (marked with a red dot on the map).

All specimens of Majungasaurus have been recovered from the Maevarano Formation in the Mahajanga Province in northwestern Madagascar. Most of these, including all of the most complete material, came from the Anembalemba Member, although Majungasaurus teeth have also been found in the underlying Masorobe Member and the overlying Miadana Member. While these sediments have not been dated radiometrically, evidence from biostratigraphy and paleomagnetism suggest that they were deposited during the Maastrichtian stage, which lasted from 70 to 66 Mya (million years ago). Majungasaurus teeth are found up until the end of the Maastrichtian, when all non-avian dinosaurs became extinct.

Then as now, Madagascar was an island, having separated from the Indian subcontinent less than 20 million years earlier. It was drifting northwards but still 10 to 15° more southerly in latitude than it is today. The prevailing climate of the time was semiarid, with pronounced seasonality in temperature and rainfall. Majungasaurus inhabited a coastal floodplain cut by many sandy river channels. Strong geological evidence suggests the occurrence of periodic debris flows through these channels at the beginning of the wet season, burying the carcasses of organisms killed during the preceding dry season and providing for their exceptional preservation as fossils. Sea levels in the area were rising throughout the Maastrichtian, and would continue to do so into the Paleocene Epoch, so Majungasaurus may have roamed coastal environments like tidal flats, as well. The neighboring Berivotra Formation represents the contemporaneous marine environment.

Besides Majungasaurus, fossil taxa recovered from the Maevarano include fish, frogs, lizards, snakes, seven distinct species of crocodylomorphs, five or six species of mammals, Vorona and several other birds, the possibly flighted dromaeosaurid Rahonavis, the noasaurid Masiakasaurus and two titanosaurian sauropods, including Rapetosaurus. Majungasaurus was by far the largest carnivore and probably the dominant predator on land, although large crocodylomorphs such as Mahajangasuchus and Trematochampsa might have competed with it closer to water. The giant snake Madtsoia madagascariensis might have preyed on subadult Majungasaurus.

== See also ==
- Timeline of ceratosaur research
- Evolution of dinosaurs
