= Rahona =

Scientific classification
- Domain: Eukaryota
- Kingdom: Animalia
- Phylum: Arthropoda
- Class: Insecta
- Order: Lepidoptera
- Superfamily: Noctuoidea
- Family: Erebidae
- Subfamily: Lymantriinae
- Genus: Rahona; Griveaud, 1975

Genus of moths

Rahona is a genus of moths in the subfamily Lymantriinae. It was named by Paul Griveaud in 1975.

Most of the species of this genus occur in central Africa or Madagascar.

The name was inadvertently used again in 1998 for a fossil species of Avian theropod Rahona ostromi, by Catherine Forster and colleagues. When they discovered that the name had already been used by Griveaud, they renamed the fossil Rahonavis.

== Species ==
Some species of this genus are:

- Rahona albilunula (Collenette 1936)
- Rahona albimaculata Dall'Asta, 1981
- Rahona bicornuta Dall'Asta, 1981
- Rahona brunnea Dall'Asta, 1981
- Rahona brunneicubitata Dall'Asta, 1981
- Rahona caeruleibasalis Dall'Asta, 1981
- Rahona collenettei Dall'Asta, 1981
- Rahona compseuta (Collenette, 1939)
- Rahona hayesi Dall'Asta, 1981
- Rahona hecqui Dall'Asta, 1981
- Rahona hypnotoides (Collenette, 1957)
- Rahona ladburyi (Bethune-Baker, 1911)
- Rahona nigrofumata Dall'Asta, 1981
- Rahona seitzi (Hering, 1926)
- Rahona stauropa Dall'Asta, 1981
- Rahona stauropoeides (Collenette, 1960)
- Rahona subzairensis Dall'Asta, 1981
- Rahona unica Dall'Asta, 1981
- Rahona watsoni Dall'Asta, 1981
- Rahona zairensis Dall'Asta, 1981
