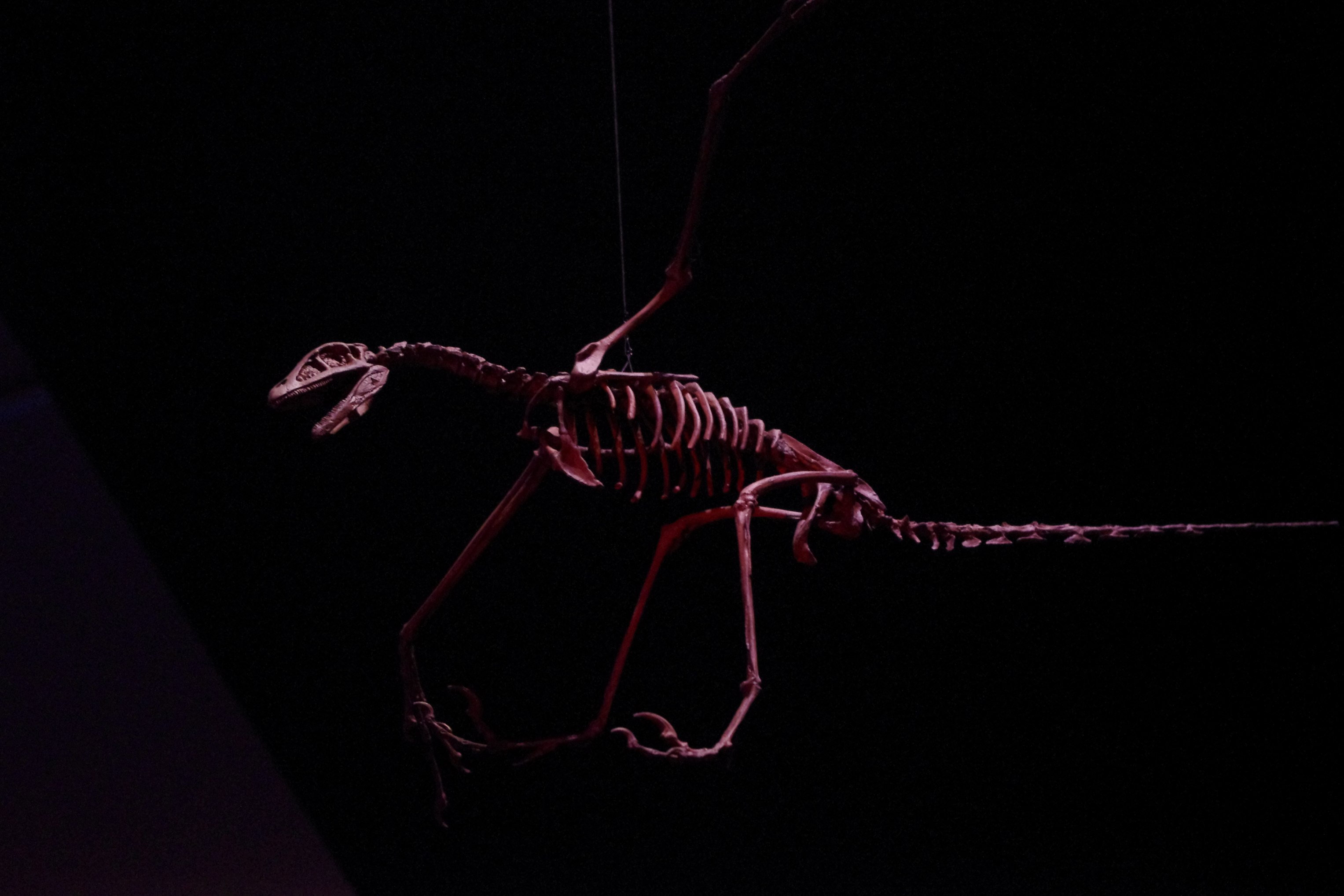
- Reconstructed skeleton, Royal Ontario Museum

Scientific classification
- Kingdom: Animalia
- Phylum: Chordata
- Class: Reptilia
- Clade: Dinosauria
- Clade: Saurischia
- Clade: Theropoda
- Clade: Paraves
- Clade: incertae sedis
- Genus: †Rahonavis; Forster et al., 1998b

Type species
- †Rahonavis ostromi (Forster et al., 1998a) Forster et al., 1998b

Synonyms
- Rahona Forster et al. 1998 non Griveaud 1975; Rahona ostromi Forster et al. 1998a

= Rahonavis =

Rahonavis Temporal range: Late Cretaceous (Maastrichtian) 70–66 Ma

Extinct genus of dinosaurs

Rahonavis is a genus of bird-like theropod from the Late Cretaceous (Maastrichtian, from about 70 to 66 mya) of what is now northwestern Madagascar. It is known from a partial skeleton (UA 8656) found by Catherine Forster and colleagues in Maevarano Formation rocks at a quarry near Berivotra, Mahajanga Province. Rahonavis was a small predator, at about 70 centimetres (2.3 ft) long and 0.45-2.27 kg (1-5 lbs), with the typical dromaesaurid-like raised sickle claw on the second toe. It was the first coelurosaur discovered in Africa, with Nqwebasaurus being the second.

The name Rahonavis means, approximately, "cloud menace bird", from Malagasy rahona (RA-hoo-na, "cloud" or "menace") + Latin avis "bird". The specific name, R. ostromi, was coined in honor of John Ostrom.

== Discovery and species ==
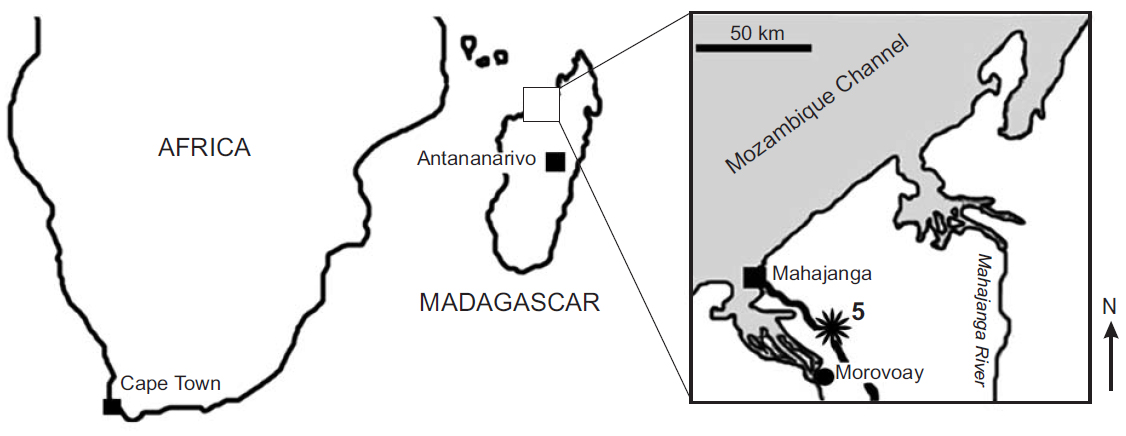
Location of the Maevarano Formation

The fossilized remains of Rahonavis were first recovered from the Maevarano Formation in Madagascar in 1995 by a joint expedition of SUNY and the University of Antananarivo, near the village of Berivotra. Most geological formations in this area are covered in dense grass, making identification of fossils difficult. However, when a portion of hillside was exposed by fire, the remains of a giant titanosaur were revealed. It was during the excavation of this find that paleontologists discovered the bones of Rahonavis among the bones of the much larger dinosaur. Rahonavis is known from this single specimen, consisting of the hind limbs, trunk, portions of the tail (all of which were found articulated), as well as portions of the wing and shoulder bones. Rahonavis was one-fifth larger than the closely related Archaeopteryx, about the size of a modern raven.

The discoverers of Rahonavis initially named it Rahona but changed the name after discovering that the name Rahona was already assigned to a genus of lymantriid moths.

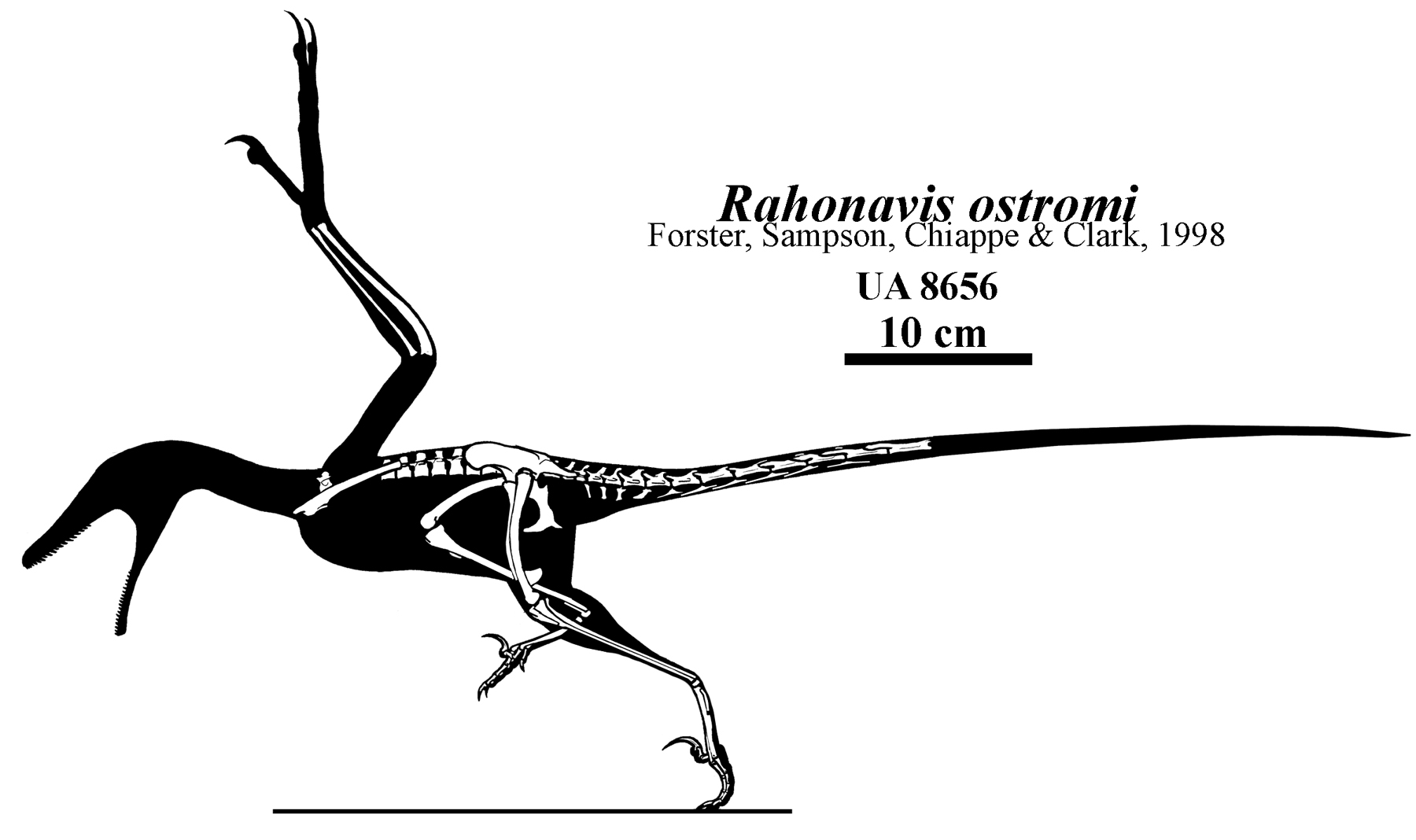
Skeletal diagram showing remains of the holotype specimen

The lack of well-documented relatives of this species notwithstanding, a single thoracic vertebra (NMC 50852) most similar to those of R. ostromi was found in the Albian to Cenomanian Kem Kem Beds in Morocco. Lacking the pleurocoels found in Rahonavis and having a larger neural canal, it appears to belong to a different genus. Although former character can vary in species of the same genus, in individual vertebrae of the same animal, and ontogenetically, the distance in space and time suggests that whatever this specimen may be, it does not belong into Rahonavis.

A dentary has been found in association with the holotype, though it is seldom described.

== Classification ==
Size compared to a human hand

Rahonavis has historically been the subject of some uncertainty as to its proper taxonomic position – whether it is a member of the clade Avialae (birds) or a closely related dromaeosaurid. The presence of quill knobs on its ulna (forearm bone) led initially to its inclusion as an avialan; however, the rest of the skeleton is rather typically dromaeosaurid in its attributes. Given the extremely close affinities between basal birds and their dromaeosaurid cousins, along with the possibility that flight may have developed and been lost multiple times among these groups, it has been difficult to place Rahonavis firmly among or outside the birds.

Rahonavis could be a close relative to Archaeopteryx, as originally suggested by the describers, and thus a member of the clade Avialae, but while the pelvis shows adaptations to flight similar in function to those of Archaeopteryx, some fringe researchers have claimed that these may have been independently derived.

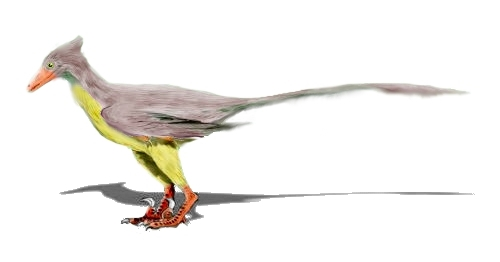
Hypothetical life restoration

Beginning in the early 2000s, a consensus emerged among most theropod researchers that Rahonavis was more closely related to deinonychosaurs than to avialans, and specifically was a member of the South American dromaeosaurid clade Unenlagiinae. A 2005 analysis by Makovicky and colleagues found Rahonavis to be closely related to the unenlagiines Unenlagia and Buitreraptor. Norell and colleagues (2006) also found Rahonavis to lie within the Unenlagiinae, as the sister taxon to Unenlagia itself. A 2007 study by Turner and colleagues again found it to be an unenlagiine dromaeosaurid, closely related to Unenlagia.

This consensus has been challenged, however, by a few studies published since 2009 that have found many traditional "dromaeosaurids", including the unenlagiines, closer to Avialae than to dromaeosaurines. A large analysis published by Agnolín and Novas (2013) recovered Rahonavis as closer to Avialae than to Dromaeosauridae. A cladistic analysis by Cau (2018) recovered Rahonavis as a probable relative of the long-tailed Early Cretaceous avialans Jeholornis and Jixiangornis. The analysis of Hartman et al. (2019) "strongly rejected" the supposed avialan position of Rahonavis, finding its placement in Unenlagiinae better supported as it takes 10 less steps. This placement suggests Rahonavis is one among multiple different paravian lineages that evolved flight independently. In 2020, Rahonavis and the South American Overoraptor were found to be sister taxa in a clade sister to the Avialae with a dataset based on that of the 2013 study. As of 2020, it is undecided among paleontologists whether the paravian Rahonavis is an unenlagiine, a dromaeosaurid, or an avialan.

== Paleobiology ==
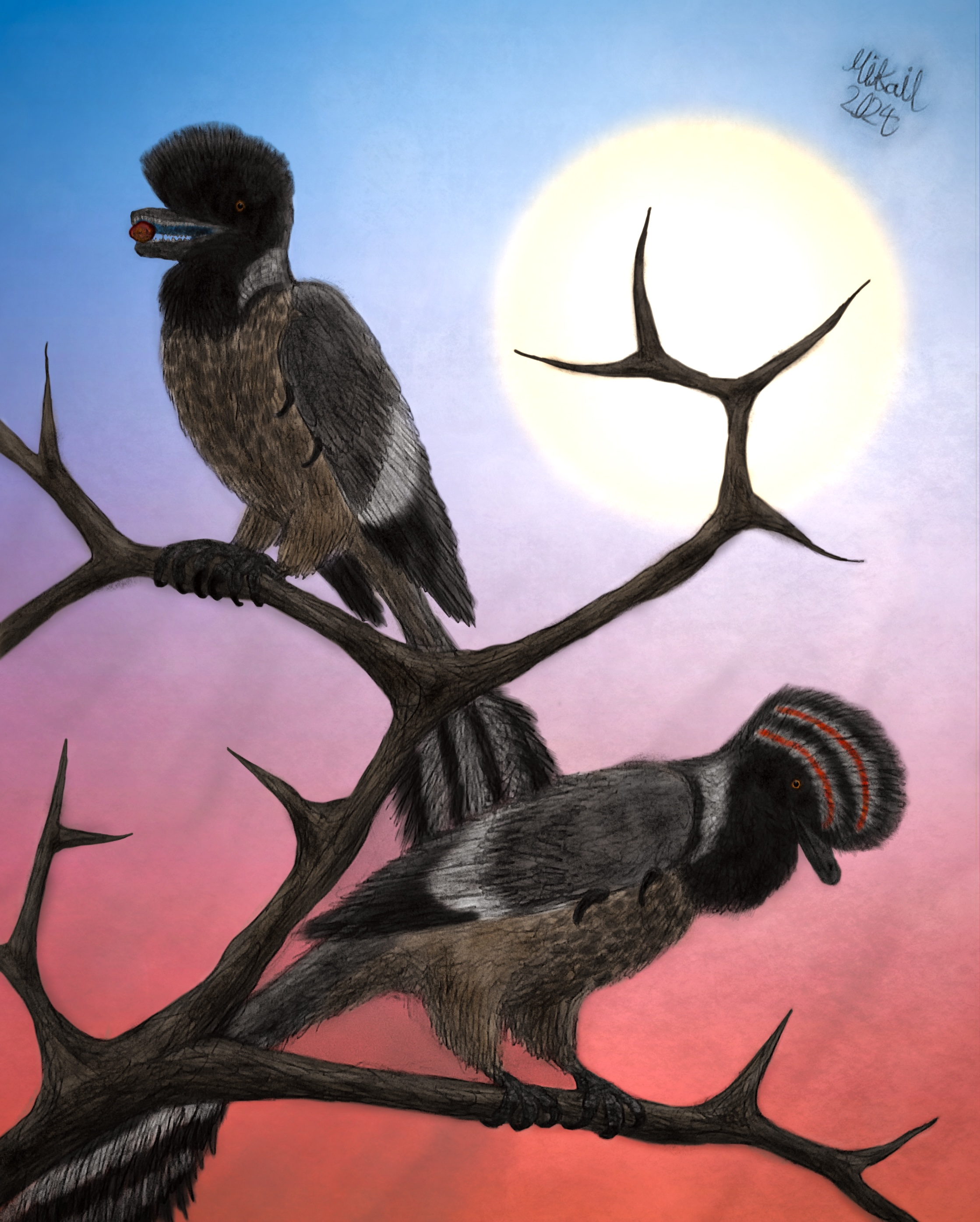
A speculative restoration of two Rahonavis (hypothetically-depicted male & female) on a charred branch.

Although numerous artists' reconstructions of Rahonavis show it in flight, it is not clear that it could fly; there has even been some doubt that the forearm material, which includes the quill knobs, belongs with the rest of the skeleton. Some researchers have suggested that Rahonavis represents a chimera consisting of the forelimb of a bird conflated with the skeleton of a dromaeosaurid, and consider Rahona as described a nomen dubium. The nearby discovery of the primitive bird Vorona berivotrensis at least shows that the possibility of a mix-up cannot be fully excluded. However, many other scientists, including the original describers of Rahonavis, maintain that its remains belong to a single animal, citing the close proximity of the wing bones to the rest of the skeleton. All the bones attributed to Rahonavis were buried in an area "smaller than a letter-sized page", according to co-describer Luis M. Chiappe in his 2007 book Glorified Dinosaurs. Additionally, Chiappe argued that suggestions of a chimera by paleornithologist Larry Martin were based on Martin's misinterpretation of the wing and shoulder bones as being more advanced than they really are.

Chiappe maintained that Rahonavis could probably fly, noting that its ulna was large and robust compared to Archaeopteryx, and that this fact, coupled with the prominent quill knobs, suggest that Rahonavis had larger and more powerful wings than that earlier bird. Additionally, Rahonavis shoulder bones show evidence of ligament attachments allowing the independent mobility needed for flapping flight. Chiappe concluded that Rahonavis was capable of flight, though it would have been more "clumsy in the air than modern birds." Agnolín and Novas (2013) noted that, like Microraptor, a bat-like flightstroke using the deltoideus complexes seems to have been likely in R. ostromi.

== See also ==
- Timeline of dromaeosaurid research
