= Maevarano Formation =

Late Cretaceous sedimentary rock formation found in Madagascar

- Stratigraphic range: Maastrichtian; ~70–66 Ma
- Type: Geological formation
- Sub-units: Masorobe, Anembalemba & Miadana Members
- Underlies: Berivotra Formation
- Overlies: Marovoay Beds
- Thickness: >105 m (344 ft)

Lithology
- Primary: Sandstone
- Other: Claystone, siltstone

Location
- Coordinates: 15.9°S 46.6°E
- Approximate paleocoordinates: 30.1°S 38.4°E
- Region: Mahajanga Province
- Country: Madagascar
- Extent: Mahajanga Basin

Type section
- Named for: Maevarano River
- Named by: Salètes
- Year defined: 1895
- Maevarano Formation (Madagascar)

The Maevarano Formation is a Late Cretaceous sedimentary rock formation found in the Mahajanga Province of northwestern Madagascar. It is most likely Maastrichtian in age, and records a seasonal, semiarid environment with rivers that had greatly varying discharges. Notable animal fossils recovered include the theropod dinosaur Majungasaurus, the early bird Vorona, the paravian Rahonavis, the titanosaurian sauropod Rapetosaurus, and the giant frog Beelzebufo.

== Description ==
The Maevarano Formation is well exposed in the Mahajanga Basin, in particular near the village of Berivotra near the northwestern coast of the island where its outcrops have been heavily dissected by erosion. At the time it was being deposited, its latitude was between 30°S and 25°S as Madagascar drifted northward after splitting from India about 88 million years ago. It is composed of three smaller units or members. The lowest is the Masorobe Member, which is usually reddish and is at least 80 metres (260 ft). Its rocks are mostly poorly sorted coarse-grained sandstones with some finer-grained beds. It is separated by an erosional disconformity from the next member, the Anembalemba Member. The lower portion of the Anembalemba Member is fine to coarse clay-rich sandstone, whitish or light grey in color, with cross-bedding. The upper portion of this member is made of poorly sorted clay-rich sandstone, light olive-grey in color, that lacks cross-bedding. Most vertebrate fossils come from the Anembalemba Member, especially from the upper portion. The Miadana Member, the third and uppermost member, is not always present, and is up to 25 metres (82 ft) in some places. Elsewhere, it is replaced by the marine Berivotra Formation. The Miadana Member is made up of claystone, siltstone, and sandstone, lacks cross-bedding, and has several colors of rock. The Maevarano Formation as a whole is underlain by the Marovoay beds and capped by the Berivotra Formation.

The age of the Maevarano Formation has been debated; the Berivotra Formation, which is partially contemporaneous with the upper portions of the formation, shows that at least the upper part of the Maevarano is Maastrichtian in age. There is no evidence that it is Campanian, despite previous reports to that effect. The Berivotra Formation appears to include near its top a magnetic reversal, interpreted as the shift from Chron 30N to Chron 29R, which occurred approximately 65.8 million years ago (about 300,000 years before the Cretaceous–Paleogene boundary and associated Cretaceous–Paleogene extinction event. This suggests that Maevarano organisms also lived shortly before (geologically speaking) the extinction event.

== History of exploration ==
The Maevarano Formation was first explored by French military physician Dr. Félix Salètes and his staff officer Landillon in 1895, and fossils and geologic data were sent to paleontologist Charles Depéret. He briefly described the formation and named two dinosaurs from the remains (Titanosaurus madagascariensis and Megalosaurus crenatissimus, now Majungasaurus). Similar collections were made throughout the 20th century, yielding mostly fragmentary fossils; one such specimen, a rough partial skull roof, became the holotype of supposed pachycephalosaur (bonehead dinosaur) Majungatholus in 1979. (This specimen was later shown to be part of the skull ornamentation of a Majungasaurus.) Large-scale expeditions (seven to date), under the banner of the Mahajanga Basin Project, began in 1993. These expeditions, conducted jointly by Stony Brook University and the University of Antananarivo, have greatly expanded knowledge of this formation and the organisms that lived while it was being deposited.

== Paleoenvironment ==
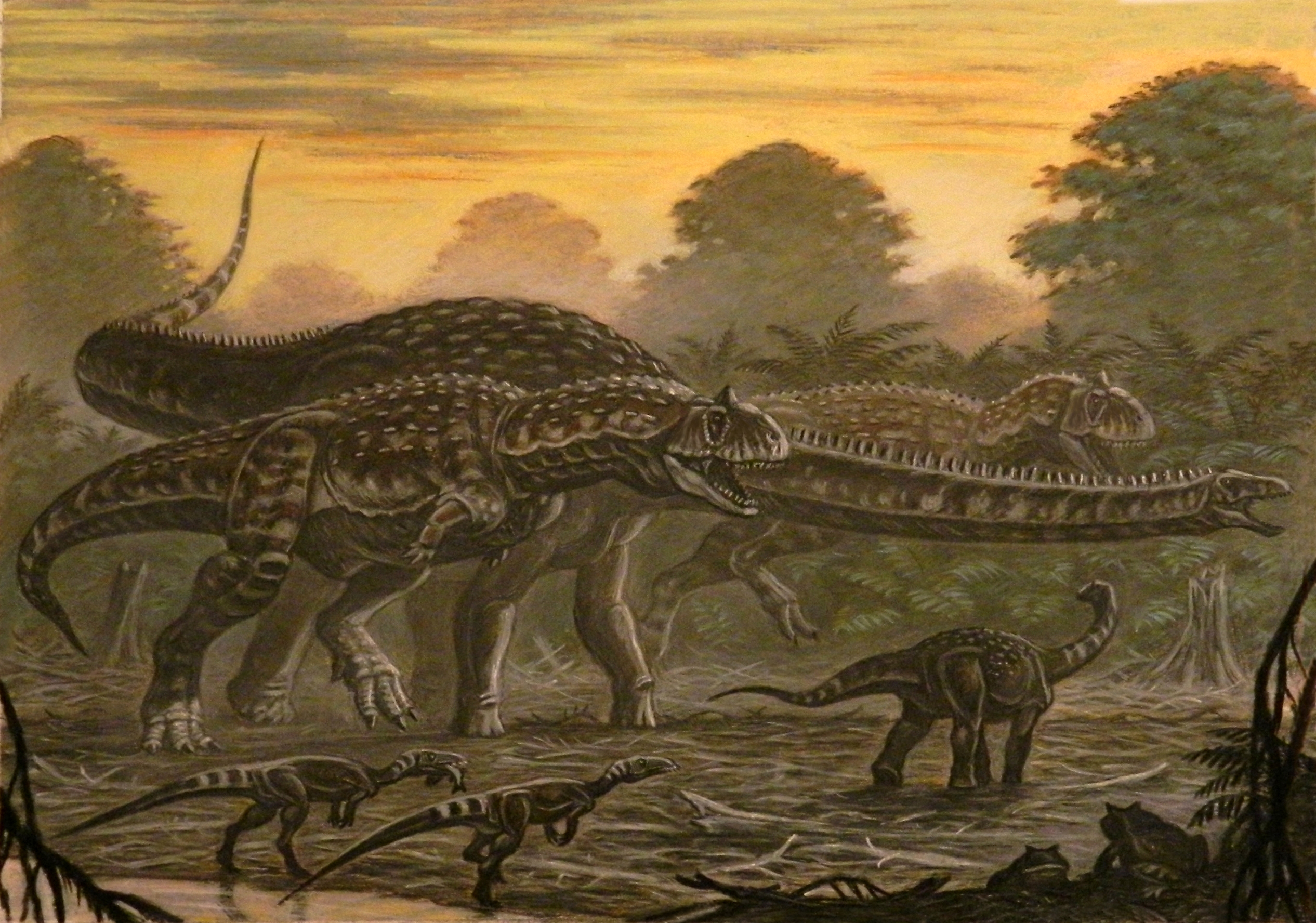
The interpretation of Majungasaurus, Masiakasaurus and Rapetosaurus during the late Cretaceous

The Maevarano Formation is interpreted as a low-relief alluvial plain that over time was covered by a marine transgression. Broad, shallow rivers flowed to the northwest from central highlands; evidence for debris flows suggests that the discharges of the rivers varied greatly, with periods of dilute water flow, and periods of rapid erosion dumping sediment into the channels. Paleosols are reddish and include root casts. The paleosols and other sedimentologic evidence indicate well-drained floodplains with abundant vegetation adapted to a relatively dry climate, strongly seasonal (rainy and dry seasons) and at times semiarid (not unlike the present climate of the area).

== Fossil content ==
Animals found in the formation include frogs (including Beelzebufo ampinga), turtles, snakes, lizards, at least seven species of crocodyliforms (including species of Mahajangasuchus and Miadanasuchus), abelisaurid theropod Majungasaurus, noasaurid Masiakasaurus, two types of titanosaurian sauropods (Rapetosaurus and Vahiny), and at least five species of bird-like dinosaurs, including Rahonavis. The 6 to 7 metres (20 to 23 ft) long Majungasaurus was likely the apex predator in the terrestrial environment. Crocodyliforms were very diverse and abundant.

Color key: Taxon / Reclassified taxon / Taxon falsely reported as present / Dubious taxon or junior synonym / Ichnotaxon / Ootaxon / Morphotaxon

Notes
Uncertain or tentative taxa are in small text
~~crossed out~~ taxa are discredited.

=== Invertebrates ===
Invertebrates
Genus	Species	Location	Stratigraphic position	Material	Notes	Images
Cubiculum	C. ornatus			Ovoid chambers in dinosaur bones	A trace fossil, possibly puppal chambers of carrion beetles	
Ethmosestheria	E. mahajangaensis		Anembalemba Member		A species of antronstheriid clam shrimp	
Osteocallis	O. mandibulus			Curved grooves on dinosaur bones	A trace fossil, possibly feeding marks by a similar insect as Cubiculum ornatus	

=== Fish ===
==== Osteichthyes ====
Osteichthyes
Taxon	Species	Location	Stratigraphic position	Material	Notes	Images
Albula	A. sp.			Tooth plates and dentaries	A species of bonefish	
Characiformes indet.	Indeterminate			Partial jaw		
Coelodus	C. sp.			A tooth plate	A species of pycnodontid	
Cypriniformes? indet.	Indeterminate					
Dipnoi indet.	Indeterminate		Masorobe and Anembalemba Members	Burrows		
Egertonia	E. sp.			Partial toothplates		
Enchodus	E. sp.			Teeth		
Lepisosteus	L. sp.			Scales, fin rays, teeth, vertebrae, skull bones	A type of gar	
Paralbula	P. sp.		Lac Kinkony Member	Partial tooth plates	A species of bonefish	
Polypteridae indet.	Indeterminate		Anembalemba and Lac Kinkony members	Skull bones, teeth, vertebrae, finlet spines, and scales		
Sciaenidae indet.	Indeterminate				A species of croaker	
Siluriformes indet.	Indeterminate			Vertebrae	A type of catfish	
Vango	V. fahiny		Lac Kinkony Member	Referred material is hyomandibulae, although other partial remains of gonorynchiform probably belongs to this taxa as well	A chanid gonorynchiform, milkfish	

=== Amphibians ===
Amphibians
Genus	Species	Location	Stratigraphic position	Material	Notes	Images
Beelzebufo	Beelzebufo ampinga	locality MAD98-25			A large frog	

=== Dinosaurs ===
Indeterminate Lithostrotia remains formerly attributed to Titanosauridae. Undescribed Lithostrotia form. Indeterminate Enantiornithes remains. A rich avifauna with several undescribed taxa are known, including pengornithid enantiornithes and putative omnivoropterygids.

==== Ornithischians ====
Ornithischians of the Maevarano Formation
Genus	Species	Location	Stratigraphic position	Material	Notes	Images
Stegosaurus	S. madagascariensis			"Teeth"	An indeterminate thyreophoran.	
Parankylosauria Indet.	Indeterminate				A parankylosaur	

==== Sauropods ====
Sauropods of the Maevarano Formation
Genus	Species	Location	Stratigraphic position	Material	Notes	Images
Rapetosaurus	R. krausei			"[Three] skulls, at least [one] postcranial skeleton."	A titanosaur	
Titanosaurus	T. madagascariensis					
Vahiny	V. depereti			"Partial braincase"	A titanosaur	

==== Theropods ====
Theropods of the Maevarano Formation
Genus	Species	Location	Stratigraphic position	Material	Notes	Images
Falcatakely	F. forsterae			"Partial skull"	A member of Enantiornithes	
Majungasaurus	M. crenatissimus			"Scattered remains leading to nearly most of the animal."	An abelisaur	
Masiakasaurus	M. knopfleri			"Disarticulated remains of at least 6 individuals," as well as other isolated fossils.	A noasaurid abelisaur	
Rahonavis	R. ostromi			"Partial postcranial skeleton"	A paravian of unclear phylogenetic placement	
Vorona	V. berivotrensis			"Partial hindlimbs"	An ornithuromorph	

=== Crocodylomorphs ===
Crocodylomorphs
Genus	Species	Location	Stratigraphic position	Material	Notes	Images
Mahajangasuchus	M. insignis			disarticulated postcranial skeleton, multiple skull remains	A mahajangasuchid	
Miadanasuchus	M. oblita				A peirosaurid. Formerly known as Trematochampsa oblita	
Simosuchus	S. clarki			multiple specimens representing most of the skeleton	A ziphosuchian	
Araripesuchus	A. tsangatsangana		Anembalemba Member	multiple specimen including several skulls and one almost complete specimen	A notosuchian	

=== Squamates ===
Squamates
Genus	Species	Location	Stratigraphic position	Material	Notes	Images
Adinophis	A. fisaka				A madtsoiid snake	
Indophis	I. fanambinana				A nigerophiid snake	
Kelyophis	K. hechti				A nigerophiid snake	
Konkasaurus	K. mahalana				A gerrhosaurid lizard	
Madtsoia	M. madagascariensis				A madtsoiid snake	
Menarana	M. nosymena			Vertebrae and rib fragments	A madtsoiid snake	

=== Turtles ===
Turtles
Genus	Species	Location	Stratigraphic position	Material	Notes	Images
Kinkonychelys	K. rogersi				A side-necked turtle	
Sahonachelys	S. mailakavava				A sahonachelyid side-necked turtle	
Sokatra	S. antitra				A sahonachelyid side-necked turtle	

=== Mammals ===
Mammal remains include an undescribed gondwanathere, a broken tooth UA 8699, which has been interpreted both as metatherian and as eutherian, a non-gondwanathere multituberculate tooth fragment, a non-gondwanathere multituberculate femur, and a yet undescribed mammal known from an articulated skeleton. Some taxa are particularly large sized herbivores, exemplifying the diversity of Mesozoic mammals.

Mammals
Genus	Species	Location	Stratigraphic position	Material	Notes	Images
Adalatherium	A. hui			A nearly-complete skeleton	A gondwanatherian	
Lavanify	L. miolaka			Multiple teeth and dentition	A gondwanatherian	
Vintana	V. sertichi				A gondwanatherian	

== See also ==
- Lists of fossiliferous stratigraphic units in Africa
  - List of fossiliferous stratigraphic units in Madagascar
- Geology of Madagascar
