= Berivotra Formation =

Geological formation in Madagascar

- Stratigraphic range: Maastrichtian
- Type: Geological formation
- Underlies: Betsiboka Limestone
- Overlies: Maevarano Formation

Lithology
- Primary: Siltstone, Marl

Location
- Coordinates: 15.9°S 46.6°E
- Approximate paleocoordinates: 30.1°S 38.4°E
- Region: Boeny, Mahajanga Province
- Country: Madagascar
- Extent: Mahajanga Basin

Type section
- Named for: Berivotra, Marovoay
- Location of the formation in Madagascar

The Berivotra Formation is a Maastrichtian sedimentary formation of the Mahajanga Basin in Boeny, Madagascar. It underlies the Danian Betsiboka Limestone, and is underlain (and partially coeval to) the Maevarano Formation.

The tan and yellow claystones and marls of the formation were deposited along a shallow marine shelf that evolved slowly from a clastic-dominated to carbonate-dominated depositional environment. Whilst the fluvial sandstones of the Maevarano represent terrestrial, freshwater, and lacustrine environments, the Berivotra preserves the marine environment offshore, and many fossils of marine invertebrates (brachiopods, bryozoans, sea urchins, bivalves, and gastropods) are known.

Many shark and ray teeth were collected by surface prospecting on outcrops of the Berivotra Formation, as have fossils of the frog Beelzebufo, which is also known from the Maevarano Formation. Vertebral centra of bony fish are also known from the Berivotra.

== Fossil content ==
The following fossils have been reported from the formation:

- Beelzebufo ampinga
- Cretolamna appendiculata, C. maroccana
- Serratolamna serrata
- Squalicorax kaupi, S. pristodontus
- Carcharias sp.
- Parapalaeobates sp.
- Pristiophorus sp.
- cf. Brachyrhizodus sp.

== See also ==
- List of fossiliferous stratigraphic units in Madagascar
- Geology of Madagascar
