= Vorona =

Vorona Temporal range: Late Cretaceous, Maastrichtian

Scientific classification
- Kingdom: Animalia
- Phylum: Chordata
- Class: Reptilia
- Clade: Dinosauria
- Clade: Saurischia
- Clade: Theropoda
- Clade: Avialae
- Clade: Ornithothoraces
- Genus: †Vorona; Forster et al., 1996
- Species: †V. berivotrensis

Binomial name
- †Vorona berivotrensis Forster et al., 1996

Extinct genus of dinosaur

Vorona (/ˈvʊəruːnə/ VOOR-oo-nə; lit. 'bird') is an extinct genus of bird known from outcrops of the Late Cretaceous (Maastrichtian age) Maevarano Formation near the village of Berivotra in Mahajanga Province, Madagascar. The genus contains a single species, Vorona berivotrensis, known from scattered hindlimb remains, possibly from a single individual (UA 8651 and FMNH PA715). The genus name is a Malagasy word for "bird", and the specific name, berivotrensis, references the village near the type locality.

The phylogenetic affinity of Vorona is hard to determine due to the fragmentary nature of the remains, mainly because the fossil shows a mix of basal avian features as well as some that seem very derived. Vorona might be a primitive ornithuromorph. Some studies have recovered it as an enantiornithean.
