= Catherine Forster =

American paleontologist

- Education: University of Minnesota, University of Pennsylvania, University of Chicago
- Known for: Dinosaur-bird evolution theories
- Scientific career
- Fields: Paleontology
- Workplaces: George Washington University

Catherine Ann Forster is an American paleontologist, taxonomist and expert in ornithopod evolution and Triceratops taxonomy. She is a Professor in the Geological Sciences Program and the Department of Biological Sciences at George Washington University. She obtained a B.A. and B.S. from the University of Minnesota in 1982, followed by an M.Sc. in 1985 and a Ph.D. in 1990 from the University of Pennsylvania. She then completed post-doctoral work at the University of Chicago between 1990 and 1994 in their department of Organismal Biology. She is known in part for unique bird fossils she and her colleagues have found and described from Madagascar.
