= Antusuchus =

Antusuchus Temporal range: Albian ~111–106 Ma

Scientific classification
- Kingdom: Animalia
- Phylum: Chordata
- Class: Reptilia
- Clade: Pseudosuchia
- Clade: Crocodylomorpha
- Clade: †Notosuchia
- Family: †Peirosauridae
- Genus: †Antusuchus; Fernández-Dumont et al., 2026
- Species: †A. rionegrinus

Binomial name
- †Antusuchus rionegrinus Fernández-Dumont et al., 2026

Extinct genus of reptiles

Antusuchus is an extinct genus of peirosaurid notosuchian from the Early Cretaceous (Albian) Candeleros Formation of Argentina. Phylogenetic analysis suggests that it may have been the most basal member of the family Peirosauridae. Despite this the animal shows a mix of features intermediate between peirosaurids and other notosuchians. It has also been noted for its small size, with a skull length of 11.5 cm (4.5 in), making it only about half as large as the previously smallest-known peirosaurid Montealtosuchus. It's blade-like and serrated teeth indicate that it was a carnivore while the discovery of two individuals in close proximity may suggest that it could have been a social animal.

== History and naming ==
Antusuchus is known from two individuals that were found in close proximity of each other in the sediments of the Cenomanian Candeleros Formation, specifically the La Buitrera Paleontological Area of Rio Negro Province. The holotype specimen, MPCA PV 1294, consists of an articulated skull and lower jaw while the second individual, MPCA PV 1295, is represented by the middle to posterior parts of a skull. A number of vertebrae have also been discovered around the two specimens, but cannot be attributed to either one specifically.

The name Antusuchus, like that of many other fossil crocodylomorphs, incorporates the latinized Greek word "suchus" (from "souchos"), itself derived from the Egyptian deity Sobek. The first part of the name meanwhile comes from the Mapudungún word for "sun". The species name reflects the region the fossils were found in, the Rio Negro Province of Argentina, located in northern Patagonia.

== Description ==
Although it is not entirely clear whether or not the known individuals of Antusuchus were fully mature or only subadults, the known material suggests that it may have been the smallest peirosaurid yet discovered. The skull length has been estimated to be approximately 11.5 cm (4.5 in). This is only approximately 20 - 40% the length of what is seen in other peirosaurids, which generally range between 30–50 cm (12–20 in). Even the previously smallest known peirosaurid, Montealtosuchus, has a skull around twice as long as that of known Antusuchus specimens. This overall agrees more with a body-size comparable to what is seen with uruguaysuchids rather than other peirosaurids.

== Phylogeny ==
Phylogenetic analyses conducted by Fernández-Dumont and colleagues consistently suggest that Antusuchus was the basalmost member of the family Peirosauridae, branching off from the group even before Hamadasuchus. Even in phylogenies that weighed more heavily against homoplasy, resulting in Hamdasuchus as the earliest-branching form, Antusuchus was still recovered as the next-most basal.

- - Peirosauria
    - Itasuchidae
      - Stolokrosuchus
      - - Itasuchus
        - Pepesuchus
    - - Mahajangasuchidae
        - Kaprosuchus
        - Mahajangasuchus
      - Peirosauridae
        - Antusuchus
        - - Hamadasuchus
          - - Gasparinisuchus
            - Lomasuchus
            - - Montealtosuchus
              - - Uberabasuchus
                - - Miadanasuchus
                  - - Colhuehuapisuchus
                    - Kostensuchus

== Evolutionary significance ==
The anatomy, phylogenetic position and provenance of Antusuchus are all considered to have significant implications for the evolutionary history of Peirosauridae. Anatomically Fernández-Dumont and colleagues describe the taxon as appearing like an intermediate between classical peirosaurids and other notosuchians. The overall outline of the rostrum and skull proportions for instance bear closer resemblance to members of the family Uruguaysuchidae rather than derived peirosaurids. The fact that it is nonetheless consistently found to be an early member of Peirosauridae may suggest that the group initially showcased a much more diverse range of skull shapes than later forms would suggest, which may be supported by some poorly understood taxa like Pehuenchesuchus and Araripesuchus rattoides which could be interpreted as early peirosaurids as well. The size of Antusuchus likewise appears to have been closer to early notosuchians and uruguaysuchids, with the skull being only half the size of the previously known-smallest peirosaurid Montealtosuchus. The fact that Antusuchus hails from the Cenomanian of Patagonia furthermore supports the idea that peirosaurids were already well established across Gondwana prior to the breakup of the landmass into South America and Africa.

== Paleobiology ==
Antusuchus is one of multiple known crocodylomorphs from the Candeleros Formation, which together fill a variety of different nisches. Among these Antusuchus has been interpreted as a carnivore, bearing blade-like teeth with serrated edges. Araripesuchus manzanensis meanwhile has been interpreted as a durophage owing to its bulbous cheek with their flat surfaces bearing mamelons, which make them ideal for processing hard-shelled food items. Meanwhile another species of Araripesuchus, Araripesuchus buitreraensis, appears to be more of a generalist, lacking adaptations specific to either carnivory or durophagy. The discovery of two Antusuchus individuals in close proximity may also suggest that like some uruguaysuchids, including Araripesuchus, Antusuchus may have been a social animal, possibly living in groups.

The Candeleros Formation preserves a range of depositional environments across its exposure. Antusuchus is specifically known from the La Buitrera locality of the La Buitrera Paleontological Area, which contains multipole sites that are interpreted to be wind-influenced dryland fluvian environments. During the time of Antusuchus this region was inhabited by large dinosaurs like carcharodontosaurids and titanosaurs and a number of smaller animals known from well-preserved fossils. This includes dromaeosaurids, thyreophorans, alvarezsaurs, rhynchocephalians, a pterosaur and more.
