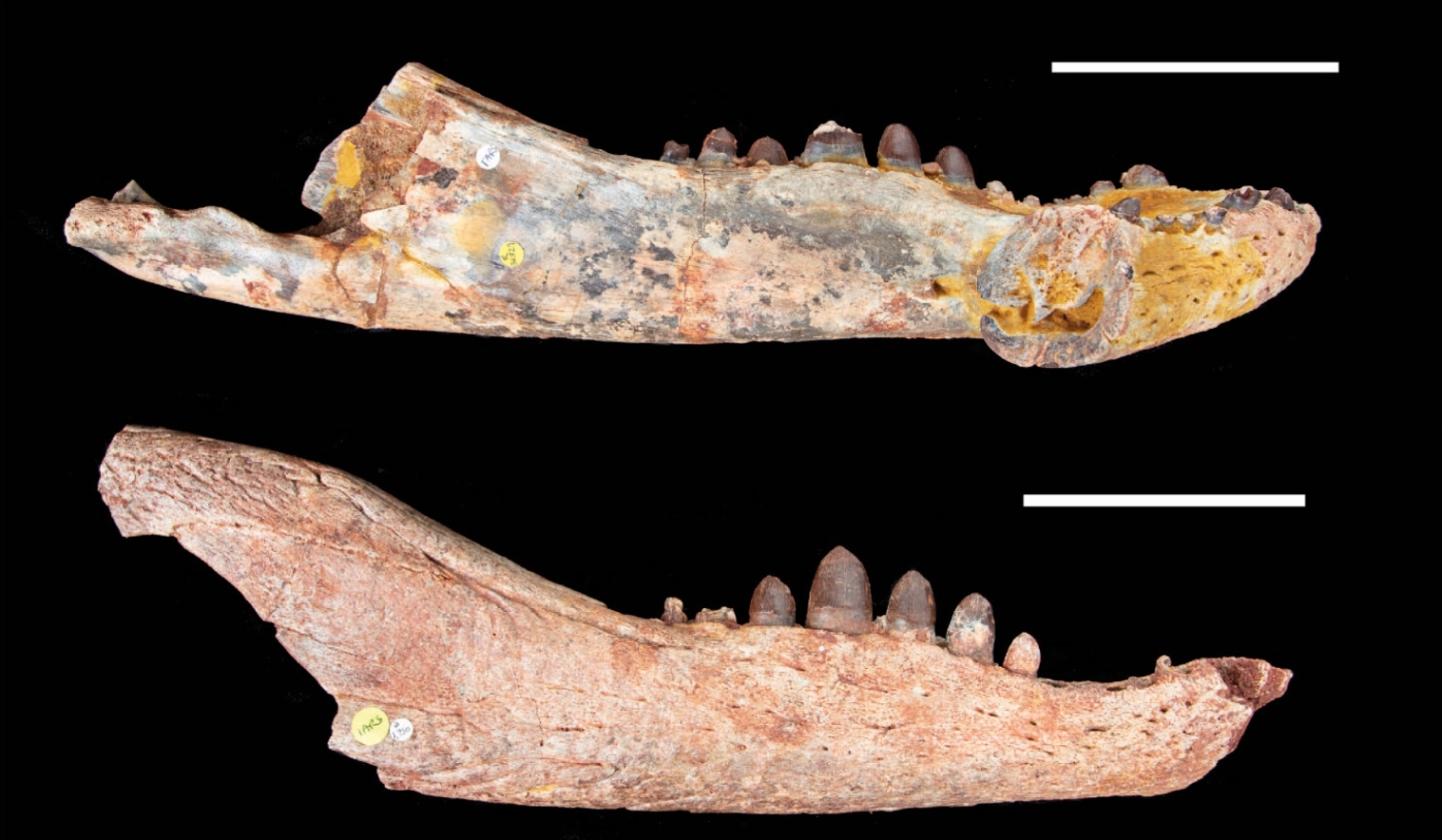
- Known material of Antaeusuchus taouzensis

Scientific classification
- Kingdom: Animalia
- Phylum: Chordata
- Class: Reptilia
- Clade: Pseudosuchia
- Clade: Crocodylomorpha
- Clade: †Notosuchia
- Family: †Peirosauridae
- Genus: †Antaeusuchus; Nicholl et al., 2021

Type species
- †Antaeusuchus taouzensis Nicholl et al., 2021

= Antaeusuchus =

Antaeusuchus Temporal range: Cenomanian, 100 Ma

Genus of extinct animals

Antaeusuchus taouzensis is a species of peirosaurid notosuchian from the Late Cretaceous Kem Kem Group of Morocco. It was described in 2021, and it is the only species in the genus Antaeusuchus. It is the fourth notosuchian described from the region and the second Kem Kem peirosaurid after Hamadasuchus. A 2023 study proposes that Antaeusuchus may not be distinct enough to warrant its own genus and that it instead represents another species of Hamadasuchus.

== Discovery and naming ==
Antaeusuchus is known from two specimens: the holotype NHMUK PV R36829, consisting of paired mandibles, and the paratype NHMUK PV R36874, a partial right mandible. Both specimens were commercially collected and recovered from unspecified beds of the Kem Kem Group near Jebel Beg'aa, Taouz township in the Errachidia Province of Morocco. Both fossils are preserved without distortion and in good condition, with damage mostly restricted to the teeth. While the two were originally described as representing a distinct genus of peirosaurid, a later publication by Pochat-Cottilloux et al. suggests that although distinct on a species level, the material is not unique enough to be placed in its own genus. They suggest that Antaeusuchus could simply represent an additional species of Hamadasuchus, while further proposing that the paratype specimen is more similar to the already established Hamadasuchus species.

The generic name derives from Antaeus, a giant from Greek and Berber mythology said to be buried in northern Morocco and the Ancient Greek σοῦχος, soukhos meaning crocodile. The species name refers to the township Taouz where both specimens had been found.

== Description ==
The anterior region of the mandible is characterized by a broad U-shaped symphysis. Each mandibular ramus diverges at an 22° angle from the midline and remains mostly straight for most its preserved length, curving slightly medially towards the fossil's posterior. The anterior of the dorsal margin of the mandible is characterized by two 'waves', the first of which spanning the dentary teeth 1 to 6. The second wave rises from the 9th to 15th tooth. These 'waves' reach their peak at the 4th and 13th dentary tooth respectively. Other than a series of foramina adjacent to the tooth row, this part of the bone shows little ornamentation. The holotype dentary preserves 18 alveoli, the first 16 of which preserving partial or complete teeth, all of which are closely spaced. The posterior half of the dorsal margin remains largely straight and is strongly sloping. The mandibular fenestra is not fully preserved in either specimen, but can be inferred to be large in size and anteroventrally-posterodorsally elongated.

The first alveoli are circular in shape, suggesting the anterior teeth to be roughly conical while from the 10th dentary alveoli onward become more labiolingually compressed, more extreme flattening is present at the anterior and posterior margin of the preserved teeth. These margins are adorned with denticulated carinae which form the cutting edge of the teeth. These denticles are small in size and show no significant variation in size.

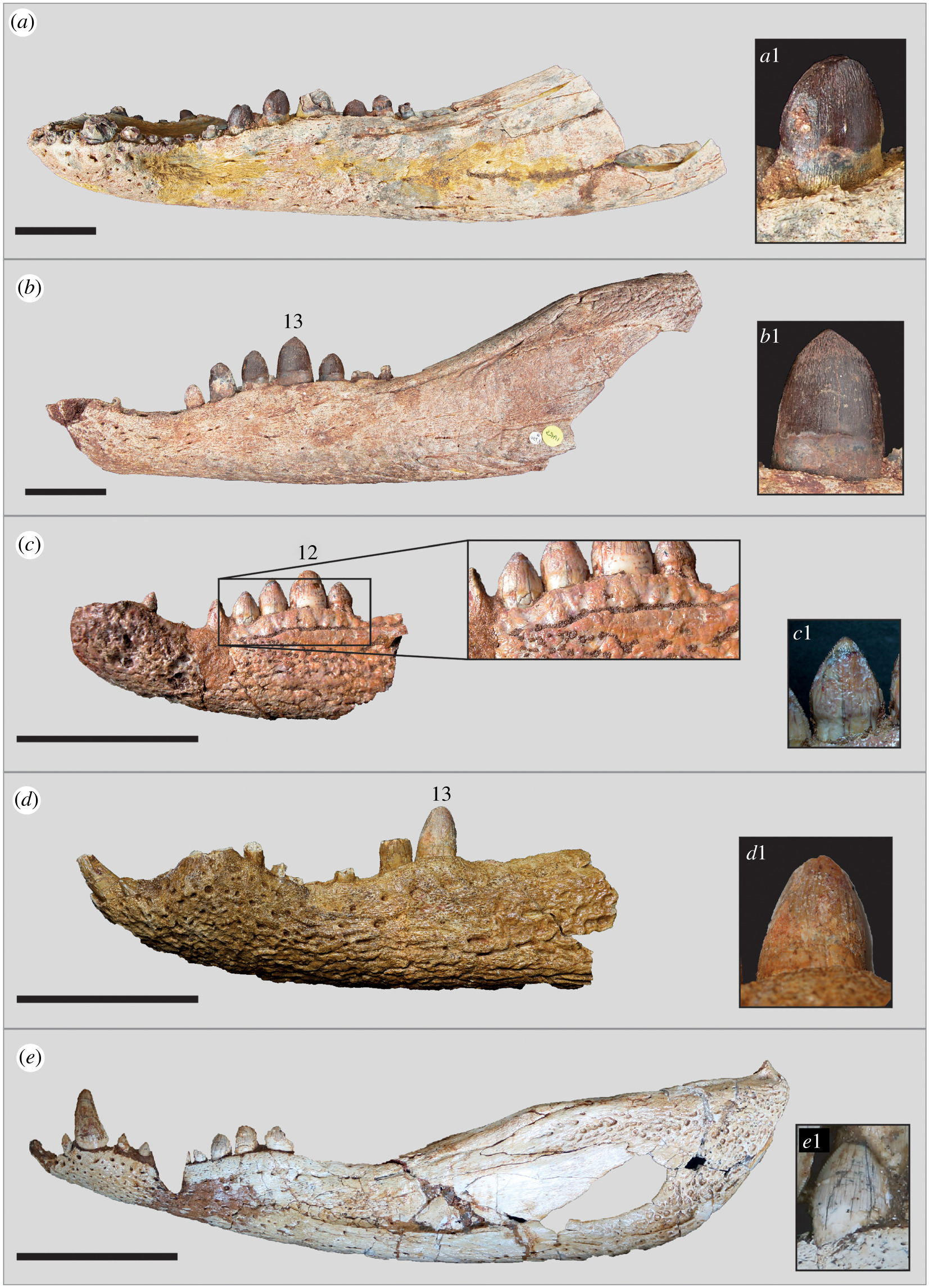
Comparison of the holotype (a) and paratype (b) of Antaeusuchus with three specimens of Hamadasuchus (c-e)

In Antaeusuchus, the mandibular rami diverge at a much broader angle (43 to 44°) than in Hamadasuchus (between 20 and 30° depending on the specimen), meaning that it had a broader rostrum than its relative. While this trait is considered diagnostic by Nicholl et al., Yohan Pochat-Cottilloux and colleagues argue that this might actually be ontogenetic, meaning it changed with age. This could mean that only older individuals developed such broad jaws. The surface of the mandible in Antaeusuchus is covered in shallow pits and groves different from the deeper ornamentation of Hamadasuchus. The posterior teeth of the Hamadasuchus holotype are lanceolate in shape, which is not seen in Antaeusuchus. Furthermore the teeth of the Antaeusuchus holotype, while slightly pointed at their apices, they are not comparable to the almost triangular teeth seen in the holotype of Hamadasuchus. The 10th to 14th teeth in referred specimen NHMUK PV R36874 are angular, but their anterior and posterior margin run parallel for most of their length and only converge to a point at the apex of the crown.

Antaeusuchus was significantly larger than Hamadasuchus, almost twice the size of the later. While size is not a distinguishing character on its own, it adds to the already present morphological differences between the two genera. Furthermore, Nicholl et al. argue that the features present in Antaeusuchus are not compatible with the ontogenetic series known for Hamadasuchus, which already includes specimen presumed to be 'adult'.

== Phylogeny ==
For the phylogenetic analysis both specimens were combined as one operational taxonomic unit and inserted into a character-taxon matrix based on that of Pol et al. 2014. This matrix was subsequently used as a basis for multiple further studies running parallel to one another, resulting in numerous 'daughter' matrices, which were united for the phylogeny of Nicholl et al. 2021. The sampling was also expanded by the inclusion of the putative peirosaurids Rukwasuchus yajabalijekundu from Tanzania and Miadanasuchus oblita from Madagascar. The resulting strict consensus tree under equal weighting of characters can be seen below:

- - Mahajangasuchidae
    - Kaprosuchus
    - Mahajangasuchus
  - Peirosauridae
    - Stolokrosuchus
    - - - Bayomesasuchus
        - - Hamadasuchus
          - Antaeusuchus
      - - - Miadanasuchus
          - Barrosasuchus
        - - Gasparinisuchus
          - Rukwasuchus
          - - Uberabasuchus
            - - Lomasuchus
              - Montealtosuchus

The resulting phylogeny recovered peirosaurids and mahajangasuchids grouping together, forming a sister clade to uruguaysuchids. Internally, Antaeusuchus was recovered as a sister taxon to Hamadasuchus from the Kem Kem Group, the two taxa clade together with Bayomesasuchus as their sister, which in turn forms a sister clade to all other peirosaurids. Peirosaurus torminni was not included in the analysis, however its close relative Uberabasuchus terrificus has been consistently recovered as a close relative or possible junior synonym, consequently Uberabasuchus was used to serve as a proxy for Peirosaurus.
