= Barrosasuchus =

Barrosasuchus Temporal range: Santonian, 86.3–83.6 Ma

Scientific classification
- Kingdom: Animalia
- Phylum: Chordata
- Class: Reptilia
- Clade: Pseudosuchia
- Clade: Crocodylomorpha
- Clade: †Notosuchia
- Family: †Peirosauridae
- Genus: †Barrosasuchus; Coria et al., 2018

Type species
- †Barrosasuchus neuquenianus Coria et al., 2018

Extinct genus of reptiles

Barrosasuchus is a genus of peirosaurid notosuchian from the Santonian of Argentina and part of the extensive peirosaurid record of Late Cretaceous Patagonia. It contains one species, Barrosasuchus neuquenianus. B. neuquenianus is known from an almost complete skull and the majority of the articulated postcranial skeleton, making it the best preserved Patagonian peirosaurid.

== Discovery and naming ==
In February 2001 the Museo Carmen Funes conducted a joint expedition with the Royal Tyrell Museum at the Sierra Barrosa Locality, 30 km north-east of Plaza Huincul, Neuquén province. There the team uncovered the bones of dinosaurs and mammals, bird footprints and notably a nearly complete peirosaurid fossil from the Bajo de la Carpa Formation. The holotype, MCF-PV 413, was found lying on its ventral side, the skull articulated with the remaining skeleton which consisted of both forelimbs, most of the vertebral column up to the sacrals, one hindlimb and semi-articulate osteoderms that obscured parts of the fossil. The fossil was subsequently prepared in this state, keeping the elements in position.

The generic name derives from the Sierra Barrosa locality where the fossils have been found and the Ancient Greek: σοῦχος, romanized: souchos, (soukhos) meaning crocodile. The species epithet refers to the Neuquén Province.

== Description ==
The skull of Barrosasuchus is nearly complete, articulated with the lower jaw and the cervical vertebrae and measures a total of 315 mm, slightly smaller than the specimens known from Lomasuchus and Gasparinisuchus. Parts the dorsal surface of the skull has been subject to erosion, notably most of the skull table and the dorsal surface of the occipital area as well as patches of the skull anterior to the orbits. The entire skull is tubular in shape and moderately wide, heavily ornamented with pits and grooves of varying arrangement and density. The orbits are subcircular and face dorsolaterally, each orbit is topped by a heavily ornamented anterior palpebral bone. The premaxilla is short and high with a prominent notch between it and the maxilla. It is unclear if a septum separating the anterior-facing external nares was present. As in other peirosaurs, a knob-like structure can be found on the anterior contour of the premaxillary symphysis. The maxilla is mediolaterally wide with a straight ventral age and laterally almost vertical. The maxilla's relationship to the lacrimal and prefrontal bones is uncertain due to the erosion that has affected this area of the skull. Due to damage the exact number of teeth is also unknown, however it is estimated that Barrosasuchus may have had up to 13 maxillary teeth (10 of which were preserved) on each side of the skull in addition to 4 teeth on each premaxilla. Both mandibular rami are preserved and more slender laterally than that of Uberabasuchus with a smaller mandibular fenestra. The anterior part of the mandible is dorsoventrally compressed with a slightly concave dorsal margin. Dorsally the symphysial suture has a conspicuous foramen at its mid-point that serves an unknown purpose, but serves as one of Barrosasuchus autapomorphies. The teeth of the dentary are closely spaced and sigmoidal is seen in dorsal view. Following the first 3 procumbent teeth comes the 4th tooth, which is the largest of the lower jaw. Following it the teeth decrease in size until the 8th, at which point dental size increases again up to the 13th dentary tooth. The dentaries preserve 16 and 17 teeth respectively, with a total number of 18 teeth per dentary being suggested by Coria et al.

The last cervical vertebrae were found still in articulation with its corresponding cervical ribs, but the specimens preservation does not allow for a more detailed identification in the vertebral column. The vertebral centra are amphicoelous and shorter than they are wide. Each has a notch on the ventral border of the anterior articular surface and a distinct ventral keel. The shafts of the cervical ribs are short and overlap distally with the anterior projection of the following vertebra. Of the dorsal vertebrae only the anterior elements are unobscured and as the cervicals amphicoelous and short, however lack the ventral keel, at least 10 dorsal ribs are preserved on the left side. Of the pectoral girdle only the right coracoid is preserved and elongated and plate-like in shape. Both forearms are preserved with the left of which being almost complete. Of the hindlimbs the tibia and fibula are preserved in articulation with the pes.

3 types of osteoderms are preserved, rectangular, square and round, most of which are no longer articulated and scattered over the ventral side of the holotype, obscuring other elements of the fossil, however a small section of the posterior still preserves articulate ventral armor. The rectangular osteoderms have been interpreted as being part of the dorsal armor, possibly having formed parasagittal rows while some of the narrower osteoderms are associated with the cervical region. There is no indication that these osteoderms would have overlapped. The square and rounded osteoderms contacted each other and would have formed the ventral shield. Occasionally appearing rounded osteoderms may be associated with the lateral armor of the limbs.

== Phylogeny ==
The following phylogeny is a strict consensus tree under equal weighting of characters as published by Nicholl et al. in 2021. It is based on the character-taxon matrix of Pol et al. (2014), incorporating many of its daughter matrices that had been created parallel to one another into a single phylogenetic tree.

- - Mahajangasuchidae
    - Kaprosuchus
    - Mahajangasuchus
  - Peirosauridae
    - Stolokrosuchus
    - - - Bayomesasuchus
        - - Hamadasuchus
          - Antaeusuchus
      - - - Miadanasuchus
          - Barrosasuchus
        - - Gasparinisuchus
          - Rukwasuchus
          - - Uberabasuchus
            - - Lomasuchus
              - Montealtosuchus
