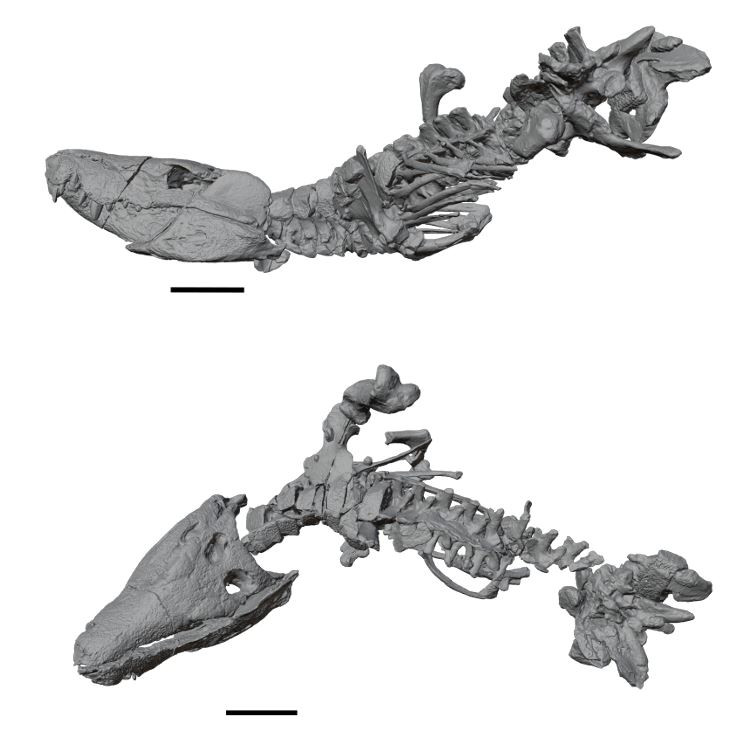
- Holotype specimen

Scientific classification
- Kingdom: Animalia
- Phylum: Chordata
- Class: Reptilia
- Clade: Pseudosuchia
- Clade: Crocodylomorpha
- Clade: †Notosuchia
- Family: †Peirosauridae
- Genus: †Kostensuchus; Novas et al., 2025
- Species: †K. atrox

Binomial name
- †Kostensuchus atrox Novas et al., 2025

= Kostensuchus =

Kostensuchus Temporal range: Late Cretaceous, Maastrichtian

Extinct genus of reptiles

Kostensuchus is an extinct genus of hypercarnivorous notosuchian crocodylomorphs belonging to the family Peirosauridae, known from the Late Cretaceous (Maastrichtian age) Chorrillo Formation of Argentina. The genus contains a single species, Kostensuchus atrox, known from a single well-preserved skeleton including an articulated skull and large parts of the postcranial skeleton. Kostensuchus has been recovered as part of a lineage of broad-snouted peirosaurids that are thought to have arisen towards the end of the Cretaceous from smaller, omnivorous ancestors. The animal's great size, robust head, and large, serrated teeth suggest that it was one of the apex predators of its ecosystem, likely feeding on medium-sized tetrapods like ornithischian dinosaurs. While Kostensuchus resembles the terrestrial baurusuchids in many aspects of its morphology, the hindlimbs appear to have assumed a more sprawling posture, which has been suggested to indicate a somewhat more semiaquatic lifestyle.

== History and naming ==
The fossil remains of Kostensuchus were discovered in rock layers of the Maastrichtian lower Chorrillo Formation in the Argentine province of Santa Cruz. The holotype and only known specimen, MPM-PV 23554, consists of a well-preserved and articulated skull and much of the postcrania, missing limb elements and the tail. This makes Kostensuchus one of the most complete known peirosaurids and the most complete robust representative of the group.

The generic name, Kostensuchus, derives in part from the Aonikenk word "kosten" for the Patagonian wind, as well as the Latinized Greek word "suchus", derived from the Egyptian deity Sebek (or Sobek). The specific name translates to "harsh" in Greek.

== Description ==
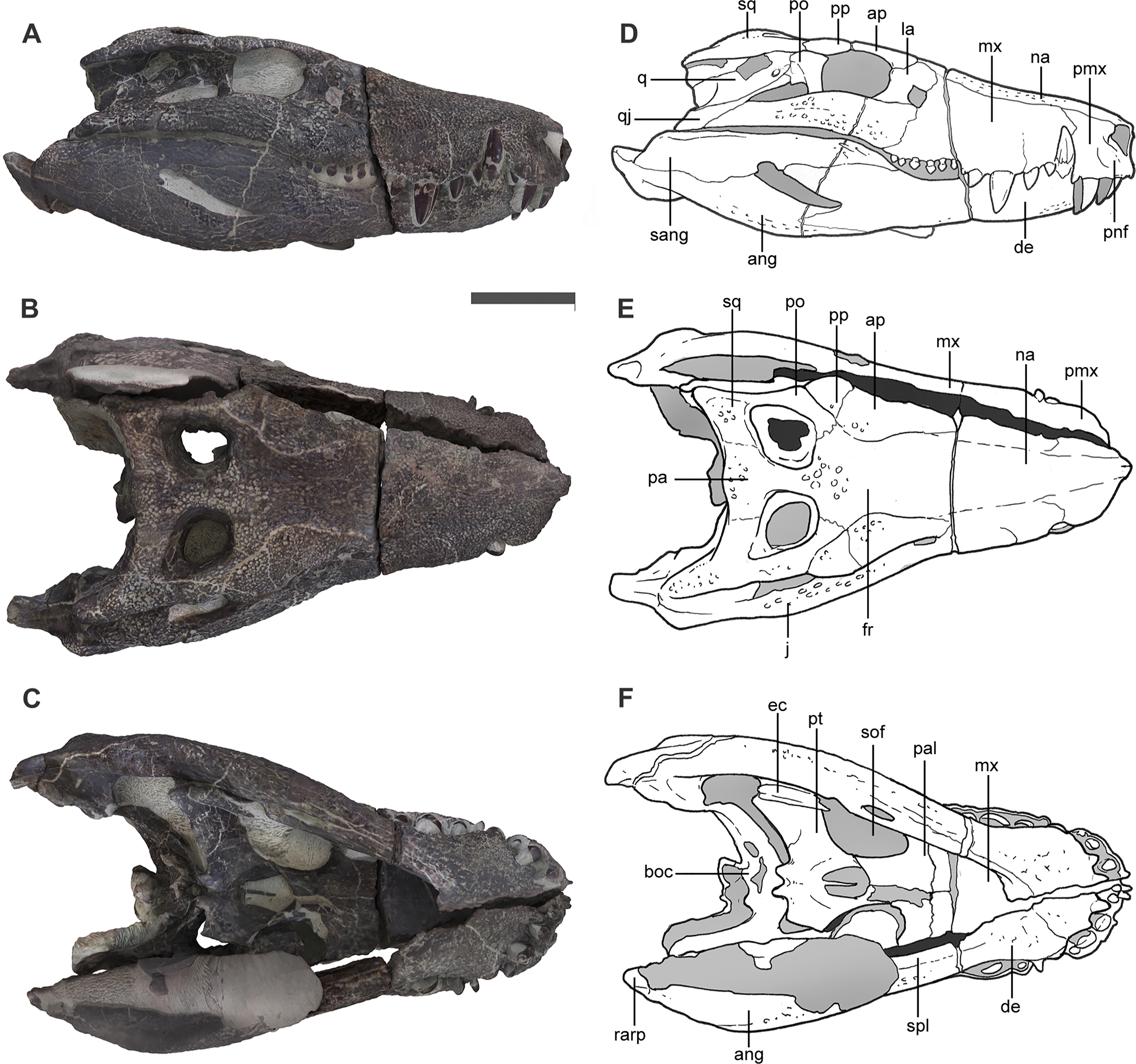
Kostensuchus (depicted) possessed the most robust skull of any known peirosaurid.

Kostensuchus has been noted for its large and robust skull. The great height of the snout means that, rather than tapering to a point as in Uberabasuchus, the snout maintains a rather straight dorsal profile, something also seen in Gasparinisuchus and Hamadasuchus. The skull is also rather wide when viewed from above, approximately as wide as it is tall, and Novas et al. describe it as trapezoidal in shape due to the abruptness of the snout's end. About half of the entire skull's width is made up by the snout, which is different from other peirosaurids including Uberabasuchus and Montealtosuchus, in which the snout makes up around 60% of the total skull length. The toothrow in the upper jaw is broken up by the presence of a prominent open notch in its side, which neatly separates the premaxillary from the maxillary teeth. When the jaws are closed, as is the case in the holotype skull as preserved, this notch serves to receive the enlarged fourth tooth of the lower jaw. This notch is also easily visible in dorsal view, as it constricts the snout just behind the bulging premaxilla.

The external nares are located towards the very tip of the snout, and their elliptical openings face anterolaterally, meaning towards the front and sides of the snout. Most of the edges of the nares are formed by the bulging premaxilla, which narrows towards the very tip of the snout to form a process that extends upward, separating the narial openings from one another and connecting to the tip of the nasal bones. While such a septum cannot be confidently identified in most peirosaurids due to preservation and is missing in most other notosuchians, it was definitely present in Uberabasuchus. The lower and rear edges of the nares are also surrounded by a perinarial fossa, which extends down towards the alveolar margin and in size and extent resembles the fossa seen in other peirosaurids and baurusuchids.

=== Dentition ===
The dentition of the upper jaw of Kostensuchus consists of five premaxillary teeth and at least ten maxillary teeth. While this is fewer than seen in other peirosaurids, it is still regarded as a generalized large tooth count. This also serves to clearly set Kostensuchus apart from baurusuchids, which, like sphagesaurids, have a much more reduced tooth count, with sometimes as few as only five maxillary teeth. Overall, the tooth morphology seen in Kostensuchus is similar to that of other peirosaurids, with the teeth of the upper jaw falling into one of two categories. Towards the front of the jaw, the teeth are described as conical and enlarged caniniforms, which eventually give way to posterior teeth that are more lanceolate in shape as well as overall smaller.

The premaxillary toothrow shows a clear increase in tooth size from the first to the fourth tooth. The first two are closely spaced and small and followed by a larger third tooth, itself followed by the fourth premaxillary tooth that is the largest of this set. The final premaxillary tooth, meanwhile, shows a decrease in size, being only half the height of the fourth. The premaxillary teeth are thoroughly separated from the maxillary teeth by a toothless notch that serves to receive the enlarged fourth dentary tooth of the lower jaw. Behind the gap, the maxillary teeth initially follow a similar pattern as those of the premaxilla, seeing a gradual increase in tooth size leading up to the third maxillary tooth, which in its dimensions is similar to the enlarged fourth dentary. All seven subsequent teeth are noticeably smaller, culminating in two low-crowned lanceolate teeth with more pronounced side-by-side compression at the very back of the toothrow.

The general pattern of tooth size distribution, featuring an enlarged premaxillary, maxillary, and dentary tooth, is similar to what is found in the distantly related but possibly ecologically similar members of the Baurusuchidae. This size variation is furthermore much greater in these forms than in any other notosuchians with the exceptions of outliers such as Kaprosuchus and Bretesuchus

Since the lower jaw is preserved in articulation with the upper jaw and closed, much less is known about the dentary teeth. The first two teeth are procumbent, meaning they were directed forward, something that among peirosaurs is only seen in Kostensuchus and Colhuehuapisuchus. Further back, the fourth dentary tooth is prominently enlarged, being about twice as long and high as any of the other teeth of the lower jaw and sliding neatly into the gap present in the upper jaw.

All teeth of Kostensuchus are described as possessing small symmetrical denticles along the cutting edges (carinae) of the teeth. This condition of serrated teeth is known as ziphodonty.

=== Size ===
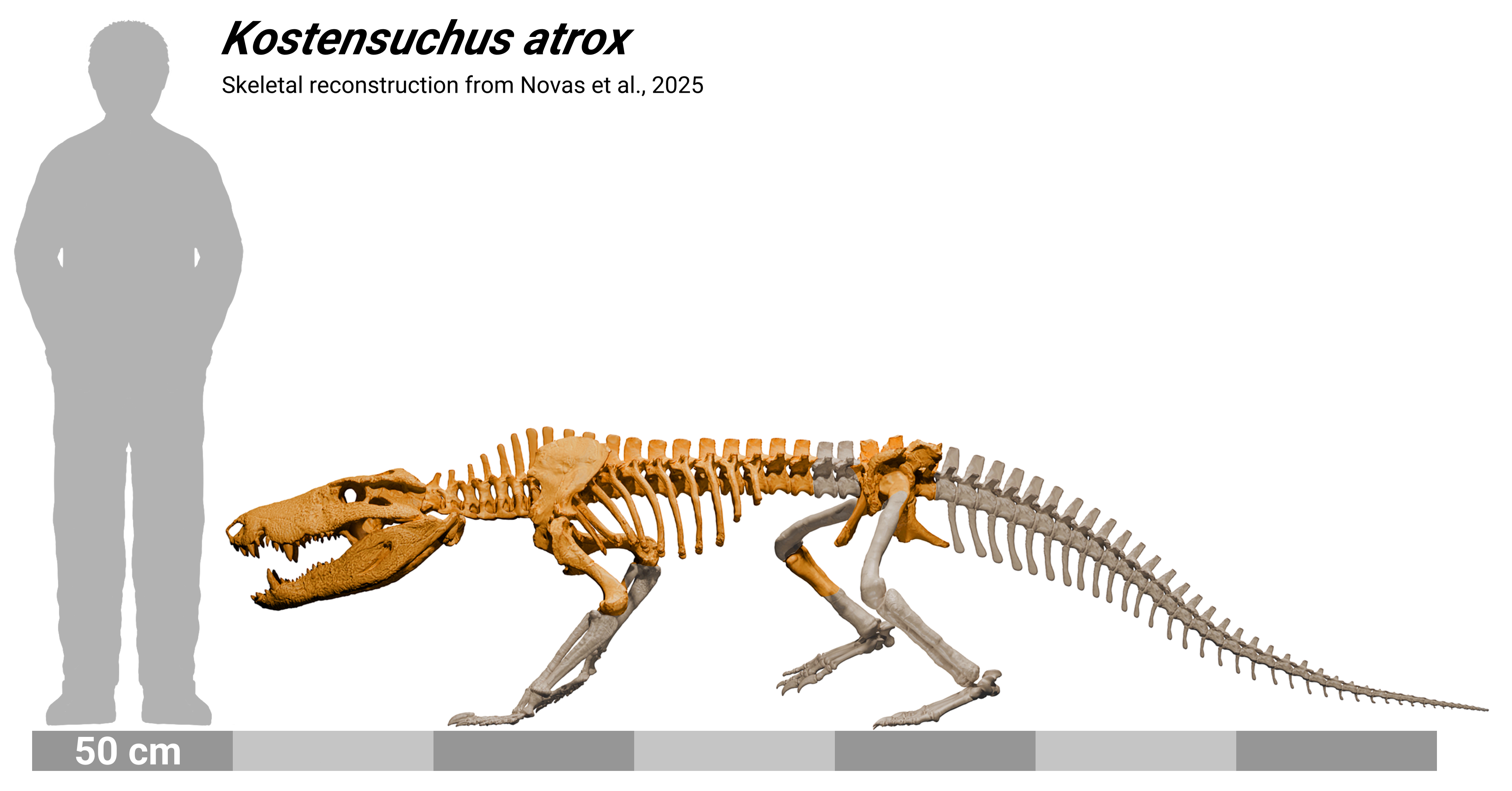
Skeletal reconstruction of Kostensuchus with the holotype material in yellow and unknown elements in gray (human for scale)

Kostensuchus is among the largest known peirosaurids and the largest for which extensive material has been found. Estimates suggest it may have reached a length of up to 3.5 m (11 ft) and a weight of perhaps 250 kg (550 lb). This makes Kostensuchus much larger than many older peirosaurids such as Montealtosuchus, Uberabasuchus, Lomasuchus, and Hamadasuchus, which are known to have ranged from 12–63 kg (26–139 lb). The dorsal skull length alone is 490 mm (19 in).

== Phylogeny ==
Kostensuchus has been confidently placed in the family Peirosauridae, an early diverging branch of the clade Notosuchia. In addition to confirming the monophyly of Peirosauridae, the phylogenetic analysis run by Novas and colleagues suggests the existence of a clade of broad-snouted peirosaurids previously known from mostly fragmentary fossil remains. Aside from Kostensuchus, this clade was found to include Miadanasuchus, Colhuehuapisuchus and Gasparinisuchus, with the latter two recovered as sister taxa. Kostensuchus was recovered as the sister taxon to this grouping, and Miadanasuchus as the basalmost member of this particular branch.

- Notosuchia
  - other notosuchians
  - - Uruguaysuchidae
    - Peirosauria
      - Mahajangasuchidae
      - Peirosauridae
        - Hamadasuchus
        - - Lomasuchus
          - - Uberabasuchus
            - - Montealtosuchus
              - - Miadanasuchus
                - - Kostensuchus
                  - - Gasparinisuchus
                    - Colhuehuapisuchus

'broad-snouted' clade

== Paleoecology ==
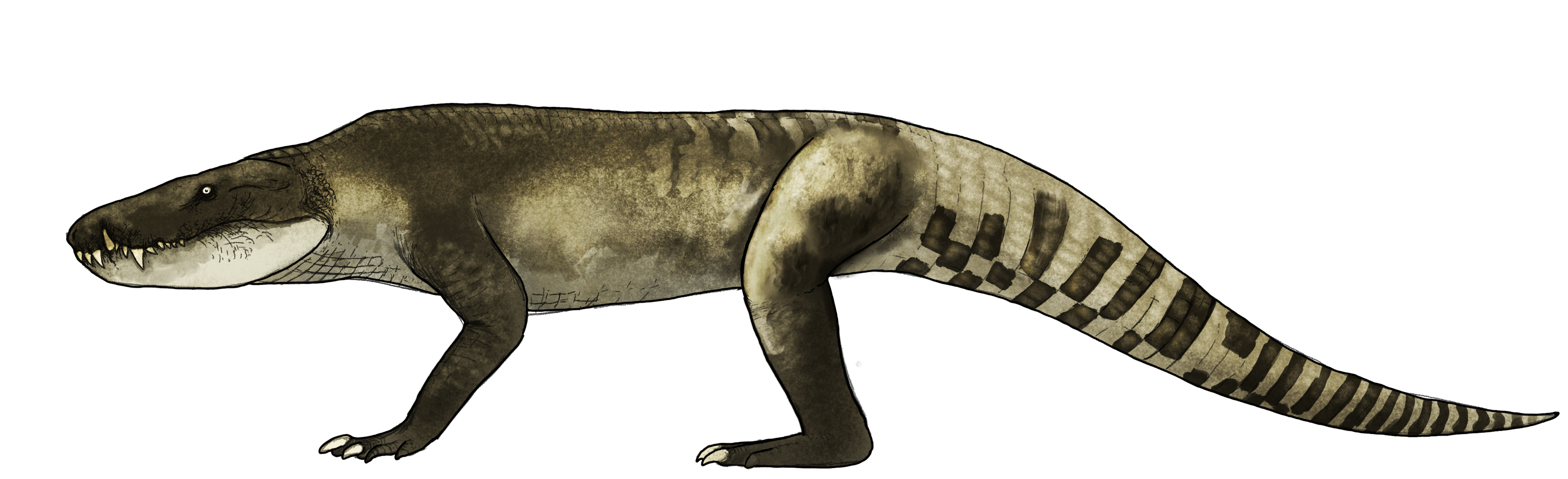
Speculative life restoration

Kostensuchus is the most complete and best preserved of what is interpreted as a monophyletic lineage of robust-bodied peirosaurids that had previously been known only from a few fragmentary remains. With an estimated length ranging from 2.7 m (8 ft 10 in) to 3.505 m (11.50 ft) and an estimated weight of around 250 kg (550 lb), Kostensuchus is the largest peirosaurid known from good remains and stands in stark contrast to the older narrow-snouted peirosaurids like Hamadasuchus and Uberabasuchus, which ranged between 12–63 kg (26–139 lb). This drastic increase in body size may be related to a transition from a more omnivorous ecology to that of hypercarnivorous apex predators. In addition to the animal's sheer size, such a lifestyle is supported by a variety of anatomical adaptations mainly related to the skull. The skull openings suggest the presence of large temporal musculature. The snout takes up about 50% of the skull length, and the dentition consists of broad teeth with serrated edges. This essentially creates lengthened shearing edges that may have been used to slice through the flesh of larger prey items. Similar hunting habits have also been proposed for the distantly related baurusuchids, which have similarly enlarged and serrated teeth as well as a similar dental pattern. However, the two groups differ in other aspects of their morphology; baurusuchids have proportionally narrower, deeper, and longer snouts with reduced dentition.

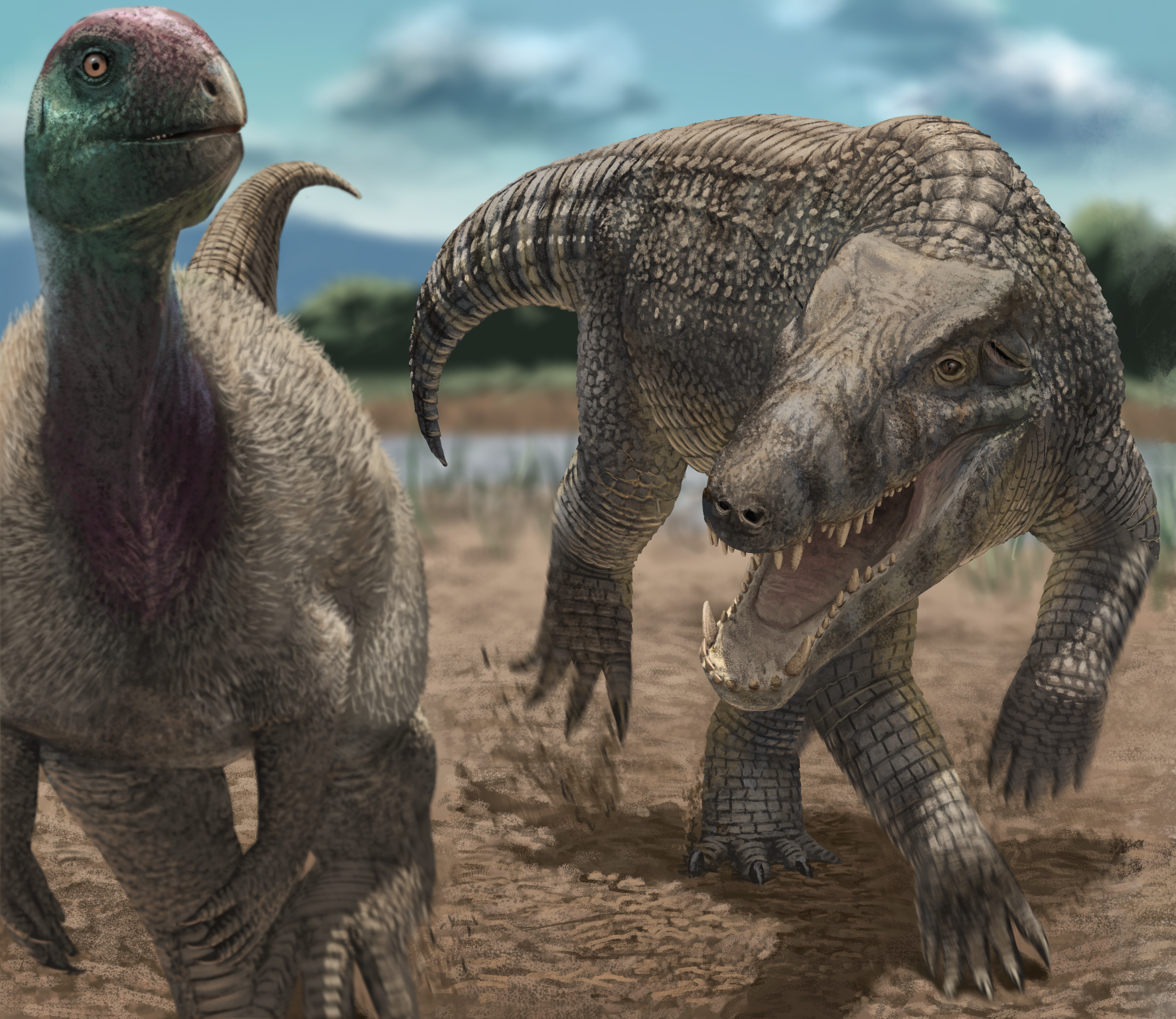
Hypothetical life reconstruction of Kostensuchus pursuing Isasicursor, a elasmarian ornithopod dinosaur also from the Chorrillo Formation

The postcranial skeleton may also provide clues to the animal's ecology. The forelimbs broadly resemble those of baurusuchids and feature an extended deltopectoral crest that could be related to the animal assuming an erect parasagittal posture, though it is also possible that the crests served as an attachment site for powerful limb muscles that could have been employed either in prey capture or carcass dismemberment. At the same time, the distal humerus is distinct from those of baurusuchids and even shares a feature with Sebecus. The anatomy of this region may suggest that Kostensuchus had a wider range of motion and more flexible limbs than baurusuchids. While less is known about the anatomy of the hindlimbs, the anatomy of the ilium suggests that the hindlimbs may have assumed a more sprawling posture compared to the erect parasagittal posture seen in baurusuchids. These differences match the idea that peirosaurids could have been more semiaquatic and are closely related to semiaquatic groups like mahajangasuchids and itasuchids, while baurusuchids are most frequently interpreted as terrestrial animals.

Regardless of the specifics, Kostensuchus would have been among the top predators of the Chorrillo Formation, which has been interpreted as preserving a temperate to warm, seasonally humid floodplain environment. The formation also preserves the fossil remains of the megaraptoran theropod dinosaur Maip, which would have been the top predator of the region. Kostensuchus likely used its large head, serrated teeth, and perhaps its powerful forelimbs to subdue and kill sizable prey, including mid-sized tetrapods like ornithischian dinosaurs, which in the Chorrillo Formation are represented by hadrosaurids and the elasmarian Isasicursor. Other animals of the formation include the titanosaur sauropod Nullotitan, the unenlagiid theropod Kank, some enantiornitheans, an indeterminate parankylosaur, and various early mammals including monotremes, gondwanatherians, meridiolestidans and therians.

The flora of the Chorrillo Formation is known primarily from pollen samples. Extinct conifers in the family Cheirolepidiaceae are known from the formation, which are primarily known from arid conditions and other areas supporting drought-resistant plant life. However, this is not necessarily the case for the Chorrillo Formation, as some members of the group are known from cool and humid localities. The paleoflora of the site implies a strongly seasonal ecosystem with relatively nutrient-poor soils. Some angiosperms are known from the formation but are uncommon. In other areas, wetland environments are represented, with a number of gastropods, both terrestrial and freshwater.
