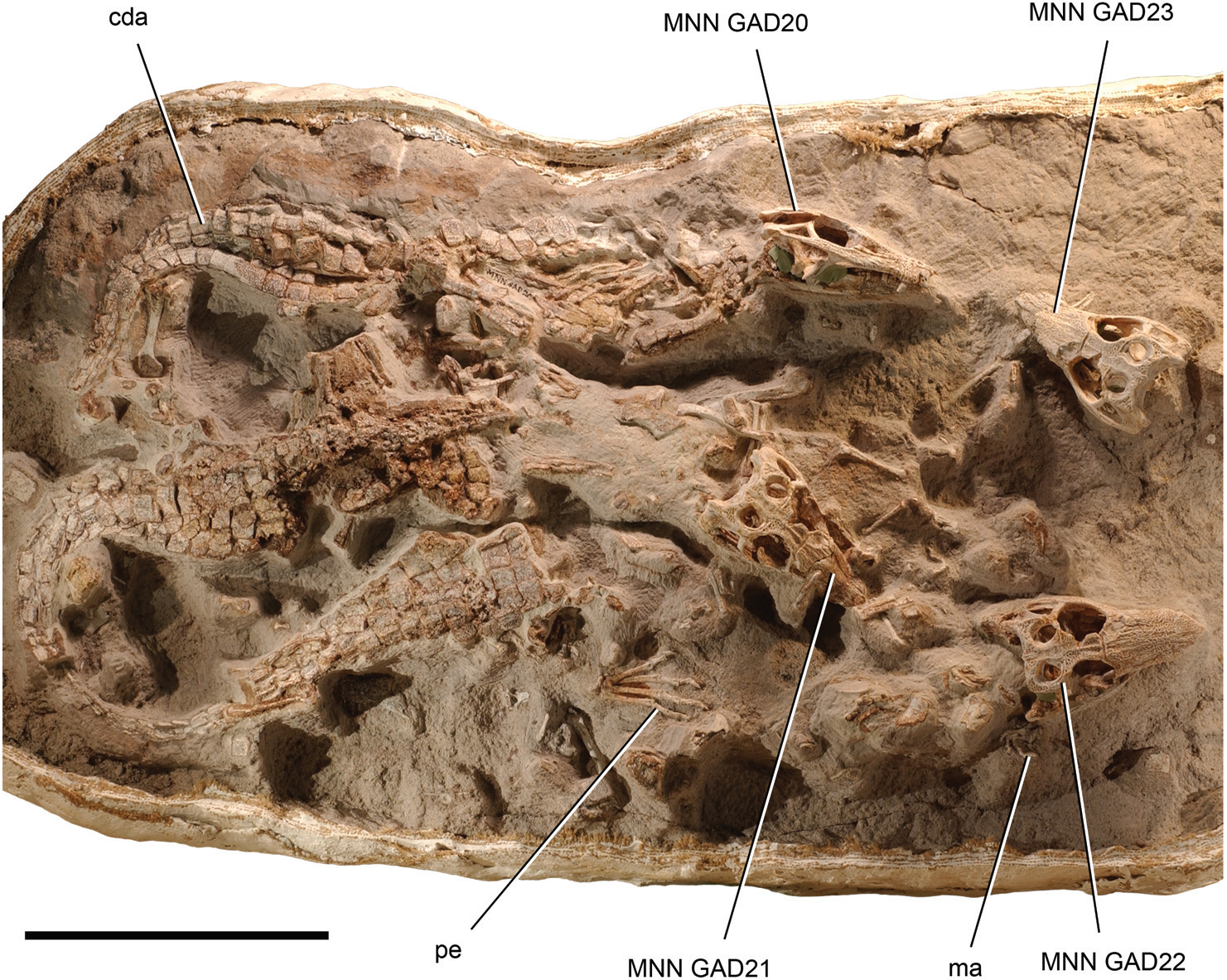
- Block containing multiple specimens of Araripesuchus wegeneri

Scientific classification
- Kingdom: Animalia
- Phylum: Chordata
- Class: Reptilia
- Clade: Pseudosuchia
- Clade: Crocodylomorpha
- Clade: †Notosuchia
- Family: †Uruguaysuchidae; Gasparini, 1971

Subgroups
- †Anatosuchus; †Araripesuchus; †Uruguaysuchus

= Uruguaysuchidae =

Uruguaysuchidae Temporal range: Early - Late Cretaceous, 125–66 Ma

Extinct family of reptiles

Uruguaysuchidae is a family of notosuchian crocodyliforms that lived in South America and Africa during the Cretaceous period. It was formally defined under the PhyloCode in 2024 as "the most inclusive clade containing Uruguaysuchus aznarezi but not Baurusuchus pachecoi, Peirosaurus torminni, Mahajangasuchus insignis, Notosuchus terrestris, and Crocodylus niloticus." Below is a modified cladogram that depicts the preferred reference phylogeny, chosen from Fernández Dumont et al. (2020):

- Notosuchia
  - - Uruguaysuchidae
      - Araripesuchus tsangatsangana
      - - Anatosuchus
        - Araripesuchus wegeneri
      - - Araripesuchus buitreraensis
        - - Araripesuchus gomesii
          - - Araripesuchus patagonicus
            - Uruguaysuchus
    - Peirosauridae
      - Stolokrosuchus
      - - - Kaprosuchus
          - Mahajangasuchus
        - - Hamadasuchus
          - - Gasparinisuchus
            - Lomasuchus
            - Uberabasuchus
            - Montealtosuchus
  - Ziphosuchia
    - Candidodon
    - - Libycosuchus
      - - Simosuchus
        - - Neuquensuchus
          - Pakasuchus
          - Malawisuchus
          - - Sphagesauria
              - Morrinhosuchus
              - Sphagesauridae
            - Sebecosuchia
