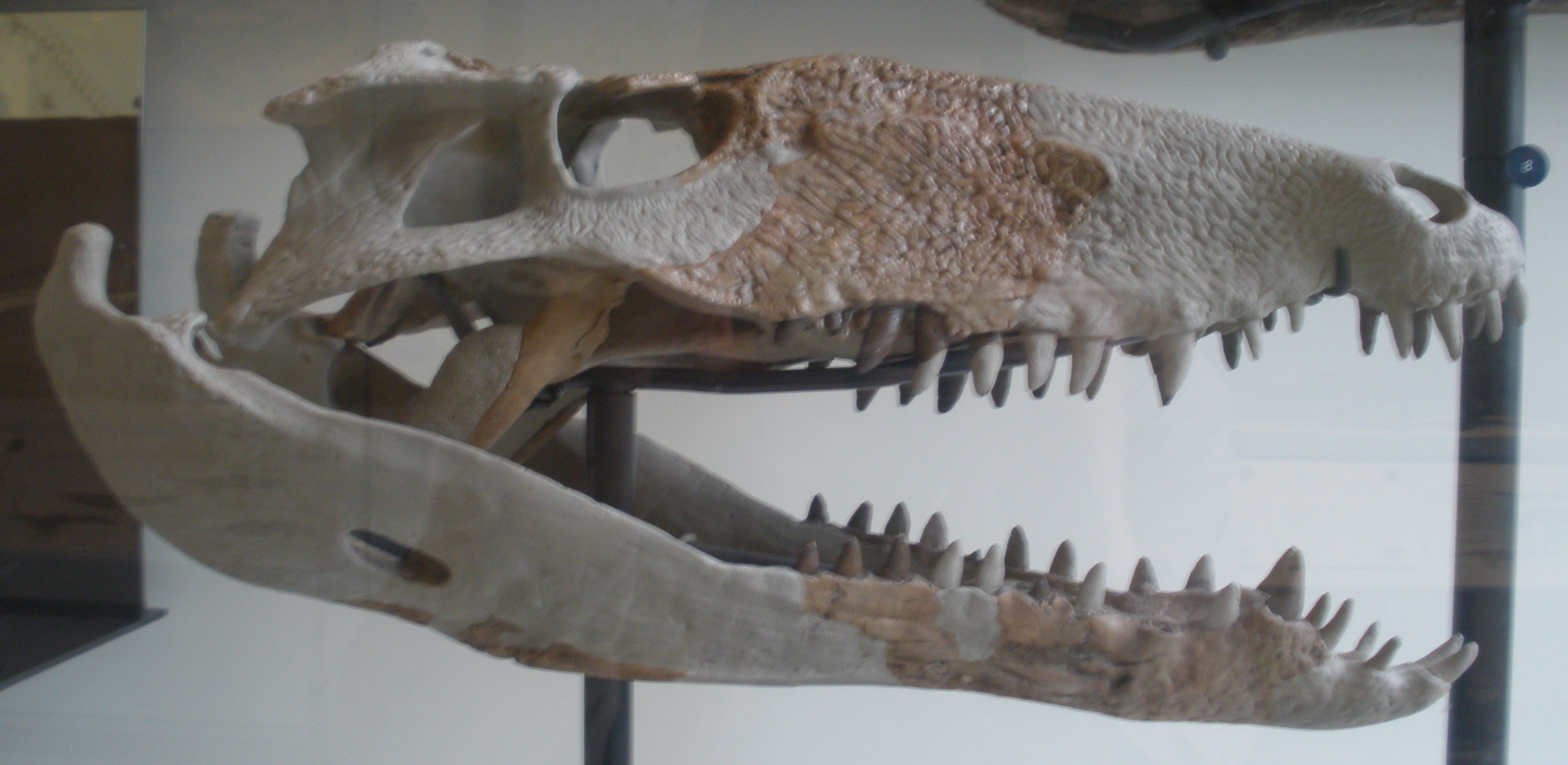
- Skull of Sebecus icaeorhinus

Scientific classification
- Kingdom: Animalia
- Phylum: Chordata
- Class: Reptilia
- Clade: Pseudosuchia
- Clade: Crocodylomorpha
- Clade: †Notosuchia
- Clade: †Sebecosuchia
- Clade: †Sebecia; Larsson and Sues, 2007

Families
- †Baharijodon; †Doratodon?; †Trematochampsa?; †Wanosuchus; †Peirosauridae; †Sebecidae

= Sebecia =

Sebecia Temporal range: Late Cretaceous - Late Miocene/Early Pliocene, 90–5 Ma

Extinct clade of reptiles

Sebecia is an extinct clade of mesoeucrocodylian crocodyliforms that includes peirosaurids and sebecids. It was first constructed in 2007 to include Hamadasuchus, Peirosauridae, and Sebecus. It was initially considered to be the sister taxon of the clade Neosuchia, which includes living crocodilians, although some later studies have placed it within Neosuchia as a basal clade. Sebecians were terrestrial crocodyliforms characterized by their deep snouts and ziphodont dentition. They first appeared in the Late Cretaceous, survived the Cretaceous–Paleogene extinction event, and became extinct in the Miocene or early Pliocene epoch, making them a highly successful and long-lived group.

According to paleontologists Hans Larsson and Hans-Dieter Sues, who constructed the clade in 2007, Sebecia also includes genera that were once assigned to Baurusuchidae, namely Pabwehshi. However, other baurusuchids, namely Baurusuchus, were placed outside Sebecia. Therefore, Baurusuchidae was considered polyphyletic and thus not a true clade. Juan Leardi and colleagues in 2024 defined Sebecia in the PhyloCode as "the most inclusive clade including Sebecus icaeorhinus and Lomasuchus palpebrosus, but not Baurusuchus pachecoi, Notosuchus terrestris, and Crocodylus niloticus". Below is the cladogram produced from Larsson and Sues' phylogenetic analysis:

- Metasuchia
  - Notosuchia
    - Notosuchus
    - Malawisuchus
  - - Araripesuchus
    - - - Baurusuchus
        - - Neosuchia
          - Sebecia
            - Pabwehshi
            - - Sebecidae
                - Sebecus
                - Bretesuchus
              - Peirosauridae

Larsson and Sues defined Sebecidae as all taxa more closely related to Sebecus than to Peirosaurus or Uberabasuchus, both of which are peirosaurids. They defined Peirosauridae as all taxa more closely related to Peirosaurus and Uberabasuchus than to Sebecus, which is a sebecid. This definition is problematic, especially in relation to later phylogenetic studies of crocodyliforms. Many of these studies have found sebecids to be derived members of a clade containing notosuchians, while finding peirosaurids to be basal neosuchians. If the definitions of these two families are applied to later phylogenetic analyses, Sebecidae would include all notosuchians and Peirosauridae would include all neosuchians.
