= Barcinosuchus =

Barcinosuchus Temporal range: Aptian-Albian ~125–100 Ma

Scientific classification
- Domain: Eukaryota
- Kingdom: Animalia
- Phylum: Chordata
- Class: Reptilia
- Clade: Archosauria
- Clade: Pseudosuchia
- Clade: Crocodylomorpha
- Clade: †Notosuchia
- Clade: †Sebecosuchia
- Clade: †Sebecia
- Family: †Peirosauridae
- Genus: †Barcinosuchus; Leardi & Pol 2009

Species
- †B. gradilis Leardi & Pol 2009 (type)

Extinct genus of reptiles

Barcinosuchus (meaning "Cerro Barcino Formation's crocodile") is an extinct genus of carnivorous metasuchian from the early Cretaceous period. It is a peirosaurid which lived during the early Cretaceous period (Aptian to Albian stage) in what is now Chubut Province, Argentina. It is known from the holotype MPEF-PV 3095, which consists of skull, mandible, and postcranial remains. The specimen recovered from the lower part of the Cerro Castaño Member of the Cerro Barcino Formation. Barcinosuchus was named by Martín Leardi and Diego Pol in 2009 and the type species is Barcinosuchus gradilis.
