= Bayomesasuchus =

Bayomesasuchus Temporal range: Turonian ~93.9 Ma

Scientific classification
- Kingdom: Animalia
- Phylum: Chordata
- Class: Reptilia
- Clade: Pseudosuchia
- Clade: Crocodylomorpha
- Clade: †Notosuchia
- Family: †Peirosauridae
- Genus: †Bayomesasuchus; Barrios et al. 2015

Type species
- †Bayomesasuchus hernandezi Barrios et al. 2015

Extinct genus of reptiles

Bayomesasuchus is an extinct genus of peirosaurid mesoeucrocodylian known from the early Late Cretaceous Cerro Lisandro Formation of Neuquén Province, western central Argentina. It contains a single species, Bayomesasuchus hernandezi. Even though it is known from relatively fragmentary remains, it represents one of the most basal peirosaurids.

== Discovery ==
Bayomesasuchus was first described and named by Francisco Barrios, Ariana Paulina-Carabajal and Paula Bona in 2015 and the type species is Bayomesasuchus hernandezi. The generic name refers to the Cero Bayo Mesa mountain, located in southeastern Neuquén Province of Argentina, where the holotype was found, and suchus, Latinized from the Greek souchos, an Egyptian crocodile god. Bayomesasuchus is known solely from its holotype, a fragmentary skull and mandible. It was collected form the Cerro Lisandro Formation which is the youngest formation within the Río Limay Subgroup, the lowest section of the Neuquén Group, dating to late Cenomanian to early Turonian of the early Late Cretaceous. The holotype of Bayomesasuchus is the most complete crocodyliform specimen recorded from the Cerro Lisandro Formation, and represents the fourth peirosaurid named from the Neuquén Group of Argentina, together with Lomasuchus palpebrosus and Patagosuchus anielensis from the overlying late Turonian to the early Coniacian Portezuelo Formation, and Gasparinisuchus peirosauroides from the even younger Santonian to early Campanian Bajo de la Carpa and Anacleto Formations.

== Phylogeny ==
A phylogenetic analysis of Crocodyliformes recovered Bayomesasuchus within Peirosauridae in a polytomy with the African peirosaurid Hamadasuchus rebouli and a clade formed by all other South American peirosaurids.
