= Colhuehuapisuchus =

Colhuehuapisuchus Temporal range: Late Cretaceous

Scientific classification
- Kingdom: Animalia
- Phylum: Chordata
- Class: Reptilia
- Clade: Pseudosuchia
- Clade: Crocodylomorpha
- Clade: †Notosuchia
- Family: †Peirosauridae
- Genus: †Colhuehuapisuchus; Lamanna et al. 2019
- Species: †C. lunai

Binomial name
- †Colhuehuapisuchus lunai Lamanna et al. 2019

Extinct genus of peirosaurid

Colhuehuapisuchus is an extinct genus of peirosaurid notosuchian known from the Late Cretaceous Lago Colhué Huapí Formation in Argentina. It contains a single species, Colhuehuapisuchus lunai. It is known from a single anterior end of a lower mandible. Its name comes from the formation its holotype was found, the Lago Colhué Huapí Formation along with the suffix -suchus, from Greek, which is often used as the suffix for crocodilians.

== Discovery ==
The holotype material was discovered on Ephemeral island (45°35′52”S, 68°37′20”W) close to the southeastern shore of Lago Colhué Huapi, approximately 35 km east of the town of Sarmiento, southern Chubut Province, Golfo San Jorge Basin, central Patagonia, Argentina

== Description ==
The anterior mandible is proportionately wider transversely than all other definite peirosaurids and its teeth were ziphodont and pseudoheterodont. Colhuehuapisuchus is hypothesized to have lived in semi arid environments like all other peirosaurids and is the youngest peirosaurid known from the fossil record to date, as well as the southern most peirosaurid, extending their geological range during the Cretaceous. According to novas, it was similar in size to Kostensuchus at 3-4 meters long.
