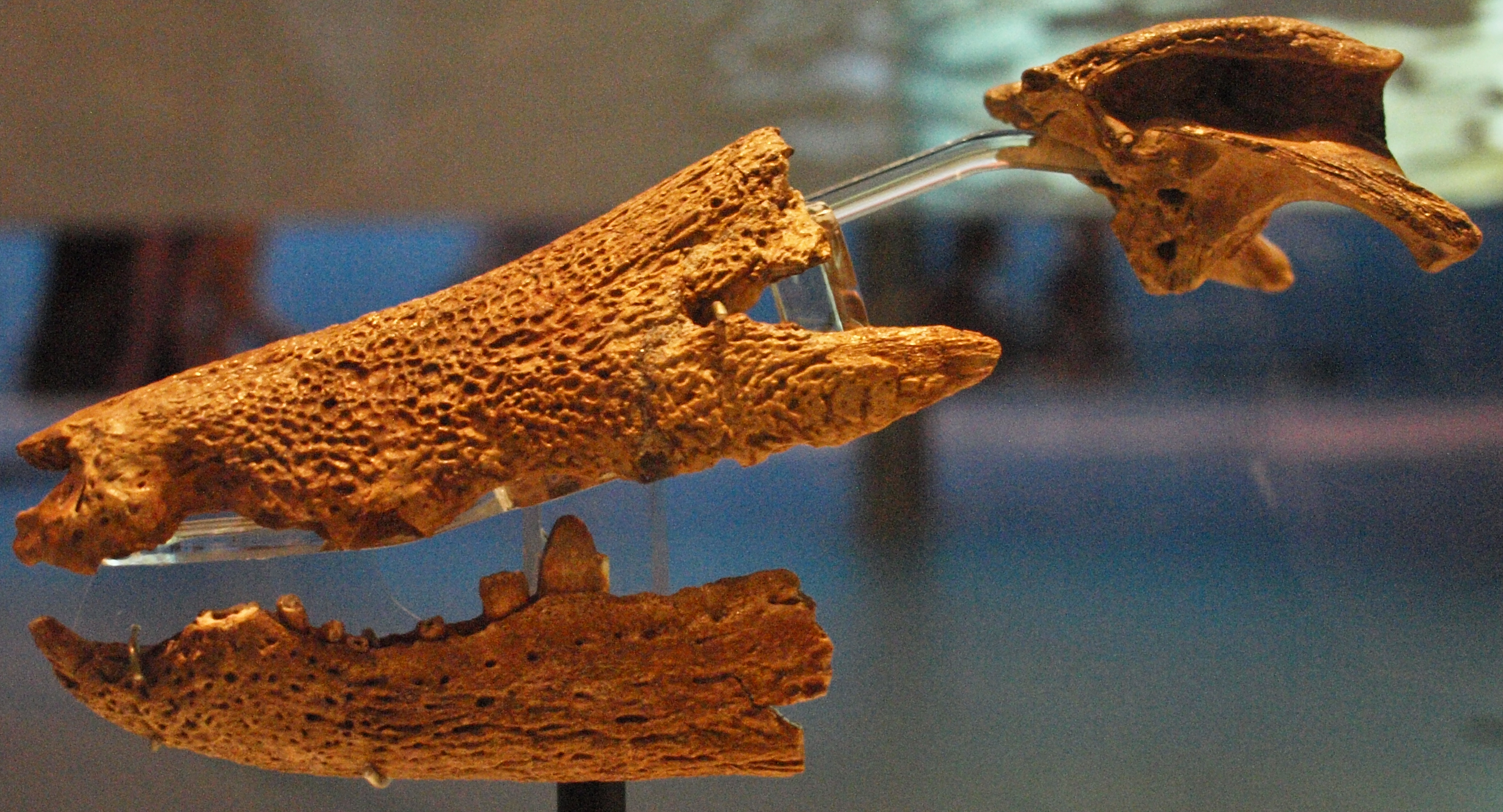
- Skull of the peirosaurid Hamadasuchus rebouli on display at the Royal Ontario Museum
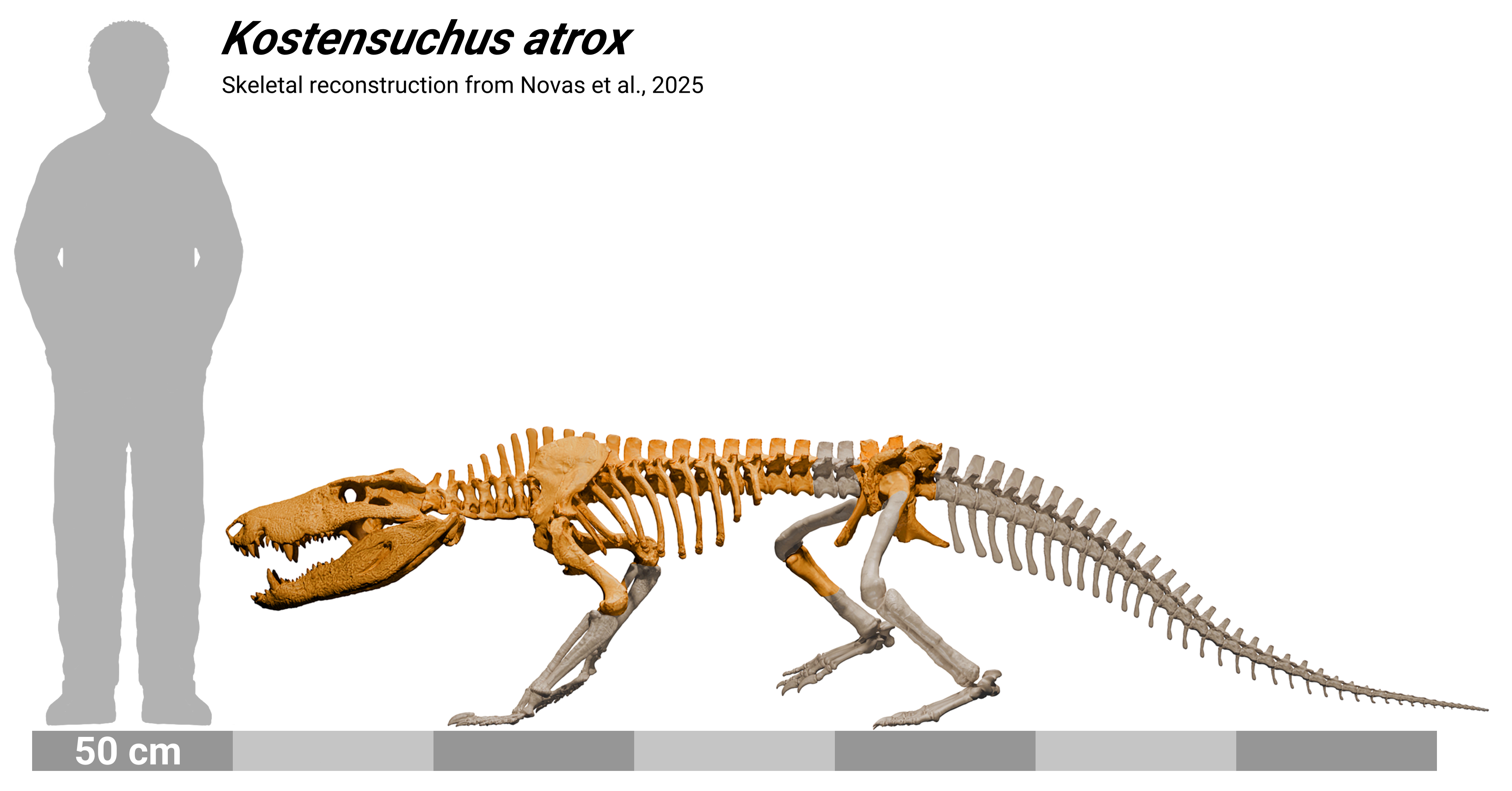
- Size comparison of Kostensuchus, the largest known peirosaurid

Scientific classification
- Kingdom: Animalia
- Phylum: Chordata
- Class: Reptilia
- Clade: Pseudosuchia
- Clade: Crocodylomorpha
- Clade: †Notosuchia
- Clade: †Peirosauria
- Family: †Peirosauridae; Gasparini, 1982

Genera
- †Antusuchus; †Miadanasuchus; †Kostensuchus; †Stolokrosuchus?; †Trematochampsa?; †Lomasuchinae; †Lomasuchus; †Peirosaurinae; †Antaeusuchus; †Barcinosuchus; †Barrosasuchus; †Bayomesasuchus; †Colhuehuapisuchus; †Gasparinisuchus; †Hamadasuchus; †Montealtosuchus; †Patagosuchus; †Peirosaurus; †Uberabasuchus

= Peirosauridae =

Peirosauridae Temporal range: Aptian–Maastrichtian

Extinct family of reptiles

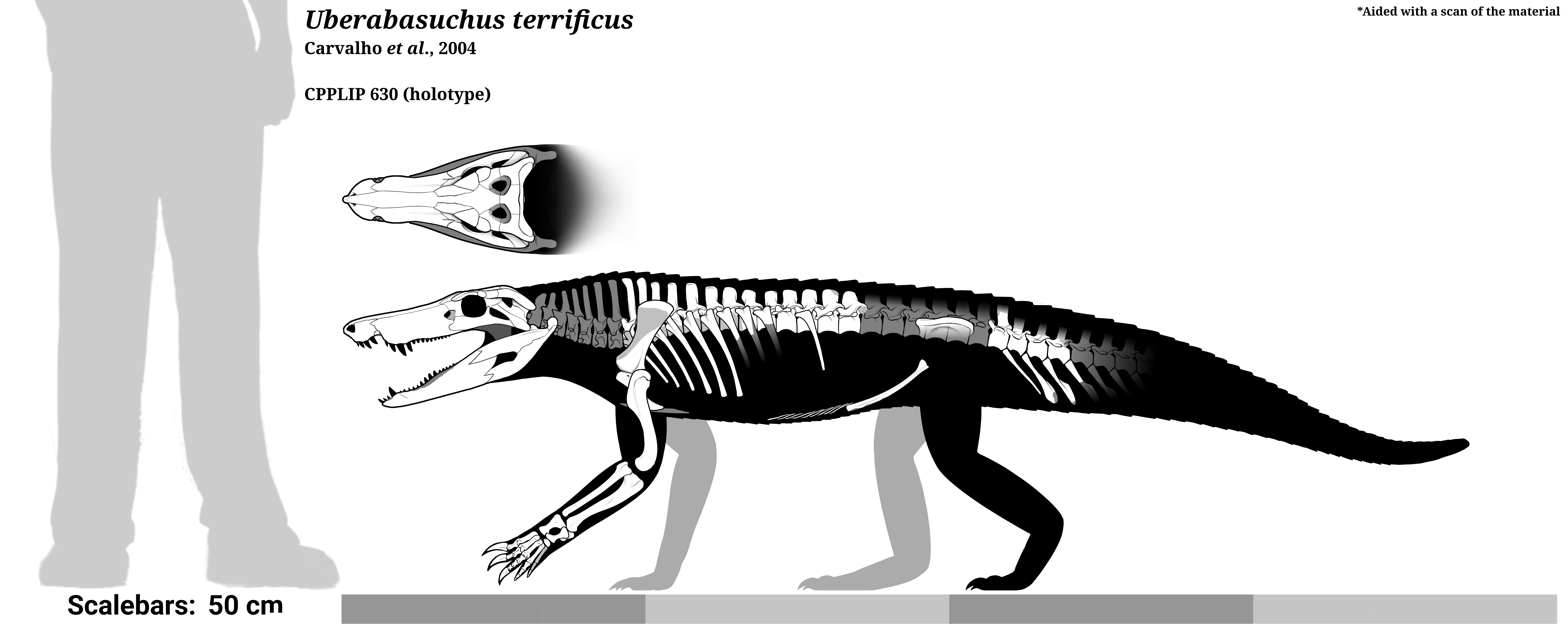
Skeletal reconstruction of Uberabasuchus

Peirosauridae is a Gondwanan family of mesoeucrocodylians that lived during the Cretaceous period. It was a clade of terrestrial crocodyliforms that evolved a rather dog-like skull, and were terrestrial carnivores. It was phylogenetically defined in 2004 as the most recent common ancestor of Peirosaurus and Lomasuchinae and all of its descendants. Lomasuchinae is a subfamily of peirosaurids that includes the genus Lomasuchus.

Lomasuchinae was defined in the same 2004 study as the most recent common ancestor of Lomasuchus and Mahajangasuchini and all of its descendants. Mahajangasuchini, also constructed in the study, was defined as the most recent common ancestor of Mahajangasuchus and Uberabasuchus and all of its descendants. However, all more recent phylogenetic analyses placed Mahajangasuchus within its own family, Mahajangasuchidae, along with the newly named Kaprosuchus.

== Palaeobiology ==
A clutch of eggs from the Adamantina Formation tentatively assigned as belonging to Peirosauridae suggests that their eggs may have been well adapted for highly moist and humid conditions.

== Genera ==
The following list of genera follows Martinelli et al., 2012 unless otherwise noted.

- Antaeusuchus from the Cenomanian of Morocco.
- Antusuchus from the Cenomanian of Argentina.
- Barcinosuchus from the Aptian - Albian of Argentina.
- Bayomesasuchus from the Turonian - Cenomanian of Argentina.
- Barrosasuchus from the Santonian of Argentina.
- Colhuehuapisuchus from the Campanian- early Maastrichtian of Argentina.
- Gasparinisuchus from the Santonian - early Campanian of Argentina.
- Hamadasuchus from the Albian - Cenomanian of Morocco.
- Kostensuchus from the Maastrichtian of Argentina.
- Lomasuchus from the Santonian of Argentina.
- Montealtosuchus from the Turonian - Santonian of Brazil.
- Patagosuchus from the Coniacian of Argentina.
- Peirosaurus from the late Maastrichtian of Brazil.
- Uberabasuchus from the late Maastrichtian of Brazil.
