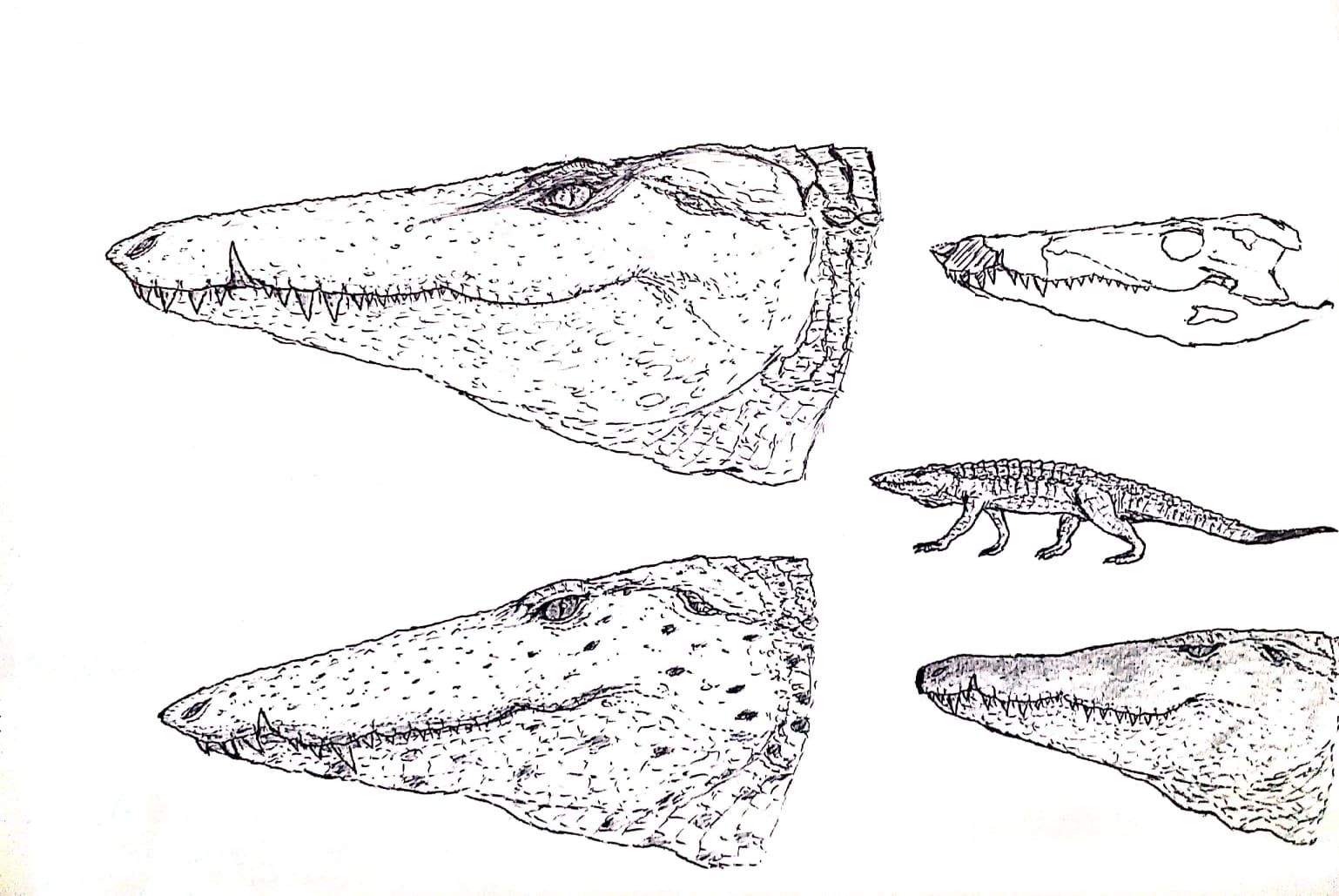
- Peirosaurus (top left)

Scientific classification
- Kingdom: Animalia
- Phylum: Chordata
- Class: Reptilia
- Clade: Pseudosuchia
- Clade: Crocodylomorpha
- Clade: †Notosuchia
- Family: †Peirosauridae
- Genus: †Peirosaurus; Price, 1955

Type species
- †Peirosaurus torminni Price, 1955

= Peirosaurus =

Peirosaurus Temporal range: Late Cretaceous, 68–66 Ma

Extinct genus of reptiles

Peirosaurus is an extinct genus of peirosaurid crocodylomorph known from the Late Cretaceous period (late Maastrichtian stage) of Minas Gerais, southern Brazil. It contains a single species, Peirosaurus torminni. It is the type genus of the family Peirosauridae.

== Discovery ==
Peirosaurus is known from the holotype DGM 433-R, fragmentary skull (left premaxilla bearing five teeth, isolated maxillary and dentary teeth and left palpebral bone) and partial postcranial skeleton including radius, ulna, left pubis and ischium, some presacral and a single caudal vertebrae, ribs, haemal arches and dermal plates. It was collected by Llewellyn Ivor Price in 1947-1949 at the Price Quarry 3, Peirópolis Site near Uberaba, in the Serra da Galga Formation (Bauru Group), dating to the late Maastrichtian stage of the Late Cretaceous, about 68-66 million years ago.

A partial skull and several postcranial elements such as vertebrae and dermal plates from the Bajo de la Carpa Formation in Argentina and another partial skull and several unprepared postcranial elements from the Anacleto Formation, Argentina, were assigned to Peirosaurus by Gasparini, Chiappe and Fernandez (1991) and Praderio, Martinelli and Candeiro (2008), respectively. However, more recently Agustín G. Martinelli, Joseph J.W. Sertich, Alberto C. Garrido and Ángel M. Praderio concluded that the traits which used to unite the holotype (from Brazil) and the referred material from Argentina are shared with other peirosaurids and some other mesoeucrocodylians. They reassigned the Argentinian specimens to a new genus, Gasparinisuchus, and although overlapping materials between the genera are limited to the premaxilla and the dentition, Gasparinisuchus can be differentiated from Peirosaurus on the basis of its broad, rounded rostrum, anteroposteriorly short premaxilla, reduced perinareal fossa, and short premaxillary interdental spaces. Hence, Peirosaurus is known only from its holotype.

== Description ==
Peirosaurus has a ziphodont dentition that is somewhat heterodont, with conical premaxillary teeth and serrated maxillary and posterior mandibular teeth. The rostrum is laterally compressed with a grove between the maxilla and premaxilla to accommodate for an enlarged mandibular tooth. A maxillary wedge-like anterior process is also present. The external nares face slightly forward and anteriorly protrude. The dorsal osteoderms are thin and sculptured with low longitudinal keels while the abdominal ones are smaller and lack keels.

Peirosaurus shares a number of features with the closely related genus Uberabasuchus, found from a nearby locality in Uberaba. These include a similar tooth size pattern and the large maxillary anterior process. These genera were differentiated from each other as the rostrum of Uberabasuchus is more compressed than that of Peirosaurus, which is relatively broad. However, the rostrum wasn't preserved in the holotype of Peirosaurus. The removal of MOZ 1750 PV (which preserved the rostrum) from the genus Peirosaurus suggests a possible synonymy between Peirosaurus and Uberabasuchus. In 2025 a detailed study found out that specimen CPPLIP 630, previously known as Uberabasuchus terrificus, be renamed as a reference specimen of Peirosaurus torminni.

Though many of the features of the premaxilla and dentition of Peirosaurus are widespread among peirosaurids and many mesoeucrocodylians, several are shared exclusively with Uberabasuchus. Among these features some are not observed in other peirosaurids. These include the relatively long anteroposterior facial length of the premaxilla, the elongate and strongly anteromedially directed dorsomedial process of the premaxilla, and the sharply defined and elevated margin of the perinarial fossa. There are differences between the two taxa such as differences in the relative thickness of dorsal osteoderms and the absence of a denticulate mesial carina on the first premaxillary tooth in Peirosaurus, but not in Uberabasuchus. However, these characters are considered to be minor and their taxonomic value may be individually variable. As postcranial materials of both Peirosaurus and Uberabasuchus are known but are not yet formally described, they are tentatively considered to be valid taxa.
