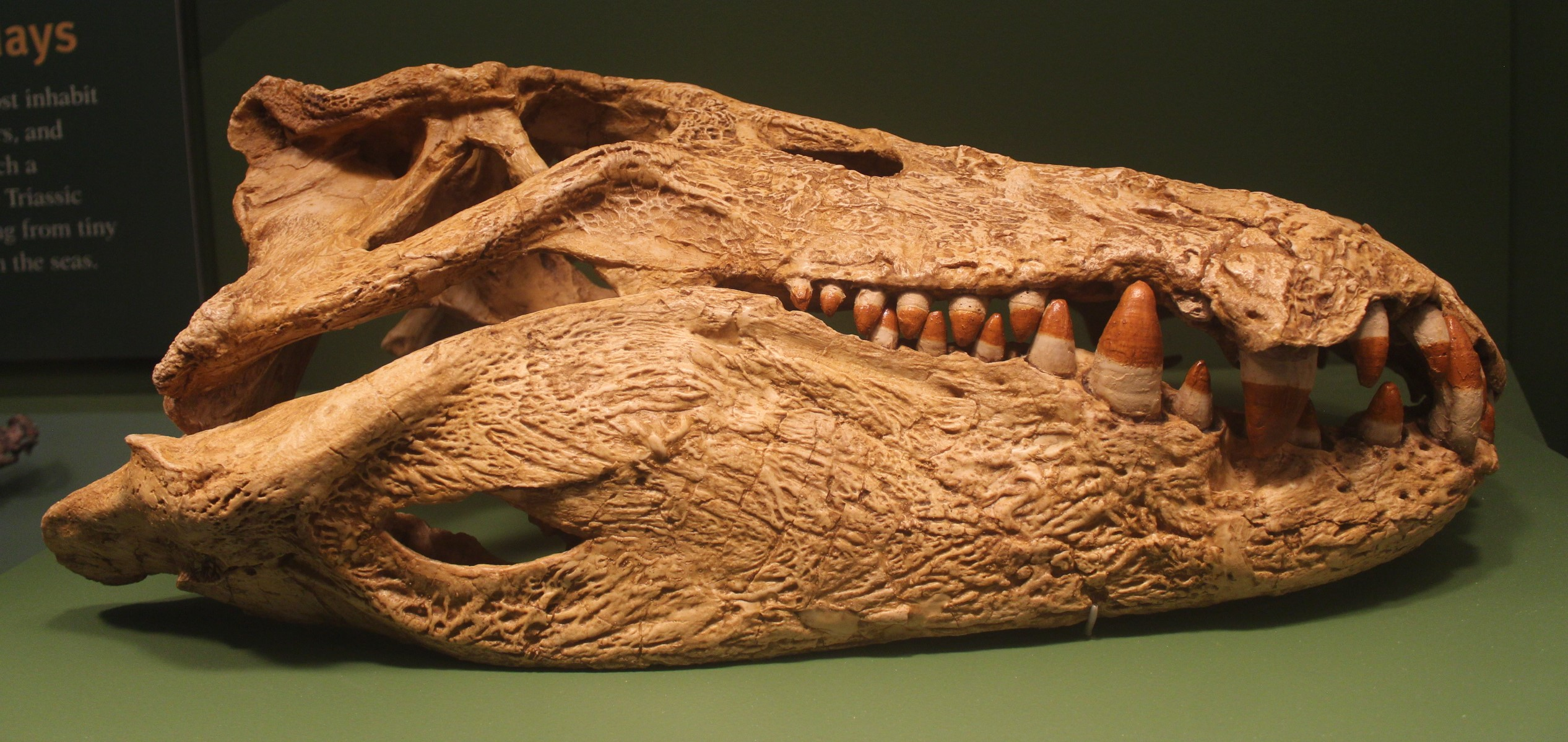
- Skull of Mahajangasuchus insignis in the Field Museum of Natural History.
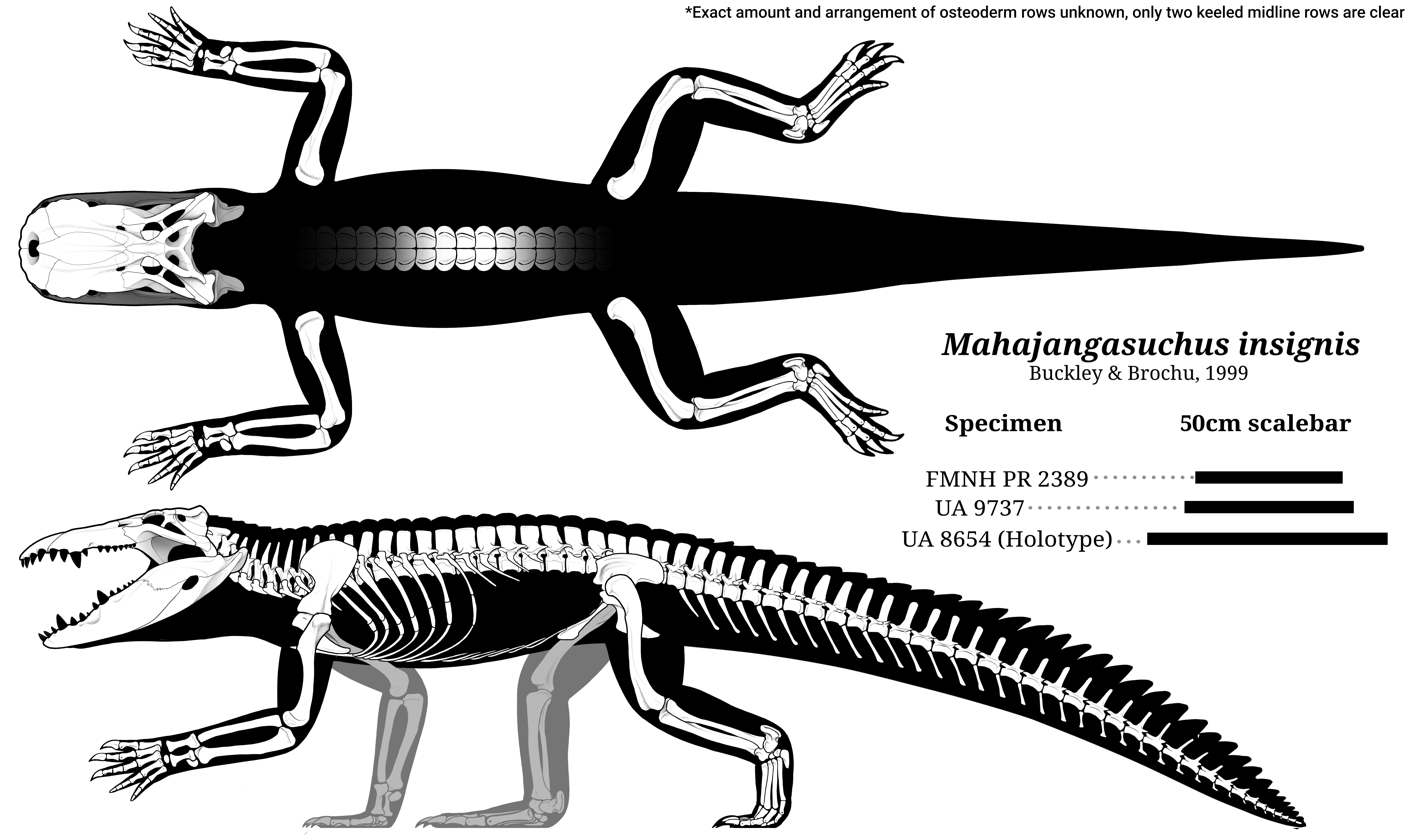
- Skeletal reconstruction

Scientific classification
- Kingdom: Animalia
- Phylum: Chordata
- Class: Reptilia
- Clade: Pseudosuchia
- Clade: Crocodylomorpha
- Clade: †Notosuchia
- Family: †Mahajangasuchidae
- Genus: †Mahajangasuchus; Buckley & Brochu, 1998

Type species
- †Mahajangasuchus insignis Buckley & Brochu, 1998

= Mahajangasuchus =

Mahajangasuchus Temporal range: Upper Cretaceous, 70–66 Ma

Extinct genus of reptiles

Mahajangasuchus is an extinct genus of crocodyliform which had blunt, laterally compressed and serrated teeth. The type species, M. insignis, lived during the Late Cretaceous; its fossils have been found in the Maevarano Formation in northern Madagascar. It was a fairly large predator, measuring up to 4 metres (13 ft) long.

== Discovery and naming ==
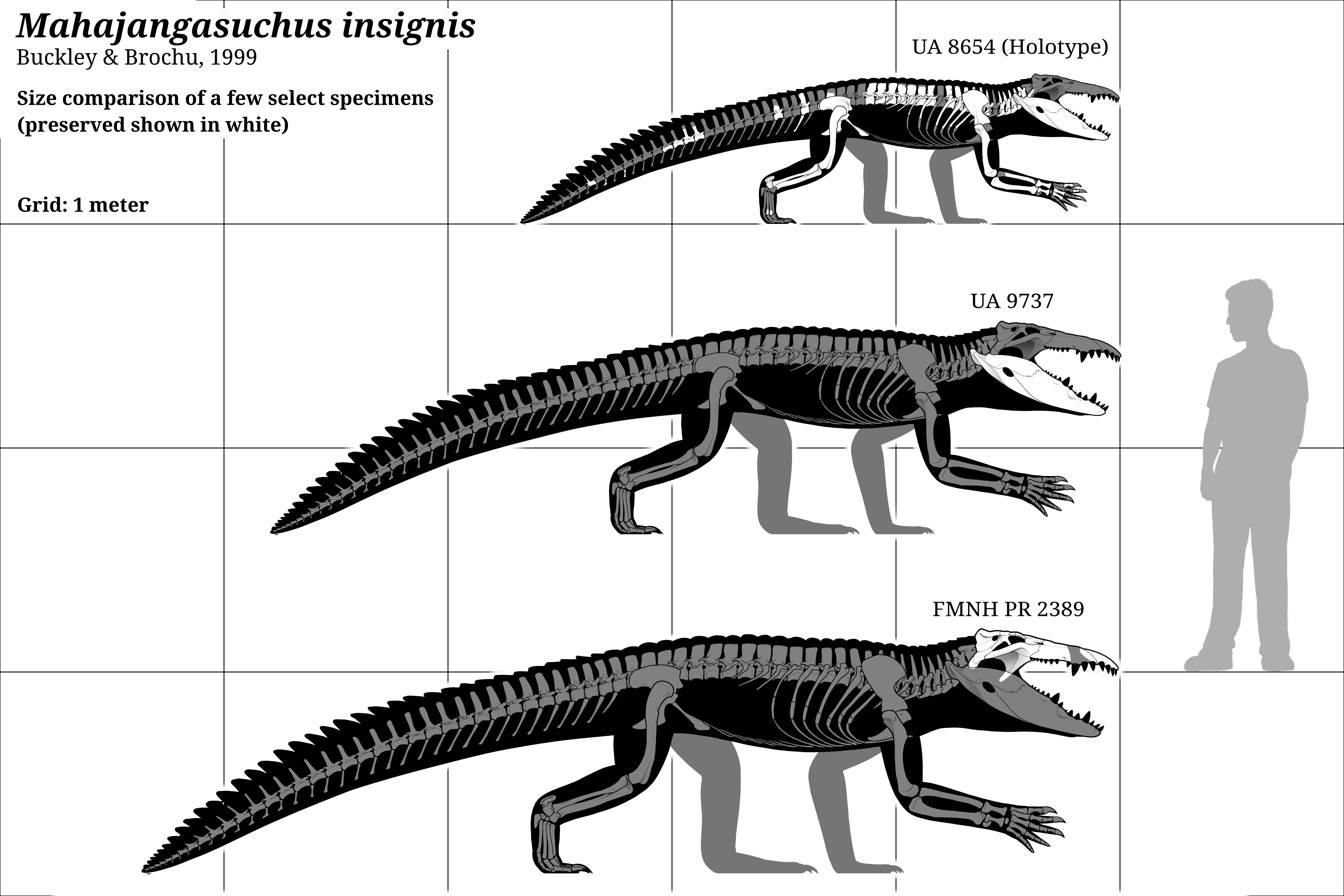
Diagram and size comparison of notable specimens of Mahajangasuchus

With the inception of the Mahajanga Basin Project (MBP) in 1993, led by Dr. David Krause, came a significant increase of discoveries and research into the fauna of the Maastrichtian Maevarano Formation in northern Madagascar. This included a variety of crocodylomorphs with the largest specimen being a well preserved disarticulated skeleton discovered in 1995 roughly 1 km south-east of the village of Berivotra. This skeleton, specimen UA 8654, consisted of a complete left and partial right mandible, vertebrae of the cervical, dorsal, saccral and caudal regions, several ribs as well as material of the pectoral, pelvic girdle and limb bones. Osteoderms and isolated teeth have also been found in association with the skeletal remains. Although this specimen was originally believed to represent Trematochampsa oblita (now Miadanasuchus oblita), further research concluded that this specimen instead represented a new genus of crocodylomorph, named Mahajangasuchus insignis by Buckley and Brochu in 1999. While the holotype specimen lacked cranial remains, further excavations did uncover skull material of the animal.

The generic name means "crocodile from Mahajanga Basin" in reference to the area the fossils had been found in. The species epithet insignis is Latin and means "remarkable" or "extraordinary", chosen to not only reflect the preservation of the holotype specimen but also due to the strange morphology of the mandible.

== Description ==
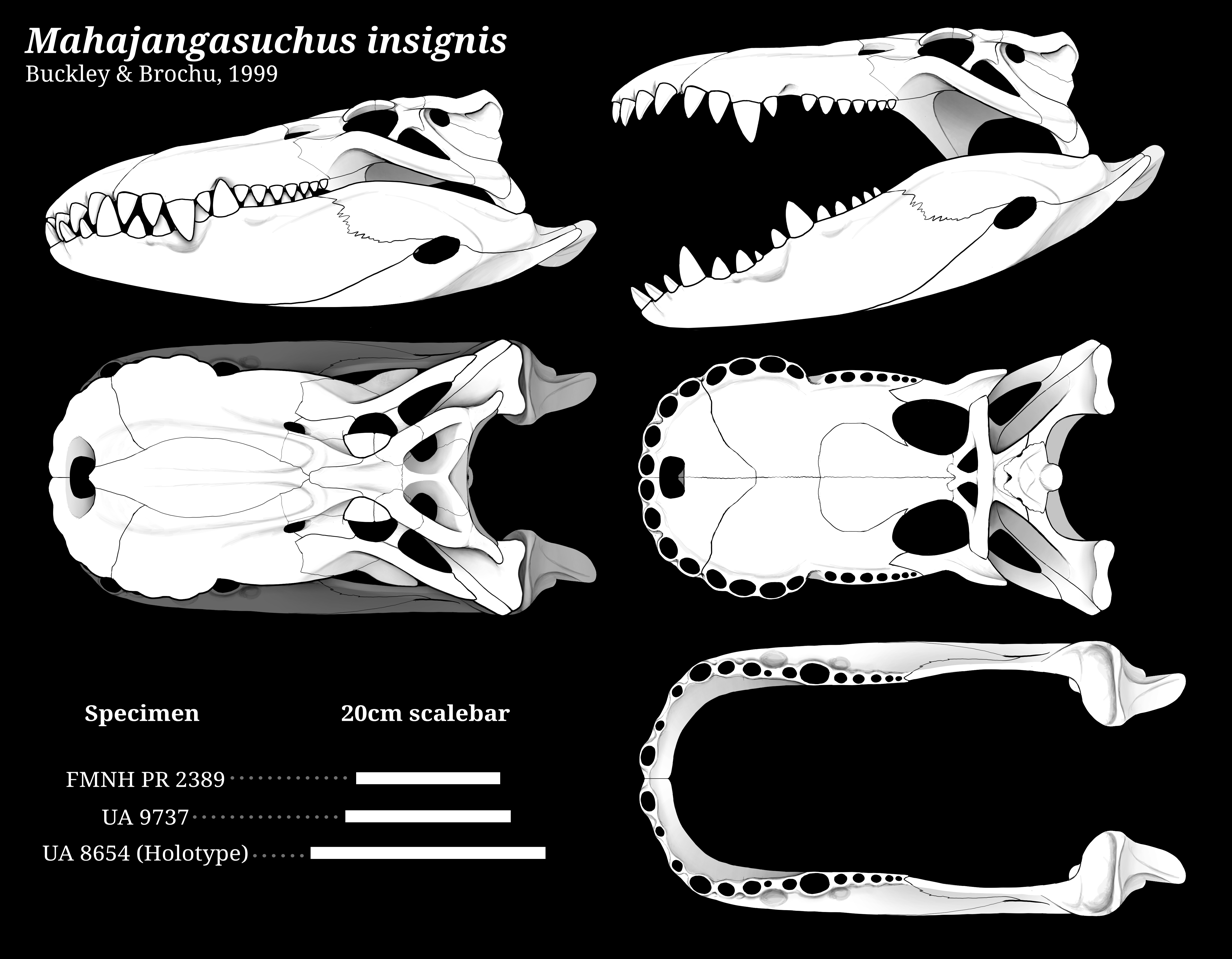
Skull diagram in different views

Mahajangasuchus was a medium to large sized crocodylomorph, characterized by a strongly arched jugal, depressions beneath the orbit, a broad platyrostral snout, a massive choanal septum, a broad and rounded anterior edge of the dentary, ziphodont teeth and short mandibular symphysis, reaching posteriorly only to the posterior margin of the 2nd alveolus, superficially resembling the Cenozoic caiman Mourasuchus.

=== Skull ===
In Mahajangasuchus the skull is noticeably platyrostral, being flat and wide. The premaxilla possesses 1 to 4, potentially 5, tooth positions on each side, with the 3rd premaxillary tooth being the largest. The maxilla of Mahajangasuchus are very low in lateral view, appearing almost flat, and are heavily sculpted. They are roughly as long as they are wide with 11 to 12 alveoli on each side. The first 4 maxillary teeth were closely spaced with the 3rd being the largest. The 5th to 9th were smaller than the previous 4, but roughly evenly sized amongst themselves before the 10th and 11th (and potentially 12th) would have marked a further decrease in size. There is a notable diastema located between the 4th and 5th maxillary alveoli, most likely to make space for a large dentary tooth. Medially to the antorbital fenestra the maxilla forms a prominent ridge that runs laterally to the maxillary nasal contact. The nasals are fused, however it is uncertain if they reached up to the external nares. The nasals did not contact the lacrimal, which is anteriorly bifurcated and forms most of the posterior edge of the antorbital fenestra, a condition also seen in Stolokrosuchus, in which the antorbital fenestra is almost entirely located within the lacrimal. Along the contact with the prefrontals the lacrimals swell to form the posterolateral portion of the prominent rostral ridge. The posteromedial portion is formed by the elongated prefrontals. The frontal is broad between the orbits and narrows significantly between the prefrontals before making contact with the nasals. It only extends slightly between the supratemporal fenestrae. The medial wall and floor of the supratemporal fenestrae is made up by the parietal. In specimen FMNH PR 2448 the lateral edges of the fenestrae are strongly everted, creating a narrow medial groove. This feature however seems to vary between specimen, as FMNH PR 2389 is flat in comparison. A thin lamina of the parietal overhangs the posterior and medial edge of the supratemporals. The dentary has 14 alveoli on each half, the biggest of which being the 4th and the 9th. The first dentary tooth is elevated above the others.

=== Postcranial skeleton ===
Of the postcranial skeletal several elements are known. The holotype preserves 5 cervical vertebrae, thought to be the 1st to 4th and 5th postaxial cervicals which are amphicoelous to slightly amphiplatyan in shape. The intercentrum is wider than long and the neural spine of the cervical grows progressively taller as they approach the dorsal vertebrae. The hypapophysis of the cervicals are knob-like. The first two dorsal vertebrae are similar in shape to the cervicals with strongly compressed neural spines. The neural spine of the 3rd dorsal is blade like with a knob on the dorsal tip and the hypapophysis is prominent with a stronger keel than the other vertebrae. The 4th dorsal vertebra is the last with a distinct hypapophysis and the first with the parapophysis is entirely located on the neural spine. The posterior dorsal vertebrae are marked by massive centra and short transverse processes. The neural spines of the posterior dorsal vertebrae progressively grow shorter and anteroposteriorly elongated. The single preserved saccral is stout. The first caudal vertebra lacks a neural spine while the anterior vertebra possesses a tall spines and short transverse processes. The other caudals are from more posterior regions of the tail and notably elongated with relatively high neural spines. 28 ribs from various areas of the skeleton are known. Of the pectoral girdle and forelimbs both scapula is known, the left is complete while of the right only the distal end has been found. Neither coracoid is known. The left humerus is known as well as the shaft of the right. The shaft of the humerus is almost straight and slender, but the curvature of the proximal head and distal condylar region give the bone an overall sigmoid shape. Further material includes a complete left ulna and the distal three fourths of the right ulna, elements of both radius, complete left radiale and ulnare as well as distal phallanges and metacarpals. From the pelvic girdle the complete right ilium has been preserved as well as both ischia, however both are damaged. The articular area for the pubis is well developed. The pubis had a tear-drop shaped articular surface for the pubis and a more blade-like distal end. The femora, tibiae and fibulae resemble those of modern crocodilians. The pes are known from the right calcaneum and 2 distal metatarsals.

The osteoderms of Mahajangasuchus had deep irregular pits over their surface except for the anterior margin, where they are overlapped by the prior osteoderm. They have strong keels and are subquadrangular to ovate in shape, suggesting that the dorsal armor did not consist of more than two rows of osteoderms.

== Phylogeny ==
Historically Mahajangasuchus has oftentimes been grouped closest to peirosaurids, such as in both Buckley and Brochu (1999) and Turner et al. (2008) (under the inclusion of Trematochampsa taqueti). Sereno et al.. (2001) placed the genus within the family Trematochampsidae, while a later study by Turner and Calvo (2005) placed it within Peirosauridae. It was placed in the newly constructed family Mahajangasuchidae along with the genus Kaprosuchus by Sereno and Larrson (2009), who considered the family to be basal neosuchians not closely allied with peirosaurids. However, later analysis returned Mahajangasuchus, alongside Kaprosuchus, to its sister position to peirosaurids and furthermore recovered this clade to be a branch of early diverging notosuchians. The phylogeny below is a simplified cladogram based on the results of Nicholl et al. (2021) which recovered mahajangasuchids as a sister clade to peirosaurids, the resulting grouping in turn taking a sister position to uruguaysuchids.

- - Uruguaysuchidae
  - - Peirosauridae
    - - Mahajangasuchidae
        - Kaprosuchus
        - Mahajangasuchus

== Paleobiology ==
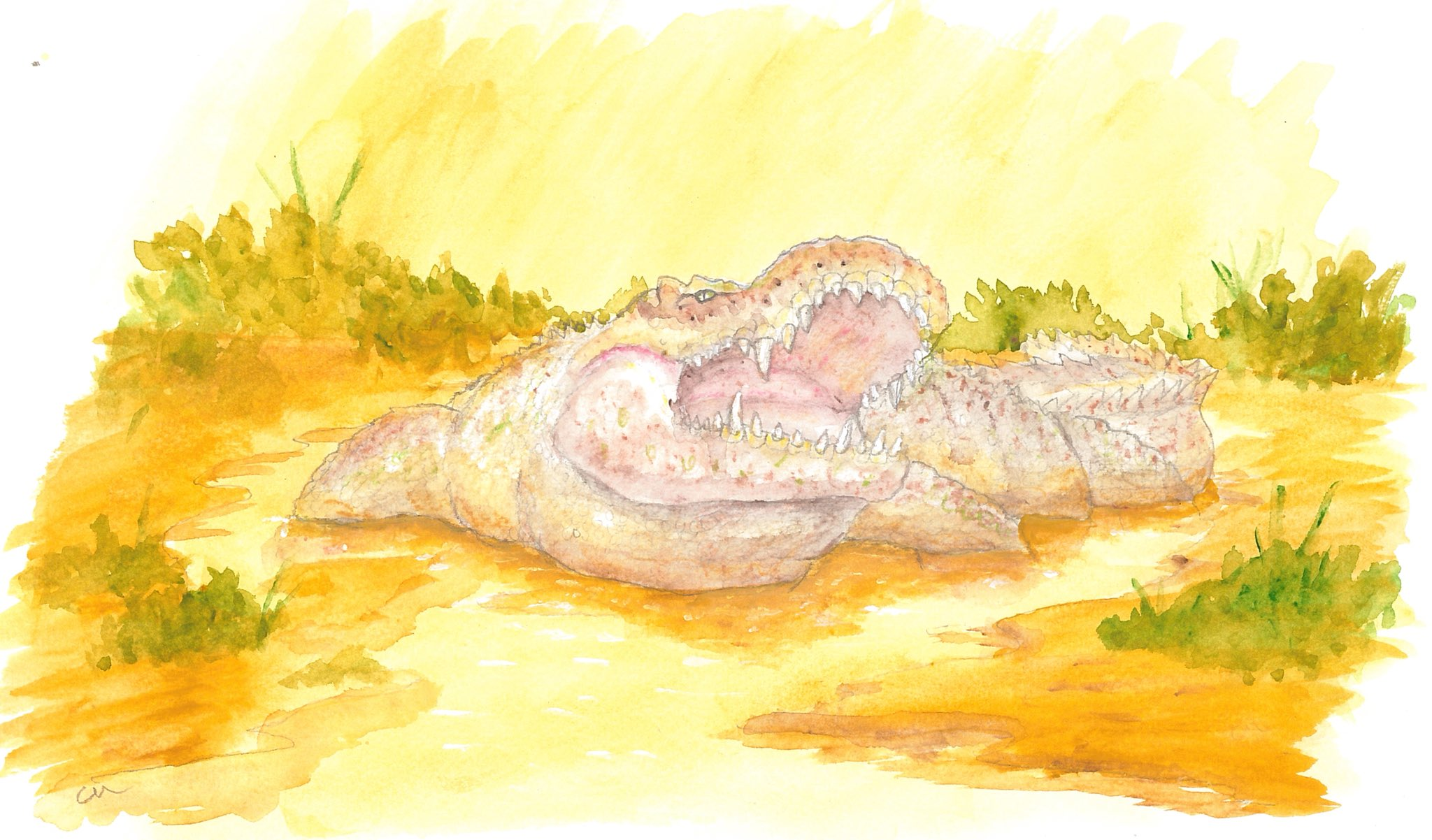
Restoration of Mahajangasuchus sunning itself

Although Notosuchians are known for their terrestrial lifestyle, mahajangasuchids present a deviation from this ecology by having evolved multiple traits indicative of a more semi-aquatic lifestyle. The high-sided skull table with ventrally positioned jaw articulation differs from the dorsoventrally compressed crania with posteriorly located jaw articulation of modern Eusuchians, while the broad and shallow rostrum appears to have been obtained convergently to similar morphology seen in the Neosuchians. The palate of Mahajangasuchus is similar to that of modern Eusuchians, which Turner et al. determine supports the idea that this morphology evolved to resist torsional forces during feeding. A semi-aquatic lifestyle was also recovered by Wilberg et al. (2019), proposing that mahajangasuchids (in their phylogeny clading together with Stolokrosuchus) represent a lineage of Notosuchian that independently adapted from a terrestrial to a semi-aquatic lifestyle, citing features such as the dorsally located nares and orbits as well as the platyrostrine skull shape.

Subadults of Mahajangasuchus insignis were probably prey for adults of the snake Madtsoia madagascariensis, though such large prey would have been injurious for the snake.

== Bibliography ==
- Buckley, G.A. (2001). "A skull of Mahajangasuchus insignis (Crocodyliformes) from the Upper Cretaceous of Madagascar". Journal of Vertebrate Paleontology 21 (3), supplement: A36
