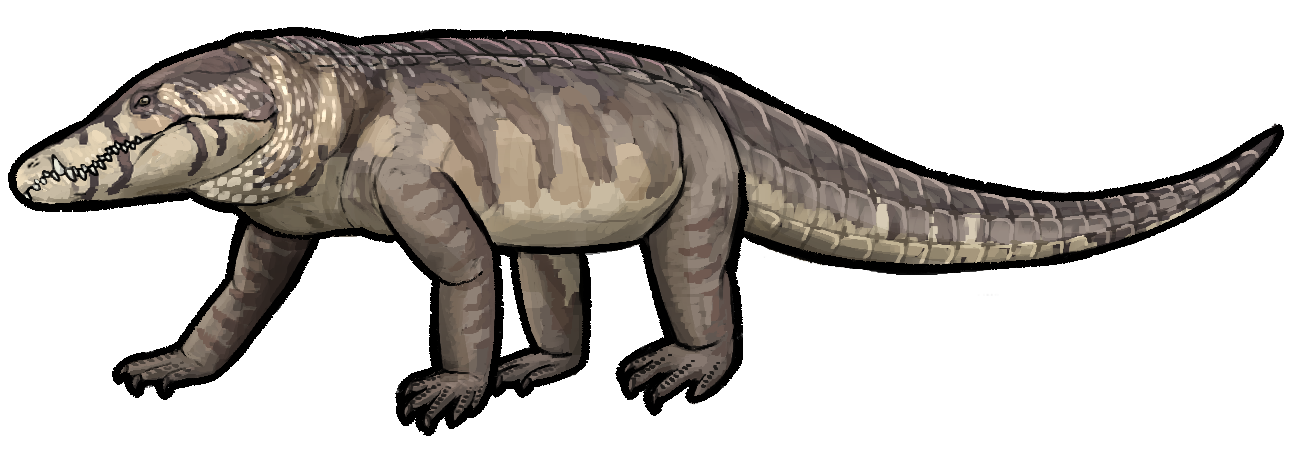

Scientific classification
- Domain: Eukaryota
- Kingdom: Animalia
- Phylum: Chordata
- Class: Reptilia
- Clade: Archosauria
- Clade: Pseudosuchia
- Clade: Crocodylomorpha
- Clade: †Notosuchia
- Clade: †Sebecosuchia
- Clade: †Sebecia
- Family: †Peirosauridae
- Genus: †Lomasuchus; Gasparini et al., 1991

Type species
- †Lomasuchus palpebrosus Gasparini et al., 1991

= Lomasuchus =

Lomasuchus Temporal range: Late Cretaceous, Santonian

Extinct genus of reptiles

Lomasuchus is an extinct genus of peirosaurid notosuchian known from the Late Cretaceous (Santonian stage) of Neuquén Province, western central Argentina. It contains a single species, Lomasuchus palpebrosus.

It is known only from the holotype MOZ 4084 PV which was found in the Loma de la Lata locality of the Neuquén Province, Patagonia. It was originally reported as collected from sediments of the Rio Colorado Subgroup, Neuquén Group. Later, Hugo and Leanza (2001) noted that this specimen was actually collected from the underlying Portezuelo Formation of the Rio Neuquén Subgroup, Neuquén Group. More recent stratigraphic work on this area identified that horizon as belonging to the younger, Coniacian-age, Plottier Formation of the Rio Neuquén Subgroup. This horizon is currently considered to pertain to the Santonian-age Bajo de la Carpa Formation of the Rio Colorado Subgroup.

Lomasuchus had a deep, narrow snout characteristic of peirosaurids. The serrated teeth were compressed, although not to the extent seen in other related genera such as Peirosaurus. Many similarities can be seen between its morphology and that of the related Uberabasuchus, such as the narrow snout and a groove at the maxilla-premaxilla contact that accommodated for an enlarged fourth mandibular tooth. The two genera are distinguished from one another on the basis of several features, including the shape of the orbits.

Lomasuchus lends its name to a subfamily of peirosaurids called the Lomasuchinae. Lomasuchinae was constructed in 2004 and included Lomasuchus (the type genus), and a tribe called Mahajangasuchini, which included Mahajangasuchus and Uberabasuchus. Mahajangasuchus is now placed outside Peirosauridae in a different family, Mahajangasuchidae.
