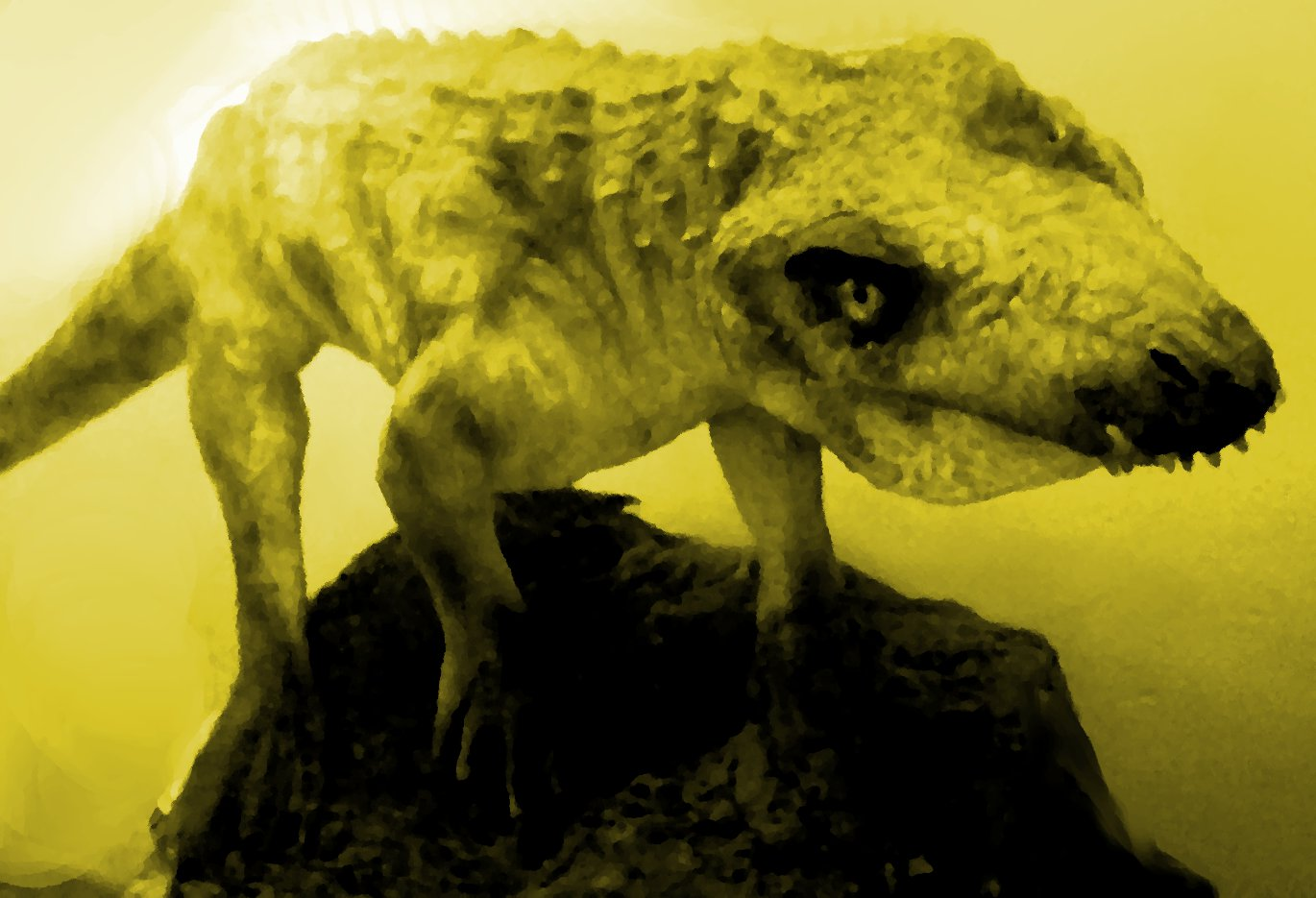
- Life restoration of M. arrudacamposi

Scientific classification
- Kingdom: Animalia
- Phylum: Chordata
- Class: Reptilia
- Clade: Pseudosuchia
- Clade: Crocodylomorpha
- Clade: †Notosuchia
- Family: †Peirosauridae
- Genus: †Montealtosuchus; Carvalho et al., 2007

Species
- †M. arrudacamposi Carvalho et al., 2007 (type)

= Montealtosuchus =

Montealtosuchus Temporal range: 72.1–68 Ma Campanian - Maastrichtian

Extinct genus of reptiles

Montealtosuchus is an extinct genus of terrestrial crocodyliform. It was discovered in 2004 in the Bauru Basin of Brazil, from Campanian-Maastrichtian deposits of the Adamantina Formation. The species was described in 2007, and assigned to the family Peirosauridae. The type species is M. arrudacamposi. The genus takes its name from the type locality in Monte Alto municipality.

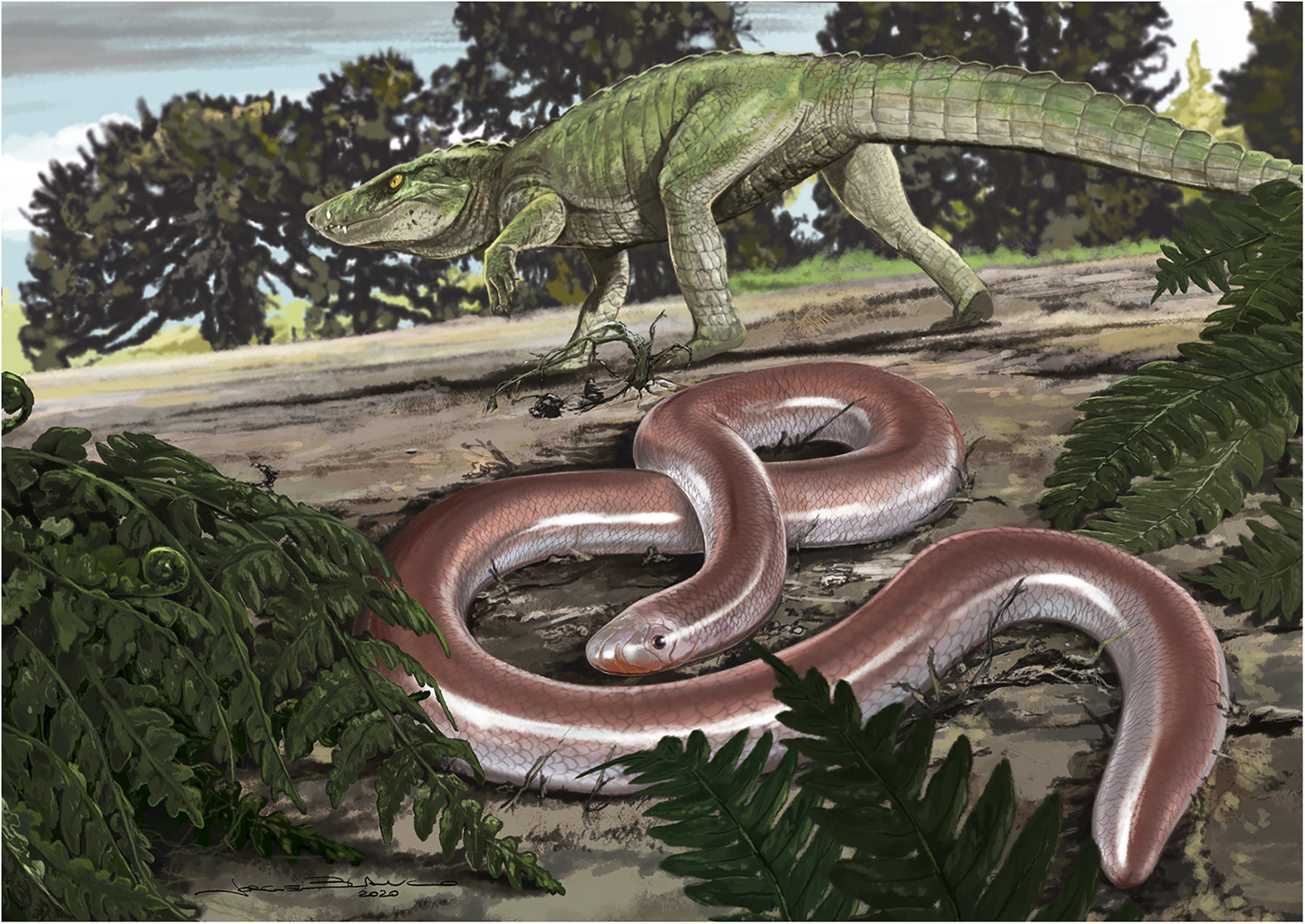
Life restoration of Montealtosuchus and Boipeba tayasuensis

This fossil, which was found in 2004, near the town of Monte Alto, in São Paulo state is very well preserved and quite complete. Most importantly, skull material has been found and this can help to link this fossil specimen with today's modern crocodiles. It would have grown to about 2 metres in length and would have been an active predator of smaller animals including dinosaurs. Biomechanical analyses indicate its oreinirostral (dome-shaped) skull was quite efficient, producing relatively high bite forces (between 828–1013 Newtons), with a strong, controlled bite for its body size. Perhaps it was more terrestrial than its modern relatives, using its semi-upright gait to pursue prey.

== External links and references ==
- Zootaxa
- English - Fossil of new crocodile species found in Brazil
