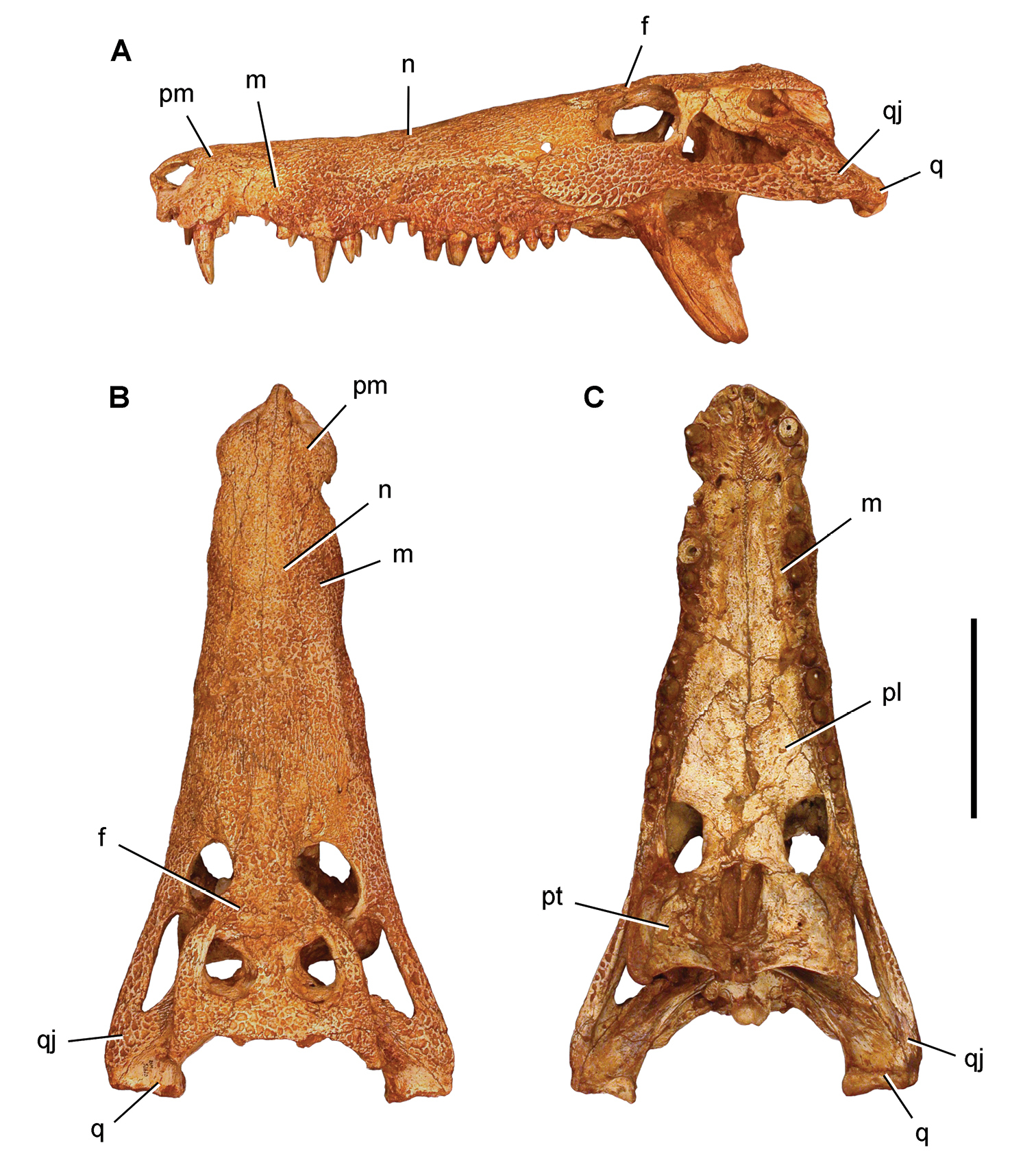
- Assigned H. rebouli skull

Scientific classification
- Kingdom: Animalia
- Phylum: Chordata
- Class: Reptilia
- Clade: Archosauria
- Clade: Pseudosuchia
- Clade: Crocodylomorpha
- Clade: †Notosuchia
- Family: †Peirosauridae
- Genus: †Hamadasuchus; Buffetaut, 1994

Species
- †H. rebouli Buffetaut, 1994 (type); †H. taouzensis? Nicholl et al., 2021

Synonyms
- Antaeusuchus? Nicholl et al., 2021

= Hamadasuchus =

Hamadasuchus Temporal range: Late Cretaceous

Extinct genus of reptiles

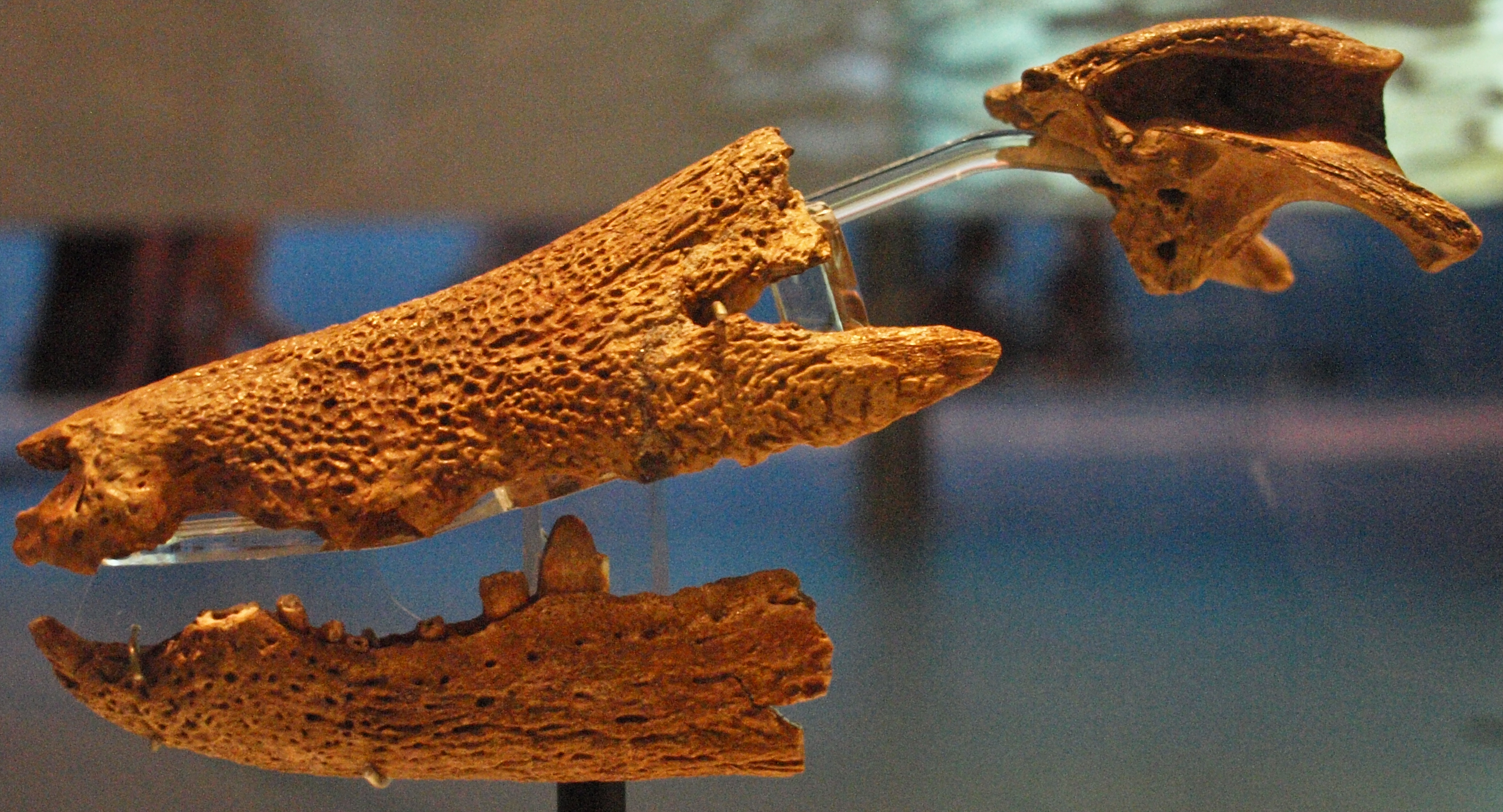
ROM 52620

Hamadasuchus is an extinct genus of sebecian crocodylomorph. Fossils have been found from the Kem Kem Formation outcropping in southeastern Morocco. These beds date back to the Albian and Cenomanian stages of the Late Cretaceous. It was first assigned to the family Trematochampsidae. Diagnostic features of the genus include its lateromedially compressed and serrated teeth. It was deep-snouted and had a slightly heterodont dentition with three distinct tooth morphologies present from sections of the lower jaw.
