= Miadanasuchus =

Miadanasuchus Temporal range: Late Cretaceous, Maastrichtian

Scientific classification
- Kingdom: Animalia
- Phylum: Chordata
- Class: Reptilia
- Clade: Pseudosuchia
- Clade: Crocodylomorpha
- Clade: †Notosuchia
- Family: †Peirosauridae
- Genus: †Miadanasuchus; Simons & Buckley, 2009
- Species: †M. oblita

Binomial name
- †Miadanasuchus oblita (Buffetaut & Taquet, 1979)

Synonyms
- Trematochampsa oblita Buffetaut & Taquet, 1979

Extinct genus of reptiles

Miadanasuchus is an extinct genus of peirosaurid notosuchian which lived in Madagascar during the late Cretaceous period.

The species was first described as Trematochampsa oblita by Éric Buffetaut and Philippe Taquet in 1979, based on fossils found in an unknown member of the Maastrichtian aged Maevarano Formation. Since 1993, subsequent discoveries in the Miadana Hills, near the village of Berivotra, brought more material of the species to scientific attention. In 2009, Erin L. Rasmusson Simons and Gregory A. Buckley determined that since there was "an absence of synapomorphies between Trematochampsa taqueti and Miadanasuchus oblita to the exception of all other trematochampsids", it warranted the erection of a new genus.

Apart from the material known from the Maevarano, additional material referred to Miadanasuchus (teeth, vertebrae, and a single osteoderm) has also been found in the Ankazomihaboka Formation, potentially extending the species' temporal range as far back as the Coniacian.

Its teeth were irregularly spaced and variable in height. Miadanasuchus is estimated to have been 3 metres (9.8 ft) in length.
