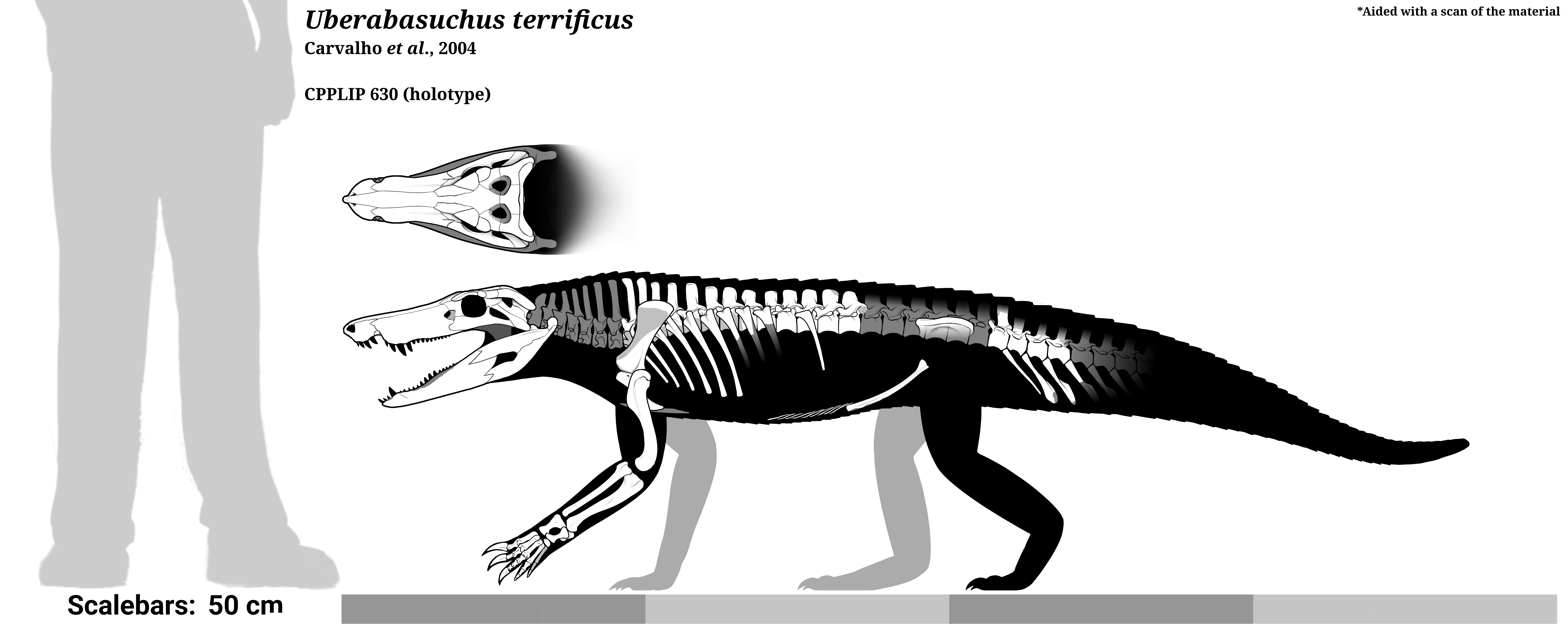
- Skeletal reconstruction, osteoderms omitted

Scientific classification
- Kingdom: Animalia
- Phylum: Chordata
- Class: Reptilia
- Clade: Pseudosuchia
- Clade: Crocodylomorpha
- Clade: †Notosuchia
- Family: †Peirosauridae
- Genus: †Uberabasuchus; Carvalho et al. 2004

Species
- †U. terrificus Carvalho et al. 2004 (type)

= Uberabasuchus =

Uberabasuchus Temporal range: Maastrichtian ~68–66 Ma

Extinct genus of reptiles

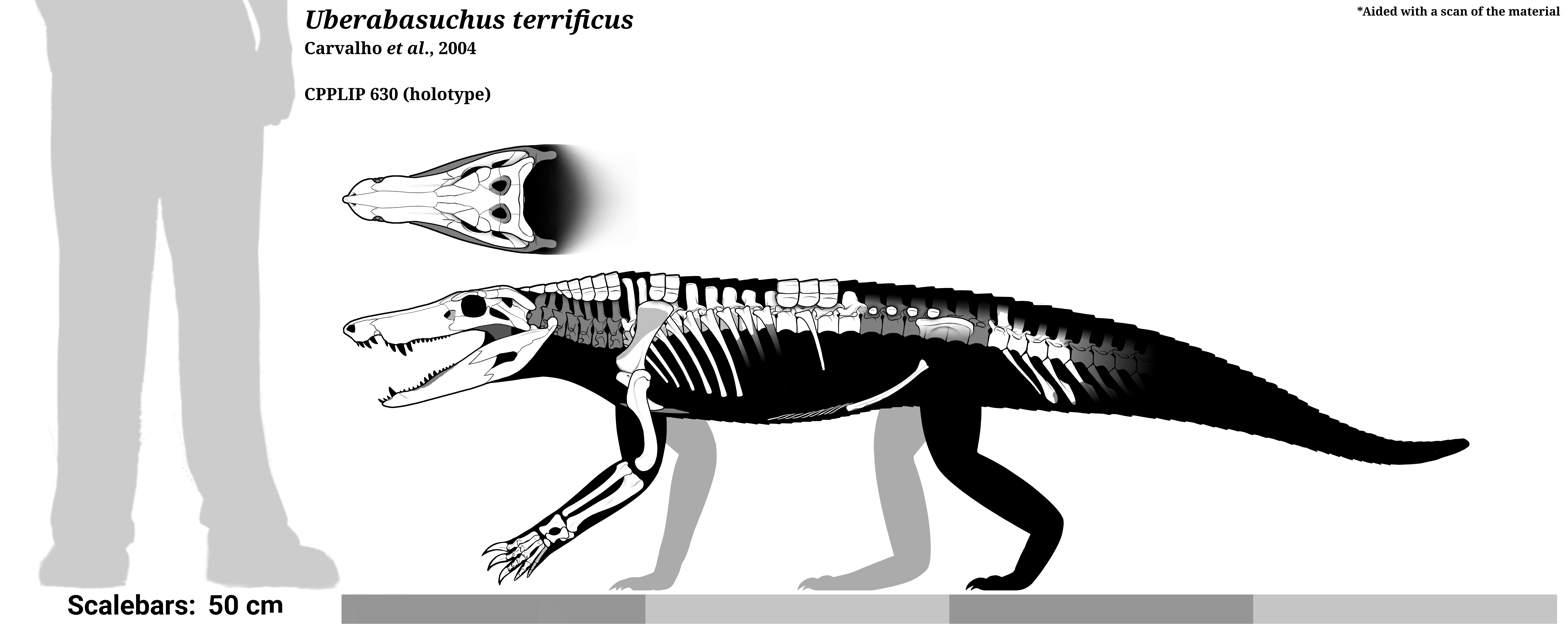

Uberabasuchus ("Uberaba crocodile") is an extinct genus of crocodylomorph from the Late Cretaceous Serra da Galga Formation of Brazil. It appears to have a high skull like that of the sebecosuchians, but differs from them in having teeth with circular cross-section. Thus, rather than slicing flesh and blood vessels, it is likely to have inflicted powerful crushing bites . The post-crania and the geology suggesting an arid climate indicate that Uberabasuchus was likely a terrestrial predator.
