= Farlanders =

Farlanders may refer to

- The Farlanders, a working title of the 2009 film, Away We Go
- The Farlanders, a musical act.
- Farlanders (video game), a 2023 video game.

It may also refer to:

- Farlander, a book written by Col Buchanan.
