= Colin Buchanan =

Colin Buchanan is the name of:

- Colin Buchanan (musician) (born 1964), Australian entertainer
- Colin Buchanan (actor) (born 1966), Scottish actor
- Colin Buchanan (town planner) (1907–2001), British town planner
- Colin Buchanan (bishop) (1934–2023), Church of England bishop
- Col Buchanan (born 1973), Northern Irish fantasy writer
