= Stands a Shadow =

2011 novel by Col Buchanan

- First edition
- Author: Col Buchanan
- Language: English
- Series: Heat of the World
- Genre: Fantasy
- Published: July 2011 Tor Books
- Media type: Print
- Pages: 384
- ISBN: 0-7653-3106-3
- Preceded by: Farlander

Stands a Shadow is the second book in the Heart of the World Series written by Col Buchanan.

== Plot ==
The story picks up where the first book ended. Ash is in Q’os the capital of Lanstrada, the Mannian heartland staking out the Temple of Whispers pursuing his personal vendetta to kill the Matriarch - Sasheen.

The "Diplomat" Ché is also in Q'os. After the successful attack on the Rōshun he is beginning to question his own beliefs. Sasheen has made him her personal diplomat and showing him the Head of Lucian which is kept alive by being immersed in a jar of Royal Milk also gave him his first taste of the Royal Milk which is a powerful narcotic.

Ash attempts to assassinate Sasheen during a procession with a crossbow but doesn't go through with it as she is surrounded with glass, which Ash suspects is strong enough that only explosives can break it. He follows her till she boards a ship and after much thought he follows her by diving into the water.

Ché meets Guan, the priest on the flagship of the fleet heading towards Khos. Guan and his sister, Swan are part of Sasheen’s travelling entourage. Ash is hiding in the bilge of one of the ships staying alive by stealing food and water in the night not knowing where he's heading. Sasheen assigns Ché a diplomatic task, to make an example of the lover of General Romano in retaliation to him slandering her son while intoxicated. The party reaches the island of Lagos, whose entire population was put to death on the orders of the Matriarch. While the General taking care of formalities as they near the harbor (Chir) Ché goes to his room and strangles his lover (Topo) and deposits his body in the water heater not knowing he is still alive once he realizes topo is still alive & and is being boiled alive he leaves him there. An enraged General Romano insults Sasheen's dead son to her face. Her advisers convince her not to punish him (kill him).

The ship Ash is on sinks in a storm and he washes up on a beach. He drags himself to a fire he sees and manages to scare off a few sailors about to assault a group of women before he passes out.

Curl, a survivor from the island of Lagos, who works as a prostitute in Bar-Khos enlists herself in the army as a medic.

On the orders of general Creed of Khos all convicted prisoners and those deemed too unfit for duty are enlisted into the Army. One of them is Bull who was previously discharged from the army for assaulting his senior officer. He later became a pit-fighter. He was found drenched in the blood of Adrianos, a commander who led the last successful offensive against the Imperial Fourth Army.

Ash agrees to become the bodyguard of Mistress Cheer and her group of women who are prostitutes following the army. Ash sneaks away in the night and makes his way to the Matriarch's tent which is heavily guarded. He makes his way to her tent by killing a sentry and stealing his clothes and almost reaches the enclosure. Inside Sasheen and her inner circle are having an orgy with narcotics and slaves in celebration of having landed with the army, Ché is also present although he's not participating. The next morning soldiers looking for the person who killed the guard question Ash but Mistress Cheer covers for him. He parts ways with her after refusing to answer her questions.

Sasheen sends Alarum as her ambassador to General Creed. He lays out the terms of surrender to creed with the threat that if he refuses every person of Khos will be killed and also offers him an ornate ceremonial dagger of Mann whose purpose is to take once own life.

Creed attacks the Mann army in the night at first they make good progress but are later halted taking heavy losses. In the confusion Ash tries to reach Sasheen, Ché shoots Sasheen in the confusion and Ash collapses after he almost reaches her. Ché grabs Ash and they escape.

Sasheen is still alive but barely. The Khos army reaches the city of Tume, they plan for a retreat by destroying the bridge. Ash, Ché and Curl are also in the city. While Ash is recovering Ché meets Curl and they escape from the twins Guan and Swan who were sent to kill Ché as he's been labeled a traitor.

Once it became clear that the Tume cannot be held, Creed and the soldiers abandon Tume, However, there are still several people in the city itself including Ash, Ché and Curl.

Sasheen has been poisoned by Ché's bullet. Only the Royal Milk is helping her survive. General Romano who became aware of this is plotting his coup.

Ash sees the banner of Sasheen and sets out to kill her. Ché and Curl escape the city by swimming through the lake. Ché gives Curl his waterlogged gun and turns back to hunt the twins who are hunting him and kills both. Curl who is waiting near the pickup point sees and picks up Ché who is injured. They both get on the airship but Ash, who changes his mind about killing Sasheen, returns but misses getting on the airship and is stranded in Tume, surrounded by the Mann army. He escapes by diving into the lake, but the Mann soldiers are on the banks and looking for any who try to escape that way.

Sasheen, who is dying from the poison, gives her final order to Archgeneral Sparus that Romano must not be allowed to be her successor and if necessary to kill him. She soon succumbs to the poison. Sparus and Romano meet after her death and Sparus informs Romano of Sasheen's last orders and that he intends to follow them. Romano tries to kill him with poison but fails and flees.

Ash survives his escape attempt and reaches safety in the woods. Ché lets slip to Curl that he's Mannian and Curl turns him over to the Khos Specials.

Bhan and Bull who were captured in the first battle and were tortured for information manage to escape with some other prisoners.

Ash finds Reese and tells her of her son Nico's death. She assaults him in her grief and tells him to leave. Ash eventually makes his way to Bar-Khos and meeting with as old contact learns of the destruction of Sato. Ash wanders around till he reaches Bilge Town, he finds a bar and decides to drink himself out of his misery. He gets drunk and falls asleep outside while its raining from where a man named Meer picks him up and takes him to his home. Meer talks of the teaching of the great fool and tells Ash he will talk about the Isles of Sky if Ash tells him about the land of Honshu. Later Meer tells Ash that he wishes to accompany Ash to Seto to make an offer to the remaining Rōshun and in return he will help Ash with his loss.

In the Temple of Whispers, Kira Sasheen's mother speaks before the other lords and ladies to decide who Sasheen's successor will be and she reveals her plans to concur the land of Zanzahar within a year of the fall of the free ports.

=== Epilogue ===
Meer takes Ash to Sato and the remains of the Monastery via an airship. He finds several survivors of the Rōshun order. Coya makes the remaining Rōshun his offer to choose a side and if in doing so they are no longer Rōshun, he reminds them that all things change. Ash later confides with Kosh that Meer has offered him a way of bringing back Nico, a way found in the Isles of Sky.
