= List of dragons in games =

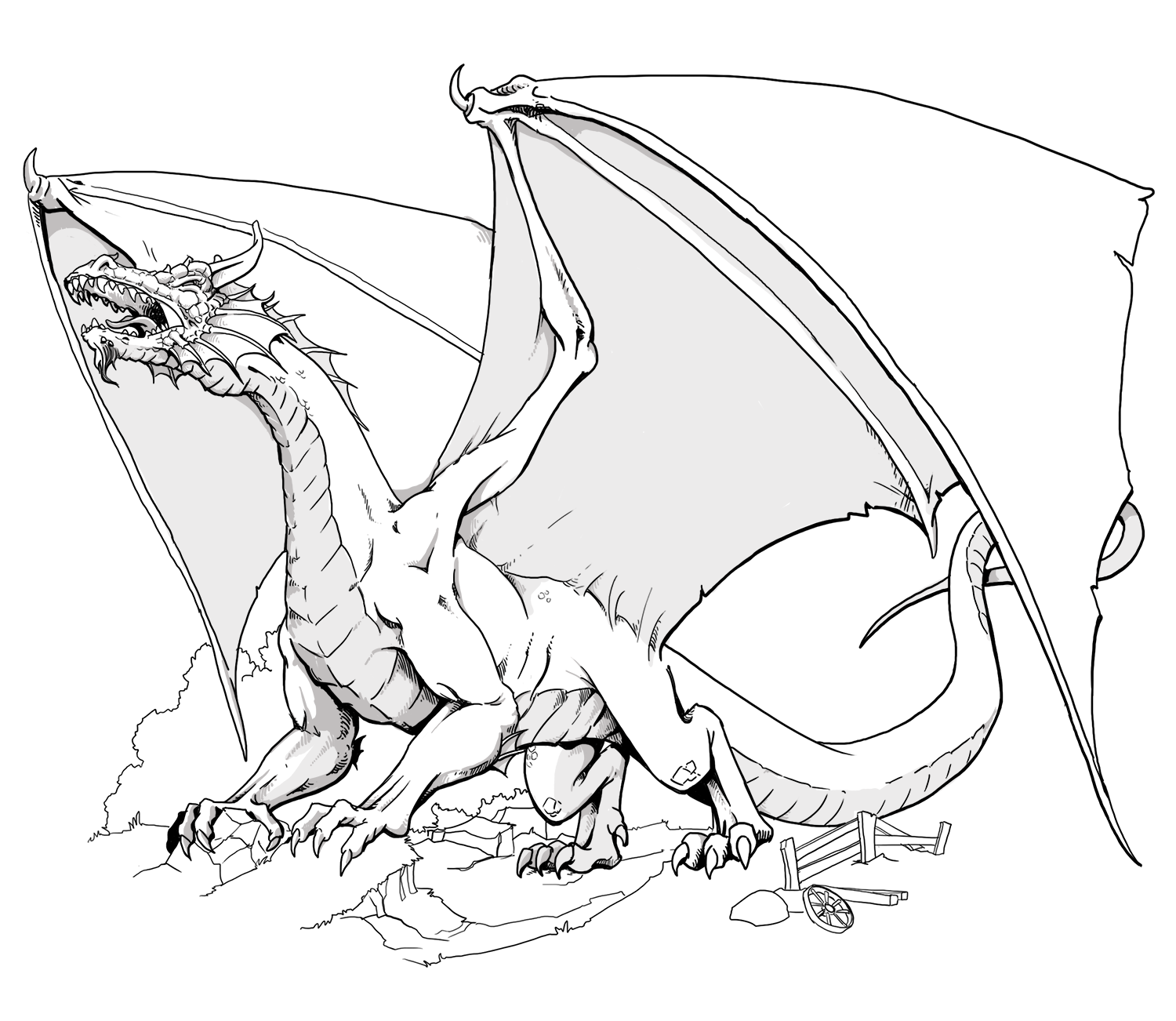
Representation of a dragon as it appears in the fantasy role-playing game Dungeons & Dragons

This is a list of dragons in tabletop and video games. If there are many dragons, then only the most notable are mentioned.

== Dragons in video games ==
=== Roles ===
- Player character – The dragon is the main character, and is controlled by the player throughout all or most of the game. (IE Spyro, Trogdor)
- Playable character – The dragon is a character that, if selected, can be controlled. (IE Liu Kang)
- Companion - The dragon is a character that usually accompanies the player and can often be controlled as a riding mount. (IE Flammie, Azurda)
- Boss – The dragon is a boss that the player must defeat. (IE, Volvagia, Lord of the Lightning, Elder Dragons in Monster Hunter)
- Final Boss – The dragon is the final boss in the game. (IE Alduin, Ridley, Grigori, Jack of Blades, Deathwing, Ender Dragon, Singe)
- Optional Boss – The dragon is an optional boss.
- Playable Character Transformation – The dragon is an alternate form that the player character can take. (IE Kameo)
- Enemy – The dragon is a general enemy in the game.
- Trainable Monster – The dragon is a monster used in battle against other monsters. (IE 'Dragon type' Pokémon, 'Dramon's in Digimon)
- Supporting Character – The dragon helps the player at various points throughout the game. (IE Valoo, Paarthurnax)
- Unit – The dragon is a controllable battle unit in the game. (IE dragons in Warhammer Total War)
- Collectible Card – The dragon is a digital card in a digital collectible card game which can be obtained to customize and improve player's decks. (Dragons in Hearthstone, Clash Royale)
- Various – Dragons play multiple roles in the game.

=== Dragons in role-playing video games ===
Dragons appear in numerous role-playing games and their fictional settings as bosses, final bosses, and enemies, as well as player characters, companions, and supporting characters.

| Video game | Name of Dragon | Type | Transforms, if so from what? | Voice Actor | Role | Notes |
|---|---|---|---|---|---|---|
| Darksiders | Abaddon | European | Angel | Troy Baker | Final Boss | |
| AdventureQuest | Various | Various | No | | Various | |
| Adventures of Mana | Unnamed | European | No | | Boss | |
| Angels with Scaly Wings | Various | Various | No | | Various | Conceived from dinosaurs. |
| Xenoblade Chronicles | Alcar, Dragonia, Abaasy | European | No | | Boss | Dragon King Alcar, Demon King Dragonia, Avalanche Abaasy |
| The Elder Scrolls: Blades | Unnamed | Wyvern | No | | Enemies | |
| The Elder Scrolls V: Skyrim | Alduin, Paarthurnax, Odahviing | Wyvern | No | Daniel Riordan / Charles Martinet / Charles Dennis | Various | Many other named dragons appear. |
| Dragon's Crown | Ancient, Red Dragons | European | No | | Bosses | |
| Borderlands 2 | Ancient Dragons of Destruction | European | No | | Bosses | |
| Drakengard | Angelus, Legna | Wyvern | No | | Companion, Boss | |
| Drakengard 2 | Angelus, Legna | Wyvern | No | | Companion, Boss | |
| Drakengard 3 | Michael/Mikhail, Gabriella | Wyvern | No | | Companion | |
| I of the Dragon | Annoth, Barroth, Morrogh | European | No | | Player Character | The three main player characters. |
| Emerald Dragon | Atrushan | European | Human | | Player Character | A young blue dragon that transforms between his dragon form and an acquired human form to rescue Tamryn, his childhood human friend and sibling. |
| Elden Ring | Dragonlord Placidusax, Lichdragon Fortissax, Ancient Dragon Lansseax | Western | No | | Bosses | Various dragons appear throughout the game as enemies. |
| Avernum/Exile | Various | European | No | | Various | |
| Dragon Valor | Azi Dahaka | Various | No | | Bosses | Other dragons appear. |
| Final Fantasy series | Bahamut | European | No | | | The most recurrent of the many dragons that appear throughout the series |
| Valkyrie Profile 2 | Bahamut | European | No | | Boss | |
| Zelda II: The Adventure of Link | Barba | Serpentine | No | | Boss | |
| Battledragons | Unnamed | Various | No | | Units | |
| Shining Force | Bleu | European | No | | Playable Character | Other dragons appear |
| Blue Dragon | Blue Dragon | Other | No | | Companion | |
| Super Paper Mario | Bonechill, Fracktail, Wracktail | European | No | | Bosses | Fracktail and Bonechill are required bosses, while Wracktail is an optional boss. |
| Kingdom of Loathing | Bonerdagon | Wyvern | No | | Boss | |
| Paper Mario: The Thousand-Year Door | Bonetail, Gloomtail, Hooktail | European | No | | Bosses | Hooktail and Gloomtail are required bosses, while Bonetail is an optional boss. |
| Bravely Default | Various | European | No | | Bosses | |
| Two Worlds II | Cassara | European | Human | Sandra Pascuzzi | Final Boss | |
| Star Ocean: Till the End of Time | Crosell | European | No | | Boss | |
| Super Mario RPG | Czar Dragon, Zombone, Bahamutt | European | No | | Bosses | |
| Divinity: Original Sin | Various | European | No | | Various | |
| Divinity II | The Dragon Knight | Wyvern | Human | | Playable Character Transformation | Other dragons appear. |
| Dark Souls | Various; Black Dragon Kalameet, Darkeater Midir, Seath the Scaleless | Various | Various | | Bosses | |
| Dawn of the Dragons | Various | European | No | | Various | |
| Disgaea | Various | Various | No | | Units | |
| The World Ends with You | Draco Cantus | Asian | Human | Shane Johnson | Final Boss | |
| Mario & Luigi: Superstar Saga | Dragohoho | European | Beanish (humanoid species) | | Boss | |
| Mother | Dragon | Wyvern | No | | Boss | The party must have either obtained four melodies or reached level 25 to fight it. |
| Dragon Age | Various | European | Various | | Various | |
| Dragon Buster | Unnamed | European | No | | Boss | |
| DragonFable | Various | European | No | | Companion | |
| Chrono Cross | Dragon Gods | Various | No | | Bosses | There are six Dragon Gods. |
| Titan Quest | Dragon Liche | European | No | | Optional Boss | |
| Tiny Tina's Wonderlands | Various | Wyverns | No | | Enemies, mini-bosses, and companions | |
| Dragon Quest | Dragonlord | European | Human | | Final Boss | |
| White Knight Chronicles | Dragon Matriarch | European | Human | | Boss | |
| Shining Tears | Dragonutes | Various | No | | Various | |
| Drakkhen | Various | European | No | | Bosses | |
| Dungeon Crawl Stone Soup | Various | European | No | | Enemies | |
| Faria: A World of Mystery and Danger! | Unnamed | European | Human | | Final Boss | |
| Fate | Unnamed | European | No | | Bosses | |
| Marvel: Ultimate Alliance | Fin Fang Foom | Alien, quadrupedal | No | | Boss | |
| The Battle for Wesnoth | Fire Dragon | European | No | | Units | |
| Fire Emblem | Various | European | Human | | Various | |
| Secret of Mana, Dawn of Mana | Flammie | European | No | | Companion | A white four-winged fluffy dragon which the characters ride. Some eventually become the Mana Beast. |
| Golden Sun | Fusion Dragon | European (2H) (Note: Two-headed dragon) | Human | | Final Boss | |
| Enclave | Fyrlakith | European | No | | Boss | Appears in the level "The Guardian" |
| Popolocrois | Gaba, Sania | European | Human | | Companion | |
| Gothic II | Various | European | No | | Bosses | |
| Atelier Iris 2: The Azoth of Destiny | Gray | Asian | Human | | Playable Character | Was turned into a dragonman by the Dragon King Ardgevald/ |
| Lunar: Silver Star Story Complete | Green Dragon | Serpentine | No | | Boss | |
| Dragon's Dogma | Grigori | European | No | | Final Boss | Devours the Hero's heart to become an arisen |
| King's Field | Guyra, Seath | European | No | | Bosses | |
| Riviera: The Promised Land | Hades | European | No | | Optional boss | |
| Odin Sphere | Hindel, Belial, Wagner, Leventhan | Wyvern | No | | Bosses | |
| God of War (2018 video game) | Hræzlyr, Fafnir, Reginn, Otr, Dagsetr | European | No, Dwarf, No, No, No | | Various | |
| God of War Ragnarok | Various | Various | No | | Various | Several Drakes, Wyverns and dragon-like Lindwyrms and Dreki appear in the game. |
| Icewind Dale: Heart of Winter | Icasaracht | European | No | | Final Boss | |
| Ni no Kuni II: Revenant Kingdom | Incineraptor | European | No | | Boss | |
| Fable: The Lost Chapters | Jack of Blades | European | Demon | Keith Wickham | Final Boss | Initially a masked hooded figure, he is reincarnated in the Lost Chapters as a dragon. |
| Legacy of the Wizard | Keela | European | No | | Final Boss | |
| Kingdom Hearts | Various | European | Human | | Various | |
| King's Bounty: The Legend | Various | European | No | | Units | |
| Megami Tensei | Kuzuryu, Seiryu, Samael | Various | No | | Bosses | |
| The Last Remnant | Various | European | No | | Bosses | |
| The Legend of Dragoon | Various | Other | No | | Bosses | |
| Dragon Quest VIII | Lord of the Dragovians | European | Human | | Boss | Dragon form changes color. |
| Lost Kingdoms | Various | European | No | | Bosses | |
| Lufia | Egg Dragon | European | No | | Boss | |
| Mario + Rabbids Kingdom Battle | MegaDragonBowser | European | Bowser | Kenneth W. James | Final Boss | |
| Mother 3 | Mecha Drago | European | Drago | No | Boss | |
| The Elder Scrolls IV: Oblivion | Martin Septim | Wyvern | Human | Sean Bean | Supporting Character | Transforms into the Avatar of Akastosh. |
| Might and Magic | Various | European | No | | Various | |
| Monster Rancher | Unnamed | European | No | | Trained Monster | |
| Neverwinter Nights | Various | European | No | | Various | |
| Pokémon series | Various | Various | Various | | Trainable Monsters | Some Pokémon who are not dragons in their base forms can transform into one in various ways. Others are not dragons originally, but can evolve into a Dragon-Type Pokémon. |
| Palworld | Various | Various | No | | Trainable Monsters | |
| Ogre Battle | Various | European | No | | Various | |
| Lunar series | Quark | European | No | Hal Delahousse | Supporting Character | |
| Tower of Druaga | Quox | European | No | | Boss | |
| Radiata Stories | Various | Various | No | | Bosses | |
| I Am Setsuna | The Reaper | European | Human | | Final Boss | |
| Legend of the Red Dragon | Red Dragon | European | No | | Final Boss | |
| Breath of Fire | Ryu | European | Human | | Player Character | |
| Sacred | Various | European | No | | Bosses | |
| The Witcher 2: Assassins of Kings | Saesenthessis | Various | Human | Eiry Hughes | Various | |
| Grandia 3 | Shiba | Wyvern | No | | Supporting Character | Owned by Ulf. |
| Shin Megami Tensei | Various | Various | No | | Bosses | A race of demons. |
| Suikoden | Various | Various | No | | Bosses | Controlled by Dragon Knights. |
| Dungeons & Dragons: Shadow over Mystara | Synn | European | Human | | Final Boss | Female red dragon. |
| Tears to Tiara | Various | European | No | | Bosses | |
| Thousand Arms | Various | Various | No | | Bosses | |
| 7th Dragon | Tiamat | Western | No | | Boss | |
| Tales of Zestiria | Tiamat | European | No | | Boss | |
| Alundra 2: A New Legend Begins | Tirion | European | No | Neil Ross | Companion | |
| The Lord of the Rings: War in the North | Urgost | European | No | Keith Szarabajka | Supporting Character | |
| Vagrant Story | Various | Various | No | | Bosses | |
| Hydlide | Varalys | European | No | | Final Boss | |
| Paper Mario: The Origami King | Water Vellumental | European | No | | Boss | A blue, origami dragon that is the second Vellumental fought. Olivia gains its powers when Mario defeats it. |
| The Witcher 3: Wild Hunt | Various | Various | No | | Beasts | |
| Wizardry | Various | Various | No | | Bosses | |
| Wild Arms series | Zephyr | European | No | | Boss | Other dragons appear. |
| Golden Treasure: The Great Green | Spiritkeeper | Wyvern | No | | Player Character | Many other dragons, known as the Draak-Kin, appear throughout the story. |

=== Dragons in multiplayer online games ===
| Video game | Name of Dragon | Type | Transforms, if so from what? | Voice Actor | Role | Genre | Notes |
|---|---|---|---|---|---|---|---|
| Brawlhalla | Ragnir | European | No | | Player character | Fighting | |
| World of Warcraft | Alexstrasza, Deathwing (formerly known as Neltharion), Kalecgos, Korialstrasz, Malygos, Nozdormu, Onyxia, Sapphiron, Soridormi, Sindragosa, Sintharia, Tyranastrasz, Ysera | European | Human | | Leader of flights / Bosses | MMORPG | |
| Heroes of the Storm | Alexstrasza, Chromie (Chronormu), Deathwing, Dragon Knight | European | Human / Gnome / No / Hero | Wendee Lee / Karen Strassman | Player Characters | MOBA | Dragon Knight is a Playable Character Transformation on the Dragon Shire battleground. Heroes can liberate the Dragon Knight by activating the shrines and interacting with the Knight's statue in the middle lane of the battleground, taking control of him temporarily. |
| Phantasy Star | Alterazgohg, Sil Dragon | Various | No | | Bosses | MMORPG | |
| Counter-Strike Online | Angra | European | Dione | | Boss / Playable class | First-person shooter | Appears as a boss in Zombie Scenario Season 2, and as playable class in Zombie Giant. |
| Dota 2 | Auroth (the Winter Wyvern), Davion (the Dragon Knight), Jakiro (the Twin Head Dragon), Puck (the Faerie Dragon), Viper (the Netherdrake) | Wyvern / European / European (2H) / Fae / Amphithere | Human / Human / No / No / No | Merle Dandridge / Tony Todd / Dave Fennoy / Jen Taylor / Tony Todd | Player characters | MOBA | Auroth, the Winter Wyvern, transforms from a human in Dota: Dragon's Blood. Davion, the Dragon Knight, gained the ability to transform into a Dragon after slaying the Dragon Slyrak. Jakiro, the Twin Head Dragon, has two heads, with one breathing fire and the other breathing ice. |
| Final Fantasy XIV | Bahamut, Midgardsormr, Nidhogg, Hraesvelgr, Tiamat, Twintania, Shinryu, Vrtra, Azdaja | European | No | | Bosses | MMORPG | Includes dragons in the Heavensward expansion pack |
| Dungeon Fighter Online | Bakal | European | No | | Boss | MMORPG | |
| Dragon's Prophet | Various | European | No | | Companion | MMORPG | |
| Drakensang Online | Various | European | No | | Bosses | MMORPG | |
| Vindictus | Elchulus, Siglint, Beokros | European | No | Greg Chun / Edward Bosco | Bosses | MMORPG | |
| RuneScape | Various | European | No | | Boss / Enemies / Companion | MMORPG | Wyverns are also present, but are a separate race to dragons. |
| Free Realms | Various | Wyvern | No | | Player Companion | MMORPG | |
| Wizard101 | Black Dragon, Catalan, Jabberwock, Mother Drake, Pendragon, Three Color Seprent, White Dragon, Zarathax | European | No | | Boss / Enemies / Companion | MMORPG | |
| Hearthstone | Various | Various | Various | | Collectible Cards | Digital collectible card game | |
| Maplestory | Horntail | European (3H) (Note: Three-headed dragon) | No | | Boss | MMORPG | Many other dragons appear throughout the game. |
| EverQuest | Lord Nagafen, Trakanon, Lady Vox | European | No | | Boss | MMORPG | |
| Mabinogi | Various | Various | No | | Bosses | MMORPG | |
| Istaria: Chronicles of the Gifted | Named by player | European | No | | Player Character / Bosses | MMORPG | Can be created and customized by paid membership players and grow up from hatchling to adult to ancient dragons. |
| Awesomenauts | Nibbs | European | No | | Playable Character | MOBA | |
| Guild Wars 2 | Primordus, Jormag, Zhaitan, Mordremoth, Kralkatorrik, Soo-Won | Various | No | | Bosses | MMORPG | Elder Dragons who have been dormant for centuries and have now awoken to unleash a cycle of destruction upon Tyria, the world in which the game is set. They each have control over an element. |
| ArcheAge | Red Dragon | European | No | | Boss | MMORPG | |
| League of Legends | Shyvana | European | Humanoid | Karen Strassman | Player Character | MOBA | A playable champion whose ultimate allows her to temporarily transform into a dragon. |
| TERA | Various | Various | No | | Player Companion | MMORPG | |
| Aion: Upheaval | Tiamat, Stormwing, Beritra, Ereshkigal | European | Human | | Final Boss | MMORPG | |
| Tibia | Various | European | No | | Enemies | MMORPG | |
| Ultima Online | Various | Various | No | | Units | MMORPG | |
| Lineage 2 | Valakas, Antharas, Lindvior | European | No | | Bosses | MMORPG | Antharas is the Earth Dragon, Valakas is the Fire Dragon, and Lindvior is the Wind Dragon. |
| Realm of the Mad God | Pyyr, Nikao, Limoz, Feargus, Ivory Wyvern | Various | No | | Bosses | MMORPG | |
| Club Penguin | Scorn the Dragon King | Other | No | | Boss | MMO | Appeared in the Medieval Party 2012, in which he took over Club Penguin Island and took the Mountain of Misery as his lair. |
| Club Penguin Island | Scorn the Dragon King | Other | No | Toby Hulse | Boss | MMORPG | Appeared in the Medieval Party 2018. |
| League of Legends | Smolder | European | No | Kristina Atanasoski | Player Character | MOBA | |
| Day of Dragons | Various | Various | No | | Playable Character | Survival | |
| Draconia | Various | Various | No | | Playable Character | Survival | |

=== Dragons in other video game genres ===
| Video game | Name of Dragon | Type | Transforms, if so from what? | Voice Actor | Role | Notes |
|---|---|---|---|---|---|---|
| Dragon Spirit | Amur | Wyvern | Human | | Player Character | A captain from the kingdom, who transforms into a dragon to fight the evil Zawell. |
| ActRaiser | Arctic Wyvern | Wyvern | No | | Boss | |
| Alisia Dragoon | Dragon Frye, Ball O' Fire, Thunder Raven, Boomerang Lizard | European | No | | Companions | |
| The Legend of Zelda: Twilight Princess | Argorok | Wyvern | No | | Boss | A Twilit dragon that is the boss of the City in the Sky dungeon. |
| Asghan: The Dragon Slayer | Various | European | No | | Bosses | |
| DragonHeart: Fire & Steel | Draco and others | European | No | | Companion and bosses | |
| Drakan: Order of the Flame | Arokh | European | No | Jeff McNeal | Companion | |
| Drakan: The Ancients' Gates | Arokh | European | No | David Scully | Companion | |
| Kameo: Elements of Power | Ash | European | Fairy | | Playable Character Transformation | An element of fire. |
| Dragon Breed | Bahamoot | Serpentine | No | | Companion | |
| Bakugan | Various | Various | Ball | | Trainable Monsters | |
| The Simpsons: Bart vs. the World | Unnamed | Asian | No | | Enemies | |
| Battle Chess II: Chinese Chess | Unnamed | Asian | Horse | | Player units | |
| The Incredible Toon Machine | Bik | European | No | | Non-playable | |
| Black Lamp | Unnamed | European | No | | Boss | |
| Far Cry 3: Blood Dragon | Blood Dragons | Wingless, Quadrupedal | No | | Enemies | Can shoot lasers from their eyes. |
| Super Princess Peach | Blizzaurus | European | No | | Boss | |
| Bomberman Wars | Bomber Dragon | European | No | | Unit | |
| Starbound | Bone Dragon | Wyvern | No | | Boss | |
| Yoshi's Story | Bone Dragon and serpentine dragons | European (3H) and serpentine dragons | No | | Boss | The Bone Dragon is an undead, skeletal dragon boss, while serpentine dragons appear in some levels as a form of transportation. |
| Bubble Bobble Series | Various | European | No | | Main Character | |
| The Sims | Burnie, Pyritie, Torch | European | No | | Player Companion | |
| Dragon Rage | Cael Cyndar | European | No | | Player Character | |
| Call of Duty: Black Ops III | Unnamed | Wyvern | No | | Various | Appearing exclusively in Zombies mode, dragons appear as a gameplay mechanic on the map Der Eisendrache, and both as a hazard and as a boss on the map Gorod Krovi. |
| The Cave | Unnamed | European | No | | Boss | |
| Banjo-Tooie | Chili Billi, Chilly Willy | European | No | | Bosses | Twin brothers; one breathes fire, while the other breathes ice. |
| Cobra Triangle | Unnamed | Serpentine | No | | Boss | |
| Colorful Dragon | Various | European | No | | Playable character and non-player characters | |
| Crimson Dragon | Various | Wyvern | No | | Player Character/companion | The paler rides dragons throughout the game. |
| Crash Bandicoot: The Wrath of Cortex | Various | European | No | | Boss / Enemy | |
| Darby the Dragon | Darby | European | | | Player character | |
| The Legend of Zelda: Tears of the Kingdom | Demon Dragon, Light Dragon | Asian | Ganondorf (Demon Dragon), Princess Zelda (Light Dragon) | | Boss and player character | |
| Digimon | Various | Various | No | | Trainable Monsters | |
| Disciples II: Dark Prophecy | Various | European | No | | Various | |
| Discworld | Unnamed | European | No | | Boss | |
| Donkey Kong 64 | Dogadon | Hybrid | No | | Boss | A dragonfly-dragon hybrid. |
| Master of Magic | Draconians | European | No | | Playable Character | |
| Castlevania: Lords of Shadow | Dracula | European | Vampire | Robert Carlyle | Player Character | Dracula can transform into a dragon for a powerful attack. |
| DuckTales: Remastered | Dracula Duck | Serpentine | Duck | Frank Welker | Boss | |
| Captain Toad: Treasure Tracker | Draggadon | Asian | No | | Boss | |
| Animal Crossing | Drago | Asian | No | | Supporting Character | A villager who can move into the player's village. |
| Wario's Woods | Drago | European | No | | Boss | |
| Sacrifice | Dragon | European | No | | Unit | |
| Shrek | Dragon | European | No | | Final Boss | |
| Viva Pinata | Dragonache | Other | No | | Breedable animal | Its color depends on the main landscape of the garden. |
| New Super Mario Bros. U | Dragoneel | Serpentine | No | | Enemies | |
| Donkey Kong: Jungle Climber | Dragon Kremling | Asian | No | | Boss | |
| Altered Beast | Dragon Man | European | Human | | Playable Character Transformation | |
| Dragonseeds | Various | Asian | No | | Trainable Monster | |
| Donkey Kong Jungle Beat | Dragon Slot | Serpentine | No | | Supporting Character | |
| Battle Realms | Dragon Spirit | Asian | No | | Unit | Summoned by the Dragon Clan. |
| Castlevania (recurring in series) | Dragon Zombie | European | No | | Bosses | |
| The Longest Journey, Dreamfall | Draic Kin | European | No | | Supporting Characters | Extraterrestrial sentient beings. |
| Endless Legend | Drakken | Wyvern | No | | Unit | |
| Star Fox Adventures | Drakor | European | No | | Boss | The fourth boss of the game. |
| The Lord of the Rings: The Battle for Middle-earth II | Drogoth | European | No | | Unit | |
| Forgotten Worlds | Dust Dragon | European | No | | Boss | |
| Earth Defense Force 2025 | Unnamed | European | No | | Enemies | |
| The Legend of Zelda: Skyward Sword | Eldin, Faron, Lanayru | Eastern | No | | Supporting Characters | |
| Minecraft | Ender Dragon | European | No | Not Voiced | Final Boss | A black dragon with purple eyes that inhabits The End. Name stated to be "Jean?" |
| Muck | Bob | European | No | | Final Boss | |
| Kirby's Epic Yarn | Fangora | European | No | | Boss | |
| Ghostbusters Genesis | Fire Dragon | Serpentine | No | | Boss | |
| The Great Circus Mystery Starring Mickey & Minnie | Dragon Pete | European | Cat | | Final Boss | After being defeated in his first form, a wizard, Pete transforms into a red dragon. |
| The Legend of Zelda: Breath of the Wild | Dinraal, Farosh, Naydra | Asian | No | | Bosses | |
| Wrath Unleashed | Flame/Frost Dragons | Lindworm | No | | Unit | |
| Dungeons & Dragons: Tower of Doom | Flamewing | European | No | | Superboss | |
| Blazing Dragons | Flicker | European | No | | Player character | |
| The King of Dragons | Gildiss | European | No | | Final Boss | |
| The Legend of Zelda | Aquamentus, Gleeok | European / (2H) | No | | Boss | |
| The Legend of Zelda: Phantom Hourglass | Gleeok | Serpentine (2H) | No | | Boss | Known in Japanese as 'Double-Headed Ice-Fire Dragon Gleeok' |
| Super Mario Galaxy 2 | Gobblegut | Serpentine | No | | Boss | Also fought in a harder fiery form. |
| Zork: Grand Inquisitor | Griff | European | No | Marty Ingels | Supporting Character | |
| Golden Axe: Beast Rider | Great Dragon | European | No | | Boss | |
| ActRaiser 2 | Greed | European | No | | Boss | |
| Cuphead | Grim Matchstick | European | No | | Boss | |
| Atari Adventure | Grundle, Rhindle and Yorgle | Asian | No | | Bosses | |
| Marvel's Guardians of the Galaxy | Fin Fang Foom | Alien | No | | Boss | |
| Harry Potter and the Goblet of Fire (video game) | Unnamed | Wyvern | No | | Enemy | |
| Haruka: Beyond the Stream of Time | Unnamed | Asian | No | | Supporting Character | |
| Kid Icarus: Uprising | Hewdraw | Serpentine (3H) | No | Danny Mann | Boss | |
| Heroes of Might and Magic series | Various | Various | No | | Units | Green dragon (Gold dragon, Emerald dragon), Bone dragon (Ghost dragon, Spectral dragon), Shadow dragon (Red dragon, Black dragon), Faerie dragon, Rust dragon, Crystal dragon, Azure dragon |
| Hoard | Unnamed | European | No | | Player Character | |
| Dragon Saber | Huey, Siria | Wyvern | Human | | Player Character | |
| Donkey Kong Country: Tropical Freeze | Ice Dragon | European | No | | Enemies | |
| Kirby's Dream Land 2 | Ice Dragon | Wingless, bipedal | No | | Boss | Breathes ice instead of fire. |
| American Dragon: Jake Long – Attack of the Dark Dragon | Jake Long | European | Human | | Player Character | |
| Weaving Tides | Kilim | Other (carpet dragon) | | | Companion | |
| Star Wars: Bounty Hunter | Krayt Dragon | Alien, wingless, quadrupedal | No | | Boss | |
| King's Quest | Unnamed | European | No | | Boss | |
| Kingdom II: Shadoan | Unnamed | European | No | | Boss | Will eat the main character if he does not solve a puzzle |
| Resident Evil Village | Lady Dimitrescu | Other | Vampire | Maggie Robertson | Boss | |
| Rastan | Laios, Hydra, and red dragon boss | European and serpentine | | | Bosses | |
| Lair | Various | European | No | | Companion | |
| Kirby's Return to Dream Land | Landia | Wyvern (4H) (Note: Four-headed dragon) | No | | Boss | Each of its four heads is able to split from the main body to form a smaller dragon. |
| Mortal Kombat | Liu Kang | Asian | Human | | Playable Character | He transforms into a dragon as part of a Fatality. |
| Wonder Boy III: The Dragon's Trap | Lizard Man | European | Human | | Playable Character Transformation | |
| Loom | Unnamed | European | No | | Boss | |
| Super Mario Odyssey | Lord of the Lightning | European | No | | Boss | Also known as the Ruined Dragon. |
| Nail 'n' Scale | Lore | European | No | | Boss | |
| Mega Man | Mecha Dragon | European | No | | Boss | |
| Sonic Heroes | Metal Overlord | Other | Robot | | Final Boss | The evolved form of Neo Metal Sonic; referred to as "Metal Madness" before reaching full power. |
| Sonic and the Black Knight | Mist, Earth Dragon | Various | No | | Boss | |
| Sonic Superstars | Great Dark Dragon/Black Dragon, Trip the Sungazer | Other | No / Lizard | | Final Boss / Playable Character Transformation | Listed as "Black Dragon" in game files, but referred to by fans as "Great Dark Dragon". It was sealed away by an ancient civilization prior to the game's events. Trip is able to transform into a golden-yellow dragon with the power of the Chaos Emeralds, allowing her to fly around and breathe fire. |
| Sorcer Striker | Miyamoto | European | No | | Playable Character | |
| Monster Hunter | Various | Various | No | | Bosses | |
| Monster Maulers | Unnamed | Serpentine | No | | Boss | |
| The Elder Scrolls Adventures: Redguard | Nafaalilargus | Wyvern | No | Jonathan Bryce | Boss | Calls himself "The Crown Jewel of the Empire". |
| Alcahest | Nevis | European | Human | | Playable character | |
| Neopets | Various | European | No | | Playable Character | |
| Age of Mythology | Nidhogg | European | No | | Unit | |
| The Legend of Zelda: Oracle of Seasons | Aquamentus, Onox | European / Wyvern | No / Human | | Boss / Final Boss | Aquamentus is the boss of the Gnarled Root Dungeon, while Onox's true form is the Dark Dragon. |
| Ōkami | Orochi, Yomigami | Asian (8H) (Note: Many-headed dragon) / Asian | No | | Boss / Supporting Character | |
| Panzer Dragoon (series) | Various | Various | No | | Companion | |
| Towdie | Quido | European | No | | Villain | |
| War of the Monsters | Raptros | European | No | | Playable Character | |
| Kirby Super Star | Red Dragon/Great Dragon | European | No | | Boss | A holographic dragon summoned by the Computer Virus boss. |
| Reign of Fire | Unnamed | Wyverns | | | Player characters, enemies and bosses | |
| Metroid series | Ridley | Other | No | | Final Boss | Reappears as Meta Ridley |
| Rock of Ages | Unnamed | European | No | | Boss | |
| Scooby-Doo! Unmasked | Unnamed | Asian | Mubber | | Boss | Zen Tuo's dragon. |
| Conan | Sand Dragon | Wingless, quadrupedal | No | | Boss | |
| The Lost Vikings 2 | Scorch | European | No | | Player character | |
| Subnautica | Sea Dragon | Alien | | | Enemy | |
| Simon the Sorcerer | Unnamed | European | No | | Supporting Character | |
| Dragon's Lair | Singe | European | No | | Final Boss | |
| Cave Story | Sky Dragons | European | No | | Bosses | |
| The Hobbit | Smaug | European | No | James Horan | Boss | |
| Lego The Hobbit | Smaug | Wyvern | No | | Boss | |
| Ninja Gaiden | Smaugan | European | No | | Boss | Other dragons appear throughout the game. |
| Diddy Kong Racing | Smokey | European | No | | Rival | |
| Demon's Crest | Somulo | European | No | | Boss | |
| Donkey Kong Jungle Beat | Space Dragon | Serpentine | No | | Obstacle | |
| Spyro series | Spyro, Cynder | European | No / Shadowy form, Explosive skull | Carlos Alazraqui, Tom Kenny, Jess Harnell, Elijah Wood, Josh Keaton, Matthew Mercer, Justin Long / Cree Summer, Mae Whitman, Christina Ricci, Tobie LaSalandra, Erica Lindbeck, Felicia Day | Playable Character | Spyro is a purple dragon capable of controlling all elements. He is classified as Magic element in Skylanders. Cynder is a former servant of Malefor in both versions, but the result of her corruption results in different effects on her. In The Legend of Spyro, she gains control over shadows, poison, fear, and wind, while in Skylanders, she is an Undead element Skylander capable of using spectral lightning, summoning ghosts, and turning into a shadow form. |
| Keio Flying Squadron | Spot | European | No | | Companion | |
| Summoners War: Sky Arena | Various | European | No | | Companion | |
| Super Smash Bros. | Super Dragon Yoshi | European | Dinosaur | Kazumi Totaka | Turns into a dragon with a powerup | |
| Super Ghouls 'n Ghosts | Unnamed | Asian (3H) | No | | Boss | |
| Syvalion | Unnamed | Asian | No | | Player character | |
| Space Harrier | Uriah | Asian | No | | Companion | |
| Devil World | Tamagon | Other | No | | Player character | |
| Thanatos | Thanatos | Wyvern | No | | Player Character | |
| Tomb Raider 2 | Unnamed | Asian | Human | | Boss | |
| How to Train Your Dragon | Toothless and various others | European | Yes | | Player characters and companions | |
| Total War: Warhammer | Various | European | No | | Units | |
| Total War: Warhammer II | Various | European | No | | Units | |
| Homestar Runner | Trogdor | Other | No | | Player character | Also known as The Burninator. |
| True Crime: Streets of LA | Unnamed | Asian | No | | Boss | |
| Fur Fighters | Tweek, Gwyneth | European | No | | Playable character | |
| The Legend of Zelda: The Wind Waker | Valoo | European | No | | Supporting Character | |
| Dragon Blade: Wrath of Fire | Valthorian, Jagira, Skaroth, Mobrius, Norgiloth, Vormanax | European | | | Companion and bosses | |
| Viking: Battle for Asgard | Various | European | | | Companions | |
| Hyrule Warriors | Volga | European | Human | | Boss, Playable Character | |
| The Adventure of Link | Volvagia | Asian | No | | Boss | |
| The Legend of Zelda: Ocarina of Time | Volvagia | Asian | No | | Boss | Also known as Subterranean Lava Dragon. |
| Zelda's Adventure | Warbane | Western | No | | Boss | |
| Ninja Gaiden II | Water Dragon | Aquatic Drake | No | | Boss | Also appears in Ninja Gaiden Sigma 2. |
| Wildlife Park: Ultimate Edition | Unnamed | European | No | | Player Character | Others |
| Wing War (Atari 2600) | Unnamed | European | No | | Player Character | |
| Doom Eternal | Wintherin | European | No | | Supporting Character | |
| Threads of Fate | Wylaf | European | No | | Supporting Character | |
| Terraria | Wyvern | Asian | No | | Enemy | Despite being called "wyverns", they resemble an Asian dragon. |
| Hype: The Time Quest | Zatila, Voydh | European | No | | Companion / Boss | |
| Zoids Series | Various | Various | No | | Various | |
| Freedom Planet | Sash Lilac | Alien | No | Dawn M. Bennett | Playable Character | A half-breed water dragon and one of the playable protagonists. |
| Freedom Planet 2 | Merga | Alien | No | Morgan Berry | Final Boss | The final boss of the game; she goes through five winged transformations during the battle. |
| Dragonriders: Chronicles of Pern | Various | European | No | | Companions | |

=== Dragons in games for mobile devices ===
There are a number of casual, idle, life simulation and other types of games for mobile devices involving dragons.

| Video game | Genre | Platform(s) | Notes |
|---|---|---|---|
| Candy Crush Saga | Puzzle | Android, iOS | Dragons appear as NPCs, starting with a giant, anthropomorphic, amphibious, bipedal Chinese dragon named Denize who debuted in the game's third episode. More than a decade later, her baby children get trapped in the game's levels and must be rescued using the game's tile-matching gravity mechanics to bring them to certain tiles to be freed. |
| Clash of Clans | Strategy | Android, iOS | Dragons are Units |
| Clash Royale | Strategy | Android, iOS | Dragons are Collectible Cards |
| Dragon City | Social network game | Android, iOS, Facebook | |
| Dragon Mania Legends | Casual | Android, iOS, Windows | |
| Dragon Story | Life simulation | Android, iOS | Dragon Story is a game where the player breeds and discovers many dragon species on an island known as the Dragon Islands. The dragons must be fed with food from the farms. Dragon types include Red, Green, Yellow, Blue, Purple, White, Pink, and Black. |
| Puzzle & Dragons | Puzzle | Android, iOS, Amazon Fire | The player collects dragons as a reward for completing the game's dungeons or spending in-game currency. |
| Raid: Shadow Legends | Strategy | Android, iOS PC | Wyvern bosses |
| Tap Zoo | Idle | Android, iOS | |
| Tiny Zoo | Simulation | iOS | |
| Zoo Craft: Animal Family | Simulation | Android, iOS | |
| Zoo Story 2 | Casual | Android, iOS | |

=== Mods that add dragons to games ===
Thanks to Modding tools in various games, players and developers have been able to add dragons to various games that did not have them before.

| Video game | Mod | Type | Transforms, if so from what? | Role | Notes |
|---|---|---|---|---|---|
| Minecraft | Dragon Survival | European | No | Playable character | This global mod completely changes your gameplay and focuses it on transforming into one of three types of dragon |
| Starbound | Futara's Dragon Race | European | No | Playable character | Adds the new race "FutaraDragon". An actual 4 legged dragon that's fully recolorable. |
| Baldur's Gate 3 | Half-Dragon | European | Human/Half-elf | Playable Character Transformation | A Half-Dragon race, based on a completely homebrew ruleset and worldsetting. Features ability to take a Dragon form, as well as a unique new strong female bodytype. |

== Dragons in tabletop games ==
=== Dragons in tabletop role-playing games ===
- Dragons are common (especially as non-player characters) in Dungeons & Dragons and in some fantasy role-playing video games. They, like many other dragons in modern culture, run the full range of good, evil, and everything in between. In Dungeons and Dragons, the color of the dragon shows if it is evil or good. Metallic dragons are forces of good and they are led by the mighty dragon-god Bahamut. Chromatic dragons are evil creatures ranging from white (the weakest) to the mighty red (the strongest). The chromatic dragons revere Tiamat, a five-headed dragon-god with heads of each color of the evil dragon (red, blue, green, white, black).
- Various Great Feathered Serpent dragons, Great Eastern dragons, Great Western dragons, Great Sirrush dragons, and others in Shadowrun
- Various types of dragons found in the Rifts role-playing game.
- Various Great Western dragons and others in Earthdawn

=== Dragons in board games ===
- Red, green and white dragon tiles in Mahjong.
- Darkfyre in DragonStrike (board game)
- Dragon chess, a three-board chess variant designed by Gary Gygax, has a dragon piece.
- Big Snore, the sleepy purple title dragon from Don't Wake the Dragon!, a mid-1980s children's board game
- Carcassonne - The Princess & the Dragon, an expansion for Carcassonne (board game), centers around a dragon represented by a large wooden piece
- Mimring (the evil red dragon), Charos (the green dragon), Braxas (the black dragon queen), and Niflhelm (the white dragon king) are some of the most powerful characters in Heroscape.
- Wyrmspan is a card game in which the player entices dragons into their hand. The game comes with a booklet of lore about each type of dragon featured in the game.
- The Tea Dragon Society Card Game is a game which includes the dragons from Kay O'Neill's Tea Dragon Society graphic novels. The gameplay simulates the players taking care of Jasmine, Gingseng, Rooibos and Camomile (the 4 dragons in the game).

=== Dragons in card games ===
Fantasy card games often feature dragons, often many of them, and thus this sub-section only mentions the more popular or important ones.

==== Magic: The Gathering ====
Dragon is a creature subtype in Magic: The Gathering.

- The Primeval Dragons in the Invasion block, namely Crosis, the Purger; Darigaaz, the Igniter; Dromar, the Banisher; Rith, the Awakener and Treva, the Renewer
- The Elder Dragon Legends from the Legends block, namely Arcades Sabboth, Chromium, Nicol Bolas, Palladia-Mors and Vaevictis Asmadi
- Draco, an extremely powerful artifact dragon, that has the highest mana cost in the game (16 colorless mana).
- Rorix Bladewing, a Shivan dragon who fights in the Otarian Grand Coliseum to reclaim his nation's honor: upon his death, Rorix is reincarnated as a "dracolich", under the name Bladewing the Risen.
- The Guardian Ryuu of Kamigawa, including Jugan, the Rising Star; Keiga, the Tide Star; Kokusho, the Evening Star; Ryusei, the Falling Star; and Yosei, the Morning Star.
- Niv-Mizzet, the insightful but short-tempered dragon wizard and leader of the Izzet League.
- The Planar Chaos set introduces a new cycle of legendary Dragons bearing many similarities to the Invasion cycle - Oros, the Avenger; Intet, the Dreamer; Teneb, the Harvester; Numot, the Devastator; and Vorosh, the Hunter.
- The Future Sight set contains a legendary dragon called Tarox Bladewing in its "futureshifted" sheet. Tarox is apparently the son of the above-mentioned Rorix Bladewing, and according to his flavour text, "despises his siblings as insults to his line, finding and devouring each in turn". According to the magicthegathering.com article that previewed Tarox, he wants to be just like his father Rorix - although smaller than his father, Tarox's controller can discard another Tarox from their hand to double his size, making him a far heavier hitter than Rorix.
- There are also numerous other dragons, which have appeared in almost every set and every block. The most notable such dragon is Shivan Dragon, which has appeared in all but one of the Magic Core Sets.

==== World of Warcraft Trading Card Game ====
- World of Warcraft Trading Card Game features many dragons from Warcraft universe, including Onyxia, Deathwing, Alexstrasza and all the other Aspects.

==== Diablo ====
- Tathamet in Diablo is the First Ultimate and True Prime Evil and Seven Headed Dragon who battle Anu and also create Seven Great Evils from his heads and Hell.

==== Yu-Gi-Oh! ====
Dragon is also a monster type in the Yu-Gi-Oh! Trading Card Game. Dragons in Yu-Gi-Oh! include:

- The Blue-Eyes White Dragon and its incarnations, including Paladin of White Dragon (A ritual monster and younger version of Blue Eyes), Blue-Eyes Ultimate Dragon (the fusion of three Blue-Eyes White Dragons), Dragon Master Knight (A fusion monster composed of Black Luster Soldier and Blue-Eyes Ultimate Dragon) and Blue-Eyes Shining Dragon, and Blue-Eyes Toon Dragon (A Toon version of the Blue-Eyes White Dragon).
- The Red-Eyes B. Dragon, and its incarnations, including Red-Eyes B. Chick, Paladin of Dark Dragon (A ritual monster and younger version of Red Eyes, but called Knight of Dark Dragons in the anime), Lord of the Red (A ritual monster and almost a human form of Red Eyes), Red-Eyes Wyvern, Red-Eyes Black Metal Dragon, Red-Eyes Darkness Dragon, Red-Eyes Darkness Metal Dragon, and its many Fusion monsters.
- Baby Dragon which morphs into Thousand Dragon using Time Wizard. In the TCG/OCG, Thousand Dragon is a Fusion monster with Time Wizard and Baby Dragon and its materials.
- Curse of Dragon and its Fusion form Gaia the Dragon Champion (A fusion monster composed of Gaia the Fierce Knight and Curse of Dragon)
- Slifer the Sky Dragon (Sky Dragon of Osiris), the Egyptian god Osiris card avatar.
- The Winged Dragon of Ra
- The Eye of Timaeus, The Fang of Critius, and The Claw of Hermos, and their human knight counterparts; the Legendary Dragon Cards|Three Legendary Dragons
- Cyber Dragon variants, though actually classed as Machine type monsters, can easily be compared to the Blue-Eyes White Dragon.
- Rainbow Dragon, the Crystal Lord, and Rainbow Dark Dragon
- Chaos Emperor Dragon - Envoy of the End
- White Night Dragon
- Five-Headed Dragon (originally known as F.G.D.)
- The Five Dragons linked to the Signers: Stardust Dragon, Red Dragon Archfiend, Black Rose Dragon, Ancient Fairy Dragon, Black-Winged Dragon, and Life Stream Dragon. This also includes their "Buster/Assault Mode"(Stardust Dragon /Assault Mode and Red Dragon Archfiend / Assault Mode) "Majestic/Savior"(Majestic Star Dragon and Majestic Red Dragon) Cosmic Sychro Monster Forms(Shooting Star Dragon, Red Nova Dragon, and Cosmic Blazar Dragon, technically both Shooting Star Dragon and Cosmic Blazar Dragon are both Accel Synchro while Red Nova Dragon is Double Tuning) and Limit Over Accel Synchro(Shooting Quasar Dragon).
- Dragon Knight Draco-Equiste (A fusion monster composed of 1 Dragon-Type Synchro monster + 1 Warrior-Type monster)
- Hundred Eyes Dragon ( A dragon who serves the Earthbound Immortals)
- The Inca archetypes, Sun Dragon Inti and Moon Dragon Quilla
- Jormungardr The Nordic Serpent
- Several evolutionary dragons, such as Armed Dragons, Horus the Black Flame Dragon and some others.
- The Malefic Dragons the evil or the corrupted versions of the signature dragons throughout the Yu-Gi-Oh! series e.g. Malefic Stardust Dragon, Malefic Cyber End Dragon, Malefic Rainbow Dragon, Malefic Red-Eyes Black Dragon, Malefic Blue-Eyes White Dragon and most notably the Malefic Paradox Dragon and Malefic Truth Dragon.

==== Cardfight!! Vanguard ====
Several races and clans within the Cardfight!! Vanguard trading card game are heavily based around dragons. A few of the races that are based on dragons include:

- Flame Dragon, found only in the Kagero and Narukami clan this race is the typical fire breathing dragon archetype. Notable units include Dragonic Overlord, Dragonic Overlord the End, Dauntless Drive Dragon, Gattling Claw Dragon, and Vortex Dragon.
- Cosmo Dragon, a powerful race considered holy and usually associated with bringing judgment upon evil forces. Notable units include Soul Saver Dragon and Satellitefall Dragon.
- Abyss Dragon, the abyss dragons are known for their strength and willingness to sacrifice allied units to gain extra power. Notable units include: Phantom Blaster Dragon, Phantom Blaster Overlord, Spectral Duke Dragon, Revenger, Raging Form Dragon and Revenger, Dragruler Phantom
- Dino Dragon, unique to the Tachikaze clan. As their name would suggest, they appear more dinosaur-like than dragon-like. Notable units include Tyrant, Deathrex, Dragon Egg, and Sonic Noa.
- Winged Dragon, the typical flying dragon. Many of these units are mechanized. Notable units include Wyvern Strike, Tejas, Wyvern Strike, Jarran and Hex Cannon Wyvern.
- Dragonman, are units that share the features of both man and dragon. Notable units include Lizard Runner, Undeux, Wyvern Guard, Barri, and Demonic Dragon Berserker, Yaksha.
- Thunder Dragon, found only in the Narukami clan this race are dragons that are attacking with lightning or thunder base. Notable units include Dragonic Kaiser Vermillion, Dragonic Kaiser Vermillion "THE BLOOD", Eradicator, Vowing Sword Dragon and Eradicator, Dragonic Descendant.
- Cyber Dragon, found only in the Link Joker clan this race are mechanical looking dragons and capable of locking your opponents rear-guards. Notable units include: Star-vader, Mobius Breath Dragon, Gravity Ball Dragon, Gravity Collapse Dragon, Schwarzschild Dragon, Star-vader, Infinite Zero Dragon, Star-vader, Nebula Lord Dragon and Star-vader, Chaos Breaker Dragon.
- Tear Dragon, found in the clans of Kagero and but mostly Aqua Force these dragons are water-based attackers and can attack up to 3-5 times in 1 turn. Notable units include Blue Storm Dragon, Maelstrom, Blue Storm Supreme Dragon, Glory Maelstrom, Blue Flight Dragon, Trans-core Dragon, Last Card, Revonn, Blue Wave Dragon, Tetra-drive Dragon.
- Zeroth Dragons is a race featured on one card of each nation, The Zeroth Dragons are weapons of mass destruction born from the Dragon Deity of Destruction, Gyze. The apostles of Gyze plan to use these dragons to revive him. These dragons can be played to any clan that represents their nation and also if this Grade 4 units failed to attack your opponent's Vanguard you cannot use your G-Zone cards anymore during the Cardfight This units are United Sanctuary's Zeroth Dragon of Zenith Peak, Ultima, Dragon Empire's Zeroth Dragon of Inferno, Drachma, Star Gate's Zeroth Dragon of Destroy Star, Stark, Dark Zone's Zeroth Dragon of End of the World, Dust, Magallanica's Zeroth Dragon of Distant Sea, Megiddo and Zoo's Zeroth Dragon of Death Garden, Zoa.

==== Duel Masters Trading Card Game ====
- There are many cards focusing on dragons in Duel Masters such as the ones included in the Epic Dragons of Hyper Chaos set.

== See also ==
- List of dragons in film and television
- List of dragons in literature
- List of dragons in popular culture
- List of dragons in mythology and folklore
