= Farlanders (video game) =

2023 video game developed by Andriy Bychkovskyi

- Developer: Andriy Bychkovskyi
- Publisher: Crytivo
- Platforms: Windows, MacOS, Linux
- Release: January 17, 2023
- Genre: City-building game
- Mode: Single-player

Farlanders is a turn-based space colony city-building game set on Mars. It is of the strategy genre, having puzzle elements, the perspective is 2D and gridded, and the maps are procedurally generated. Terraforming is an integral part of the strategy for colonization. It has seven missions in total.

The player takes the role of Marco, a Martian (human) citizen that vlogs about his new job as the planet's official colony architect. The story revolves around Marco’s enthusiasm being worn down as he discover that the company he works for is untrustworthy.

The game starts on each new map by the construction of one base, to which everything—houses, factories, greenhouses, energy sources, water sources, etc. -- needs to be connected in some way: wires, and/or above-ground tunnels, and/or pipes. Since the map is procedurally generated, the precise layout of minerals, water, mountains, canyons, soil types, etc. is unpredictable.

As the colony grows, thus grows the demand on resources, and the player needs to choose carefully what to build, and where to build, like choosing between having greenhouses near a water source and increasing the food production rate and the workforce demand, or building a water pump and increasing the energy consumption. When the buildings leave few free space on the map, the player decisions on how to use it becomes crucial for the colony's success or failure to meet the goals of the mission.
