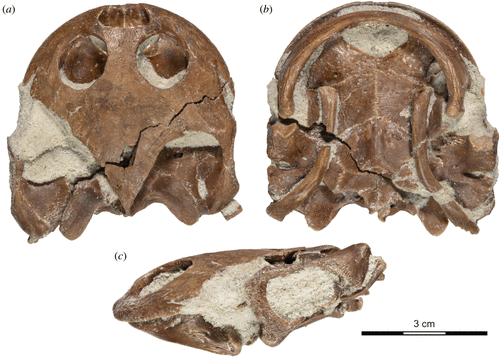
- Skull of Sahonachelys

Scientific classification
- Kingdom: Animalia
- Phylum: Chordata
- Class: Reptilia
- Order: Testudines
- Suborder: Pleurodira
- Hyperfamily: Pelomedusoides
- Family: †Sahonachelyidae; Joyce et al, 2021

Genera
- Sahonachelys; Sokatra

= Sahonachelyidae =

Sahonachelyidae Temporal range: 72–66 Ma

Extinct family of turtles

Sahonachelyidae is an extinct family of pelomedusoid turtles from the Late Cretaceous (Maastrichtian) Maevarano Formation of Madagascar. The clade was recognized in 2021 by Joyce et al., and contains two genera: Sahonachelys and Sokatra. The clade is characterized by the presence of a reduced contribution of the maxilla to the floor of the orbit, and, the presence of a distinct posterior process of the maxilla. The clade went extinct at the end of the Cretaceous period during the K-Pg extinction event.
