= Weaving Tides =

2021 video game

- Developer: Follow the Feathers
- Publisher: Crytivo Games
- Director: Verena Demel
- Producer: Klaus Fehkührer
- Designers: Klaus Fehkührer, Sebastian Rangger
- Programmer: Michael Huber
- Artists: Verena Demel, Klaus Fehkührer, Sebastian Rangger
- Writer: Verena Demel
- Composers: Timo Jagersberger, Frank Schlick
- Engine: Unity
- Platforms: Microsoft Windows, MacOS, Nintendo Switch
- Release: May 27, 2021
- Genres: Adventure, puzzle
- Mode: Single-player

Weaving Tides is a puzzle adventure video game developed by the Austrian developer Follow the Feathers. It was released on Windows, MacOS and Nintendo Switch on May 27, 2021.

== Gameplay ==
In Weaving Tides, players take control of a character who rides a dragon. The dragon's tail allows the player to do things like pulling an object, or connecting different parts of the world together. The focus of the game is using these weaving mechanics to interact with the world and solve puzzles. Combat is focused around using the dragons tail and diving beneath the world to stun and defeat enemies. There also are dungeons where the player makes their way through, completing puzzles and fighting enemies and eventually fighting a boss.

== Development ==
The game started development in 2017, after the developers' previous game NIVA, was completed in 2016. The project was funded with 150.000€ by the Vienna Business Agency in 2018. The developers say the game is inspired by games like Bastion, Tearaway and The Legend of Zelda series. On April 30, 2020 a Kickstarter campaign was created, which gathered 301% of its funding goal, resulting in 54.182 €, and a temporarily available free demo was released alongside it. The game was featured in the 2020 Wholesome Direct indie game showcase. The game was originally set to launch in Q4 2020, but was delayed into 2021 due to the COVID-19 pandemic. Weaving Tides was featured in Nintendo's Indie World Showcase in April 2021.

== Reception ==
Reception

Review scores
Publication	Score
Nintendo World Report	9/10
OpenCritic	80/100
TechRaptor	7/10

Weaving Tides was released on Steam (PC, Mac) and on Nintendo Switch on May 27, 2021. It received a "Strong" rating on Opencritic.

Nintendo World Report enjoyed how the gameplay focused around weaving, and wrote that they were "surprised by just how varied the enemy types were". While enjoying the game's puzzles, TechRaptor felt that the game's pacing was dragged down later "There's also a forced stealth segment in one of the later chapters that, while not difficult, is really slow and not much fun to play".

== Awards and recognition ==
During the development as well as post-release Weaving Tides was honored with various awards and nominations and was selected for several renowned showcases, including:

- Official Selection EGX Rezzed, Leftfield Collection - London, UK - 2018
- Winner ReVersed, PC Indie Pitch - Vienna, Austria - 2018
- Finalist Best International Indie Game Poznan Game Arena - Poznań, Poland - 2018
- Finalist Best Art Game Access Conference - Brno, Czech Republic - 2019
- Finalist Innovation BIG Festival - São Paulo, Brazil - 2019
- Official Selection Indie Arena Booth @ Gamescom - Cologne, Germany - 2019
- Official Selection FM4 Indie Area @ Game City - Vienna, Austria - 2019
- Best Adventure DreamHack Winter - Jönköping, Sweden - 2019
- 2nd Place (Pro Category) Game Development World Championship - online - 2019
- Official Selection Digital Dragons - online - 2020
- Finalist Excellence in Visual Art DevGamm - online - 2020
- Official Selection Indie Arena Booth @ Gamescom - online - 2020
- Finalist Innovation Ludicious - online - 2020
- Winner SAGA Awards - online - 2020
- Finalist Crowd-Funding Campaign of 2020 gamesindustry.biz Indie Publishing Awards - online - 2021
- Finalist Innovation Taipei Game Show - online - 2021
- Finalist Excellence in Visual Art DevGamm - online - 2021
- Finalist Best Game Design (Winner TBA) Develop:Star Awards - Brighton, UK / online - 2021
