= Crytivo =

Game publishing company

- Company type: Private company
- Industry: Video games
- Headquarters: San Diego, California, United States
- Products: The Universim, Prehistoric Kingdom, Weaving Tides
- Owner: Alex Koshelkov
- Website: crytivo.com

Crytivo is a game publishing company based in San Diego, California, founded by Alex Koshelkov in 2013.

== History ==
Crytivo was founded in 2013 by Alex Koshelkov. In April 2014, it launched a successful Kickstarter campaign for the game The Universim, raising over $387,000. The Universim was released via Steam Early Access on August 28, 2018, and the game received a full release on January 22, 2024.

Crytivo began publishing third-party games in early 2020. Their first third party release, Serin Fate (developed by Vethergen), was released via Steam Early Access in March 2020. Crytivo has signed additional indie development studios and solo developers, including Blue Meridian, Ironheart Studios, Rumata Lab, and Dazar Play. Projects currently under development include Villagedom.

In April 2023, Crytivo published Roots of Pacha on Steam. The following month, developer Soda Den sought to cancel their revenue-sharing contract, resulting in Steam delisting the game until the dispute was resolved. In late May 2023, Crytivo and Soda Den issued a joint statement that the publishing rights were being transferred to Soda Den.

== Games published ==
- Farlanders: Prologue
- Prehistoric Kingdom
- Serin Fate
- Today Is my Birthday
- The Last Shot
- The Universim
- Weaving Tides
- Trail Out
- Farlanders

== Upcoming releases ==
- Above Snakes
- A New Leaf: Memories
- Farm Folks
- Flea Madness
- Football Story
- Hotel Magnate
- Look Alive
- Power to the People
- Ratten Reich
- Rogue Shift
- Sayri: The Beginning
- Siege the Day
- Villagedom
- Wanderlost
- Autonomica
