= Sokatra =

Sokatra Temporal range: 70.6–66 Ma

Scientific classification
- Kingdom: Animalia
- Phylum: Chordata
- Class: Reptilia
- Order: Testudines
- Suborder: Pleurodira
- Family: †Sahonachelyidae
- Genus: †Sokatra; Gaffney and Krause 2011

Type species
- †Sokatra antitra Gaffney and Krause 2011

Extinct genus of turtle

Sokatra is an extinct genus of pleurodiran turtle, known from the Cretaceous (Maastrichtian) Maevarano Formation of Madagascar. It belongs to the family Sahonachelyidae.
