= Col Buchanan =

Northern Irish fantasy writer

- Born: Col Buchanan; 1973 (age 52–53); Lisburn, Northern Ireland
- Occupation: Novelist
- Website: www.colbuchanan.com

Col Buchanan (born 1973 Lisburn, Northern Ireland) is a Northern Irish fantasy writer. His first two books are Farlander and Stands a Shadow.

He lives in Lancaster, England.

== Works ==
Heart of the World series

1. Farlander (March 2010)
2. Stands a Shadow (July 2011)
3. The Black Dream (March 2015)
4. Fierce Gods (February 2017)

== Reviews ==
- Lisa Tuttle (April 10, 2010). "Sci-fi and fantasy by Alastair Reynolds, Col Buchanan, Peter Straub and Joe Hill". The Sunday Times.
- "‘Farlander’ – Col Buchanan (Tor UK)", Graeme's Fantasy Book Review, 25 February 2010
- "Farlander (2010), A novel by Col Buchanan", Fantastic Fiction
- Barnes & Noble Farlander (Tor 2010)
