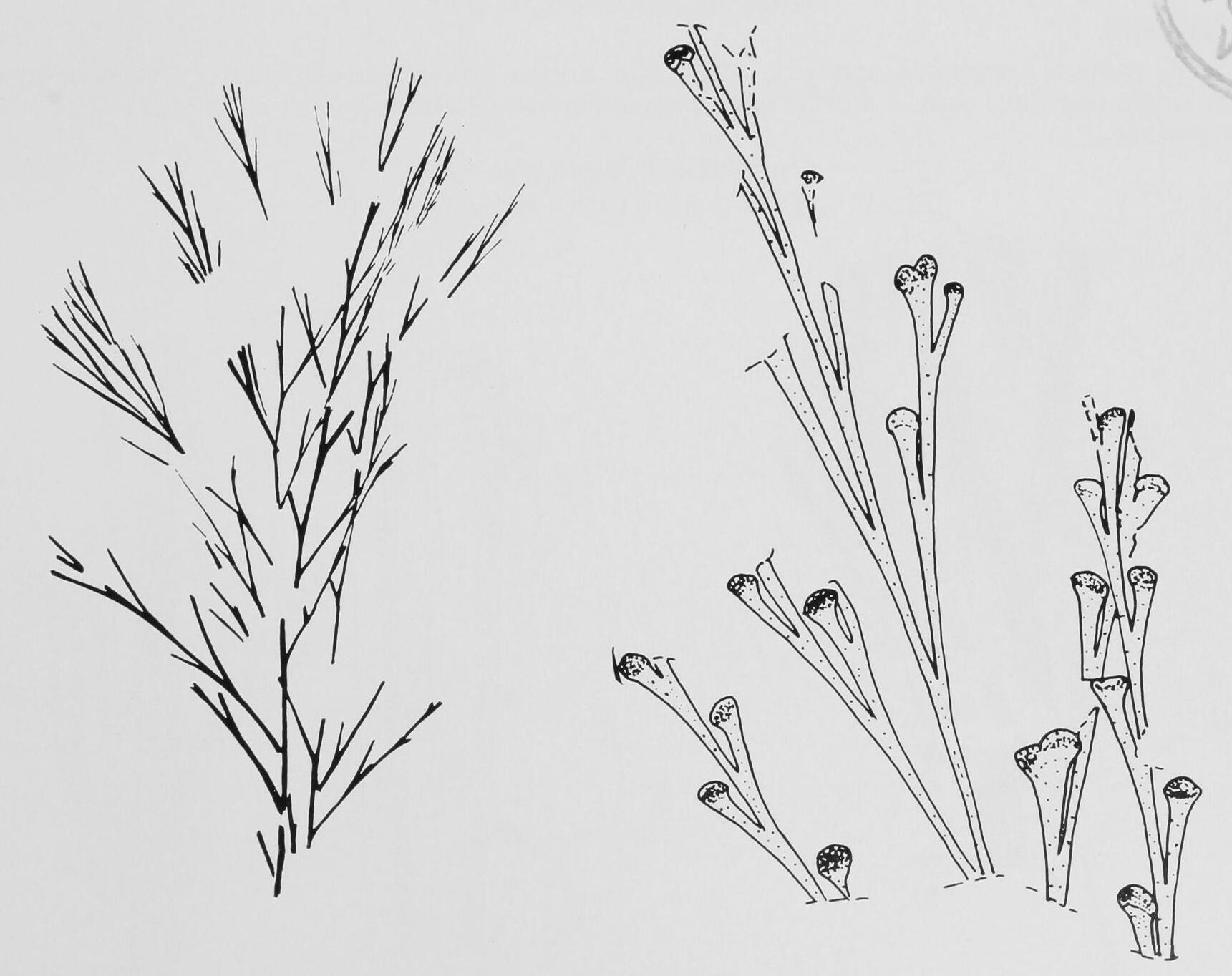
- Drawing of type species Aculea bifida from the protologue of the genus and species

Scientific classification
- Kingdom: Plantae
- Clade: Embryophytes
- Clade: Tracheophytes
- Division: Polypodiophyta
- Genus: †Aculea

= Aculea =

Aculea Temporal range: Cretaceous

Extinct genus of ferns

Aculea is an extinct genus of ferns known from the Cretaceous period, primarily identified through fossil records in places like Antarctica, Australia, and Patagonia. Additional mid-Cretaceous fern diversity studies in Patagonia have further documented the stratigraphic context of fern genera, including Aculea, within Cretaceous South American plant assemblages. It includes species such as Aculea acicularis, which formed upright thickets with fronds arising from subterranean rhizomes, often in environments dominated by araucarian trees and other large plants and floodbasins. Its fossils have also been recovered from floodbasin settings, notably from the Eumeralla Formation.

== Description ==
Fossil evidence suggests that individual plants could grow into dense thickets reaching up to 80 cm in height. A study of the Albian fern flora at Alexander Island in Antarctica placed Aculea within a diverse fern community thriving in Southern Hemisphere Cretaceous forests. The fronds were slender and rigid, bearing narrow, acicular (needle-like) pinnae. This morphology likely provided structural support in open or patchy forest environments.
