= Farlander =

2010 novel by Col Buchanan

- First edition
- Author: Col Buchanan
- Cover artist: Steve Stone
- Language: English
- Series: Heart of the World
- Genre: Fantasy
- Published: 2010 Tor Books
- Media type: Print
- Pages: 400 p
- ISBN: 978-0-7653-3105-2
- Followed by: Stands a Shadow

Farlander is the first book in the Heart of the World Series written by Col Buchanan.

The book follows the story of Ash, a member of a sect of assassins known as Rōshun, who offer protection through the threat of vendetta, and Nico, who is a street urchin lives in the city of Bar-Khos, which is under siege by the Holy Empire of Mann.

== Plot ==
The Heart of the World is a land in strife. For fifty years the Holy Empire of Mann, an empire and religion born from a nihilistic urban cult, has been conquering nation after nation. Their leader, Holy Matriarch Sasheen, ruthlessly maintains control through her Diplomats, priests trained as subtle predators.

The Mercian Free Ports are the only confederacy yet to fall. Their only land link to the southern continent, a long and narrow isthmus, is protected by the city of Bar-Khos. For ten years now, the great southern walls of Bar-Khos have been besieged by the Imperial Fourth Army.

Ash is a member of an elite group of assassins, the Roshun - who offer protection through the threat of vendetta. Forced by his ailing health to take on an apprentice, he chooses Nico, a young man living in the besieged city of Bar-Khos. At the time, Nico is hungry, desperate, and alone in a city that finds itself teetering on the brink.

When the Holy Matriarch’s son deliberately murders a woman under the protection of the Roshun; he forces the sect to seek his life in retribution. As Ash and his young apprentice set out to fulfil the Roshun orders – their journey takes them into the heart of the conflict between the Empire and the Free Ports . . . into bloodshed and death.
