= Ferugliotheriidae =

Ferugliotheriidae Temporal range: Late Cretaceous; Paleogene?

Scientific classification
- Kingdom: Animalia
- Phylum: Chordata
- Class: Mammalia
- Clade: †Gondwanatheria
- Family: †Ferugliotheriidae; Bonaparte, 1986

Type genus
- Ferugliotherium Bonaparte, 1986

Genera
- Argentodites?; Ferugliotherium; Magallanodon?; Trapalcotherium

Family of extinct mammals

Ferugliotheriidae is one of three known families in the order Gondwanatheria, an enigmatic group of extinct mammals. Gondwanatheres have been classified as a group of uncertain affinities or as members of Multituberculata, a major extinct mammalian order. The best-known representative of Ferugliotheriidae is the genus Ferugliotherium from the Late Cretaceous epoch in Argentina. A second genus, Trapalcotherium, is known from a single tooth, a first lower molariform (molar-like tooth), from a different Late Cretaceous Argentinean locality. Another genus known from a single tooth (in this case, a fourth lower premolar), Argentodites, was first described as an unrelated multituberculate, but later identified as possibly related to Ferugliotherium. Finally, a single tooth from the Paleogene of Peru, LACM 149371, perhaps a last upper molariform, and a recent specimen from Mexico, may represent related animals.

Ferugliotheriids are known from isolated, low-crowned (brachydont) teeth and possibly a fragment of a lower jaw. Ferugliotherium is estimated to have weighed 70 g (2.5 oz). The incisors are long and procumbent and contain a band of enamel on only part of the tooth. The jaw fragment contains a long tooth socket for the incisor and bears a bladelike fourth lower premolar, resembling those of multituberculates. The premolar of Argentodites is similar. Two upper premolars also resemble multituberculate teeth, but whether these premolars are referable to Ferugliotheriidae is controversial. Molariforms are rectangular and brachydont and consist of longitudinal rows of cusps, connected by transverse crests and separated by transverse furrows. Lower molariforms have two cusp rows, and the single known putative upper molariform has three. Low-crowned and bladelike teeth as seen in ferugliotheriids may have been evolutionary precursors of the high-crowned (hypsodont) teeth of the other gondwanathere family, Sudamericidae.

Most ferugliotheriids come from the Late Cretaceous epoch (Campanian–Maastrichtian ages, 84–66 million years ago, or mya) of Argentina, where they may have lived in a marshy or seashore environment. They coexisted with mammals such as dryolestoids and a variety of other animals, including dinosaurs. Ferugliotheriids may have been herbivores or omnivores.

== Taxonomy ==
The first member of the family Ferugliotheriidae to be discovered, Ferugliotherium windhauseni, was named in 1986 by Argentinean paleontologist José F. Bonaparte on the basis of a tooth from the Argentine Los Alamitos Formation of the Late Cretaceous. Bonaparte placed Ferugliotherium as the only member of the new family Ferugliotheriidae, which he tentatively assigned to the order Multituberculata, a large group of extinct mammals (distinct from both monotremes and therians, the two major groups of living mammals) that was particularly widespread in the northern continents (Laurasia), but had never previously been found in the south (Gondwana). In 1990, Bonaparte named another species, Vucetichia gracilis, from Los Alamitos. He placed it in the family Gondwanatheriidae, together with Gondwanatherium, another Los Alamitos mammal, within the order Gondwanatheria, which also contained the family Sudamericidae, then with the single genus Sudamerica. Bonaparte considered the gondwanatheres to be probably most closely related to the xenarthrans (sloths, armadillos, and anteaters) within a group called Paratheria.

Also in 1990, Bonaparte merged the family Gondwanatheriidae into Sudamericidae and, together with David Krause, redefined Gondwanatheria as a multituberculate suborder that included both Ferugliotheriidae and Sudamericidae, thus rejecting a relationship between gondwanatheres and xenarthrans. Krause, Bonaparte, and Zofia Kielan-Jaworowska redescribed Ferugliotherium in 1992 and suggested that the teeth that Vucetichia was based on may have been worn specimens of Ferugliotherium. They placed Ferugliotherium among multituberculates and suggested that it may be part of the suborder Plagiaulacoidea. The following year, Krause confirmed that Vucetichia gracilis is a synonym of Ferugliotherium windhauseni. Together with Bonaparte, he also proposed to classify gondwanatheres as a superfamily (Gondwanatherioidea) within Plagiaulacoidea, including the families Ferugliotheriidae and Sudamericidae. In 1996, Kielan-Jaworowska and Bonaparte tentatively identified a lower jaw fragment with a multituberculate-like fourth lower premolar (p4) from Los Alamitos as Ferugliotherium. On the basis of the morphological features of the jaw fragment, they argued that gondwanatheres are not closely related to any other multituberculate group, and consequently placed them in a suborder of their own, Gondwanatheria.

In 1999, Rosendo Pascual and colleagues described a lower jaw of Sudamerica, which had previously only been known from isolated teeth. This jaw fragment showed that Sudamerica had four molariform teeth on each side of the lower jaws, more than any multituberculate, and consequently they removed gondwanatheres from Multituberculata and regarded their affinities as uncertain. As a consequence, Kielan-Jaworowska and colleagues excluded Gondwanatheria from multituberculates, but identified the jaw fragment and a few upper premolars of Ferugliotherium as indeterminate multituberculates in a 2001 paper and a 2004 book. However, in 2009 Yamila Gurovich and Robin Beck identified these fossils as Ferugliotherium and argued in favor of a close relationship between gondwanatheres (including Ferugliotheriidae) and multituberculates.

In the 2000s, additional members of Ferugliotheriidae were described. In 2004, Francisco Goin and colleagues described a single enigmatic tooth from the Paleogene of Peru, LACM 149371; their best estimate was that it represented a member of Ferugliotheriidae. On the basis of a single p4, Kielan-Jaworowska and colleagues named Argentodites coloniensis, from the Late Cretaceous La Colonia Formation of Argentina, in 2007 as a multituberculate, possibly referable to the suborder Cimolodonta. Gurovich and Beck argued, however, that the p4 of Argentodites did not differ materially from that in the jaw they allocated to Ferugliotherium, and that Argentodites was based on a specimen of either Ferugliotherium or a closely related animal. Guillermo Rougier and colleagues described mammals from the Allen Formation, a third Argentinean formation of similar age, in 2009, including a new ferugliotheriid, Trapalcotherium matuastensis. They also regarded Argentodites as a likely relative of Ferugliotherium and suggested that Ferugliotheriidae are either multituberculates or closely related to them. Some studies have recovered Ferugliotheriidae as unrelated to the rest of Gondwanatheria, but instead nested within the Multituberculates.

== Description ==
Ferugliotheriids are known from a few dozen isolated teeth and a questionably allocated jaw fragment. Most fossils are referred to Ferugliotherium; Trapalcotherium and Argentodites were each described on the basis of a single tooth. Their precise dental formula is unknown, but incisors, premolars, and molariform teeth have been identified. Gurovich suggested that Ferugliotherium had one incisor (possibly two in the upper jaw), no canines, one or two premolars, and two molars on each side of the lower and upper jaws.

Unlike the very high-crowned (hypsodont) sudamericids, ferugliotheriid teeth were low-crowned (brachydont). Furthermore, sudamericid molariforms tend to be larger and are supported by one large root, but the smaller ferugliotheriids have at least two roots under their molariforms. Ferugliotherium is estimated to have weighed 70 g (2.5 oz).

The incisors, known only from Ferugliotherium, are procumbent and long. Three lower and four upper incisors are known. As is usual in mammals with similarly shaped (gliriform) incisors, the lower incisors are more laterally compressed, are less curved, form a greater angle between the front side and the wear facet at the tip, and are less elliptical in shape than the uppers. The enamel band is restricted to the side that faces the lips in both the lower and upper incisors (the lower side in the lowers and the upper side in the uppers).

The specimen MACN Pv-RN 975, first described by Kielan-Jaworowska and Bonaparte in 1996, may be a jaw fragment of Ferugliotherium, although it has also been identified as an unrelated multituberculate. The fossil preserves a bladelike premolar, identified as the fourth premolar, and the piece of the jawbone below it. A diastema (gap) is present between the premolar and the incisor that would have been located in front of it. The alveolus (socket) of the lower incisor extends all the way through the fossil. The p4 bears eight ridges on both sides of the longitudinal crest and is supported by two roots at the front and back. The p4 assigned to Argentodites also has eight ridges on both sides, which descend from cusps on the upper margin, and roots at the front and back. According to Kielan-Jaworowska and colleagues, it differs from that of MACN Pv-RN 975 in its rounded, as opposed to angular shape. However, Gurovich and Beck attribute this difference to the fact that the latter has undergone much more wear.

Two fossils have been interpreted as isolated lower premolars of Ferugliotherium, but neither is still regarded as such. Two other teeth have been identified as upper premolars of Ferugliotherium; as with the jaw fragment, they may also represent an indeterminate multituberculate. One of the two preserves two longitudinal rows of cusps, of which one contains four and the other at least two cusps. The other is more poorly preserved, but may represent the same tooth position. These teeth resemble multituberculate upper premolars.

Four putative first lower molariforms (mf1s) of Ferugliotherium are known, and the only known tooth of Trapalcotherium is also thought to be an mf1. Ferugliotherium mf1s are roughly rectangular, with rounded corners, and bear two longitudinal rows of cusps. There are four cusps in the lingual row (on the side of the tongue) and three in the labial row (the side of the lips). The cusps are connected to cusps in the other row by transverse ridges and separated from cusps in their own rows by three transverse furrows. Two heavily worn Ferugliotherium mf1s were originally identified as upper molars of Vucetichia gracilis by Bonaparte in 1990. One of the two preserves the roots; at the front and back, there were two roots, fused at their bases. The mf1 of Trapalcotherium differs only in some details; among others, the cusps are less distinct from the crests. The sole mf2 of Ferugliotherium is the holotype. It bears two rows of two cusps. The cusps in the front and back pairs are connected by a broad ridge and the two pairs are separated by a deep furrow. Transverse ridges between the cusps similar to those seen in ferugliotheriids are not known in any multituberculate. On the other hand, overall patterns of cusps and ridges are essentially similar among Ferugliotherium, Gondwanatherium, and Sudamerica, indicating that the three are closely related.

One Ferugliotherium tooth is thought to be a first upper molariform (MF1). It is almost rectangular and bears three longitudinal rows of cusps. There are five cusps in the middle row, which is oriented obliquely, four cusps in one of the rows on the side of the tooth, and two or three in the other row on the side. As in the lower molariforms, the cusps are connected by transverse ridges and separated by furrows. LACM 149371, the enigmatic possibly ferugliotheriid tooth from Peru, is a triangular tooth bearing six or seven cusps, which are connected by crests and surround two deep fossae (basins) and a third shallower fossa.

== Range, ecology, and evolution ==
With its low-crowned teeth, Ferugliotherium may have been an insectivore or omnivore, like similar multituberculates such as Mesodma, which is thought to have eaten insects, other arthropods, seeds, and/or nuts. The wear on Ferugliotherium teeth suggests that the animal may have eaten some plant material. The high-crowned sudamericids are thought to have been herbivores feeding on abrasive vegetation, although their precise diet is not known. In the evolutionary history of gondwanatheres, hypsodont teeth are thought to have evolved from brachydont precursors. Gurovich hypothesizes that the anterior molariforms of sudamericids may have evolved from bladelike premolars as seen in Ferugliotherium.

Fossils of Argentinean ferugliotheriids come from the Los Alamitos (Ferugliotherium), La Colonia (Ferugliotherium and Argentodites), and Allen Formations (Trapalcotherium). All three are approximately the same age, dating to the Campanian (84–71 mya) or more likely the Maastrichtian (71–66 mya), but the La Colonia Formation is perhaps a little younger. The Los Alamitos and Allen Formations may have been deposited in a marshy environments, and the depositional environment of the La Colonia Formations may have been an estuary, tidal flat, or coastal plain.

In each of the three formations, the mammalian fauna is dominated by the archaic group Dryolestoidea; the Los Alamitos Formation has also produced the sudamericid Gondwanatherium. Only seven mammalian teeth have been found in the Allen Formation. All three also contain remains of numerous other animals, including dinosaurs, amphibians, and fish.

The Santa Rosa fossil site, where LACM 149371 was found, is in the Ucayali Region of Peru. The Santa Rosa fauna also contains fossils of various unique species of marsupials and hystricognath rodents, a possible bat, and some notoungulates (a unique extinct group of South American ungulates). The age of this fauna is unclear, and estimates range from near the Eocene–Oligocene boundary (~35 mya) to the late Oligocene (~25 mya). The Santa Rosa mammals may have lived in a savanna habitat that contained rivers.

More recently, a specimen has been found in the Cerro del Pueblo Formation of Mexico, bearing several similarities to Ferugliotherium. If a ferugliotheriid, this would extend the clade's range into the Maastrichtian of North America.

The range of the Ferugliotheriidae is overall more limited, both in extent and time, than that of Sudamericidae; sudamericids have been recorded from the Late Cretaceous to Miocene of Argentina, the Late Cretaceous of Madagascar and India, the Middle Eocene of Antarctica, and perhaps the Cretaceous of Tanzania (TNM 02067, tentatively referred to Sudamericidae). Nevertheless, ferugliotheriids may be the only gondwanatheres to have had a presence in the Northern Hemisphere.
