= Ferugliotherium =

Ferugliotherium Temporal range: Late Cretaceous (Campanian—Maastrichtian)

Scientific classification
- Kingdom: Animalia
- Phylum: Chordata
- Class: Mammalia
- Family: †Ferugliotheriidae
- Genus: †Ferugliotherium; Bonaparte, 1986
- Species: †F. windhauseni

Binomial name
- †Ferugliotherium windhauseni Bonaparte, 1986

Synonyms
- Vucetichia gracilis Bonaparte, 1990

Genus of extinct mammals from the Late Cretaceous from Argentina

Ferugliotherium is a genus of fossil mammals in the family Ferugliotheriidae from the Campanian and/or Maastrichtian period (Late Cretaceous; around 70 million years ago) of Argentina. It contains a single species, Ferugliotherium windhauseni, which was first described in 1986. Although originally interpreted on the basis of a single brachydont (low-crowned) molar as a member of Multituberculata, an extinct group of small, rodent-like mammals, it was recognized as related to the hypsodont (high-crowned) Sudamericidae following the discovery of additional material in the early 1990s. After a jaw of the sudamericid Sudamerica was described in 1999, these animals (collectively known as Gondwanatheria) were no longer considered to be multituberculates and a few fossils that were previously considered to be Ferugliotherium were assigned to unspecified multituberculates instead. Since 2005, a relationship between gondwanatheres and multituberculates has again received support. A closely related animal, Trapalcotherium, was described in 2009 on the basis of a single tooth.

About twenty teeth and a jaw fragment have been referred to Ferugliotherium, but the assignment of many of these is controversial or has been superseded. The upper and lower incisors are long and rodent-like and have enamel on only one side of the crown. A fragment of the lower jaw shows that the tooth socket of the lower incisor was very long, extending below the fourth premolar (p4). The p4 is preserved in this fragment. It is blade-shaped and resembles multituberculate p4s. However, the determination of this fossil as Ferugliotherium is in question. The identity of a few additional isolated premolars assigned to Ferugliotherium, some resembling multituberculates, is also uncertain. The first lower molariform (molar-like tooth; mf1) is known from four examples, of which two were originally identified as upper molars of a different species (Vucetichia gracilis), which is now considered a synonym of Ferugliotherium. They bear two longitudinal rows of three or four cusps and transverse crests and furrows. A single example each of the second lower (mf2) and first upper molariform (MF1) show that these teeth also had longitudinal cusp rows and transverse furrows and crests, but the mf2 had only two or perhaps three cusps per row and the MF1 had three longitudinal rows.

Although Ferugliotherium teeth are much lower-crowned than those of the Sudamericidae, they share an essentially similar pattern on the occlusal (chewing) surface of mf1 and mf2, similar incisors, backward jaw movement during chewing, and enamel with small prisms. Ferugliotherium is thought to have been a small animal, with a body mass of about 70 g (2.5 oz), and may have eaten insects and plant material. Its remains have been found in two geological formations of southern Argentina, where it is part of a mammal fauna that also includes the sudamericid Gondwanatherium and a variety of dryolestoids.

== Taxonomy ==
Ferugliotherium windhauseni was named in 1986 by Argentinean paleontologist José Bonaparte on the basis of a single second lower molar (m2) from the Late Cretaceous Los Alamitos Formation of Argentina. Both the generic name, Ferugliotherium, and the specific name, windhauseni, honor geologists who studied the geology of Patagonia: Egidio Feruglio and Anselmo Windhausen, respectively. Bonaparte created a new family, Ferugliotheriidae, for the new species and tentatively assigned it to Multituberculata, an extinct group of mammals that was diverse during the late Cretaceous, mostly in the northern continents (Laurasia). In subsequent years, other finds permitted a more confident assignment to Multituberculata. In 1990, Bonaparte described Vucetichia gracilis on the basis of what he interpreted as two upper molars of a relative of Gondwanatherium within the order Gondwanatheria, a small mammalian group that was at the time known only from Argentinean fossils and thought to be related to xenarthrans as part of a now-discarded group called Paratheria. The generic name, Vucetichia, commemorates Argentinean paleontologist Guiomar Vucetich, and the specific name, gracilis (Latin for "slender"), refers to the animal's small size.

However, in 1990 David W. Krause and Bonaparte argued that Gondwanatheria, including Ferugliotherium (family Ferugliotheriidae), Gondwanatherium, and Sudamerica (family Sudamericidae), should be placed within Multituberculata. Two years later, Krause, Bonaparte, and Zofia Kielan-Jaworowska described additional material of Ferugliotherium (which they tentatively placed in the multituberculate suborder Plagiaulacoidea) and suggested that the supposed upper molars of Vucetichia were in fact heavily worn first lower molariforms (mf1) of Ferugliotherium. In 1993, Krause described an unworn mf1 of Ferugliotherium and confirmed that Vucetichia was based on worn specimens of Ferugliotherium and therefore a synonym of the latter. In the same year, he and Bonaparte argued once again that Ferugliotherium, Gondwanatherium, and Sudamerica formed a closely related group of multituberculates, which they called the superfamily Gondwanatherioidea. Kielan-Jaworowska and Bonaparte described a lower jaw fragment with a multituberculate-like lower fourth premolar (p4) from Los Alamitos in 1996 and tentatively identified it as Ferugliotherium. On the basis of the morphological features of the jaw fragment, they argued that gondwanatherians were not closely related to any other multituberculate group, and consequently placed them in a suborder of their own, Gondwanatheria.

In 1999, Rosendo Pascual and colleagues described a jaw of Sudamerica. Because some of this jaw's features were thought to be incompatible with a multituberculate identity, they regarded gondwanatheres (including Ferugliotherium) as Mammalia incertae sedis. However, in 2009 Yamila Gurovich and Robin Beck argued in favor of a close relationship between gondwanatheres (including Ferugliotherium) and multituberculates. The controversy is partially due to disagreement over the assignment of two upper premolars and the jaw fragment described by Kielan-Jaworowska and Bonaparte in 1996; Gurovich and Beck identify these as Ferugliotherium, while Kielan-Jaworowska and others regard them as indeterminate multituberculates.

In the 2000s, some possible close relatives of Ferugliotherium were discovered. An enigmatic tooth from the Paleogene of Peru, LACM 149371, was described in 2004 as possibly related to the family Ferugliotheriidae. Kielan-Jaworowska and colleagues described a p4 from the La Colonia Formation (Late Cretaceous of Argentina) as a new multituberculate genus, Argentodites, in 2007, but Gurovich and Beck noted close similarities between this p4 and the p4 in the possible jaw fragment of Ferugliotherium and suggested that it represented Ferugliotherium or a closely related species. A single mf1 from the Allen Formation (Late Cretaceous of Argentina) was described as another ferugliotheriid genus, Trapalcotherium, in 2009.

== Description ==
Specimens from the Los Alamitos Formation assigned to Ferugliotherium
Specimen	Organ	Currently identified as Ferugliotherium?	Length (mm)	Width (mm)	Height (mm)
MACN Pv-RN 20	Right mf2	Yes (holotype)	1.70	1.70	–
MACN Pv-RN 174	Left mf1	Yes (holotype of Vucetichia gracilis)	2.20	1.60	–
MACN Pv-RN 175	Right mf1	Yes	2.10	1.40	–
MACN Pv-RN 248	Left MF1	Yes	2.50	1.70	–
MACN Pv-RN 249	dP2/dP3?	Possibly	1.50	0.70	–
MACN Pv-RN 250	dP2/dP3?	Possibly	–	–	–
MACN Pv-RN 251	dp1/dp2/dp3?	Possibly	0.85	0.50	–
MACN Pv-RN 252	Lower premolar?	Not even certainly mammalian	–	–	–
MACN Pv-RN 253	Right mf1	Yes	–	1.50	–
MACN Pv-RN 701A	Left i1	Yes	–	1.30	2.40
MACN Pv-RN 701B	Left i1	Yes	–	–	–
MACN Pv-RN 701C	Right i1	Yes	–	–	–
MACN Pv-RN 702A	I2	Yes	–	1.10	1.50
MACN Pv-RN 702B	I2	Yes	–	–	–
MACN Pv-RN 702C	I2	Yes	–	0.90	1.20
MACN Pv-RN 702D	I2	Yes	–	–	–
MACN Pv-RN 970 (or 254)	Right i1	No (referred to Gondwanatherium)	~40 (broken)	3.1	6.3
MACN Pv-RN 975	Dentary fragment with p4	Possibly	4.8 (p4)	0.9 (p4)	–
MLP 88-III-28-1	Left mf1	Yes	2.2	1.5	–

Ferugliotherium is known from isolated teeth, the assignment of some of which is controversial. The material from the Los Alamitos Formation, which is mostly in the Museo Argentino de Ciencias Naturales Bernardino Rivadavia (MACN) in Buenos Aires, with one tooth in the Museo de La Plata (MLP) in La Plata, Argentina, has been thoroughly described; while there are additional Ferugliotherium fossils from the La Colonia Formation, they have not been described in detail. Although the fragmentary nature of the known fossils of Ferugliotherium makes it impossible to determine its dental formula with certainty, Gurovich suggested that it had one incisor (possibly two in the upper jaw), no canines, one or two premolars, and two molars on each side of the lower and upper jaws. However, on the basis of comparisons with Sudamerica, which is known to have had four lower molariforms (molar-like teeth, either premolars or molars) in its lower jaw, Pascual and Ortiz-Jaureguizar suggested in 2007 that Ferugliotherium may also have had four lower molars.

Ferugliotherium was much smaller than the sudamericids Gondwanatherium and Sudamerica, and its body mass is estimated to have been about 70 g (2.5 oz). Unlike the hypsodont (high-crowned) sudamericids, Ferugliotherium has brachydont (low-crowned) molariform teeth that are supported by at least two roots, not a single massive root. The direction of wear on the teeth indicates that Ferugliotherium, Gondwanatherium, and Sudamerica all had palinal jaw movement (i.e., the lower jaw moved backwards during the power stroke of chewing)—a feature otherwise only seen in multituberculates among mammals.

=== Incisors ===
Three fragmentary Ferugliotherium lower incisors (MACN Pv-RN 701A, 701B, and 701C) are known from the Los Alamitos Formation. Another incisor, MACN Pv-RN 970, was assigned to Ferugliotherium by Bonaparte in 1990, but it is much larger than the other three incisors, which are otherwise similar, and probably represents Gondwanatherium instead. Only the tips of the three incisors are preserved. They are laterally compressed, with an estimated width of 1.3 mm and height of 2.4 mm in 701A. The medial side (towards the middle of the mouth) is flat, but the lateral side (towards the sides) is convex. There is enamel only on the lower (ventral) side. A large wear facet is present at the tip, forming an angle of about 35° with the ventral margin in 701A. The three incisor fragments are identified as Ferugliotherium because of their size and provenance and the presence of a restricted enamel band. They show features, such as lateral compression, an acute angle at the tip, small curvature, and an irregular cross section, that are usually seen in lower, not upper incisors in mammals with procumbent incisors, such as rodents and taeniolabidoid multituberculates.

Four specimens (MACN Pv-RN 702A through 702D) are thought to represent second upper incisors (I2) of Ferugliotherium. 702A (height 1.5 mm; width 1.1 mm) and 702B are slightly larger than 702C (height 1.2 mm; width 0.9 mm) and 702D. The smaller incisors cannot be lateral incisors (I3), because 702C's wear facet is stronger than would be expected in an I3; therefore, all four upper incisors are identified as central incisors (I2). To explain the size difference, Krause and colleagues suggested that Ferugliotherium was variable in size or that the smaller incisors were deciduous precursors of the larger permanent tooth. They considered it less likely that multiple species with similar incisors were present. The upper incisors have enamel only on the dorsal side. The wear facet at the tip is preserved only in 702C, forming an angle of 52° with the dorsal side, and is more concave than the facet in the lower incisors. 702A–D are recognizable as upper incisors because they have a less acute angle at the tip and are less laterally compressed, more curved, and elliptical in cross section.

Incisors of Ferugliotherium and Gondwanatherium are similar in overall shape and share a restricted band of enamel—a feature otherwise seen only in multituberculates among Mesozoic mammals. The incisors of Sudamerica are also similar.

=== Mandible with lower premolar ===
MACN Pv-RN 975, a fragment of the mandible (lower jaw) preserving one premolar, was discovered in 1991 and tentatively identified as Ferugliotherium by Kielan-Jaworowska and Bonaparte in 1996, but this assignment remains controversial. The poorly preserved and worn premolar is a bladelike tooth, resembling multituberculate fourth lower premolars (p4). The premolar is 4.8 mm long and bears eight faint ridges on both the labial (towards the lips) and lingual (towards the tongue) sides. On the labial side, the four ridges at the back are more widely separated than the four in front of them. The back and front margins of the tooth are parallel and there is no small cusp on the labial side. There are two roots; the one at the front is larger than the one at the back and bears a furrow. The lower border of the enamel cover is marked by two semicircular extensions of the enamel on the front side, but there is only one such extension at the back. By its size, the number of ridges, and apparently greater length than height, it differs from all known multituberculate first, second, and third lower premolars, indicating that it is a p4.

The dentary (lower jaw bone) itself is robust and short. The length axis of the p4 makes an angle of about 58° with the length axis of the jawbone. The bone is concave on the lingual, but convex on the labial side. There is a diastema (gap) between the p4 and the incisor that would have been in front of it, as in the jaw of Sudamerica. Gurovich estimated the length of the diastema as 2.5 mm. There is a rounded mental foramen (an opening in the labial side of the jawbone), with a diameter of 0.7 mm, located about 0.8 mm below the dorsal margin of the bone and 1.5 mm in front of the p4. Although the incisor itself is not preserved, its alveolus (the housing of the root) is in part. As in Sudamerica, it extends far into the dentary, passing below p4. The alveolus is 1.5 mm wide below the front root of p4 and 1.4 mm at the back of the jaw fragment. Although the height of the alveolus cannot be determined because the lower side is broken away, the incisor must have been quite deep.

When it was discovered that Sudamerica had four molariform teeth and no bladelike premolar in its lower jaw, Pascual, Kielan-Jaworowska, and colleagues removed MACN Pv-RN 975 from Ferugliotherium, which they expected to have the same dental formula as its fellow gondwanathere Sudamerica, and identified it as an indeterminate multituberculate instead. Pascual and colleagues argued that molariform teeth as seen in Sudamerica could not have evolved from the bladelike p4 of Ferugliotherium, and that it was unlikely that additional molars had been added in Sudamerica. In 2004 and 2007, Kielan-Jaworowska and colleagues aligned the dentary with the multituberculate suborder "Plagiaulacida" because the p4 is rectangular in labial view, not curved as in the suborder Cimolodonta. This feature was also used to distinguish MACN Pv-RN 975 from the single p4 assigned to Argentodites, which was tentatively placed in Cimolodonta.

Gurovich, Guillermo Rougier, and colleagues, on the other hand, maintain that the dentary is referable to Ferugliotherium and that the p4s of Argentodites and MACN Pv-RN 975 are very similar. The alveolus of MACN Pv-RN 975 fits the lower incisors attributed to Ferugliotherium in size and the blade-like premolar is of the size expected for an animal with molariforms the size of Ferugliotherium teeth. If the dentary and premolars (whose identification has been similarly controversial; see below) do not belong to Ferugliotherium, then, Gurovich and Beck argue, the Los Alamitos Formation would contain two mammals (Ferugliotherium and a multituberculate) similar in size and morphology, and therefore presumably occupying similar ecological niches—and one of those would be represented only by molariforms and incisors and the other only by premolars and a jaw fragment among the available fossils. Furthermore, they noted that the transition from blade-like to molariform premolars had actually been observed in the fossil record of the extinct sthenurine kangaroos, and that the first molariform in Sudamerica and Gondwanatherium is laterally compressed, suggesting that it may have derived from a blade-like tooth. Gurovich and Beck attributed the difference in shape between the MACN Pv-RN 975 and Argentodites p4s to the extensive wear of the former, and suggested that the two are similar enough that they probably represent at least closely related species.

=== Other premolars ===
Krause and colleagues identified a single tooth, MACN Pv-RN 251, as a possible deciduous anterior (i.e., not p4 or dp4, the deciduous version of p4) lower premolar of Ferugliotherium. It is minuscule, with a length of 0.85 mm and width of 0.5 mm (assuming the tooth is oriented correctly). It bears two serrations (small projections) at the tip of the crown—one around the middle of the crown and the other at what may be the back of the crown, where it is highest. Two prominent ridges descend from each serration towards the front down the sides of the tooth. No roots are preserved, but the rounded surface of the lower side of the tooth suggests they may have been resorbed, which would indicate that the tooth is deciduous. Krause and colleagues suggested that the tooth may have been the frontmost premolar, whether deciduous or permanent. However, Kielan-Jaworowska and Bonaparte wrote that this tooth does not match the partial jaw MACN Pv-RN 975, which has no alveoli in front of p4, and Pascual and colleagues agreed in 1999 that the tooth probably does not belong to Ferugliotherium.

Bonaparte had identified another tooth, MACN Pv-RN 252, as a possible Ferugliotherium lower premolar in 1990, but this fossil is very fragmentary and according to Krause and colleagues, it cannot even be proven to be a mammalian tooth.

Krause and colleagues identified two teeth, MACN Pv-RN 249 and 250, as anterior upper premolars. 249 bears two longitudinal rows of cusps. One row (row A; possibly the lingual one) includes four cusps, the other (row B) includes at least two, but is damaged. In row A, there are three ridges (at the front, middle, and back) extending from the tip of the base of each cusp. The second and third cusps are largest and most widely separated from each other. In row B, one cusp bears three ridges, of which one extends towards the other cusp in the row and the two others towards row A) and the other cusp is damaged. 250 is more fragmentary, but bears at least five cusps and may represent the same tooth position as 249, though it would come from the opposite side of the mouth. The microstructure of the enamel of this tooth has been studied. With a width of about 55 μm near the tip of a cusp, the enamel is thin. The enamel prisms are straight, small, and rounded and there is little material between the prisms. Small, rounded prisms are also seen in Gondwanatherium, Sudamerica, and other gondwanatheres, but in few multituberculates. Even in those multituberculates that do have small prisms, the prism sheath is closed, but the sheath is incomplete in Gondwanatherium and possibly Ferugliotherium.

Krause and colleagues wrote that these two teeth resemble multituberculate deciduous anterior upper premolars, particularly second and third premolars (P2 and P3), and used this as one of their arguments for identifying Ferugliotherium as a multituberculate. However, as with the dentary MACN Pv-RN 975, the two upper premolars were excluded from Ferugliotherium and identified as multituberculates by Kielan-Jaworowska and colleagues after the discovery of the jaw of Sudamerica. Gurovich continues to identify them as Ferugliotherium on the basis of their size and provenance and other similarities between Ferugliotherium and multituberculates.

=== Lower molariforms ===
Five putative lower molariforms of Ferugliotherium are known from the Los Alamitos Formation (MACN Pv-RN 20, 174, 175, and 253 and MLP 88-III-28-1). These teeth include the holotypes of Ferugliotherium windhauseni (MACN Pv-RN 20, the only second lower molariform, or m2) and Vucetichia gracilis (MACN Pv-RN 174).

The best-preserved mf1 is MLP 88-III-28-1. The crown is unworn and complete and there are no roots, suggesting that the tooth had not yet erupted when its owner died. Krause, who first described the tooth in 1993, identified it as a right molar, but the subsequent discovery of the jaw of Sudamerica made it clear that Ferugliotherium molariforms had been reversed, and MLP 88-III-28-1 is actually from the left side of the jaw. The tooth is 2.2 mm long and 1.5 mm wide. The crown is roughly rectangular, with rounded corners, and bears two longitudinal rows of cusps. The lingual row consists of four cusps, which are smaller and lower than the three labial ones. The cusps in this row become smaller and lower from the front to the back. Two ridges descend from the tip of each cusp to the lingual and labial sides. The labial ridges on the first and fourth cusp only reach the base of the cusp, but those on the second and third cusps join ridges descending from the first and second labial cusp. In the first three cusps, the lingual ridge extends to near the lingual margin of the tooth and then turns backward; the end of the ridge is lingual to the next cusp. In the fourth cusp, the ridge hardly extends posteriorly, but rather labially, forming the posterior margin of the tooth and joining a ridge descending from the last labial cusp. The labial cusp row includes three, larger cusps, each of which bears two ridges that descend lingually into the valley between the two cusp rows. The front ridge of each pair ends in the central valley, and the back ridge joins a ridge from a lingual cusp. The ridge pattern results in the presence of three transverse furrows between the main cusps.

Another mf1, MACN Pv-RN 253, is almost unworn, but damaged: only the front two lingual cusps and the first two cusps and part of the third in the labial row are preserved. This tooth is similar to MLP 88-III-28-1 in all respects. However, Gurovich suggests that it may also be an m2. MACN Pv-RN 174, which is heavily worn, and MACN Pv-RN 175, which is not only heavily worn but has also undergone severe abrasion, were originally identified as upper molars of Vucetichia gracilis by Bonaparte in 1990. The roots of MACN Pv-RN 174 are preserved; at the front and back of the tooth, there is a pair of roots, which are fused near their bases. It has small enamel prisms. Krause and colleagues suggested in 1992 that 174 and 175 were mf1s of Ferugliotherium on the basis of similarities with 253, and Krause confirmed this in 1993 by describing the complete mf1 MLP 88-III-28-1. The related ferugliotheriid genus Trapalcotherium is known from a single mf1, which is similar to Ferugliotherium mf1s but different in some morphological details (see Trapalcotherium: Relationships).

The holotype, MACN Pv-RN 20, is a right mf2 according to both Krause and colleagues (1992) and Gurovich (2005), but Gurovich considered the side that Krause and colleagues thought was lingual to be labial, and vice versa. The latter interpretation is used in the following description. It is almost square, but at the front it is slightly narrower than at the back. The labial side of the tooth is taller and less worn than the lingual side. There are two rows of cusps, and each lingual cusp is connected to each labial cusp by a broad crest, with one or more fossas in the middle. One of the two labial cusps may have been divided into two smaller cusps. The two crests are separated by a deep furrow. The enamel prisms of this tooth are small, like those of the premolar MACN Pv-RN 250.

Transverse ridges between the cusps, as seen in Ferugliotherium, are known in only one multituberculate, Essonodon, but the ridge pattern in Essonodon is more complicated and the animal lacks the prominent furrows of Ferugliotherium and differs in numerous other features. On the other hand, overall patterns of cusps and ridges are essentially similar among Ferugliotherium, Gondwanatherium, and Sudamerica, indicating that the three are closely related.

=== Upper molariforms ===
A single tooth, MACN Pv-RN 248, is currently identified as a Ferugliotherium upper molariform. In 1992, Krause and colleagues labeled it as a right MF1, but Gurovich identifies it as a left MF1 or possibly even a right mf1. LACM 149371, an enigmatic tooth from the Paleogene of Santa Rosa, Peru, may represent an upper molar of an animal related to Ferugliotherium. Like the latter, it has cusps that are compressed from front to back and that are connected to the center of the crown by low crests.

MACN Pv-RN 248 is somewhat damaged and almost rectangular, but slightly narrower at the back than at the front. The tooth bears three longitudinal rows of cusps. The middle row consists of five cusps, the labial row (assuming it is a left M1; if it is from the right, "lingual" and "labial" should be reversed) includes two or perhaps three cusps, and the lingual row includes probably four cusps. The lingual and middle rows extend across the entire length of the tooth, but the labial row is shorter, extending across about 70% of the length. The middle row is oriented obliquely with respect to the length axis of the tooth, so that it converges with the lingual row towards the back of the tooth. The front lingual corner of the tooth is missing, but it appears that the first cusps in the lingual and middle rows are connected by two ridges, one at the front margin of the tooth and one at the back of the cusps. A deep fossa (basin) lies between the two cusps and their connecting ridges. Behind these two cusps, a transverse furrow extends across the width of the tooth. The second lingual and middle cusps are also connected by a crest, which is somewhat weaker than those connecting the first cusps. Another transverse furrow extends behind the second cusps and also separates the second middle cusp from the labial row. A third furrow, behind the third lingual and middle cusps, also separates the first from the second labial cusp. Three ridges descend from the fourth lingual cusp: one connects to the fourth middle cusp, one ends blindly between the fourth lingual and middle cusps, and one connects to the fifth middle cusp. The second labial cusp, which is larger than the first one, is superficially divided into two smaller cusps by an indentation on its lingual side. There are vertical grooves at the bases of the cusps.

== Range and ecology ==
Remains of Ferugliotherium come from two formations in the Late Cretaceous of southern Argentina, the Los Alamitos and La Colonia Formations. These and the Allen Formation (which has yielded Trapalcotherium) are all dated to the Campanian (84–71 million years ago) and/or Maastrichtian (71–66 million years ago), the penultimate and ultimate stages of the Cretaceous. The La Colonia Formation may be somewhat younger than the other two, while the Los Alamitos Formation has been considered Campanian, and can be dated to the Campanian or Maastrichtian on the basis of palynology. The Allen Formation is likely Maastrichtian, but not latest Maastrichtian.

The Los Alamitos Formation is located in southeastern Río Negro Province, in the vicinity of the town of Cona Niyeu and was probably deposited in a marshy environment. In 1983, it yielded the first Mesozoic mammal to be found in Argentina, Mesungulatum houssayi, and since then, the mammalian fauna has expanded to 14 species. Most of those belong to the archaic mammalian group Dryolestoidea, but the fauna also includes the gondwanatheres Ferugliotherium and Gondwanatherium. The dryolestoids Mesungulatum houssayi and Groebertherium novasi and the two gondwanatheres are the most common mammals. Other fossils found in the Los Alamitos Formation include fish, frogs, turtles, madtsoiid snakes, dinosaurs such as Secernosaurus, gastropods, and other invertebrates.

The La Colonia Formation outcrops in north-central Chubut Province, and the mammalian fossils come from the Mirasol Chico valley. The formation includes fluvial (river), deep-sea, and near-shore deposits, and the mammalian fauna probably comes from an estuary, tidal flat, or coastal plain. The La Colonia Formation also contains dryolestoids, such as Coloniatherium and Reigitherium, as well as a ferugliotheriid and the putative multituberculate Argentodites. In addition, the La Colonia Formation has yielded fossils of a wide array of other animals, including crocodiles, plesiosaurs, lungfish (Ceratodus), and dinosaurs (including Carnotaurus).

The high-crowned sudamericids were probably herbivores, but the lower-crowned Ferugliotherium was more probably an insectivore or omnivore, like similar multituberculates such as Mesodma, which is thought to have eaten insects, other arthropods, seeds, and/or nuts. It may have used its incisors for gnawing or slicing, and the blade-like p4 may also have been used for slicing hard plant parts, such as seeds. The wear patterns on Ferugliotherium teeth independently suggest that the animal may have eaten some plant material.
