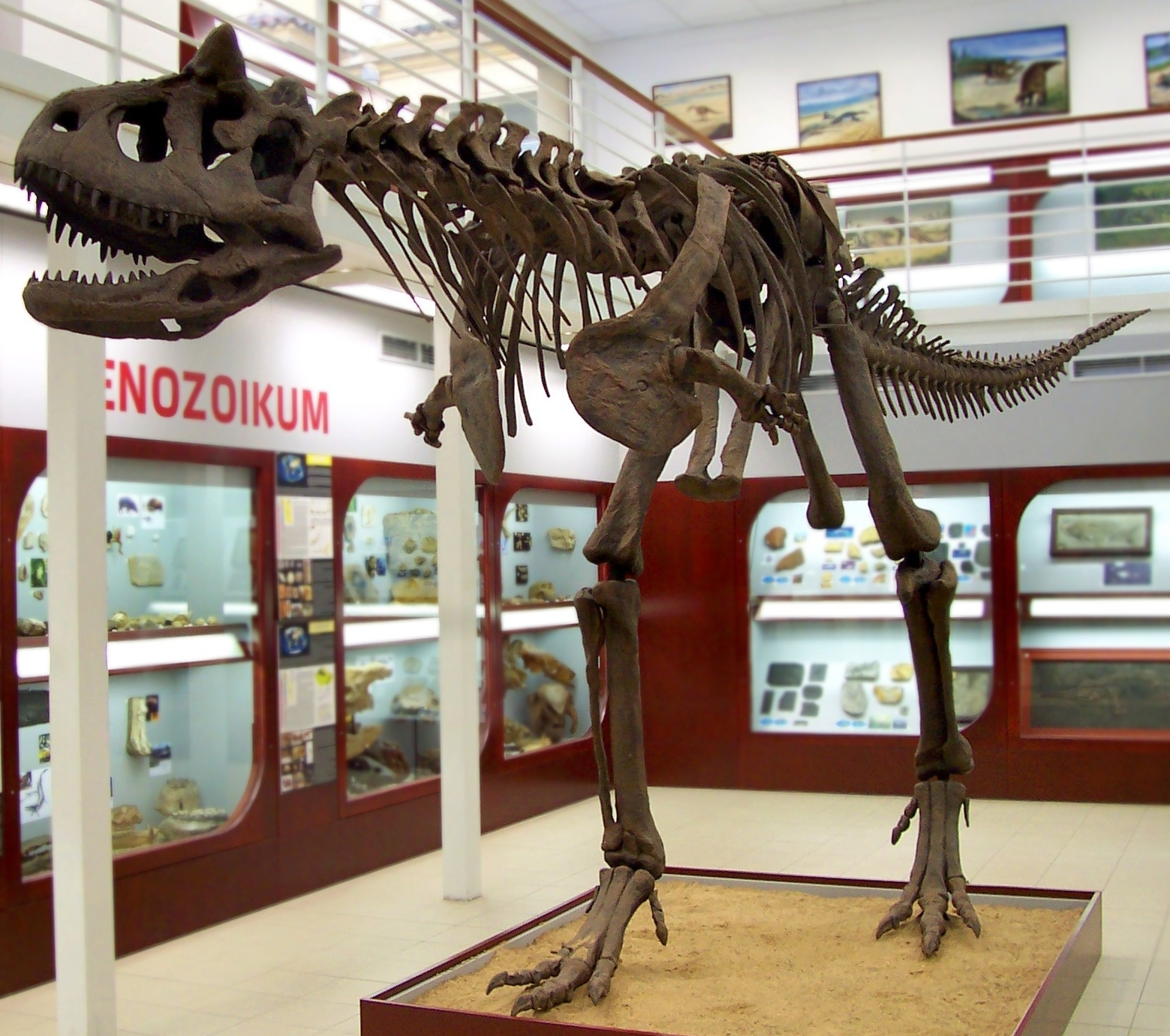
- Mounted skeletal cast

Scientific classification
- Kingdom: Animalia
- Phylum: Chordata
- Class: Reptilia
- Clade: Dinosauria
- Clade: Saurischia
- Clade: Theropoda
- Family: †Abelisauridae
- Clade: †Furileusauria
- Tribe: †Carnotaurini
- Genus: †Carnotaurus; Bonaparte, 1985
- Species: †C. sastrei

Binomial name
- †Carnotaurus sastrei Bonaparte, 1985

= Carnotaurus =

Carnotaurus Temporal range: Late Cretaceous (Maastrichtian), 69–66 Ma

Genus of dinosaur from the Late Cretaceous period

Carnotaurus /ˌkɑːrnoʊˈtɔːrəs/ is a genus of theropod dinosaur that lived in South America during the Late Cretaceous period, between 69 and 66 million years ago. The only species is Carnotaurus sastrei. Known from a single well-preserved skeleton, it is one of the best-understood theropods from the Southern Hemisphere. The skeleton, found in 1984, was uncovered in the Chubut Province of Argentina from rocks of the La Colonia Formation. Carnotaurus is a derived member of the Abelisauridae, a group of large theropods that occupied the large predatorial niche in the southern landmasses of Gondwana during the late Cretaceous. Within the Abelisauridae, the genus is often considered a member of the Brachyrostra, a clade of short-snouted forms restricted to South America.

Carnotaurus was a lightly built, bipedal predator, measuring 7.5 to 8 m (24.6 to 26.2 ft) in length and weighing 1.3–2.1 metric tons (1.4–2.3 short tons; 1.3–2.1 long tons). As a theropod, Carnotaurus was highly specialized and distinctive. It had two thick horns above the eyes, a unique feature unseen in all other carnivorous dinosaurs, and a very deep skull sitting on a muscular neck. Carnotaurus was further characterized by small, vestigial forelimbs and long, slender hind limbs. The skeleton is preserved with extensive skin impressions, showing a mosaic of small, non-overlapping scales approximately 5 mm in diameter. The mosaic was interrupted by large bumps that lined the sides of the animal, and there are no hints of feathers.

The distinctive horns and the muscular neck may have been used in fighting others of its species. According to separate studies, rivaling individuals may have combated each other with quick head blows, by slow pushes with the upper sides of their skulls, or by ramming each other head-on, using their horns as shock absorbers. The feeding habits of Carnotaurus remain unclear: some studies suggested the animal was able to hunt down very large prey such as sauropods, while other studies found it preyed mainly on relatively small animals.

== Discovery ==
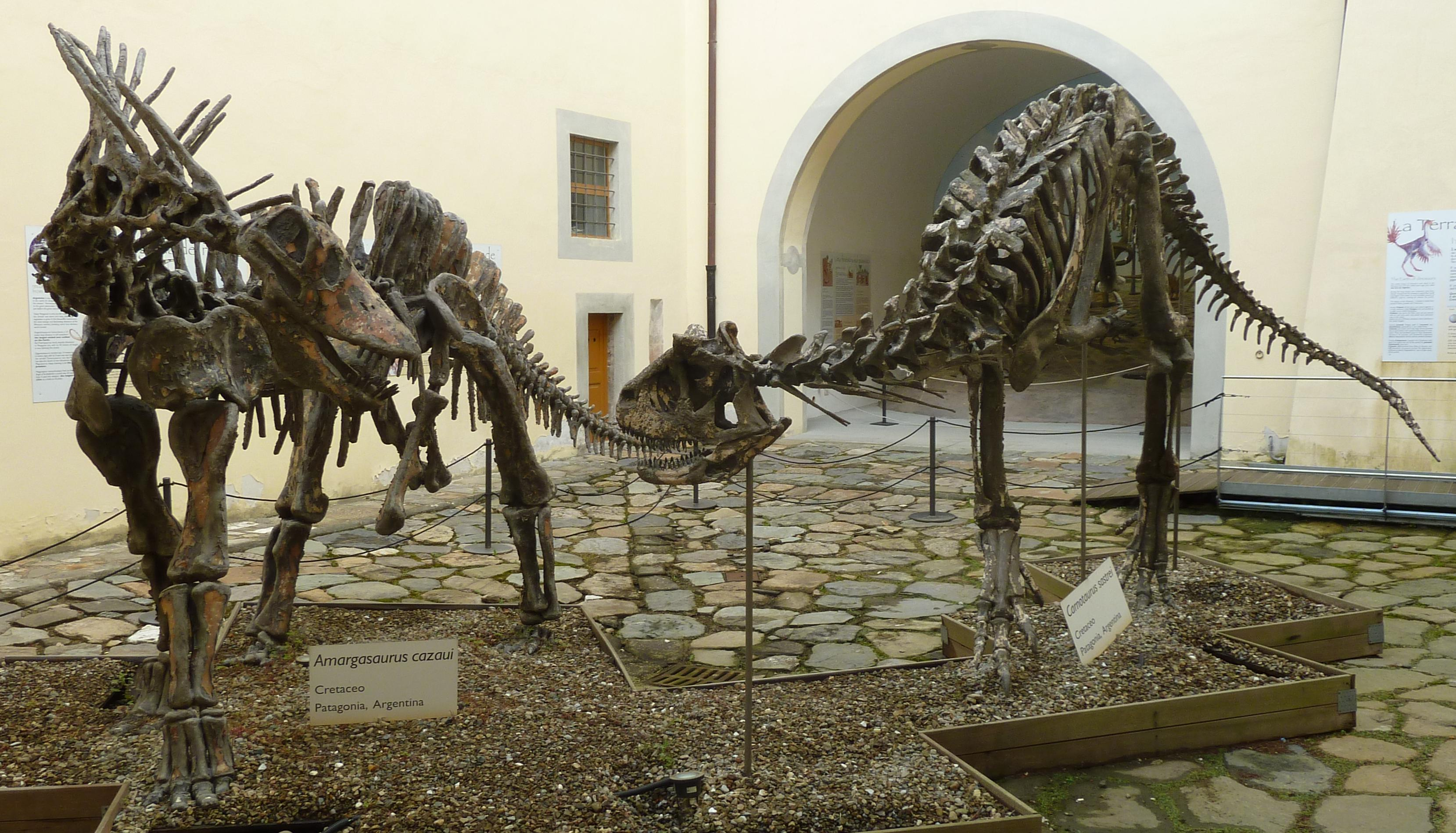
Casts of Amargasaurus and Carnotaurus, both discovered by the same 1984 expedition in Argentina, Natural History Museum of the University of Pisa

The only skeleton (holotype MACN-CH 894) was unearthed in 1984 by an expedition led by Argentinian paleontologist José Bonaparte. (Note: p. 276 in Novas (2009)) This expedition also recovered the peculiar spiny sauropod Amargasaurus. It was the eighth expedition within the project named "Jurassic and Cretaceous Terrestrial Vertebrates of South America", which started in 1976 and was sponsored by the National Geographic Society. (Note: p. 2 in Bonaparte (1990)) The skeleton is well-preserved and articulated (still connected together), with only the posterior two thirds of the tail, much of the lower leg, and the hind feet being destroyed by weathering. (Note: p. 2 in Bonaparte (1992)) The skeleton belonged to an adult individual, as indicated by the fused sutures in the braincase. It was found lying on its right side, showing a typical death pose with the neck bent back over the torso. Unusually, it is preserved with extensive skin impressions. (Note: p. 2 in Bonaparte (1990)) In view of the significance of these impressions, a second expedition was started to reinvestigate the original excavation site, leading to the recovery of several additional skin patches. The skull was deformed during fossilization, with the snout bones of the left side displaced forwards relative to the right side, the nasal bones pushed upwards, and the premaxillae pushed backwards onto the nasal bones. Deformation also exaggerated the upward curvature of the upper jaw. (Note: p. 191 in Carrano and Sampson (2008)) The snout was more strongly affected by deformation than the rear part of the skull, possibly due to the higher rigidity of the latter. In top or bottom view, the upper jaws were less U-shaped than the lower jaws, resulting in an apparent mismatch. This mismatch is the result of deformation acting from the sides, which affected the upper jaws but not the lower jaws, possibly due to the greater flexibility of the joints within the latter.

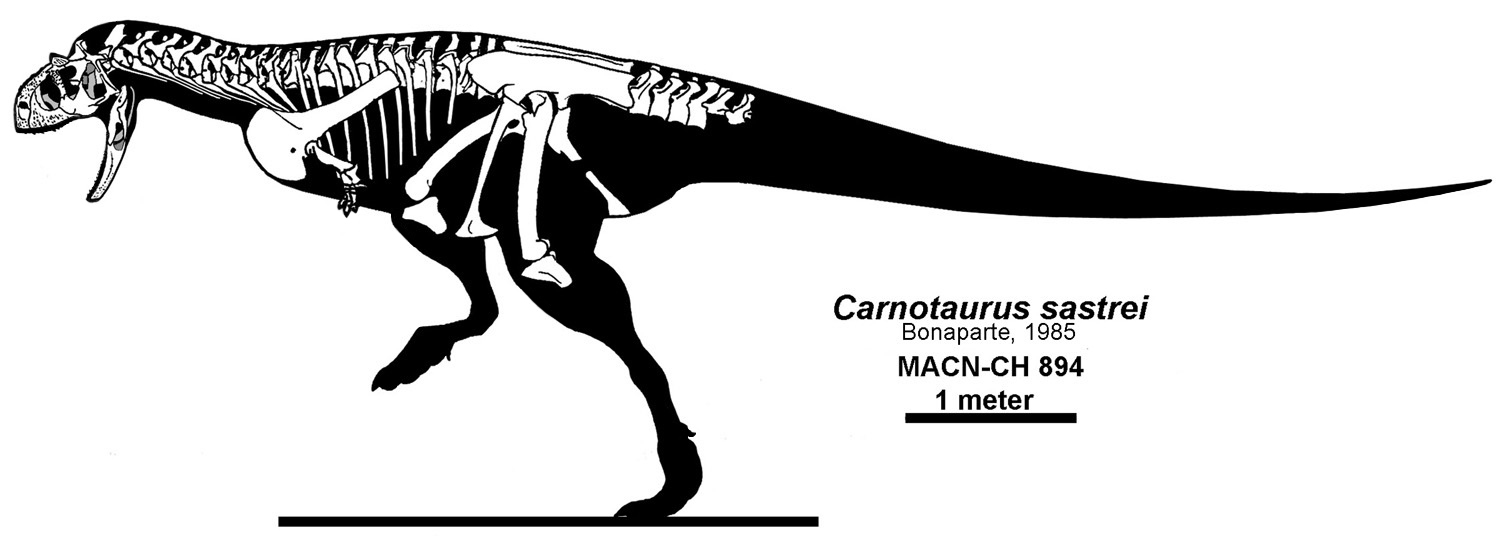
Illustration of the known material of Carnotaurus

The skeleton was collected on a farm named "Pocho Sastre" near Bajada Moreno in the Telsen Department of Chubut Province, Argentina. Because it was embedded in a large hematite concretion, a very hard kind of rock, preparation was complicated and progressed slowly. In 1985, Bonaparte published a note presenting Carnotaurus sastrei as a new genus and species and briefly describing the skull and lower jaw. The generic name Carnotaurus is derived from the Latin carno [carnis] ("flesh") and taurus ("bull") and can be translated with "meat-eating bull", an allusion to the animal's bull-like horns. The specific name sastrei honors Angel Sastre, the owner of the ranch where the skeleton was found. A comprehensive description of the whole skeleton followed in 1990. After Abelisaurus, Carnotaurus was the second member of the family Abelisauridae that was discovered. For years, it was by far the best-understood member of its family, and also the best-understood theropod from the Southern Hemisphere. It was not until the 21st century that similar well-preserved abelisaurids were described, including Aucasaurus, Majungasaurus and Skorpiovenator, allowing scientists to re-evaluate certain aspects of the anatomy of Carnotaurus. (Note: p. 191 in Carrano and Sampson (2008)) The holotype skeleton is displayed in the Argentine Museum of Natural Sciences, Bernardino Rivadavia; (Note: p. 3 in Bonaparte (1990)) replicas can be seen in this and other museums around the world. Sculptors Stephen and Sylvia Czerkas manufactured a life-sized sculpture of Carnotaurus that was previously on display at the Natural History Museum of Los Angeles County. This sculpture, ordered by the museum during the mid-1980s, is probably the first life restoration of a theropod showing accurate skin.

== Description ==
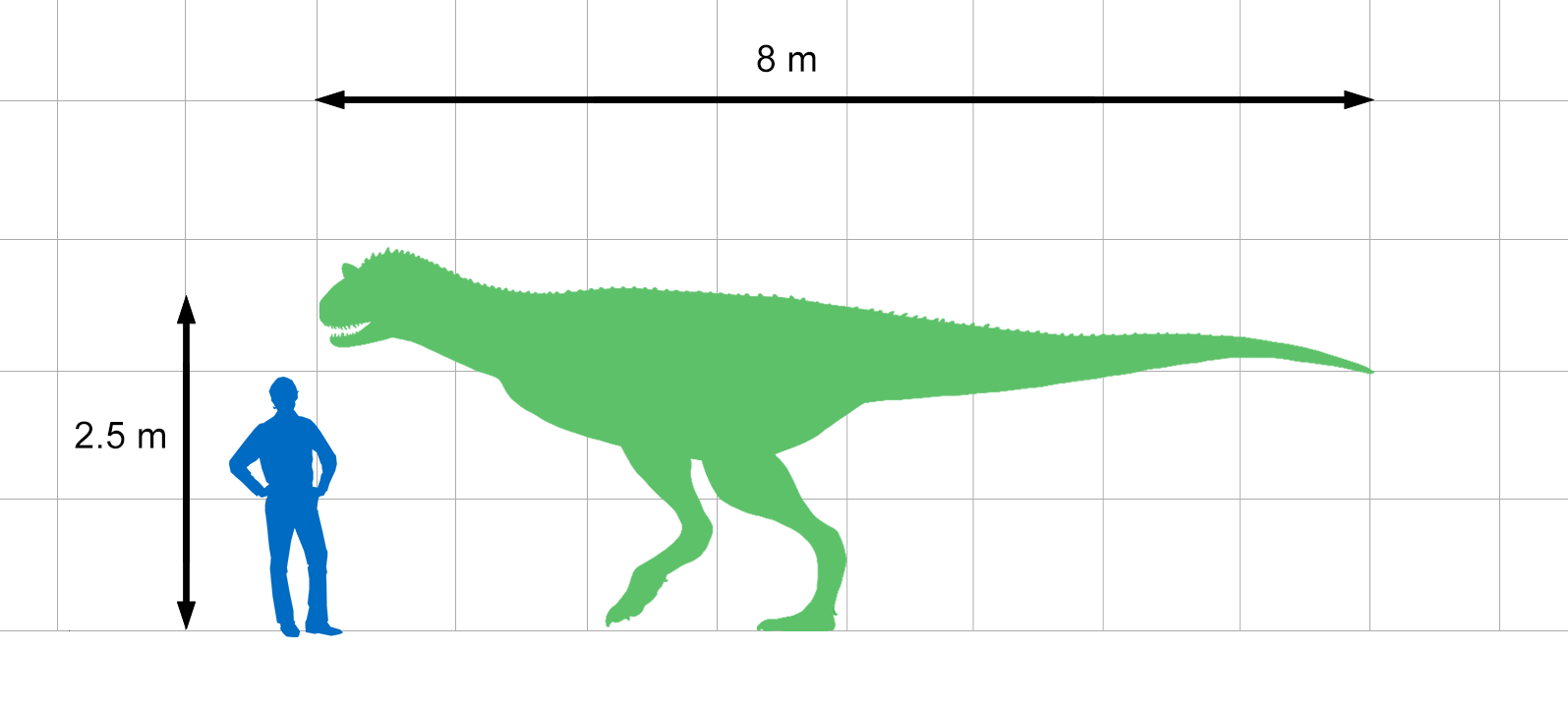
Scale diagram comparing Carnotaurus to a human

Carnotaurus was a large but lightly built predator. The only known individual was about 7.5–8 m (24.6–26.2 ft) in length, (Note: p. 38 in Bonaparte (1990)) (Note: p. 162 in Juárez Valieri et al. (2010)) making Carnotaurus one of the largest abelisaurids. (Note: p. 191 in Carrano and Sampson (2008)) (Note: p. 162 in Juárez Valieri et al. (2010)) Ekrixinatosaurus and possibly Abelisaurus, which are highly incomplete, might have been similar or larger in size. (Note: p. 163 in Juárez Valieri et al. (2010)) (Note: p. 556 in Calvo et al. (2004)) (Note: p. 191 in Carrano and Sampson (2008)) A 2016 study found that only Pycnonemosaurus, at 8.9 m (29.2 ft), was longer than Carnotaurus; it was estimated at 7.8 m (25.6 ft). Its mass is estimated to have been 1,350 kg (1.33 long tons; 1.49 short tons), (Note: p. 30 in Bonaparte (1990)) 1,500 kg (1.5 long tons; 1.7 short tons), (Note: p. 187 in Mazzetta et al. (1998)) 2,000 kg (2.0 long tons; 2.2 short tons), 2,100 kg (2.1 long tons; 2.3 short tons), (Note: p. 79 in Mazzetta et al. (2004)) and 1,306–1,743 kg (1.285–1.715 long tons; 1.440–1.921 short tons) in separate studies that used different estimation methods. Carnotaurus was a highly specialized theropod, as seen especially in characteristics of the skull, the vertebrae and the forelimbs. (Note: p. 276 in Novas (2009)) The pelvis and hind limbs, on the other hand, remained relatively conservative, resembling those of the more basal Ceratosaurus. Both the pelvis and hind limb were long and slender. The left femur (thigh bone) of the individual measures 103 cm in length, but shows an average diameter of only 11 cm. (Note: p. 28–32 in Bonaparte (1990))

=== Skull ===
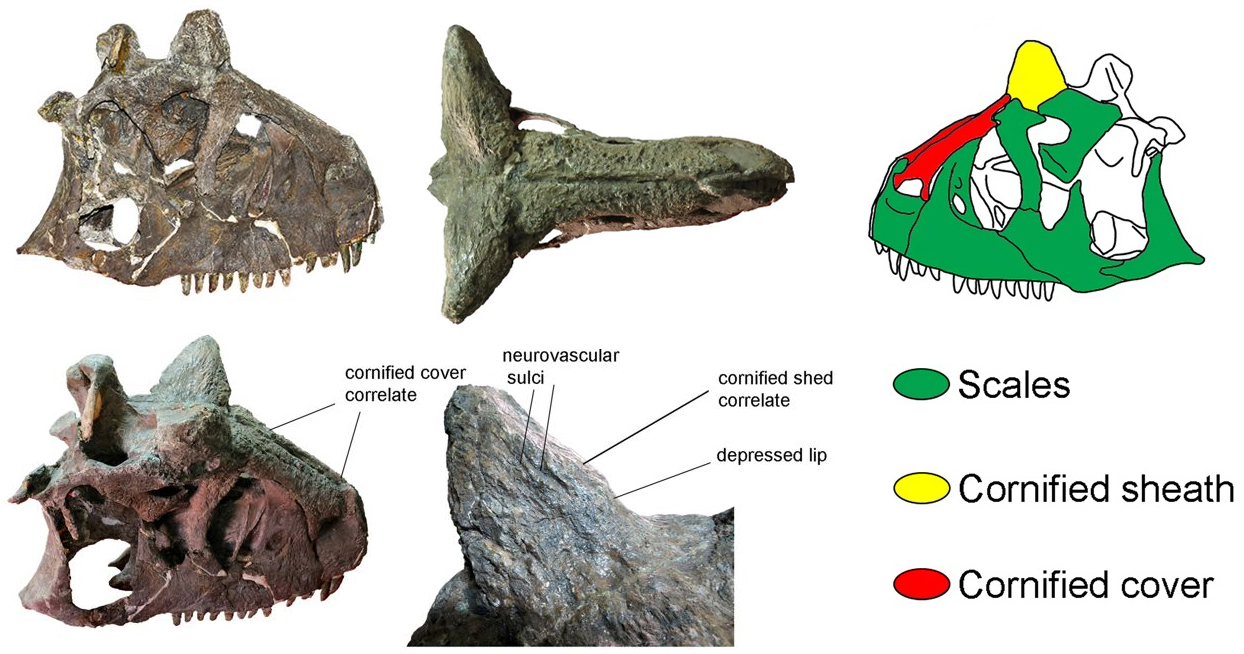
Skull in multiple views, with details of the skin structures inferred, and the right frontal horn

The skull, measuring 59.6 cm (23.5 in) in length, was proportionally shorter and deeper than in any other large carnivorous dinosaur. (Note: p. 8 in Bonaparte (1990)) (Note: p. 191 in Carrano and Sampson (2008)) The snout was moderately broad, not as tapering as seen in more basal theropods like Ceratosaurus, and the jaws were curved upwards. A prominent pair of horns protruded obliquely above the eyes. These horns, formed by the frontal bones, (Note: p. 4–5 in Bonaparte (1990)) were thick and cone-shaped, internally solid, somewhat vertically flattened in cross-section, and measured 15 cm (5.9 in) in length. Bonaparte, in 1990, suggested that these horns would probably have formed the bony cores of much longer keratinous sheaths. (Note: p. 5 in Bonaparte (1990)) Mauricio Cerroni and colleagues, in 2020, agreed that the horns supported keratinous sheaths, but argued that these sheaths would not have been greatly longer than the bony cores.

As in other dinosaurs, the skull was perforated by six major skull openings on each side. The frontmost of these openings, the external naris (bony nostril), was subrectangular and directed sidewards and forwards, but was not sloping in side view as in some other ceratosaurs such as Ceratosaurus. This opening was formed by the nasal and premaxilla only, while in some related ceratosaurs the maxilla also contributed to this opening. Between the bony nostril and the orbit (eye opening) was the antorbital fenestra. In Carnotaurus, this opening was higher than long, while it was longer than high in related forms such as Skorpiovenator and Majungasaurus. The antorbital fenestra was bounded by a larger depression, the antorbital fossa, which was formed by recessed parts of the maxilla in front and the lacrimal behind. As in all abelisaurids, this depression was small in Carnotaurus. The lower front corner of the antorbital fossa contained a smaller opening, the promaxillary fenestra, which led into an air-filled cavity within the maxilla. The eye was situated in the upper part of the keyhole-shaped orbit. (Note: p. 3 in Bonaparte (1990)) This upper part was proportionally small and subcircular, and separated from the lower part of the orbit by the forward-projecting postorbital bone. It was slightly tilted forward, probably permitting some degree of binocular vision. (Note: p. 191 in Mazzetta et al. (1998)) The keyhole-like shape of the orbit was possibly related to the marked skull shortening, and is also found in related short-snouted abelisaurids. As in all abelisaurids, the frontal bone (on the skull roof between the eyes) was excluded from the orbit. Behind the orbit were two openings, the infratemporal fenestra on the side and the supratemporal fenestra on the top of the skull. The infratemporal fenestra was tall, short, and kidney-shaped, while the supratemporal fenestra was short and square-shaped. Another opening, the mandibular fenestra, was located in the lower jaw – in Carnotaurus, this opening was comparatively large.

Schematic diagram of reconstructed skull

On each side of the upper jaws there were four premaxillary and twelve maxillary teeth, (Note: p. 255 in Novas (2009)) while the lower jaws were equipped with fifteen dentary teeth per side. (Note: p. 6 in Bonaparte (1990)) The teeth had been described as being long and slender, as opposed to the very short teeth seen in other abelisaurids. However, Cerroni and colleagues, in their 2020 description of the skull, stated that all erupted teeth have been severely damaged during excavation and were later reconstructed with plaster (Bonaparte, in 1990, only noted that some lower jaw teeth had been fragmented). (Note: p. 6 in Bonaparte (1990)) Reliable information on the shape of the teeth is therefore limited to replacement teeth and tooth roots that are still enclosed by the jaw, and can be studied using CT imaging. The replacement teeth had low, flattened crowns, were closely spaced, and inclined forwards at approximately 45°. In his 1990 description, Bonaparte noted that the lower jaw was shallow and weakly constructed, with the dentary (the foremost jaw bone) connected to the hindmost jaw bones by only two contact points; this contrasts to the robust-looking skull. (Note: p. 6 in Bonaparte (1990)) Cerroni and colleagues instead found multiple but loose connections between the dentary and the hindmost jaw bones. This articulation, therefore, was very flexible but not necessarily weak. The bottom margin of the dentary was convex, while it was straight in Majungasaurus.

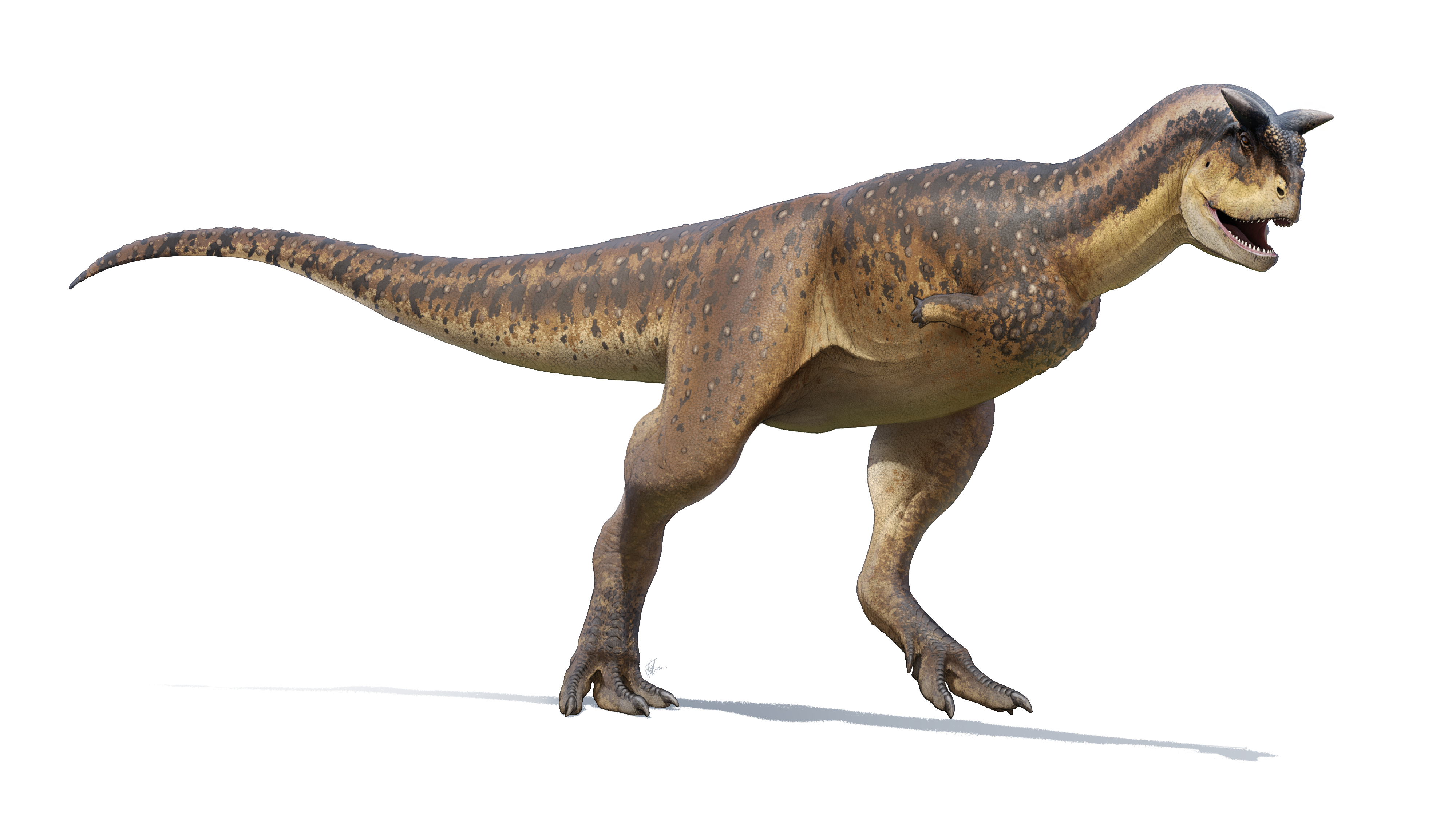
Life restoration

The lower jaw was found with ossified hyoid bones, in the position they would be in if the animal was alive. These slender bones, supporting the tongue musculature and several other muscles, are rarely found in dinosaurs because they are often cartilaginous and not connected to other bones and therefore get lost easily. (Note: p. 6 in Bonaparte (1990)) In Carnotaurus, three hyoid bones are preserved: a pair of curved, rod-like ceratobranchials that articulate with a single, trapezoidal element, the basihyal. Carnotaurus is the only known non-avian theropod from which a basihyal is known. The back of the skull had well-developed, air-filled chambers surrounding the braincase, as in other abelisaurids. Two separate chamber systems were present, the paratympanic system, which was connected to the middle ear cavity, as well as chambers resulting from outgrowths of the air sacs of the neck.

A number of autapomorphies (distinguishing features) can be found in the skull, including the pair of horns and the very short and deep skull. The maxilla had excavations above the promaxillary fenestra, which would have been excavated by the antorbital air sinus (air passages in the snout). The nasolacrimal duct, which transported eye fluid, exited on the medial (inner) surface of the lacrimal through a canal of uncertain function. Other proposed autapomorphies include a deep and long, air-filled excavation in the quadrate and an elongated depression on the pterygoid of the palate.

=== Vertebrae ===
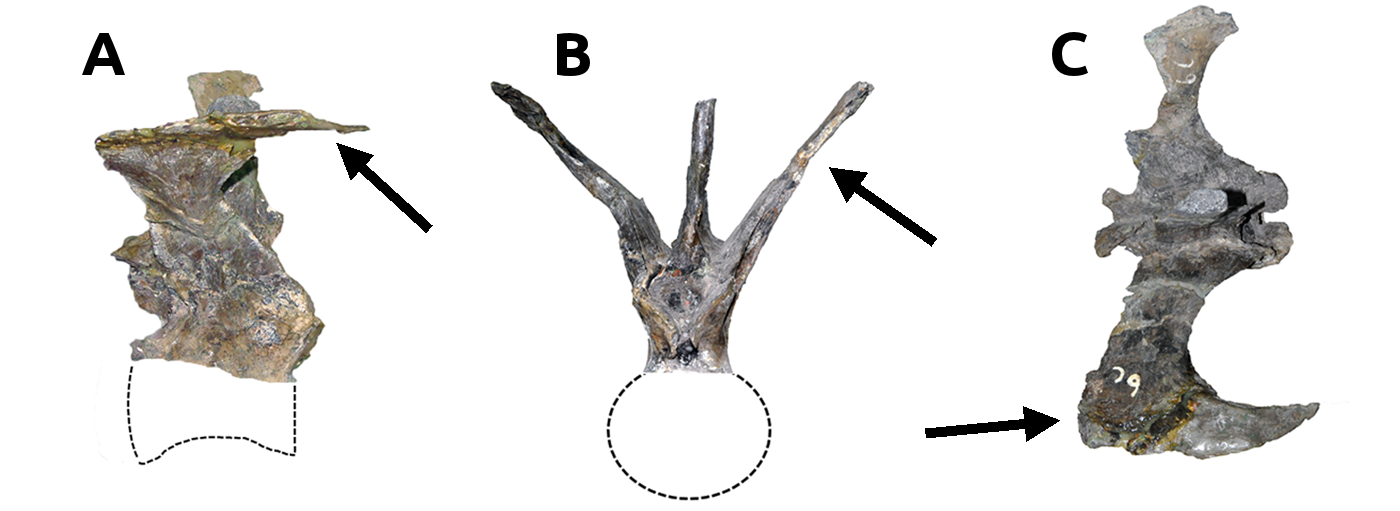
Sixth tail vertebra of the holotype in A) side, B) front and C) top views, with arrows indicating the highly modified caudal ribs

The vertebral column consisted of ten cervical (neck), twelve dorsal, six fused sacral (Note: p. 191 in Carrano and Sampson (2008)) and an unknown number of caudal (tail) vertebrae. The neck was nearly straight, rather than having the S-curve seen in other theropods, and also unusually wide, especially towards its base. The top of the neck's spinal column featured a double row of enlarged, upwardly directed bony processes called epipophyses, creating a smooth trough on the top of the neck vertebrae. These processes were the highest points of the spine, towering above the unusually low spinous processes. The epipophyses probably provided attachment areas for a markedly strong neck musculature. (Note: pp. 257 in Novas (2009)) A similar double row was also present in the tail, formed there by highly modified caudal ribs, in front view protruding upwards in a V-shape, their inner sides creating a smooth, flat, top surface of the front tail vertebrae. The end of each caudal rib was furnished with a forward projecting hook-shaped expansion that connected to the caudal rib of the preceding vertebra.

=== Forelimbs ===
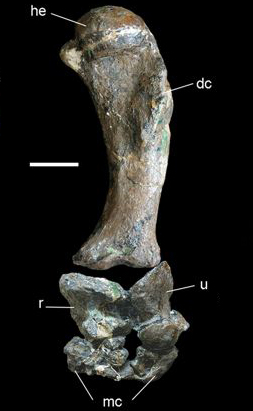
Forelimb bones (left) and hand bones as interpreted by Ruiz and colleagues (2011)

The forelimbs were proportionally shorter than in any other large carnivorous dinosaurs, including tyrannosaurids. (Note: p. 1276 in Ruiz et al. (2011)) The forearm was only a quarter the size of the upper arm. There were no carpalia in the hand, so that the metacarpals articulated directly with the forearm. The hand showed four basic digits, though apparently only the middle two of these ended in finger bones, while the fourth consisted of a single splint-like metacarpal that may have represented an external 'spur'. The fingers themselves were fused and immobile, and may have lacked claws. Carnotaurus differed from all other abelisaurids in having proportionally shorter and more robust forelimbs, and in having the fourth, splint-like metacarpal as the longest bone in the hand. A 2009 study suggests that the arms were vestigial in abelisaurids, because nerve fibers responsible for stimulus transmission were reduced to an extent seen in today's emus and kiwis, which also have vestigial forelimbs.

=== Skin ===
Carnotaurus was the first theropod dinosaur discovered with a significant number of fossil skin impressions. These impressions, found beneath the skeleton's right side, come from different body parts, including the lower jaw, the front of the neck, the shoulder girdle, and the rib cage. (Note: p. 32 in Bonaparte (1990)) The largest patch of skin corresponds to the anterior part of the tail. (Note: p. 32 in Bonaparte (1990)) Originally, the right side of the skull also was covered with large patches of skin—this was not recognized when the skull was prepared, and these patches were accidentally destroyed. However, the surface texture of several skull bones allows for inferences on their probable covering. A hummocky surface with grooves, pits, and small openings is found on the sides and front of the snout and indicates a scaly covering, possibly with flat scales as in today's crocodilians. The top of the snout was sculptured with numerous small holes and spikes – this texture can probably be correlated with a cornified pad (horny covering). Such a pad also occurred in Majungasaurus but was absent in Abelisaurus and Rugops. A row of large scales did probably surround the eye, as indicated by a hummocky surface with longitudinal grooves on the lacrimal and postorbital bones. (Note: p. 3 in Bonaparte (1990))

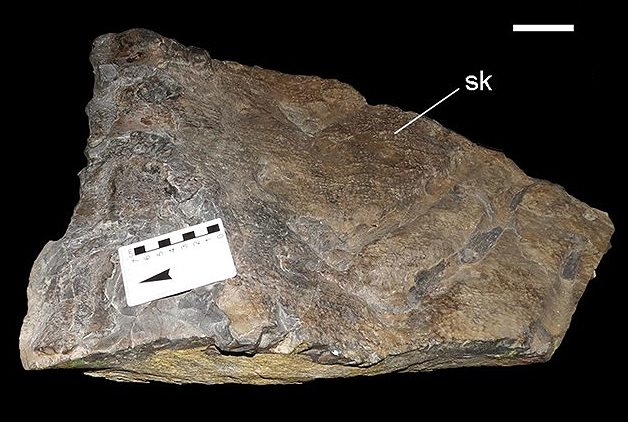
Skin impressions from the tail

The skin was built up of a mosaic of polygonal, non-overlapping scales measuring approximately 5–12 mm (0.20–0.47 in) in diameter. This mosaic was divided by thin, parallel grooves. (Note: pp. 264–299 in Novas (2009)) Scalation was similar across different body parts with the exception of the head, which apparently showed a different, irregular pattern of scales. (Note: pp. 264–299 in Novas (2009)) There is no evidence of feathers. Larger bump-like structures were distributed over the sides of the neck, back and tail in irregular rows. These bumps were 4 to 5 cm (1.6 to 2.0 in) in diameter and up to 5 cm (2.0 in) in height and often showed a low midline ridge. They were set 8 to 10 cm (3.1 to 3.9 in) apart from each other and became larger towards the animal's top. The bumps probably represent feature scales – clusters of condensed scutes – similar to those seen on the soft frill running along the body midline in hadrosaurid ("duck-billed") dinosaurs. These structures did not contain bone. (Note: p. 32 in Bonaparte (1990)) Stephen Czerkas (1997) suggested that these structures may have protected the animal's sides while fighting members of the same species (conspecifics) and other theropods, arguing that similar structures can be found on the neck of the modern iguana where they provide limited protection in combat.

More recent studies of the skin of Carnotaurus published in 2021 suggest that previous depictions of the scales on the body are inaccurate, and the larger feature scales were randomly distributed along the body, not distributed in discrete rows like in older artistic depictions and illustrations. There is also no sign of progressive size variation in feature scales along different areas along the body. The basement scales of Carnotaurus were by comparison highly variable, ranging in size from small and elongated, to large and polygonal, and from circular-to-lenticular in the thoracic, scapular, and tail regions, respectively. This scale differentiation may have been related to regulating body heat and shedding excess heat via thermoregulation due to its large body size and active lifestyle.

== Classification ==
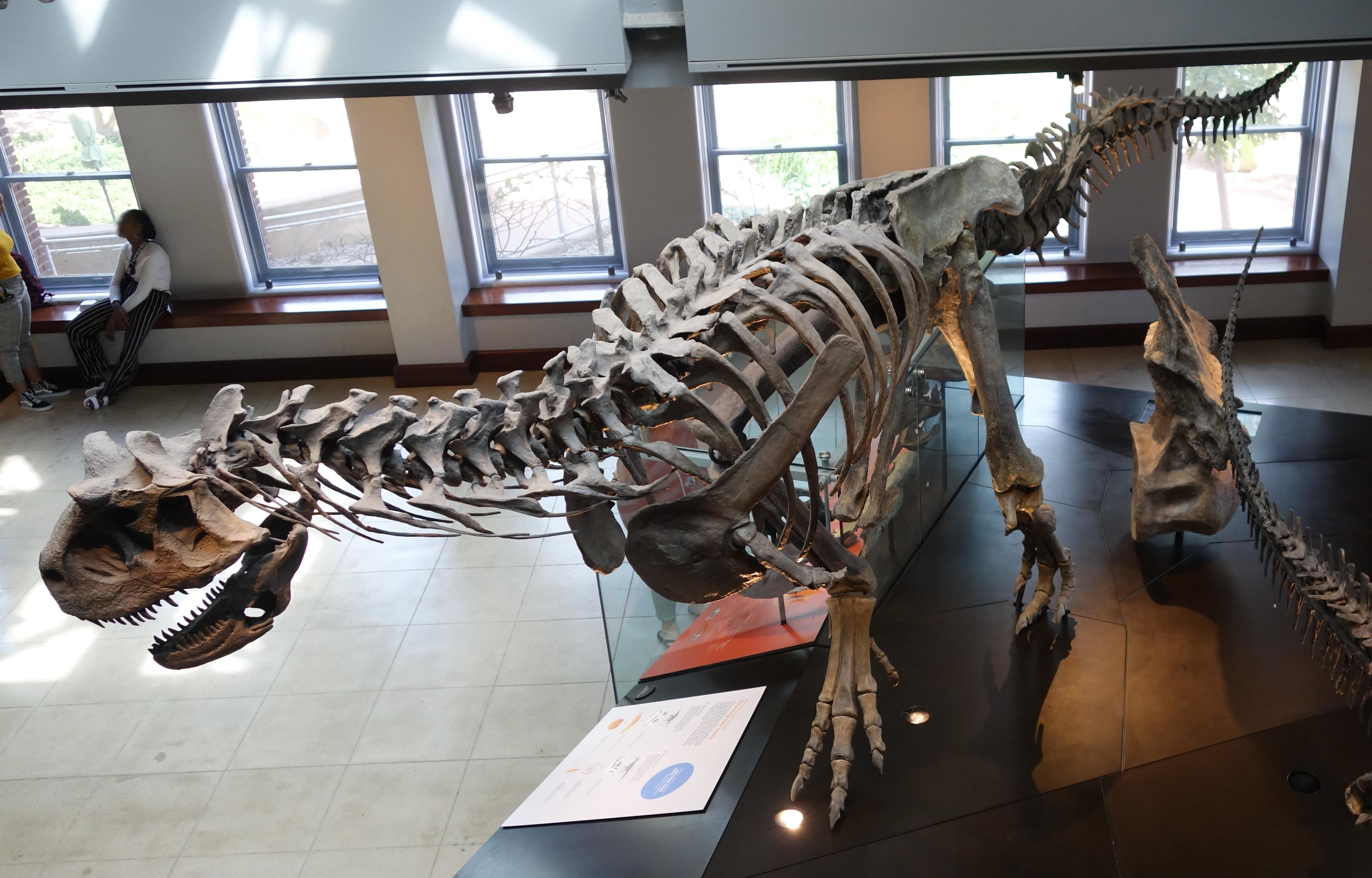
Mount in LA seen from above

Carnotaurus is one of the best-understood genera of the Abelisauridae, a family of large theropods restricted to the ancient southern supercontinent Gondwana. Abelisaurids were the dominant predators in the Late Cretaceous of Gondwana, replacing the carcharodontosaurids and occupying the ecological niche filled by the tyrannosaurids in the northern continents. Several notable traits that evolved within this family, including shortening of the skull and arms as well as peculiarities in the cervical and caudal vertebrae, were more pronounced in Carnotaurus than in any other abelisaurid. (Note: p. 276–277 in Novas (2009)) (Note: pp. 256–261 in Novas (2009))

Though relationships within the Abelisauridae are debated, Carnotaurus is consistently shown to be one of the most derived members of the family by cladistical analyses. (Note: pp. 188–189 and 202 in Carrano and Sampson (2008)) Its nearest relative might have been Aucasaurus or Majungasaurus. A 2008 review, in contrast, suggested that Carnotaurus was not closely related to either genus, and instead proposed Ilokelesia as its sister taxon. (Note: p. 202 in Carrano and Sampson (2008)) Juan Canale and colleagues, in 2009, erected the new clade Brachyrostra to include Carnotaurus but not Majungasaurus; this classification has been followed by a number of studies since.

Carnotaurus is eponymous for two subgroups of the Abelisauridae: the Carnotaurinae and the Carnotaurini. Paleontologists do not universally accept these groups. The Carnotaurinae was defined to include all derived abelisaurids with the exclusion of Abelisaurus, which is considered a basal member in most studies. However, a 2008 review suggested that Abelisaurus was a derived abelisaurid instead. (Note: p. 202 in Carrano and Sampson (2008)) Carnotaurini was proposed to name the clade formed by Carnotaurus and Aucasaurus; only those paleontologists who consider Aucasaurus as the nearest relative of Carnotaurus use this group. A 2024 study recovered Carnotaurini as a valid clade consisting of Carnotaurus, Aucasaurus, Niebla and Koleken.

Below is a cladogram published by Canale and colleagues in 2009.

- Carnotaurinae
  - Majungasaurus
  - Brachyrostra
    - Carnotaurini
      - Aucasaurus
      - Carnotaurus
    - - Ilokelesia
      - - Skorpiovenator
        - Ekrixinatosaurus

== Paleobiology ==
=== Function of the horns ===
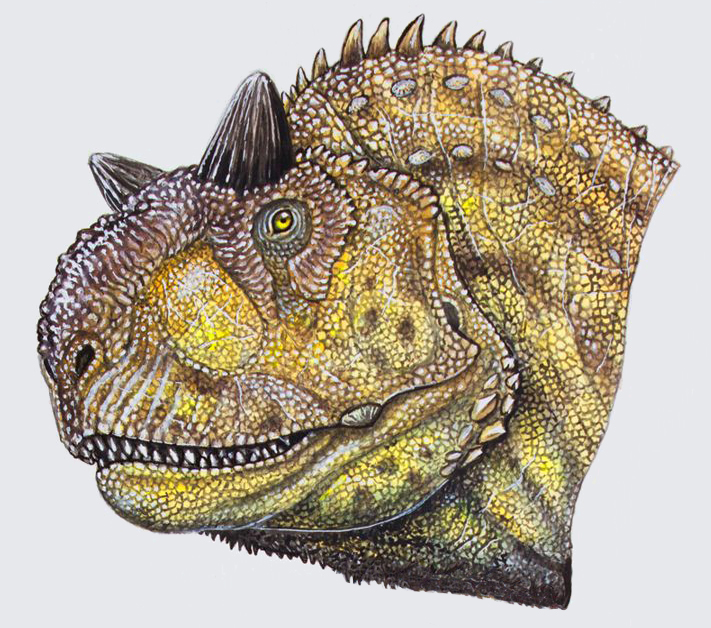
Restoration of the head showing the soft tissues inferred from osteological morphology of the skull

Carnotaurus is the only known carnivorous bipedal animal with a pair of horns on the frontal bone. The use of these horns is not entirely clear. Several interpretations have revolved around use in fighting conspecifics or in killing prey, though a use in display for courtship or recognition of members of the same species is possible as well.

Greg Paul (1988) proposed that the horns were butting weapons and that the small orbita would have minimized the possibility of hurting the eyes while fighting. Gerardo Mazzetta and colleagues (1998) suggested that Carnotaurus used its horns in a way similar to rams. They calculated that the neck musculature was strong enough to absorb the force of two individuals colliding with their heads frontally at a speed of 5.7 m/s each. Fernando Novas (2009) interpreted several skeletal features as adaptations for delivering blows with the head. (Note: pp. 259–261 in Novas (2009)) He suggested that the shortness of the skull might have made head movements quicker by reducing the moment of inertia, while the muscular neck would have allowed strong head blows. He also noted an enhanced rigidity and strength of the spinal column that may have evolved to withstand shocks conducted by the head and neck. (Note: pp. 260–261 in Novas (2009))

Other studies suggest that rivaling Carnotaurus did not deliver rapid head blows, but pushed slowly against each other with the upper sides of their skulls. Mazzetta and colleagues, in 2009, argued that the horns may have been a device for the distribution of compression forces without damage to the brain. This is supported by the flattened upper sides of the horns, the strongly fused bones of the top of the skull, and the inability of the skull to survive rapid head blows. Rafael Delcourt, in 2018, suggested that the horns could have been used either in slow headbutting and shoving, as seen in the modern marine iguana, or in blows to the opponent's neck and flanks, as seen in the modern giraffe. The latter possibility had been previously proposed for the related Majungasaurus in a 2011 conference paper.

Gerardo Mazzetta and colleagues (1998) propose that the horns might also have been used to injure or kill small prey. Though horn cores are blunt, they may have had a similar form to modern bovid horns if there was a keratinous covering. However, this would be the only reported example of horns being used as hunting weapons in animals.

=== Jaw function and diet ===
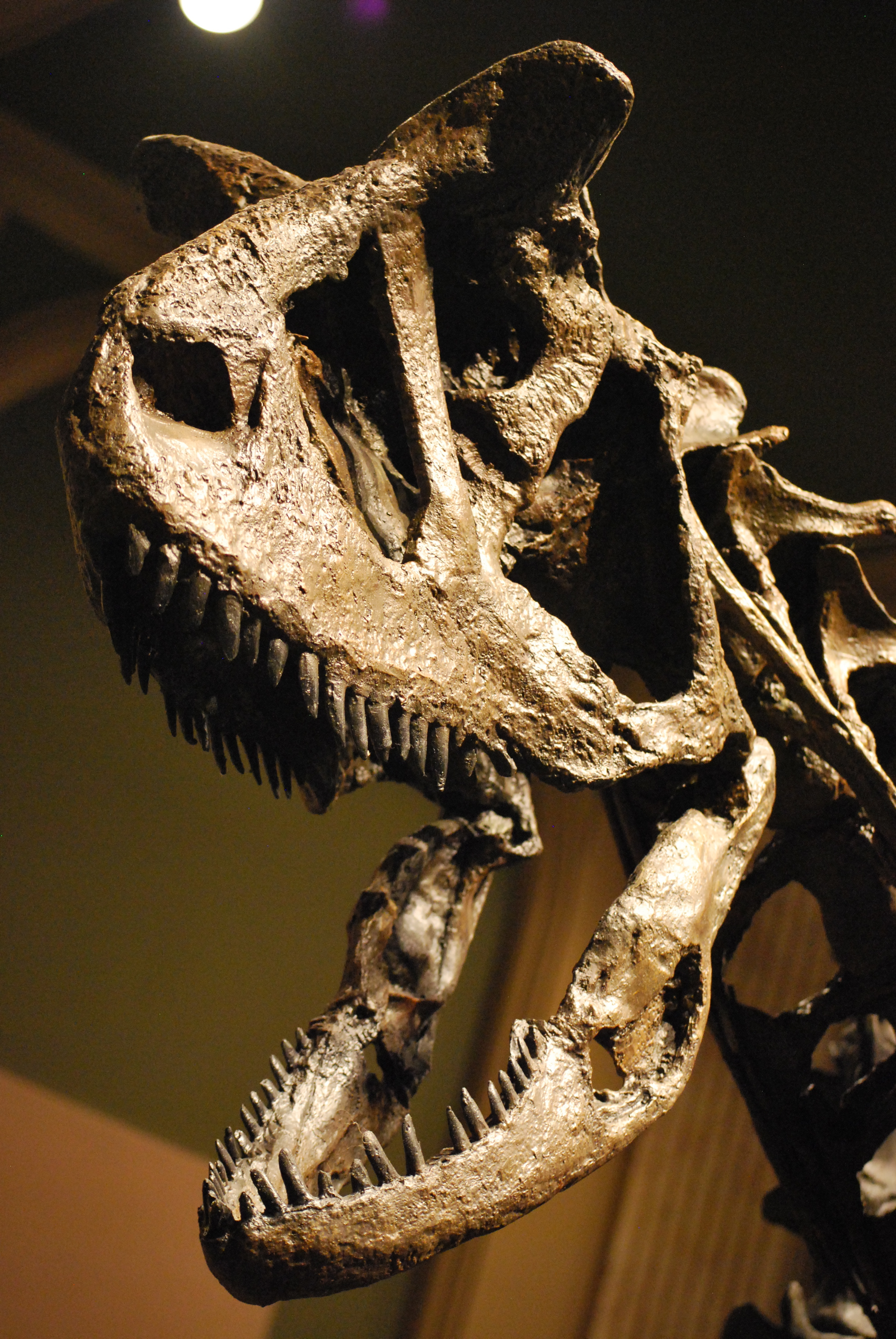
Skull cast, Dinosaur Discovery Museum, Kenosha, Wisconsin

Analyses of the jaw structure of Carnotaurus by Mazzetta and colleagues, in 1998, 2004, and 2009, suggest that the animal was capable of quick bites, but not strong ones. Quick bites are more important than strong bites when capturing small prey, as shown by studies of modern-day crocodiles. These researchers also noted a high degree of flexibility (kinesis) within the skull and especially the lower jaw, somewhat similar to modern snakes. Elasticity of the jaw would have allowed Carnotaurus to swallow small prey items whole. In addition, the front part of the lower jaw was hinged, and thus able to move up and down. When pressed downwards, the teeth would have projected forward, allowing Carnotaurus to spike small prey items; when the teeth were curved upwards, the now backward projecting teeth would have hindered the caught prey from escaping. Mazzetta and colleagues also found that the skull was able to withstand forces that appear when tugging on large prey items. Carnotaurus may therefore have fed mainly on relatively small prey, but also was able to hunt large dinosaurs. In 2009, Mazzetta and colleagues estimated a bite force of around 3,341 newtons. A 2022 study estimating bite force for 33 different dinosaurs suggests that the bite force in Carnotaurus was around 3,392 newtons at the anterior portion of the jaws; slightly higher than the previous estimate. The posterior bite force at the back of the jaws meanwhile, was estimated at 7,172 newtons.

This interpretation was questioned by François Therrien and colleagues (2005), who found that the biting force of Carnotaurus was twice that of the American alligator, which may have the strongest bite of any living tetrapod. These researchers also noted analogies with modern Komodo dragons: the flexural strength of the lower jaw decreases towards the tip linearly, indicating that the jaws were not suited for high precision catching of small prey but for delivering slashing wounds to weaken big prey. As a consequence, according to this study, Carnotaurus must have mainly preyed upon large animals, possibly by ambush. Cerroni and colleagues, in 2020, argued that flexibility was restricted to the lower jaw, while the thickened skull roof and the ossification of several cranial joints suggest that the skull had no or only little kinesis.

Robert Bakker (1998) found that Carnotaurus mainly fed upon very large prey, especially sauropods. As he noted, several adaptations of the skull—the short snout, the relatively small teeth and the strong back of the skull (occiput)—had independently evolved in Allosaurus. These features suggest that the upper jaw was used like a serrated club to inflict wounds; big sauropods would have been weakened by repeated attacks.

=== Locomotion ===
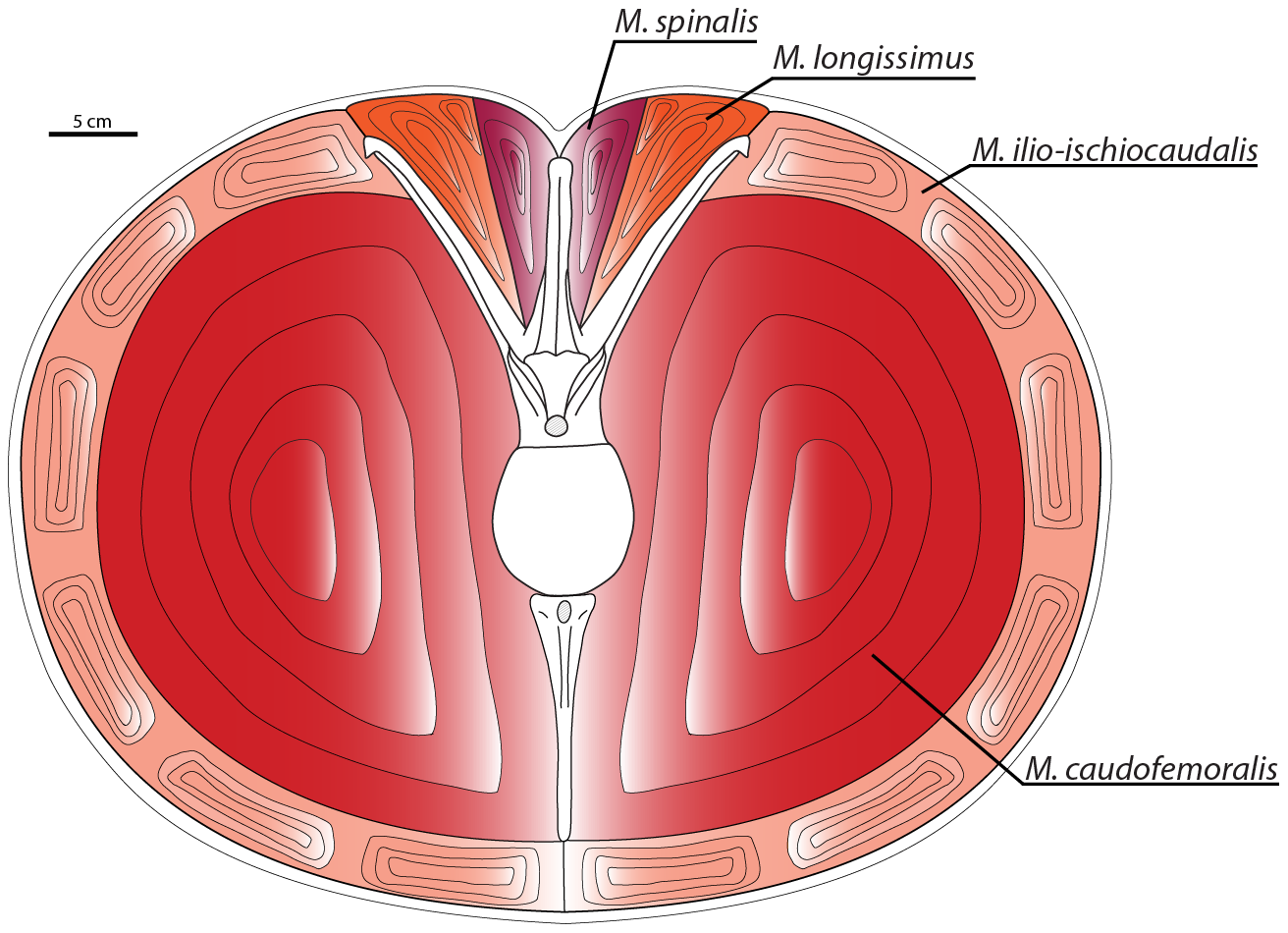
Cross section through the tail of Carnotaurus, showing the enlarged caudofemoralis muscle and the V-shaped caudal ribs

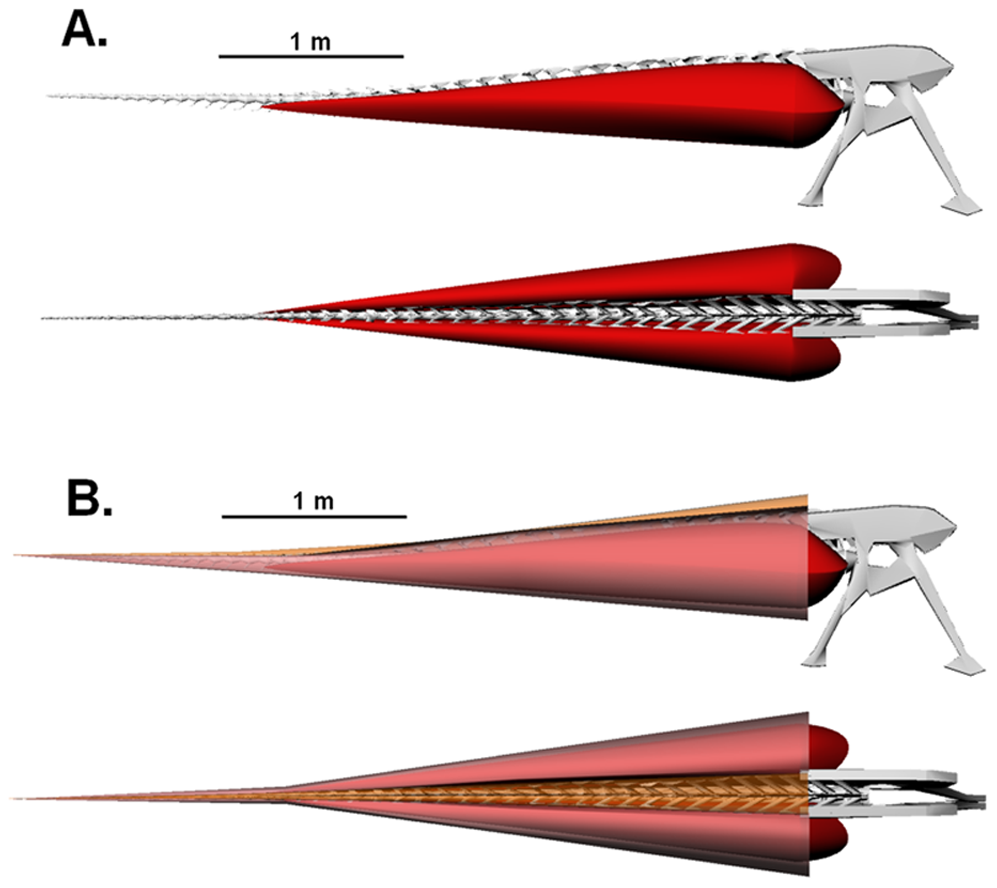
3D reconstructions of the tail muscles, tail, and pelvic bones seen from the side and above

Mazzetta and colleagues (1998, 1999) presumed that Carnotaurus was a swift runner, arguing that the thigh bone was adapted to withstand high bending moments while running. The ability of an animal's leg to withstand those forces limits its top speed. The running adaptations of Carnotaurus would have been better than those of a human, although not nearly as good as those of an ostrich. (Note: p. 186 and 190 in Mazzetta et al. (1998))

In dinosaurs, the most important locomotor muscle was located in the tail. This muscle, called the caudofemoralis, attaches to the fourth trochanter, a prominent ridge on the thigh bone, and pulls the thigh bone backwards when contracted. Scott Persons and Phil Currie (2011) argued that in the tail vertebrae of Carnotaurus, the caudal ribs did not protrude horizontally ("T-shaped"), but were angled against the vertical axis of the vertebrae, forming a "V". This would have provided additional space for a caudofemoralis muscle larger than in any other theropod—the muscle mass was calculated at 111 to 137 kilograms (245 to 302 lb) per leg. Therefore, Carnotaurus could have been one of the fastest large theropods. While the caudofemoralis muscle was enlarged, the epaxial muscles situated above the caudal ribs would have been proportionally smaller. These muscles, called the longissimus and spinalis muscle, were responsible for tail movement and stability. To maintain tail stability in spite of reduction of these muscles, the caudal ribs bear forward projecting processes interlocking the vertebrae with each other and with the pelvis, stiffening the tail. As a consequence, the ability to make tight turns would have been diminished, because the hip and tail had to be turned simultaneously, unlike in other theropods.

=== Brain and senses ===
Cerroni and Paulina-Carabajal, in 2019, used a CT scan to study the endocranial cavity that contained the brain. The volume of the endocranial cavity was 168.8 cm^{3}, although the brain would only have filled a fraction of this space. The authors used two different brain size estimates, assuming a brain size of 50% and 37% of the endocranial cavity, respectively. This results in a reptile encephalization quotient (a measure of intelligence) larger than that of the related Majungasaurus but smaller than in tyrannosaurids. The pineal gland, which produces hormones, might have been smaller than in other abelisaurids, as indicated by a low dural expansion – a space on top of the forebrain in which the pineal gland is thought to have been located.

The olfactory bulbs, which housed the sense of smell, were large, while the optic lobes, which were responsible for sight, were relatively small. This indicates that the sense of smell might have been better developed than the sense of sight, while the opposite is the case in modern birds. The front end of the olfactory tracts and bulbs were curved downwards, a feature only shared by Indosaurus; in other abelisaurids, these structures were oriented horizontally. As hypothesized by Cerroni and Paulina-Carabajal, this downward-curvature, together with the large size of the bulbs, might indicate that Carnotaurus relied more on the sense of smell than other abelisaurids. The flocculus, a brain lobe thought to be correlated with gaze stabilization (coordination between eyes and body), was large in Carnotaurus and other South American abelisaurids. This could indicate that these forms frequently used quick movements of the head and body. Hearing might have been poorly developed in Carnotaurus and other abelisaurids, as indicated by the short lagena of the inner ear. The hearing range was estimated to be below 3 kHz.

== Age and paleoenvironment ==
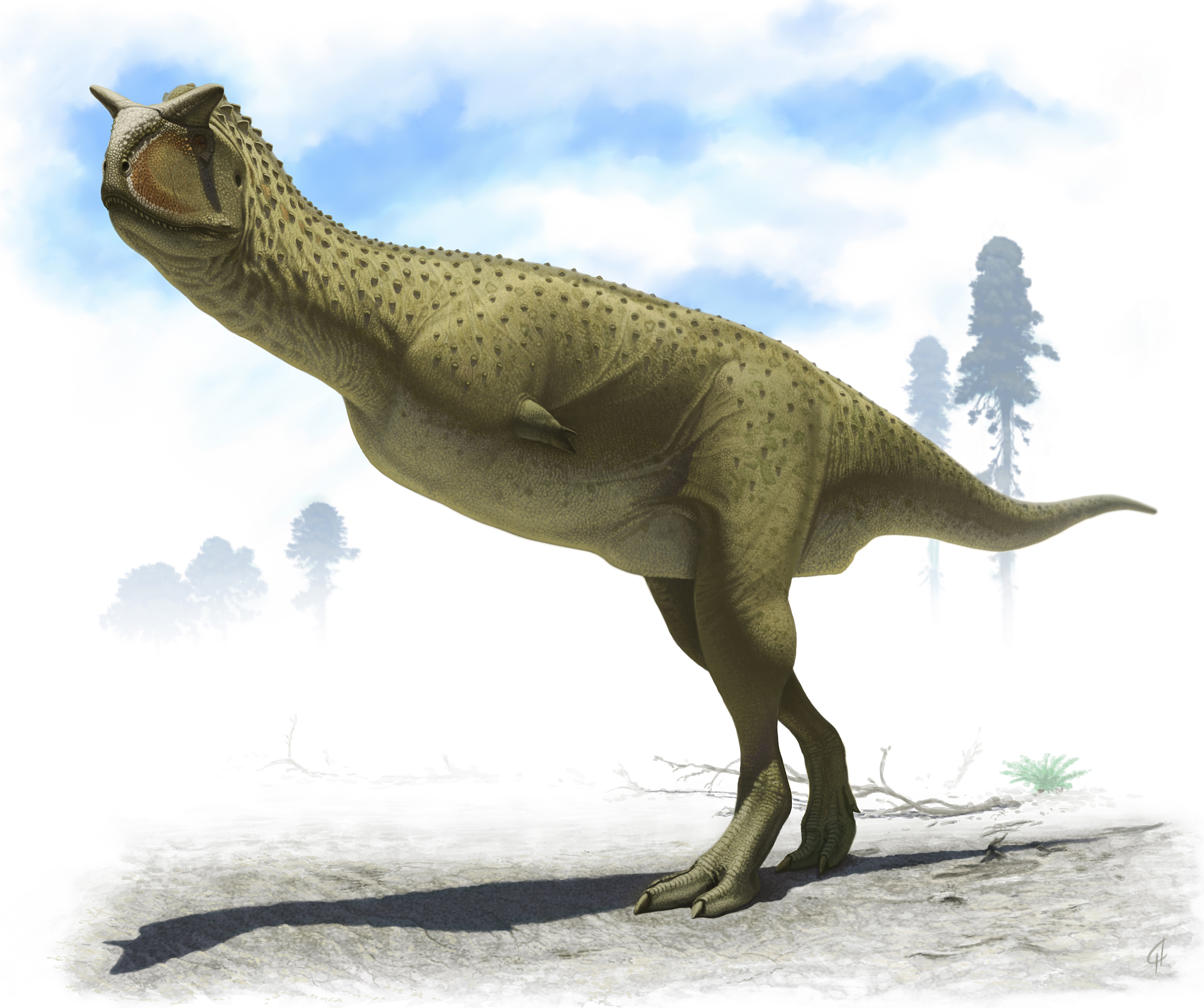
Carnotaurus in environment

Originally, the rocks in which Carnotaurus was found were assigned to the upper part of the Gorro Frigio Formation, which was considered to be approximately 100 million years old (Albian or Cenomanian stage). (Note: p. 3 in Bonaparte (1990)) Later, they were realized to pertain to the much younger La Colonia Formation, which, according to a 2021 study, dates to the Maastrichtian to lower Danian ages around 69–64 million years ago. Carnotaurus was the latest South American abelisaurid known. By the Late Cretaceous, South America was already isolated from both Africa and North America.

The La Colonia Formation is exposed over the southern slope of the North Patagonian Massif. Most vertebrate fossils, including Carnotaurus, come from the formation's middle section (called the middle facies association). This part likely represents the deposits of an environment of estuaries, tidal flats or coastal plains. The climate would have been seasonal with both dry and humid periods. The most common vertebrates collected include ceratodontid lungfish, turtles, plesiosaurs, crocodiles, dinosaurs, lizards, snakes and mammals. Other dinosaurs include Koleken inakayali, which is closely related to Carnotaurus; the saltasauroid titanosaur Titanomachya gimenezi; an unnamed ankylosaur; and an unnamed hadrosauroid, among others. Some of the snakes that have been found belong to the families Boidae and Madtsoiidae, such as Alamitophis argentinus. Turtles are represented by at least five taxa, four from Chelidae (Pleurodira) and one from Meiolaniidae (Cryptodira). Plesiosaurs include two elasmosaurs (Kawanectes and Chubutinectes) and a polycotylid (Sulcusuchus). Mammals are represented by Reigitherium bunodontum and Coloniatherium cilinskii, the former of which was considered the first record of a South American docodont, and the possible gondwanatherians or multituberculates Argentodites coloniensis and Ferugliotherium windhauseni. Remains of an enantiornithine and, possibly, of a neornithine bird have been discovered.

== See also ==
- Timeline of ceratosaur research
