= LACM 149371 =

Enigmatic fossil mammalian

LACM 149371 (Natural History Museum of Los Angeles County specimen 149371) is an enigmatic fossil mammalian tooth from the Paleogene (66 to 23 million years ago, mya) of Peru. It is from the Santa Rosa fossil site, which is of uncertain age but possibly late Eocene (55 to 34 mya) or Oligocene (34 to 23 mya). The tooth is poorly preserved and may have been degraded by acidic water or because it passed through a predator's digestive tract. Its largest dimension is 2.65 mm. It is triangular in shape and bears six cusps that surround the middle of the tooth, where there are three basins (fossae). Crests connects the cusps and separate the fossae. The microscopic structure of the enamel is poorly preserved.

LACM 149371 was described in 2004 by Francisco Goin and colleagues, who tentatively interpreted the tooth as a left last upper molar. Although they saw similarities with South American ungulates, some early rodents, and multituberculates, they believed the tooth was most likely of a gondwanathere. Among gondwanatheres—a small and poorly known group otherwise known from the Cretaceous through Eocene of some of the southern continents (Gondwana)—they thought the Cretaceous Argentinian Ferugliotherium to be the most similar.

== Discovery and context ==
LACM 149371 was discovered in 1998 at the Santa Rosa fossil site in the Ucayali Region of Peru. The Santa Rosa fauna also contains fossils of various unique species of marsupials and hystricognath rodents, a possible bat, and some notoungulates. The fauna was published in a volume of the Science Series of the Natural History Museum of Los Angeles County in 2004, which included a paper by Francisco Goin and colleagues that described and discussed LACM 149371.

The age of the Santa Rosa fauna remains highly uncertain, as the outcrop where the fossils were found cannot easily be placed in a known stratigraphical unit, and the fossils are so distinct from other known fossil faunas that biostratigraphy cannot provide a precise estimate. In a summary of the 2004 volume, Kenneth Campbell tentatively referred Santa Rosa to the Mustersan South American Land Mammal Age (SALMA), which he placed near the Eocene–Oligocene boundary, around 35 million years ago. However, Mario Vucetich and colleagues suggested in 2010 that the Santa Rosa fauna may be substantially later—perhaps as young as the Deseadan SALMA (late Oligocene, around 25 million years ago). According to Campbell, the Santa Rosa mammals likely lived in a savanna habitat that contained rivers.

== Description ==
LACM 149371 is a poorly preserved molar-like tooth that largely lacks a recognizable enamel surface and shows many small grooves and holes on the crown surface. This suggests the tooth may have been chemically degraded, perhaps by acidic water or because it passed through the digestive tract of a predator. The roots are broken off, but remaining pulp cavities suggest the presence of four main roots, which are partially joined into two pairs. A smaller pulp cavity between those roots suggests the likely presence of a fifth root and a slight depression in the tooth may represent another root.

The crown of the tooth is triangular and contains six cusps, connected by low crests, that surround two prominent, low-lying fossae (basins) and a third, smaller fossa. Because of the complexity of the crown, Goin and colleagues interpreted it as a molar; because of the number of roots, the arrangement of the cusps, and the shape of the tooth, as an upper molar; and because it tapers towards the end, as a last molar. One side, the longest, is flat and low compared to the others, suggesting it is the labial (outer) face. This would imply that the tooth is from the left jaw. Under this interpretation, the length of the tooth is 2.65 mm, width is 2.20 mm, height at the labial side is 1.05 mm, and height at the lingual side is 1.30 mm.

For convenience, Goin and colleagues designated the six cusps as A through F: A on the front labial corner of the tooth; B on the labial face; C on the back corner; D on the lingual (inner) face; E on the front lingual corner; and F on the front face. The large front fossa is located between cusps A, B, D, E, and F; the smaller intermediate fossa is between cusps B and D; and the much smaller back fossa is just in front of cusp C. All three are nearly round. Cusp A, the largest cusp, is triangular in shape and is separated from the smaller, rounded B by a deep valley; a low crest connects the two cusps further lingually, separating the valley from the front fossa. At its back, B connects to a long crest that reaches the back fossa and behind it the small cusp C, which has a groove on its labial side. A valley separates it from cusp D. D itself is crest-shaped and forms the lingual wall of the intermediate fossa; it is described as "very odd", and may in fact consist of two fused, triangular cusps. A crest issuing from D separates the back from the intermediate fossa, and another, larger crest separates the front from the back fossa and nearly reaches cusp B. Cusp E is triangular and separated from cusps F and D by valleys, which are bordered internally by crests connecting the cusps. F is rounded. The microstructure of the tooth enamel is not clearly recognizable, evidently because the tooth is degraded, though structures resembling enamel prisms (bundles of hydroxyapatite crystals) and Hunter-Schreger bands are recognizable.

== Identity ==
Because of the complexity of the crown, Goin and colleagues identified the tooth as a mammal; although some non-mammalian groups, like crocodylians, may have complex teeth, none approach the level of complexity seen in LACM 149371. They could find no resemblance to australosphenidans including monotremes, metatherians including marsupials, xenarthrans, and some related groups. They did see some general resemblances to the upper premolars of the early South American ungulates, but the cusp arrangement is different from that of any ungulate. There are also some resemblances to the early rodents Ivanantonia from Asia and Nonomys from North America, but Ivanantonia has a central groove and lacks fossae, and Nonomys has a prominent cingulum (shelf) at the edges of the tooth and also lacks the fossae of LACM 149371.

The tooth resembles multituberculates—a large group of extinct mammals with many-cusped teeth—in the shapes of the valleys and crests, but multituberculates lack fossae and usually have quadrangular teeth with two longitudinal rows of cusps separated by a central valley. In the same features, LACM 149371 resembles gondwanatheres, a small and enigmatic group of mammals from the Cretaceous through Eocene of the southern (Gondwanan) continents that may be related to multituberculates. In particular, Ferugliotherium from the late Cretaceous of Argentina has similarly formed cusps and also has crests that connect the cusps to the center of the tooth. However, the upper molars are unknown, and the low-crowned teeth of Ferugliotherium lack deep fossae. Members of the higher-crowned gondwanathere family Sudamericidae do have fossae. Goin and colleagues conclude that LACM 149371 most likely represents a member of the gondwanathere family Ferugliotheriidae; if so, it would be among the youngest known gondwanatheres.
