= Trapalcotherium =

Trapalcotherium Temporal range: Late Cretaceous (?Maastrichtian)

Scientific classification
- Kingdom: Animalia
- Phylum: Chordata
- Class: Mammalia
- Family: †Ferugliotheriidae
- Genus: †Trapalcotherium; Rougier et al., 2009
- Species: †T. matuastensis

Binomial name
- †Trapalcotherium matuastensis Rougier et al., 2009

Extinct family of mammals

Trapalcotherium is a fossil mammal from the Cretaceous of Argentina in the family Ferugliotheriidae. The single species, T. matuastensis, is known from one tooth, a first lower molar. It is from the Allen Formation, which is probably Maastrichtian in age, and was first described in 2009. The tooth bears two rows of cusps, one at the inner (lingual) side and the other at the outer (labial) side, which are connected by transverse ridges separated by deep valleys. This pattern is reminiscent of Ferugliotherium, a gondwanathere mammal from similarly aged deposits in Argentina, and Trapalcotherium is therefore recognized as a member of the same family Ferugliotheriidae. Ferugliotheriidae is one of two families of gondwanatheres, an enigmatic group without close relationships to any living mammals.

== Discovery and naming ==
The only known fossil of Trapalcotherium was found at Cerro Tortuga in Río Negro Province, southern Argentina. This locality is in the Allen Formation, one of three formations (rock units) that have yielded Late Cretaceous gondwanathere fossils from Argentina (the others are the Los Alamitos and La Colonia Formations). All three are probably about equally old, from the Maastrichtian (latest Cretaceous, about 71–66 million years ago, mya) and perhaps partly the Campanian (84–71 mya). The mammals from the Allen Formation are known from seven teeth, six of which represent four species of dryolestoids—a group of primitive mammals that dominates the Late Cretaceous mammalian faunas of Argentina. The fauna was described in a 2009 paper by Guillermo Rougier and colleagues, who named Trapalcotherium as well as several new dryolestoids. The generic name, Trapalcotherium, combines the name of the basin where Cerro Tortuga is located, Bajo Trapalca, with the Greek therion "beast", commonly used to mean "mammal" in scientific names. The specific name, matuastensis, derives from Puesto El Matuesto, a shed used by the paleontologists who collected the fossils from the Allen Formation.

== Description ==
The single tooth of Trapalcotherium is identified as a lower molar because it has two longitudinal rows of cusps; as a first molar because it is longer than wide; and as a left tooth because the left side (interpreted as labial, in the direction of the lips) bears more cusps than the right side (lingual, the direction of the tongue). The tooth is 2.48 mm long and 2.07 mm wide. Part of the back labial corner is missing.

The lingual row contains three cusps and the labial probably five (the broken corner renders the number uncertain). Transverse ridges, separated by deep valleys, connect the lingual and labial cusps; therefore, the cusps are not strongly separate, but rather fused. The lingual cusps are larger and separated by larger valleys than the labial ones. At the front of the tooth is a triangular structure consisting of the first lingual and the first two labial cusps. A low crest connects the first lingual to the first labial cusp and a stronger crest, separated from the first by a relatively shallow valley, connects the second lingual to the first labial cusp. Behind this structure, a second triangle is formed by two crests passing from the second lingual cusp to two cusps at the labial side (the back of the two is broken away, but its existence is presumed from the crown pattern). The front of these two crests is interrupted by a groove. The third lingual cusp is also connected to two crests, which encircle a small depression and presumably connected to one or more labial cusps, which are missing from the fossil.

== Classification ==
Trapalcotherium is identified as a member of Gondwanatheria—a small and enigmatic group of mammals from Cretaceous and Paleogene of the southern continents (Gondwana)—on the basis of the transverse ridges and triangle on its crown. It resembles Ferugliotherium from the Los Alamitos Formation, the only previously known uncontroversial member of the family Ferugliotheriidae, but differs in some characters: the triangle at the front is narrower in Trapalcotherium; the valley behind the front triangle is less curved; the ridges attached to the second lingual cusp form another triangle; the tooth is relatively shorter; Trapalcotherium does not have the Y-shaped valleys between cusps seen in Ferugliotherium; and the tips of the lingual cusps are more labially placed. The evolutionary affinities of gondwanatheres, which include the Ferugliotheriidae and the higher-crowned Sudamericidae, are controversial, though a relationship with multituberculates (a large group mainly known from the northern continents of Laurasia) has repeatedly been proposed; the identification of Trapalcotherium does not provide additional information that has a bearing on the relationships of the gondwanatheres.
