= Caudal rib =

Rib in the tail of a vertebrate

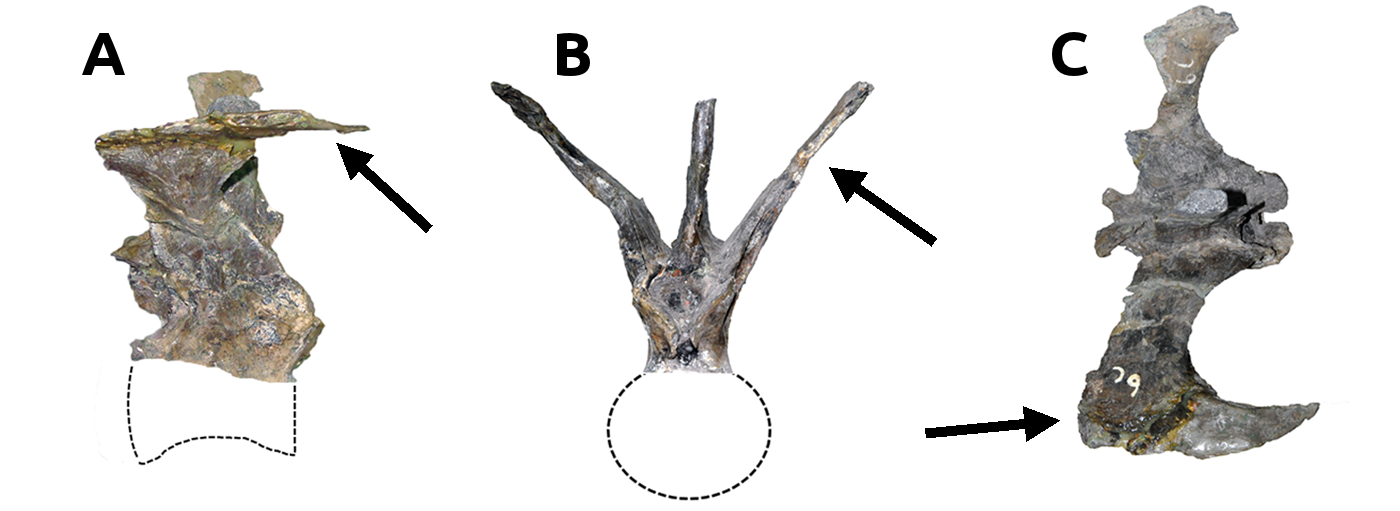
Prominent caudal ribs on a vertebra of the theropod dinosaur Carnotaurus

A caudal rib is a rib that occurs in the tail of a vertebrate. They are commonly present on the more anterior caudal vertebrae of reptiles and early tetrapods. In many taxa, they are fused with the vertebrae, though they were separate in some early reptiles such as protorothyrids and the suture between the rib and vertebra is sometimes visible in crocodilians. In taxa where the caudal ribs are fused to the vertebrae, the terms "transverse process" and "caudal rib" are sometimes used interchangeably, but the caudal rib may form only part of the transverse process. Some species, such as the tuatara, have fused caudal ribs in the anterior portion of the tail and transverse processes that are simple projections of the vertebra, not separately-ossifying ribs, in the more posterior portion of the tail. Ribs fused to the vertebra may also be called pleurapophyses.

In tetrapodomorph fish such as Eusthenopteron, the ribs do not extend into the tail region. Caudal ribs first appear in Tiktaalik and early tetrapods such as Acanthostega and Ichthyostega.
