= Argentodites =

Argentodites Temporal range: latest Campanian-Maastrichtian, ~73–66 Ma

Scientific classification (disputed)
- Kingdom: Animalia
- Phylum: Chordata
- Class: Mammalia
- Order: incertae sedis
- Genus: †Argentodites Kielan-Jaworowska et al., 2007

Binomial name
- †Argentodites coloniensis Kielan-Jaworowska et al., 2007

Species of mammal (fossil)

Argentodites is a possible multituberculate mammal from the Cretaceous of Argentina. The single species, Argentodites coloniensis, is known from a single blade-like fourth lower premolar (p4) from the La Colonia Formation, which is mostly or entirely Maastrichtian (latest Cretaceous) in age. The p4 is 4.15 mm long and bears eight cusps on its upper margin and long associated ridges on both sides. The enamel consists of prisms that are completely or partly surrounded by a sheath and that are on average 6.57 μm apart. Zofia Kielan-Jaworowska, who described and named the fossil in 2007, regarded it as a multituberculate, perhaps a cimolodontan—and thus, a member of a mostly Laurasian (northern) group and an immigrant to Argentina from North America—on the basis of the shape of the tooth and features of its enamel. In 2009, however, two teams argued that Argentodites may in fact be close to or identical with Ferugliotherium, a member of the small Gondwanan (southern) group Gondwanatheria; although their relationships are disputed, gondwanatheres may themselves be multituberculates.

== Discovery and context ==
Argentodites is known from a single premolar tooth, MPEF 604, in the collections of the Museo Paleontológico "Egidio Feruglio" in Trelew, Argentina. It is from the middle part of the La Colonia Formation of Chubut Province, Argentina, which is Late Cretaceous (Maastrichtian and perhaps partly Campanian) in age. The premolar was described in 2007 by Zofia Kielan-Jaworowska and colleagues as a new genus and species, Argentodites coloniensis. The generic name, Argentodites, combines "Argentina" with the Ancient Greek hodites "traveler", in reference to the animal's presumed migration from North America to Argentina, and the specific name, coloniensis, refers to the La Colonia Formation.

== Description ==
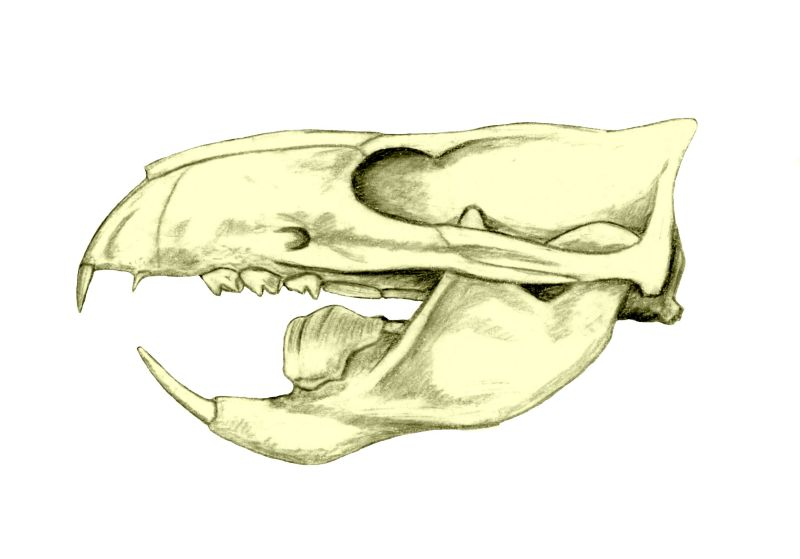
Skull of the cimolodontan multituberculate Ptilodus, showing the large fourth lower premolar (in the lower jaw, behind the incisor)

The single known example of Argentodites is a blade-like fourth lower premolar (p4). It has a length of 4.15 mm, height of 2.10 mm, and width of 1.35 mm. The crown is nearly complete, but the roots are largely missing. Kielan-Jaworowska considered two possible orientations of the tooth—one with the back margin nearly vertically, and the other with the margin inclined backward—but preferred the former, which made for more natural placement of the roots. Although the left and right sides of the tooth are almost identical, they believed the tooth is most likely a left p4, as this would make the lingual (inner) side the more convex one, as is usual in the p4 of cimolodontan multituberculates with a large p4.

The front root is larger than the back one. In side view, the upper and back margins are straight, but the front margin is convex. There are eight cusps arranged in a row on the upper margin, the first of which is located about one-third of the tooth's length from the front margin. Only the last is slightly worn, indicating that the tooth is from a young animal. Long ridges extend from the cusps diagonally toward the front on both the lingual and labial (outer) sides of the tooth. The first seven ridges on both sides are connected to the respective cusps, but the eighth ridges do not quite reach their cusp. On both sides of the tooth, there is also a small ridge behind the eighth ridge that extends to the back margin; these ridges are called the posterolabial and posterolingual ridge. An even smaller ridge is located below the ridge on the lingual side.

The tooth enamel is well preserved over most of the tooth. It consists of prisms—bundles of hydroxyapatite crystals—with an average diameter of 3.8 μm. Most are entirely surrounded by a sheath, but in some the sheath is open. The prisms are slightly curved toward the outer surface of the tooth. Between the prisms, and oriented at an angle of about 45° to them, are crystals of interprismatic material. On average, the prisms are 6.57 μm apart, so that there are about 27,247 per mm^{2}.

== Identity ==
Kielan-Jaworowska and colleagues identified Argentodites as a multituberculate, a diverse fossil group from the northern continents (Laurasia) that is also known from a few questionable or fragmentary records from the southern continents (Gondwana). They tentatively allocated it to the multituberculate subgroup Cimolodonta on the basis of its enamel microstructure, which particularly recalls Ptilodontoidea (one of the subgroups of Cimolodonta), and the convex front margin of the tooth. On the other hand, the straight back margin resembles the condition in the other major subgroup of multituberculates, the "plagiaulacidans", and it does not have the highly vaulted upper margin of p4 that is characteristic of Ptilodontoidea. They regarded Argentodites as distinct from MACN-RN 975, a fragmentary fossil mandible (lower jaw) with p4 from the Late Cretaceous Los Alamitos Formation of Argentina, which they identified as a "plagiaulacidan" multituberculate, because the p4 of MACN-RN 975 is rectangular in shape and has fewer cusps. They believed Argentodites to represent an immigrant from North America, but could not determine precisely in which part of the Cretaceous it reached South America.

In a 2009 paper on the affinities of Gondwanatheria, Yamila Gurovich and Robin Beck argue that the difference in shape between MACN-RN 975 and Argentodites is due to extensive wear on the former specimen; they write that the parts of the p4 that are not worn are virtually identical to the equivalents parts of the Argentodites p4. In addition, MACN-RN 975 is said to have as many ridges as Argentodites and to be of approximately similar size—about 15% larger. They allocate MACN-RN 975 to the gondwanathere Ferugliotherium and consequently, they argue that Argentodites most likely represents either Ferugliotherium or some related species. In the same year, Guillermo Rougier and colleagues also suggested ferugliotherian affinities of Argentodites in a paper on the mammals of the Allen Formation, another Cretaceous rock unit of Argentina. Ferugliotherium is a gondwanathere from Late Cretaceous Argentinean deposits. Gondwanatheres are a small and enigmatic group from the late Cretaceous and Paleogene of South America, Antarctica, Madagascar, India, and perhaps Tanzania. Although the evolutionary affinities of gondwanatheres are controversial, both teams that identified Argentodites as gondwanathere believe gondwanatheres are likely themselves multituberculates or closely related to them.
