= Caudal vertebrae =

Vertebrae of the tail

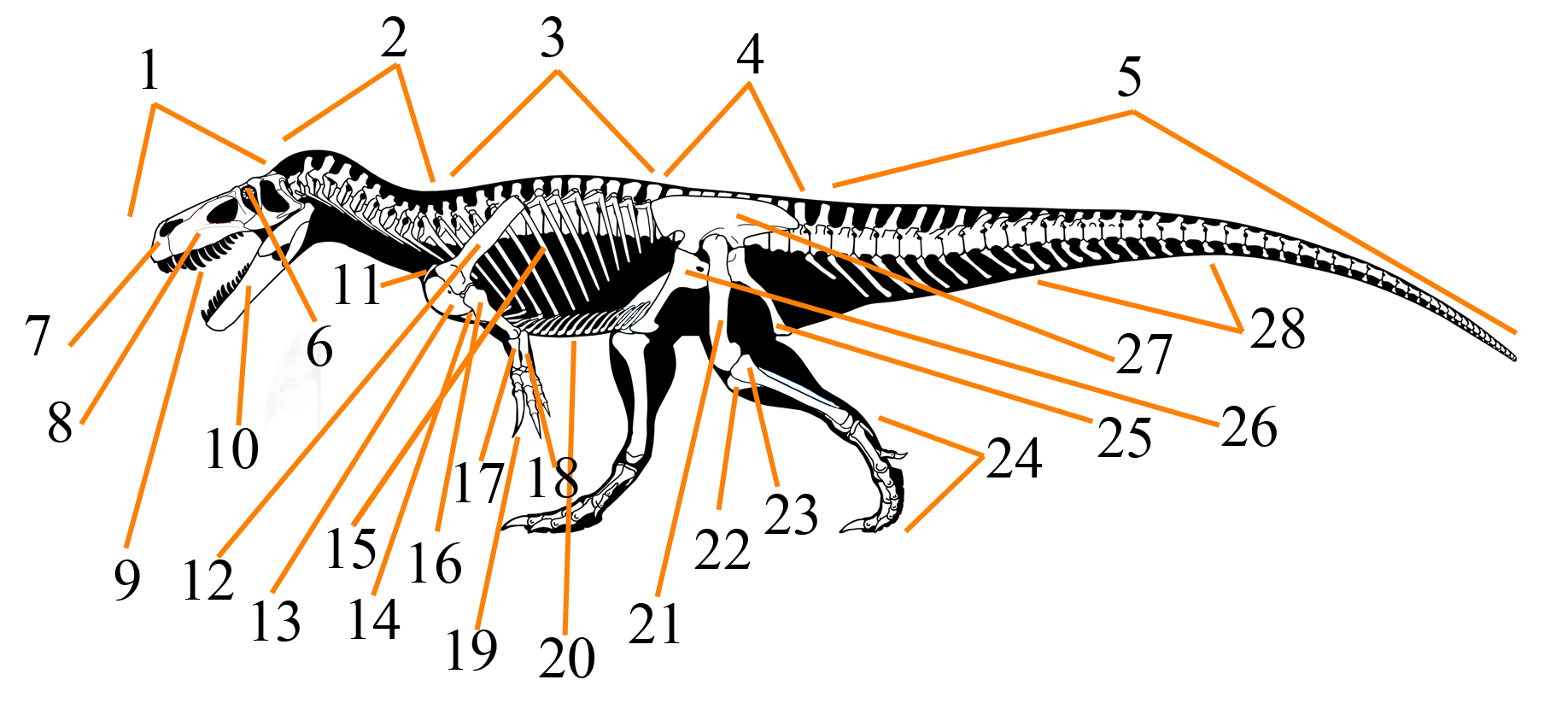
Skeleton of the dinosaur Torvosaurus, with the caudal vertebrae labelled "5"

Caudal vertebrae are the vertebrae of the tail in many vertebrates. In birds, the last few caudal vertebrae fuse into the pygostyle, and in apes, including humans, the caudal vertebrae are fused into the coccyx.

In many reptiles, some of the caudal vertebrae bear ribs, the caudal ribs, though these are often fused with the vertebrae.

The caudal vertebrae often articulate with haemal arches ventrally.

The number of caudal vertebrae in animals can vary greatly. Anguid lizards have been reported to have as many as 111 caudal vertebrae, whereas, as few as seven are present in the tail of the early therapsid Tapinocaninus.

In lepidosaurs and captorhinids, the caudal vertebrae possess fracture planes at mid-length that allow caudal autotomy.

In frogs, the few caudal vertebrae are fused together to form part of the urostyle.
