= Groebertherium =

Groebertherium Temporal range: Late Santonian-Maastrichtian ~84–66 Ma

Scientific classification
- Kingdom: Animalia
- Phylum: Chordata
- Class: Mammalia
- Clade: Cladotheria
- Superorder: †Dryolestoidea
- Order: †Dryolestida
- Genus: †Groebertherium; Bonaparte, 1986

Species
- †G. allenensis Rougier et al., 2009; †G. stipanicici Bonaparte, 1986 (Type); †G. novasi Bonaparte, 1986

Synonyms
- Alamitherium Bonaparte, 2002; Barberenia Bonaparte, 1990; Brandonia Bonaparte, 1990

Extinct family of mammals

Groebertherium is a genus of dryolestoid mammal from the Late Cretaceous Los Alamitos and Allen Formations of Argentina. It is not closely related to other contemporary dryolestoids, all of which are part of the clade Meridiolestida.

== Classification ==
Groebertherium has been consistently recovered as a dryolestoid within Dryolestida and outside of Meridiolestida, though its exact positioning varies among several studies. Rougier et al. 2011, for example, recovers it as a member of Dryolestidae, rendering it a relictual survivor of this clade with a gap of 40 million years in relation to the youngest northern dryolestids, while Harper et al. 2018 recovers it as slightly closer to Meridiolestida than to northern dryolestoids.

== Palaeobiology ==
Unlike meridiolestidans, it retains a parastylar hook on its molariform teeth. Therefore, it was likely less specialised to transverse (side-to-side) mastication. It was rather similar to Dryolestes, indicating a similar tenrec or hedgehog-like lifestyle.
