= Paratheria (mammals) =

Former taxonomic group including xenarthran and similar mammals

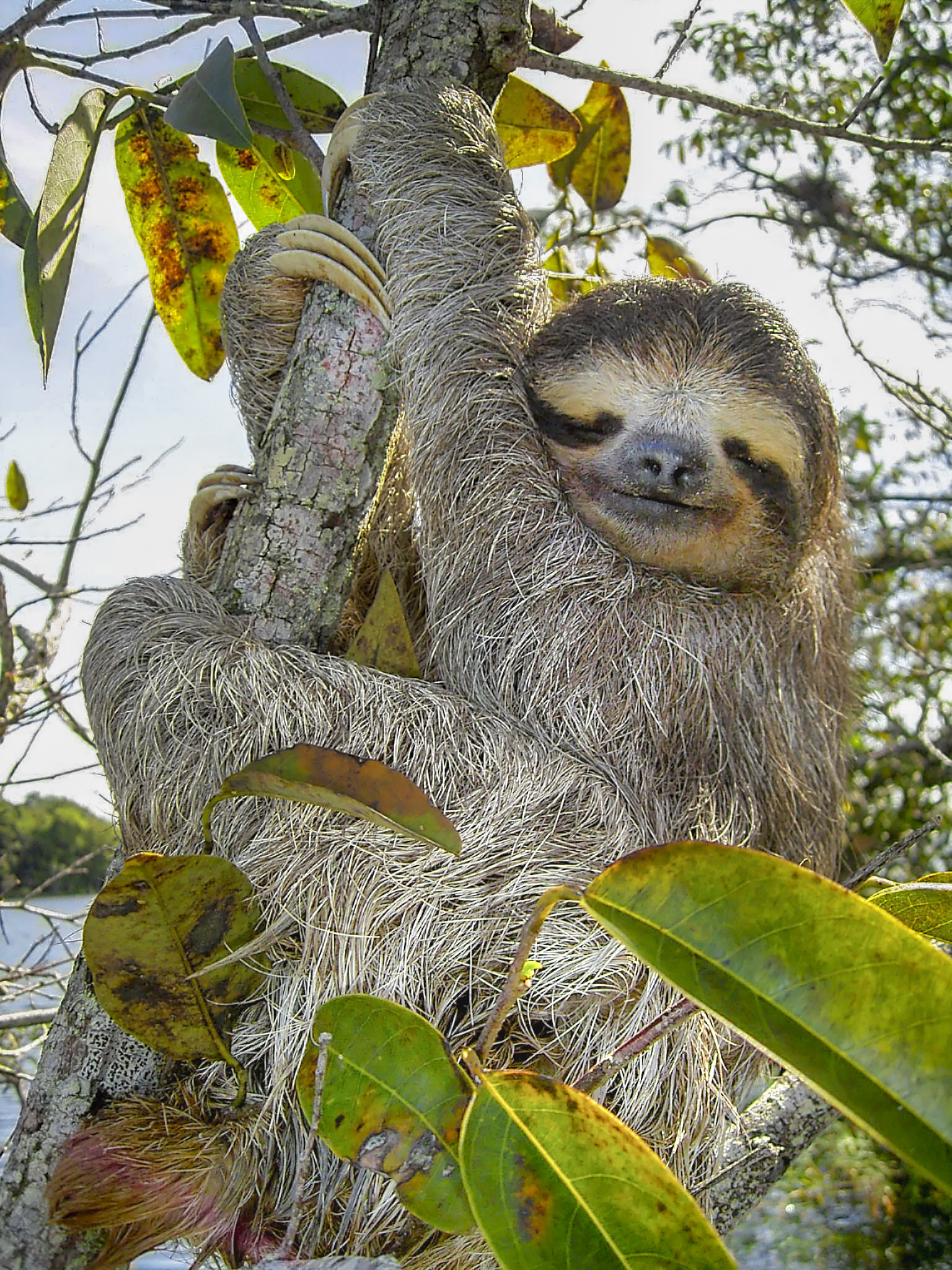
The term "Paratheria" was proposed as a result of the hypothesis that edentates, such as this brown-throated sloth (Bradypus variegatus), are distinct from other placental mammals.

Paratheria is an obsolete term for a taxonomic group including the xenarthran mammals (sloths, anteaters, and armadillos) and various groups thought to be related to them. It was proposed by Oldfield Thomas in 1887 to set apart the sloths, anteaters, armadillos, and pangolins, usually classified as placentals, from both marsupial and placental mammals, an arrangement that received little support from other workers. When teeth of the extinct gondwanathere mammals were first discovered in Argentina in the 1980s, they were thought to be related to xenarthrans, leading to renewed attention for the hypothesis that xenarthrans are not placentals. However, by the early 1990s, gondwanatheres were shown to be unrelated to xenarthrans, and xenarthrans are still considered to be placentals.

== History ==
The term "Paratheria" was coined by British mammalogist Oldfield Thomas in 1887 in a review of tooth development in mammals. He found that the "Edentata" were especially distinctive. In this group, he included the sloths, anteaters, and armadillos, which are still placed together as Xenarthra, as well as the pangolins and the aardvark. According to Thomas, edentate teeth would be derived from the very earliest stage of mammalian dental evolution. Consequently, he suggested that they should be given a grouping separate from the other major groupings of mammals, for which terms had been introduced by Thomas Huxley: Eutheria (placentals) and Metatheria (marsupials). For this new grouping, he suggested the name Paratheria "to indicate their position by the side of, but separate from, the other Mammals" (the Greek παρά para means "beside"). Thomas had included one other mammal among the edentates, the aardvark; however, he was unable to provide a satisfactory scenario for the origin of its wholly unique dentition, which he could only compare with that of some fish. Thomas's arrangement was foreshadowed by Henri Marie Ducrotay de Blainville's 1839 classification; he placed edentates (except the sloth Bradypus, which he considered to be a primate) as a major division, the Maldentés ("poorly toothed"). This group was considered to be distinct from the other monodelphes (placentals), the Bien dentés ("well-toothed"). Similarly, Paul Gervais proposed in 1855 that edentates should be placed in a separate subclass of mammals.

Thomas's hypothesis received little support, or even attention, in subsequent years. In 1893, Henry Fairfield Osborn remarked that new studies of edentate teeth indicated that they were not as distinct as Thomas thought. William Berryman Scott did, however, place Paratheria as a separate subclass in 1904, although he apparently did not follow Thomas's theories about the origins of edentate teeth. In 1910, William King Gregory reviewed the interrelationships of mammals and placed edentates among other placentals, though he gave "Paratheria" as an alternative name for his superorder Edentata, which included Xenarthra and tentatively Pholidota (pangolins), Tubulidentata (aardvarks), and the fossil Taeniodonta. In 1976, Eli Minkoff also used "Paratheria" for a placental superorder that included Edentata (for the sloths, armadillos, and anteaters) and Pholidota.

The Paratheria hypothesis enjoyed a brief renaissance when unusual, high-crowned teeth began turning up in the Cretaceous and Paleocene fossil record of Argentina. In 1984, Sudamerica ameghinoi, from the Paleocene of Argentina, was assigned to Xenarthra within Paratheria, ranked as a cohort (a taxonomic rank between infraclass and superorder). Two years later, José Bonaparte named Gondwanatherium patagonicum from the Late Cretaceous of Argentina, which he thought to be related to Sudamerica, and tentatively assigned it to Paratheria, now ranked as an infraclass. Bonaparte described an additional related animal, Vucetichia gracilis, from the Argentinean Late Cretaceous in 1990; by then he classified it in the order Gondwanatheria, which was tentatively assigned to the infraclass Paratheria. Bonaparte argued against George Gaylord Simpson's 1931 view that xenarthrans derive from the Tertiary Palaeanodonta of North America, and instead suggested that xenarthrans, and perhaps pangolins, split from eutherians (placentals and their extinct relatives) as early as the Early Cretaceous and derived from some early "pantothere" (a now-abandoned grouping of early mammals, including dryolestoids among others).

However, Bonaparte himself had abandoned the proposed relationship between xenarthrans and gondwanatherians by 1993. Instead, gondwanatherians were shown to be related to another Late Cretaceous Argentinean animal, Ferugliotherium (which turned out to be undistinguishable from Vucetichia), and through it to multituberculates. The relation between multituberculates and gondwanatheres later became controversial, but they are no longer thought to be related to xenarthrans. By 1996, "few if any systematists would ... doubt the eutherian affinities of xenarthrans" and molecular data have also supported the placement of Xenarthra within placentals as one of four major clades. The name "Paratheria" is no longer in use.
