= Enamel prism =

Dental enamel

An enamel prism, or enamel rod, is the basic unit of tooth enamel. Measuring 3-6 μm in diameter in primates, enamel prisms are tightly packed hydroxyapatite crystal structures. The hydroxyapatite crystals are hexagonal in shape, providing rigidity to the prism and strengthening the enamel. In cross-section, it is best compared to a complex "keyhole" or a "fish-like" shape. The head, which is called the prism core, is oriented toward the tooth's crown; The tail, which is called the prism sheath, is oriented toward the tooth cervical margin. The prism core has tightly packed hydroxyapatite crystals. On the other hand, the prism sheath has its crystals less tightly packed and has more space for organic components. These prism structures can usually be visualised within ground sections and/or with the use of a scanning electron microscope on enamel that has been acid etched.

The number of enamel prisms range approximately from 5 million to 12 million in the number between mandibular incisors and maxillary molars.

Enamel prism are found in rows along the tooth. Within each row, the enamel prism's long axis is generally perpendicular to the underlying ADJ amelo-dentinal junction, which is also called the dentino-enamel junction. Such is the case in both permanent and primary dentitions; the enamel prisms following the path of the ameloblasts. In permanent teeth, the enamel prisms near the cemento-enamel junction (CEJ) tilt slightly more apically toward the root of the tooth. Knowing the orientation of enamel is very important in restorative dentistry because enamel unsupported by underlying dentin is prone to fracture and usually is avoided.

The arrangement of crystals within each enamel prism is highly complex. For the most part, the enamel crystals are oriented parallel to the long axis of the prism. The further away the crystals are from the central axis, the more their own orientation diverges.

Within ground sections of teeth, prisms appear to be twisted and interwoven around each other at the cusps. Such allows teeth to be able to resist strong masticatory forces without fracturing, with literature showing teeth being able to resist forces up to 20-30 pounds per tooth. This part of the enamel is called Gnarled enamel.

The area around the enamel prism is known as interrod enamel. Interrod enamel has the same composition as the enamel prisms. Nonetheless, a histologic distinction is made between the two because crystal orientation is different in each. The crystals lie nearly perpendicular to the enamel prism.
