= Los Alamitos Formation =

Geological formation in Argentina

- Stratigraphic range: Late Campanian-Maastrichtian; ~85–66 Ma
- Type: Geological formation
- Sub-units: Coli Toro Member

Lithology
- Primary: Siltstone
- Other: Sandstone

Location
- Coordinates: 42.1°S 66.3°W
- Approximate paleocoordinates: 45.0°S 52.3°W
- Region: Río Negro Province
- Country: Argentina
- Extent: North Patagonian Massif
- Los Alamitos Formation (Argentina)

The Los Alamitos Formation is a geological formation of the North Patagonian Massif in Rio Negro Province, northwestern Patagonia, Argentina, whose strata date back to the Late Cretaceous (Late Campanian to Maastrichtian). Dinosaur remains are among the fossils that have been recovered from the formation.

== Fossil content ==
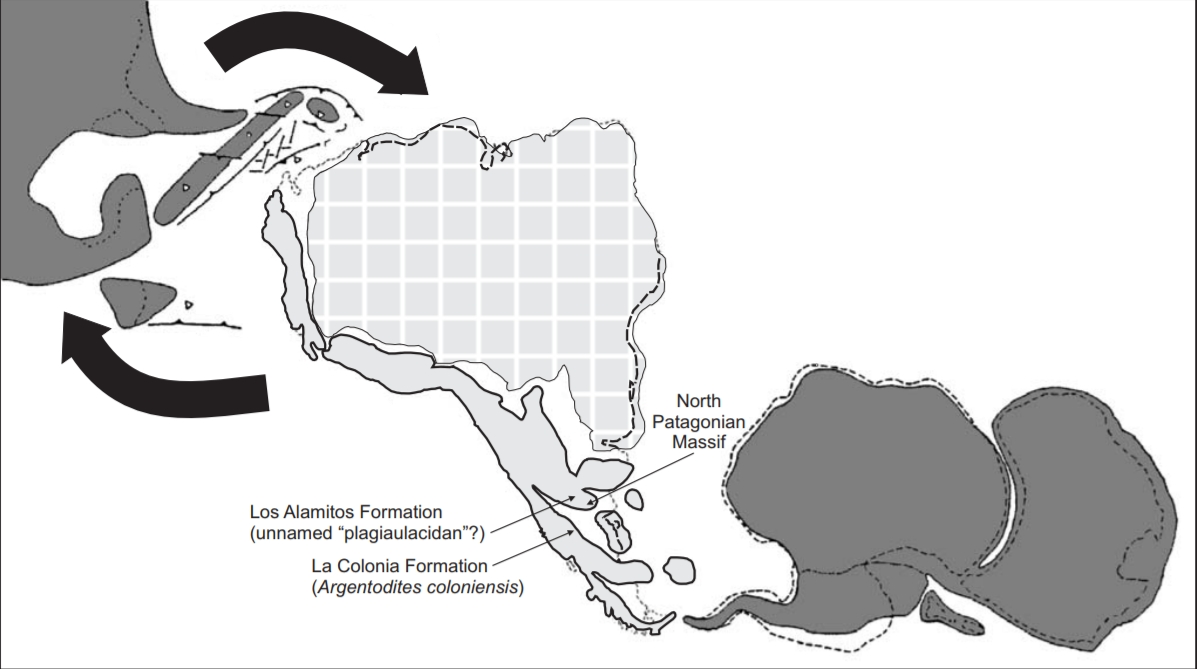
Paleogeography of the Late Cretaceous with Los Alamitos Formation indicated

=== Dinosaurs ===
Genus	Species	Material	Notes	Images
Aeolosaurus	A. rionegrinus		A titanosaur.	
Alamitornis	A. minutus		An ornithuromorph.	
Huallasaurus	H. australis	"Partial skulls with associated postcrania, approximately [five] individuals."	A hadrosaur formally named "Kritosaurus" australis.	
cf. Hesperornithes				
Indeterminate theropod				
Indeterminate ornithurine				
Indeterminate avian				

=== Rhynchocephalians ===
Genus	Species	Material	Notes	Images
Alamitosphenos	A. mineri			
Kawasphenodon	K. expectatus			

=== Snakes ===
Genus	Species	Material	Notes	Imaes
Alamitophis	A. argentinus			

=== Turtles ===
Genus	Species	Material	Notes	Images
Patagoniaemys	P. aeschyli			

=== Mammaliaforms ===
Genus	Species	Material	Notes	Images
Alamitherium	A. bishopi			
Austrotriconodon	A. sepulvedai			
Austrotriconodon	A. mckennai			
Leonardus	L. cuspidatus			
Bondesius	B. ferox			
Brandonia	B. intermedia			
Casamiquelia	C. rionegrina			
Ferugliotherium	F. windhauseni			
Gondwanatherium	G. patagonicum			
Groebertherium	G. novasi			
Mesungulatum	M. houssayi			
Paraungulatum	P. rectangularis			
Reigitherium	R. bunodontum			
Rougiertherium	R. tricuspes			

== See also ==
- List of dinosaur-bearing rock formations
