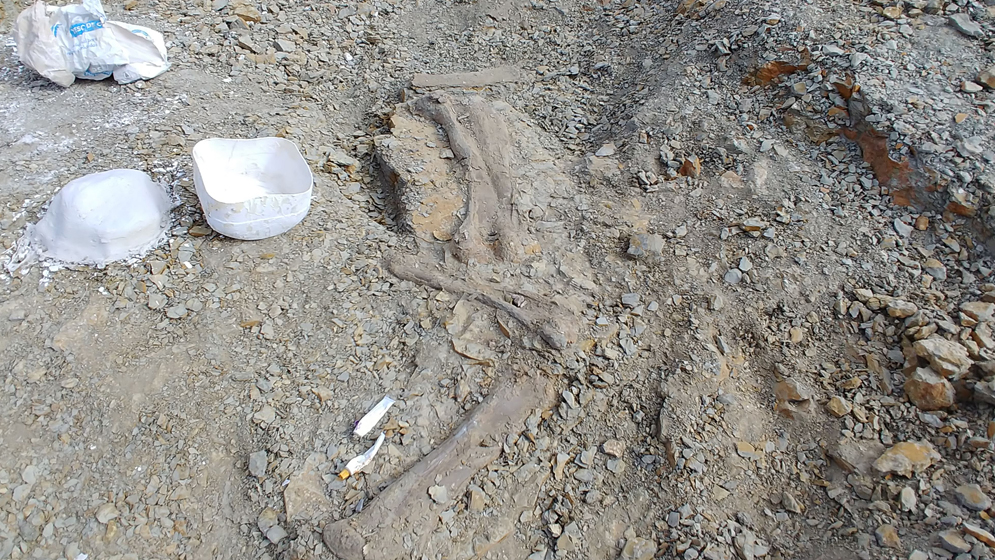
- In situ holotype of T. gimenezi

Scientific classification
- Kingdom: Animalia
- Phylum: Chordata
- Class: Reptilia
- Clade: Dinosauria
- Clade: Saurischia
- Clade: †Sauropodomorpha
- Clade: †Sauropoda
- Clade: †Eusauropoda
- Clade: †Macronaria
- Clade: †Titanosauria
- Genus: †Titanomachya; Pérez-Moreno et al., 2024
- Species: †T. gimenezi

Binomial name
- †Titanomachya gimenezi Pérez-Moreno et al., 2024

= Titanomachya =

Titanomachya Temporal range: Late Cretaceous, Maastrichtian

Extinct genus of sauropod dinosaurs

Titanomachya (named after the Titanomachy of Greek mythology) is an extinct genus of titanosaurian sauropod dinosaur from the Late Cretaceous La Colonia Formation of Argentina. The genus contains a single species, Titanomachya gimenezi. It is a relatively small titanosaur, weighing around 7.8 tonnes (8.6 short tons).

== Discovery and naming ==
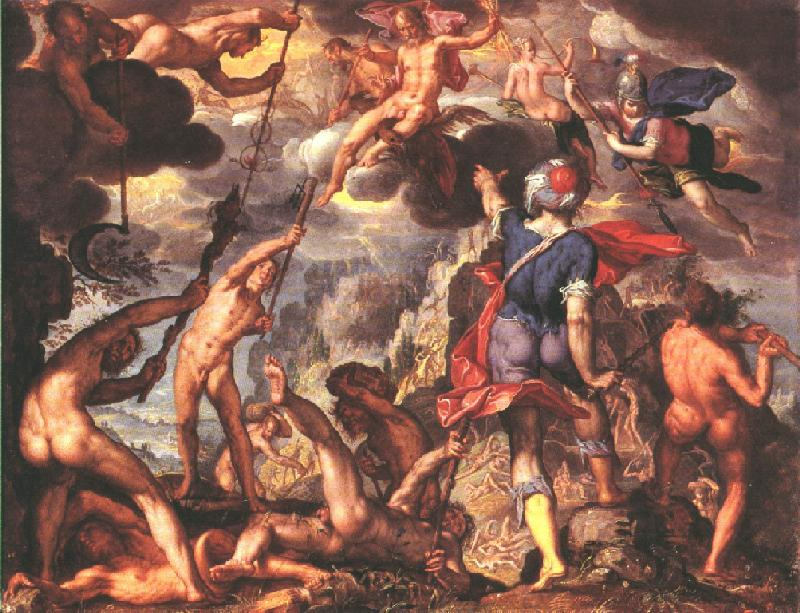
Artistic representation of the Titanomachy, after which Titanomachya was named, by Joachim Wtewael

The Titanomachya holotype specimen, MPEF Pv 11547, was discovered in sediments of the La Colonia Formation near the Cerro Bayo mountain and Bajada del Diablo crater in Chubut Province of Patagonia, Argentina. The specimen consists of an incomplete, partially articulated skeleton, including a caudal vertebra, several fragmentary ribs, two haemal arches, the left humerus, fragments of the pelvic girdle, part of both femora, both tibiae and fibulae, and parts of both astragali.

In 2024, Pérez-Moreno et al. described Titanomachya gimenezi as a new genus and species of titanosaurian sauropod based on these fossil remains. Two partial caudal vertebrae belonging to saltasauroid titanosaurs are also known from the formation, but were not referred to Titanomachya. The generic name, Titanomachya, alludes to the mythological Greek Titanomachy—the battle where the Olympian gods fought and defeated the Titans—referring to the species' proximity to the extinction of the titanosaurs. The specific name, gimenezi, honors Olga Giménez and her paleontological contributions to the study of Argentinian dinosaurs from Chubut Province.

Titanomachya represents the first saltasauroid titanosaur to be discovered in Central Patagonian sediments dated to the end of the Cretaceous. The only other saltasauroid from the North Patagonian Massif is the similarly aged Dreadnoughtus from Argentina's Cerro Fortaleza Formation.

== Description ==
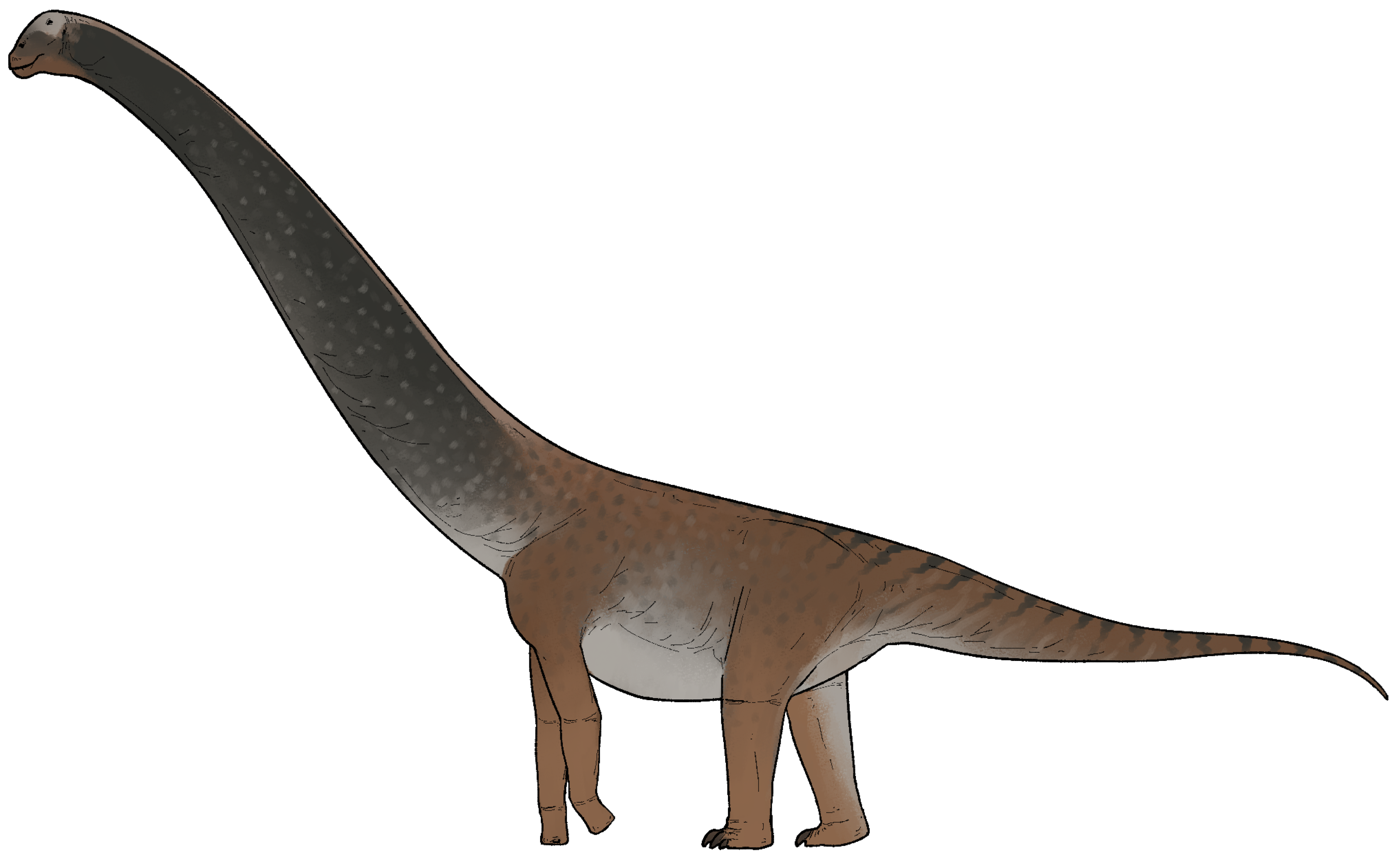
Speculative life restoration

Titanomachya is a small titanosaur, with an estimated length of 6 metres (20 ft). It probably weighed between 5.8 and 9.8 tonnes (6.4 and 10.8 short tons), with a mean body mass of 7.8 tonnes (8.6 short tons). The holotype specimen was an adult similar in size to some related saltasaurids (Neuquensaurus and Saltasaurus), but it may have weighed more, as indicated by an astragalus modified for improved weight-bearing. The morphology of the astragalus is intermediate between colossosaurs and saltasauroids.

== Classification ==
Pérez-Moreno et al. (2024) entered Titanomachya into a phylogenetic analysis and found it to be in the clade Lithostrotia, itself recovered as a subclade of the Saltasauroidea. This result is similar to that recovered in the 2023 description of Bustingorrytitan. The results of Pérez-Moreno et al. are shown in the cladogram below:

- Eutitanosauria
  - Colossosauria
  - Saltasauroidea
    - Dreadnoughtus
    - Lithostrotia
      - Malawisaurus
      - - Tapuiasaurus
        - Alamosaurus
        - - Rapetosaurus
          - Opisthocoelicaudia
          - Titanomachya
          - - Saltasaurus
            - Neuquensaurus

== Paleoenvironment ==
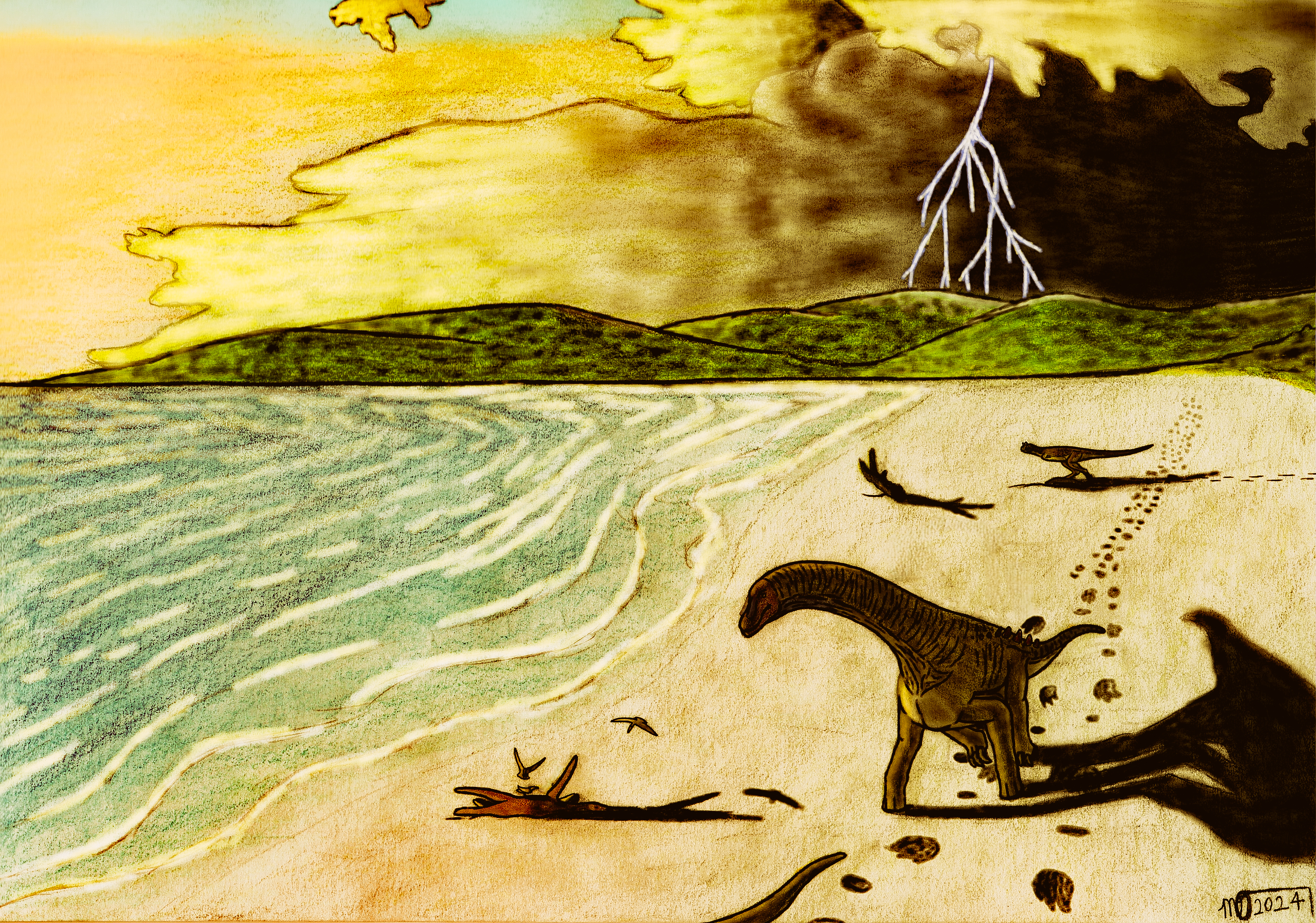
Restoration of Titanomachya in its environment

Titanomachya was found in outcrops of the La Colonia Formation, which dates to the Maastrichtian (Cretaceous)–Paleocene (Paleogene) boundary. This formation is best known for fossils of the abelisaurid theropods Carnotaurus and Koleken, as well as fossils of other reptiles including the turtle Patagoniaemys, the snake Alamitophis and the plesiosaurs Kawanectes, Chubutinectes and Sulcusuchus. Mammals discovered from the formation include Reigitherium, Coloniatherium, Argentodites and Ferugliotherium. Remains of an enantiornithine and, possibly, of a neornithine bird have been discovered. While Titanomachya represents the first herbivorous dinosaur named from this locality, remains of indeterminate hadrosaurs and ankylosaurs have also been found. The small adult size of Titanomachya compared to giant titanosaurs may have been a result of competition with an increased diversity of these other herbivores.
