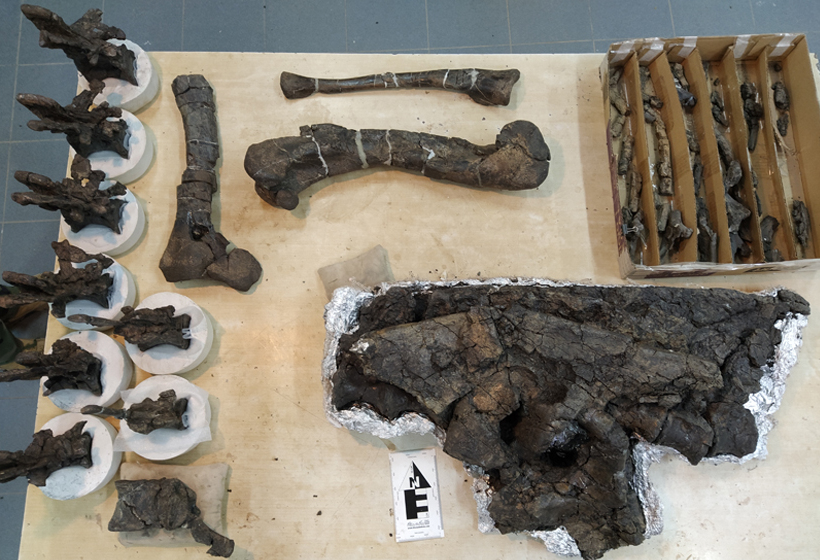
- Holotype of K. inakayali

Scientific classification
- Kingdom: Animalia
- Phylum: Chordata
- Class: Reptilia
- Clade: Dinosauria
- Clade: Saurischia
- Clade: Theropoda
- Family: †Abelisauridae
- Clade: †Brachyrostra
- Clade: †Furileusauria
- Tribe: †Carnotaurini
- Genus: †Koleken; Pol et al., 2024
- Species: †K. inakayali

Binomial name
- †Koleken inakayali Pol et al., 2024

= Koleken =

Koleken Temporal range: Late Cretaceous, Maastrichtian

Genus of abelisaurid theropod

Koleken (meaning "coming from clay and water") is a genus of carnotaurin abelisaurid from the Maastrichtian La Colonia Formation in the Chubut Province of Argentina. The genus contains a single species, Koleken inakayali, known from one immature specimen about 4.97 metres (16.3 ft) long and six years old in minimum age.

== Discovery and naming ==
Koleken is known from only the holotype MPEF-PV 10826 which was initially found and reported in 2015, but was not described as K. inakayali until 2024. The holotype consists of "closely associated (but disarticulated) remains of the skull and atlas, as well as the articulated postcranial skeleton composed of the posteriormost eight dorsal vertebrae, a complete sacrum, eight caudal vertebrae, an almost complete pelvis and hind limbs". It differs from the larger Carnotaurus in anatomical characteristics found in the skull, vertebrae, and leg bones. The specimen is likewise believed to represent a sub-adult based on a lack of fusion in some of the bones.

The generic name, Koleken, is a name in Teushen spoken by the native population of central Patagonia that means "coming from clay and water", given the specimen was found in a sedimentary section dominated by claystone representing an estuarine environment. The specific name, inakayali, honours Inakayal, one of the last chiefs of Tehuelches, native people from central Patagonia.

== Classification ==
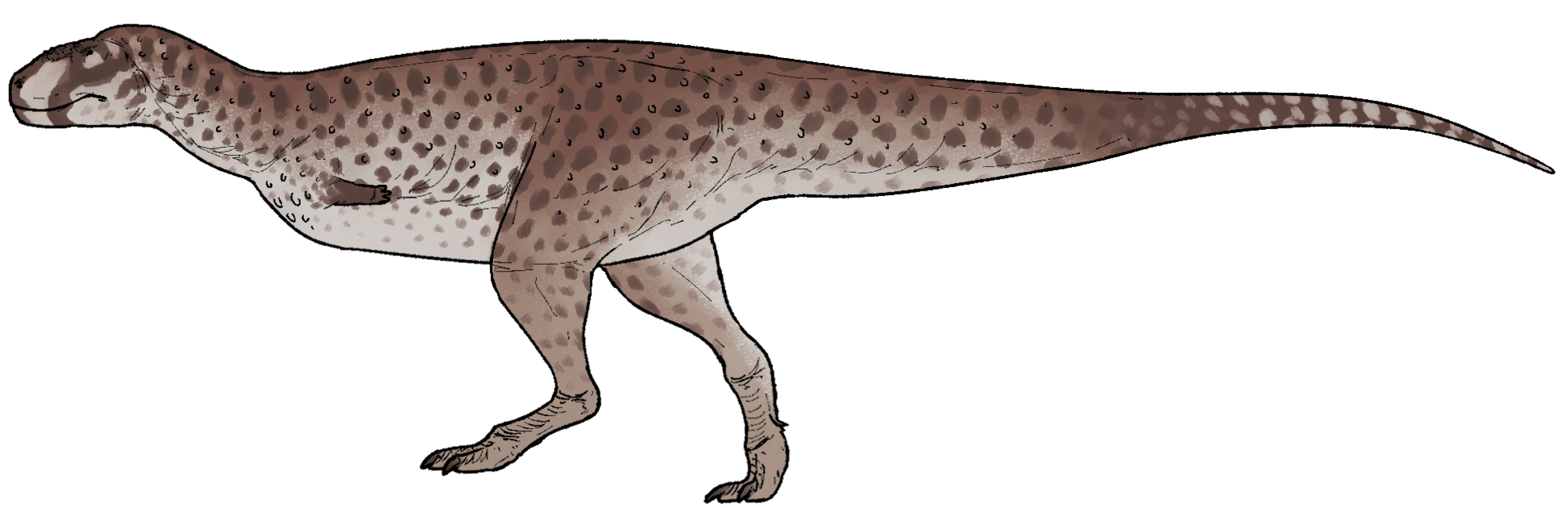
Speculative life restoration

Koleken is placed in the Carnotaurini tribe of Abelisauridae, in a polytomy with the other carnotaurins in a phylogenetic analysis:

- Abelisauridae
  - - Xenotarsosaurus
    - Eoabelisaurus
  - - Spectrovenator
    - - Rugops
      - - "Majungasaurinae"
        - - Brachyrostra
            - Arcovenator
            - - - Ekrixinatosaurus
                - Ilokelesia
              - - Skorpiovenator
                - Furileusauria
                  - Llukalkan
                  - - Viavenator
                    - Carnotaurini
                      - Koleken
                      - Niebla
                      - Carnotaurus
                      - Aucasaurus

== Paleoenvironment ==
Koleken was found in outcrops of the La Colonia Formation, which dates to the Maastrichtian (Cretaceous)–Paleocene (Paleogene) boundary. This formation is best known for fossils of the abelisaurid theropod Carnotaurus and the saltasauroid titanosaur Titanomachya, as well as fossils of other reptiles including the turtle Patagoniaemys, the snake Alamitophis and the plesiosaurs Kawanectes, Chubutinectes and Sulcusuchus. Mammals discovered from the formation include Reigitherium, Coloniatherium, Argentodites and Ferugliotherium. Remains of an enantiornithine and, possibly, of a neornithine bird have been discovered.
