= La Colonia Formation =

Geological formation in Argentina

- Stratigraphic range: Maastrichtian-Danian; ~69–64 Ma
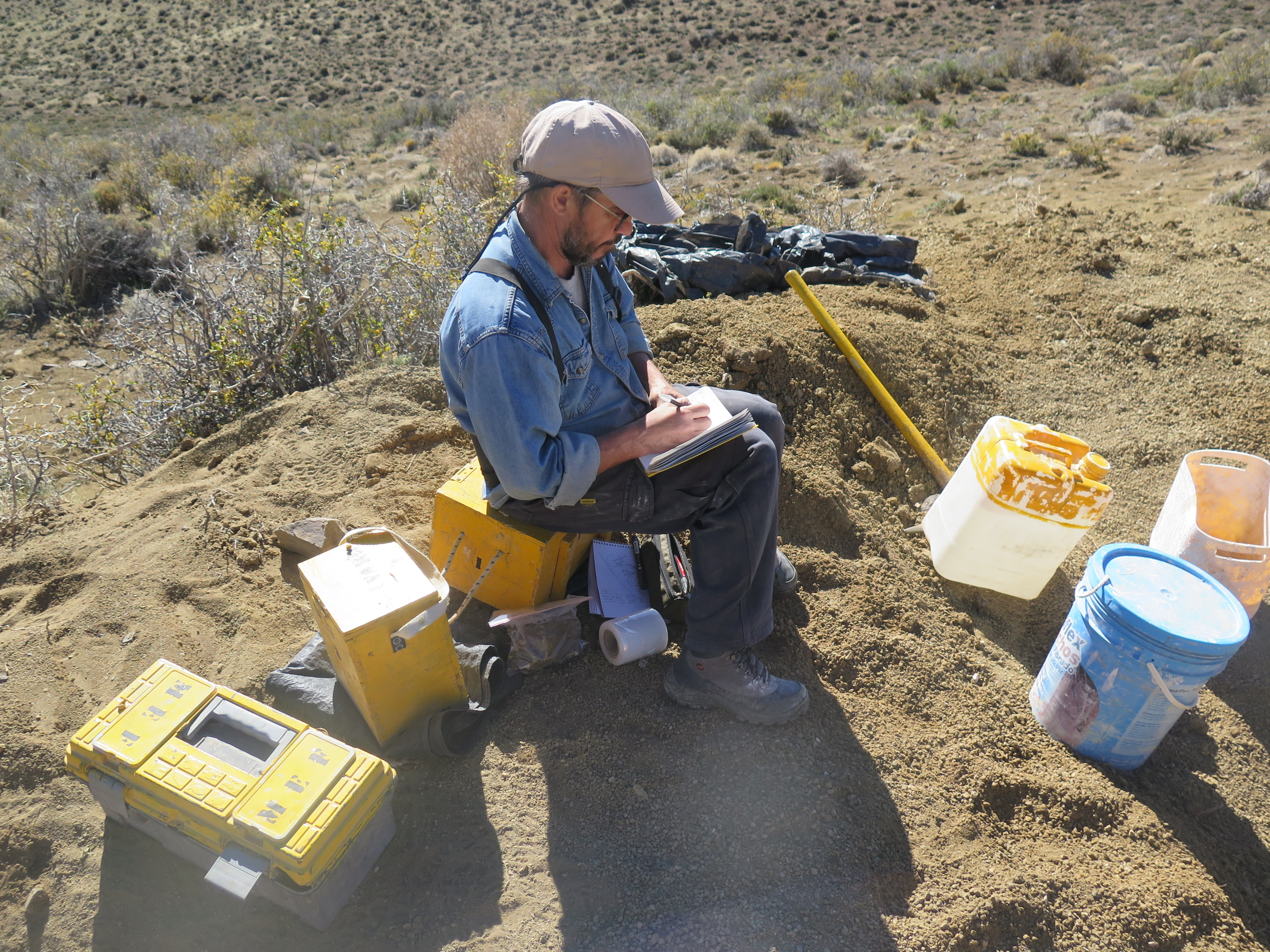
- Outcrop of the La Colonia Formation on the Somún Curá plateau (type locality of Chubutinectes), photographed in 2009.
- Type: Geological formation
- Sub-units: Lower, Middle and Upper members
- Underlies: El Buitre & Sarmiento Formations
- Overlies: Cerro Barcino & Paso del Sapo Formations
- Thickness: Up to 210–240 m (690–790 ft); Thinning to 17 m (56 ft) around Telsen

Lithology
- Primary: Siltstone
- Other: Sandstone, claystone, conglomerate

Location
- Coordinates: 43.0°S 67.5°W
- Approximate paleocoordinates: 45.7°S 53.8°W
- Region: Chubut Province
- Country: Argentina
- Extent: Cañadón Asfalto Basin

Type section
- Named for: Sierra La Colonia
- La Colonia Formation (Argentina)

The La Colonia Formation is a geological formation in Argentina whose strata date back to the Late Cretaceous. Dinosaur remains are among the fossils that have been recovered from the formation.

Originally thought to be Campanian (c.73-72 million years ago) in age or earlier, studies of underlying formations have made a Maastrichtian (72–66 million years ago) age more likely. A further study in 2021 utilizing magnetostratigraphy and palynological data provided an age of 69 to 64 million years ago.

== Description ==
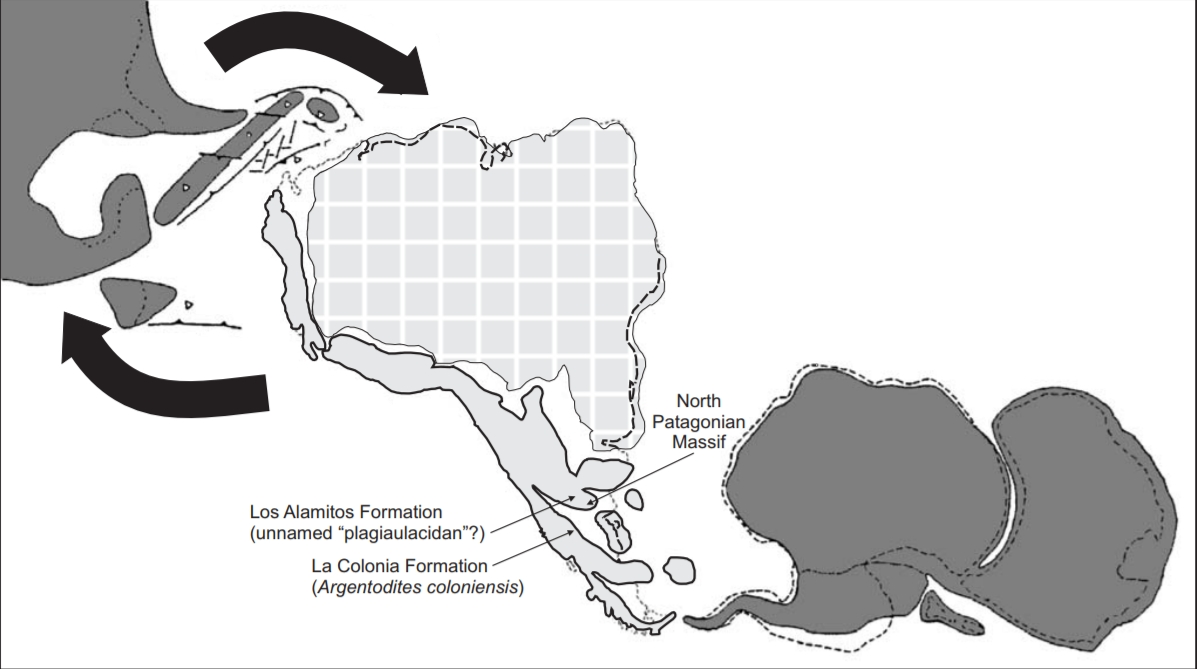
Paleogeography of the Late Cretaceous with La Colonia Formation indicated

It is divided up into three distinct facies, the first is up to 16 metres (52 ft) thick and consists of conglomerate, the second is by far the thickest at over 100 metres (330 ft), consists of siltstone and claystone, with interbeds of claystone/shale and sandstone, the third is less than 10 metres (33 ft) thick and consists of clay, and probably represents a nearshore marine environment.

The paleoflora was known for its aquatic components, Paleoazolla and Regnellidium. However, recent paleobotanical discoveries at the Cañadón del Irupé locality have revealed the presence of a more diverse range of plants associated with these water bodies, including pteridophytes, gymnosperms, and various angiosperms. Among these are fossil leaves and fruits assignable to Nelumbonaceae.

During the Maastrichtian, Patagonia was flooded by the Transgression of the Kawas Sea. This would have likely rendered much of Patagonia, including the region represented by what is now the La Colonia Formation, scattered faunal Islands.

== Fossil content ==
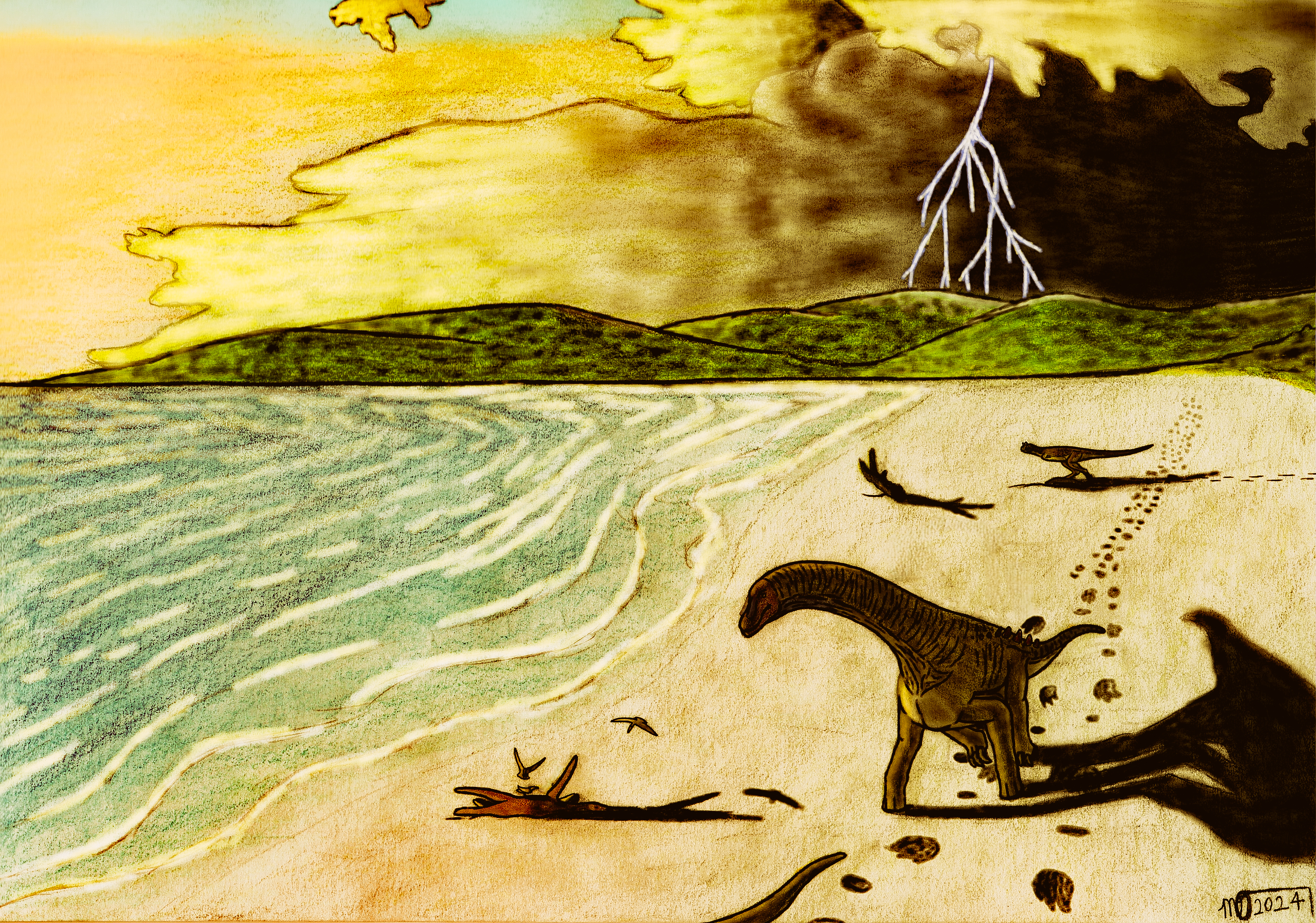
Speculative restoration of a La Colonia Formation environment

Color key: Taxon / Reclassified taxon / Taxon falsely reported as present / Dubious taxon or junior synonym / Ichnotaxon / Ootaxon / Morphotaxon

Notes
Uncertain or tentative taxa are in small text
~~crossed out~~ taxa are discredited.

=== Turtles ===
Turtles from the La Colonia Formation
Genus	Species	Location	Stratigraphic position	Material	Notes	Images
Calvarichelys	C. coloniensis	Norte de Cerro Bayo 2	Middle levels	Skull and lower jaw; postcranial remains	A chelid	
Patagoniaemys	P. gasparinae	Buitre Chico; in and around Norte de Cerro Bayo 2; Cerro Bosta		Skull fragments and several postcranial elements, including a nearly complete vertebral column	A meiolaniform	
Yaminuechelys	aff.Y. gasparinii	Norte de Cerro Bayo 1; Norte de Cerro Bayo 2; Cerro Bosta		Three specimens restricted to postcranial remains (mainly shell fragments)		
Yaminuechelys	Y. sulcipeculiaris	Norte de Cerro Bayo 1; Norte de Cerro Bayo 2; Cerro Bosta		Three specimens restricted to postcranial remains (mainly shell fragments)		

=== Fish ===
Fish from the La Colonia Formation
Genus	Species	Location	Stratigraphic position	Material	Notes	Images
Metaceratodus	M. baibianorum	Norte de Cerro Bayo 1			A ceratodontid lungfish	

=== Plesiosaurs ===
Plesiosaurs from the La Colonia Formation
Genus	Species	Location	Stratigraphic position	Material	Notes	Images
Chubutinectes	C. carmeloi			Several vertebrae, ribs, partial pectoral and pelvic girdles, arm and leg bones, and gastroliths	An elasmosaurid	
Elasmosauridae indet.	Indeterminate	Norte de Cerro Bayo 1; Cerro Bosta		Three postcranial specimens that preserve cervical, dorsal, and caudal vertebrae, ribs, gastroliths, and three vertebrae without collection numbers.		
Kawanectes	K. lafquenianum			An incomplete mandible, nine cervical vertebrae, 14 dorsal vertebrae, three sacral vertebrae, and five caudal vertebrae, and almost complete left fore limb, the isolated right humerus, both femora, ilia, pubes, and the right ischium.	An elasmosaurid	
Sulcusuchus	S. erraini	Cerro Bosta		Part of the skull and mandible	A polycotylid	

=== Dinosaurs ===
==== Ornithischians ====
Ornithischians from the La Colonia Formation
Genus	Species	Location	Stratigraphic position	Material	Notes	Images
Ankylosauria indet.	Indeterminate	Norte de Cerro Bayo 2		An osteoderm		
Unnamed Parankylosauria	Unnamed			Multiple specimens including cranial and postcranial remains, representing much of the complete skeleton	An unnamed and undescribed parankylosaur with a 'cudgel-like' tail weapon distinct from that of Stegouros	
Hadrosauroidea indet.	Indeterminate	Norte de Cerro Bayo 2		Metatarsal fragment and two vertebral fragments		
Unnamed Hadrosauridae	Unnamed			An articulated skeleton with a complete skull	An unnamed and undescribed hadrosaurid related to other South American kritosaurins, representing the most complete hadrosaur from the continent	

==== Sauropods ====
Sauropods from the La Colonia Formation
Genus	Species	Location	Stratigraphic position	Material	Notes	Images
Somphospondyli indet.	Indeterminate	Norte de Cerro Bayo 2		"Two fragmentary caudal vertebrae"		
Titanomachya	T. gimenezi	Norte de Cerro Bayo 2		"Partial postcranial skeleton"	A saltasauroid titanosaur sauropod with possible affinities to the Saltasaurinae	

==== Theropods ====
Theropods from the La Colonia Formation
Genus	Species	Location	Stratigraphic position	Material	Notes	Images
Carnotaurus	C. sastrei	Pocho Sastre		Nearly complete skeleton and skull	An abelisaurid	
Enantiornithes indet.	Indeterminate			A distal humerus		
Koleken	K. inakayali	Norte de Cerro Bayo 1		Much of a partially articulated skeleton	An abelisaurid.	
Neornithes indet.	Indeterminate			A distal ulna	Similar to Anseriformes	
Theropoda indet.	Indeterminate	Norte de Cerro Bayo 2		Metatarsal fragments of a single individual		

=== Mammals ===
Over 300 mammal specimens have been found in the La Colonia Formation.

Mammals of the La Colonia Formation
Genus	Species	Location	Stratigraphic position	Material	Notes	Images
Argentodites	A. coloniensis				A possible gondwanatherian or multituberculate	
Coloniatherium	C. cilinskii				A meridiolestidan	
Ferugliotherium	F. windhauseni				A possible gondwanatherian or multituberculate	
Reigitherium	R. bunodontum				A meridiolestidan	
Notopolytheles	N. joelis				A multituberculate	

=== Snakes ===
Fossils of madtsoiids, and perhaps boids, have been found in the formation.

Snakes from the La Colonia Formation
Genus	Species	Location	Stratigraphic position	Material	Notes	Images
Alamitophis	A. argentinus			Trunk vertebra	A madtsoiid snake	
Eomadtsoia	E. ragei				A madtsoiid Snake	

== See also ==
- List of dinosaur-bearing rock formations
- Allen Formation, Campanian to Maastrichtian fossiliferous formation of the Neuquén Basin
- Angostura Colorada Formation, Campanian to Maastrichtian fossiliferous formation of the North Patagonian Massif
- Colorado Formation, Campanian to Maastrichtian fossiliferous formation of the Colorado Basin
- Lago Colhué Huapí Formation, Campanian to Maastrichtian fossiliferous formation of the Golfo San Jorge Basin
