= Chubutinectes =

Chubutinectes Temporal range: Late Cretaceous (Upper Maastrichtian)

Scientific classification
- Kingdom: Animalia
- Phylum: Chordata
- Class: Reptilia
- Superorder: †Sauropterygia
- Order: †Plesiosauria
- Superfamily: †Plesiosauroidea
- Family: †Elasmosauridae
- Clade: †Weddellonectia
- Genus: †Chubutinectes; O'Gorman et al., 2023
- Species: †C. carmeloi

Binomial name
- †Chubutinectes carmeloi O'Gorman et al., 2023

Genus of elasmosaurid plesiosaurs

Chubutinectes (meaning "Chubut swimmer") is an extinct genus of elasmosaurid plesiosaur from the Late Cretaceous La Colonia Formation of Argentina. The genus contains a single species, C. carmeloi, known from a partial skeleton and associated gastroliths.

== Discovery and naming ==
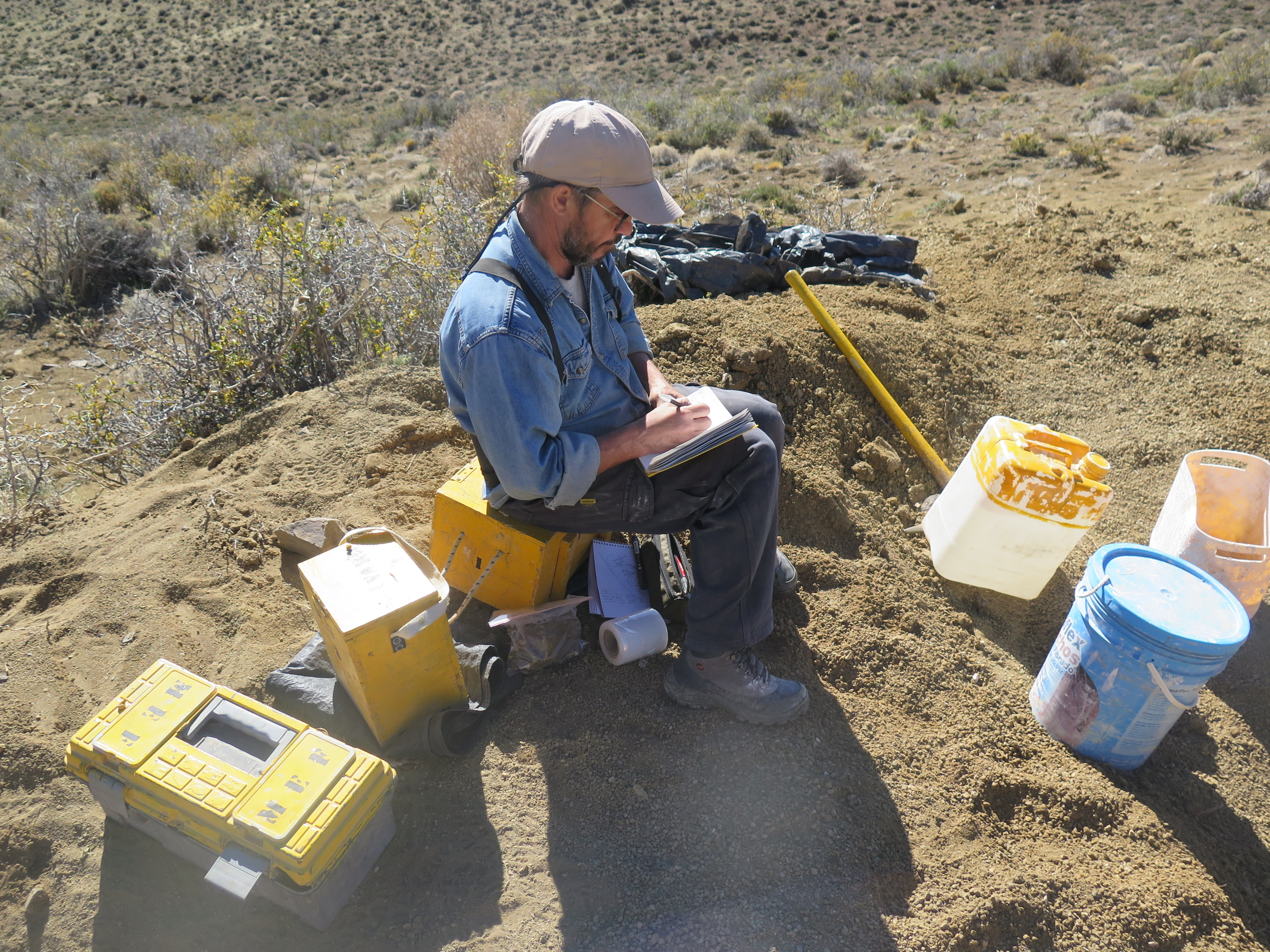
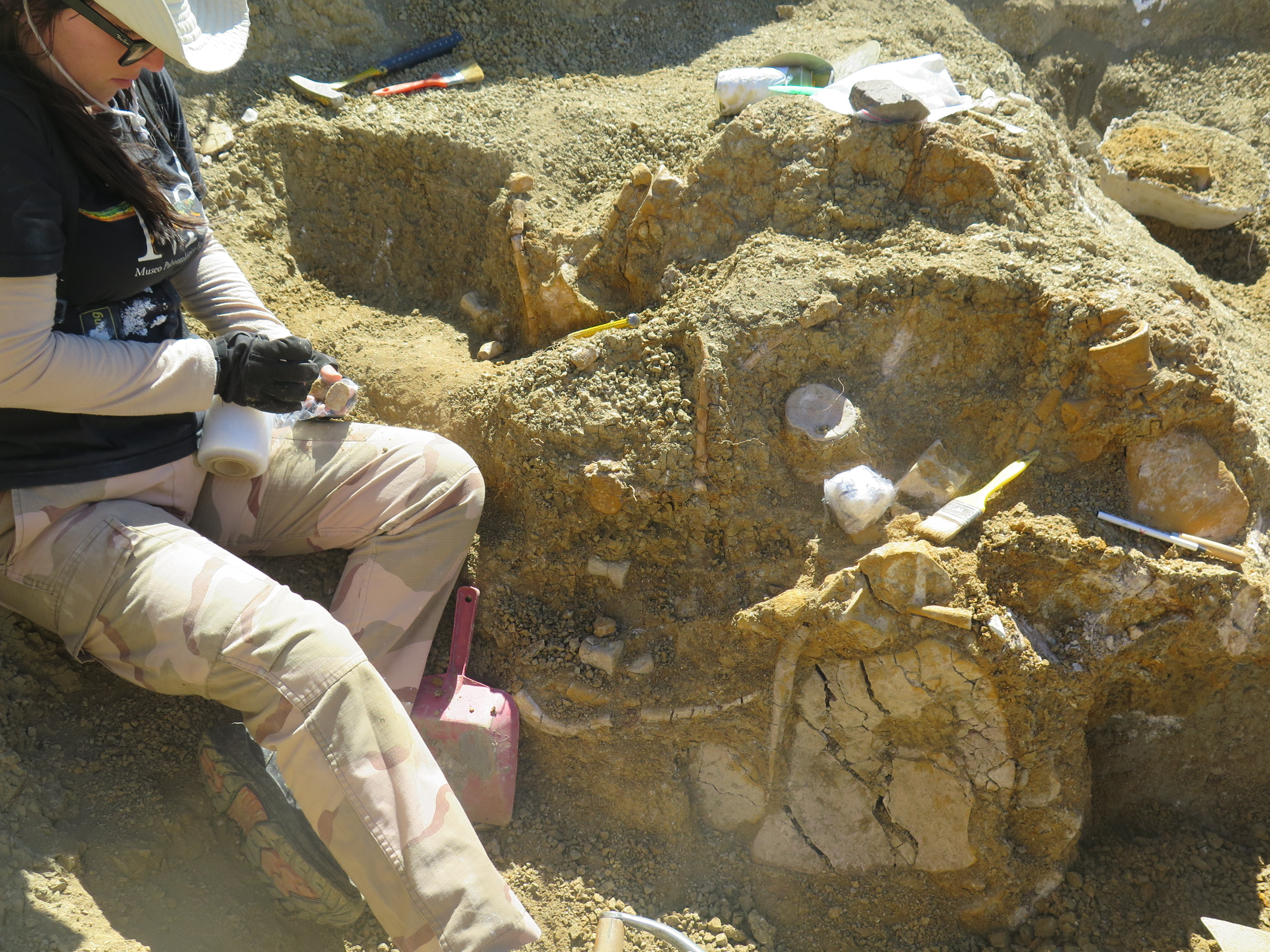
Photographs from the excavation of the Chubutinectes type specimen

The Chubutinectes holotype specimen, MPEF-PV 5232, was discovered in 2009 within sediments of the La Colonia Formation on the Somún Curá plateau in Chubut Province, Argentina. The disarticulated specimen consists of cervical, pectoral, dorsal, sacral, and caudal vertebral centra and neural arches, various ribs, partial pectoral and pelvic girdles, fore- and hind-limb elements, and about 350 gastroliths.

In 2023, O'Gorman and colleagues described Chubutinectes carmeloi as a new genus and species of elasmosaurid plesiosaur based on these fossil remains. The generic name, "Chubutinectes", combines a reference to the Argentinean province "Chubut", where the holotype was found, with the Greek word "nectes", meaning "swimmer". The specific name, "carmeloi", honors Carmelo Muñoz, the discoverer of the holotype.

== Description ==
The holotype of Chubutinectes is an osteologically immature specimen with a dorsal region measuring 1.4 m (4.6 ft) long, indicating that it was larger than an adult Kawanectes from the same formation. This size difference may result from their environmental difference, as Kawanectes lived in estuaries, while Chubutinectes lived in marine habitats.

== Classification ==
In their phylogenetic analyses, O'Gorman et al. (2023) recovered Chubutinectes as a member of the elasmosaurid clade Weddellonectia, as the sister taxon to the clade containing Aphrosaurus and Hydrotherosaurus. Nearly identical results were recovered by O'Keefe et al. (2025) in an updated version of this phylogenetic matrix, the results of which are shown in the cladogram below:

- Weddellonectia
  - Tuarangisaurus
  - - Futabasaurus
    - - - Chubutinectes
        - - Aphrosaurus
          - Hydrotherosaurus
      - - - Morenosaurus
          - - Vegasaurus
            - Kawanectes
        - - Marambionectes
          - Aristonectinae
            ⊞
            - Wunyelfia
            - - MLP 99-XII-1-5
                (Aristonectinae indet.)
              - Aristonectes parvidens
              - Aristonectes quiriquinensis
              - Kaiwhekea
              - - Alexandronectes
                - Morturneria
            ⊟

== Paleoenvironment ==
Chubutinectes was discovered in layers of the La Colonia Formation, which dates to the upper Maastrichtian. Based on the presence of nanofossils of Micula spp., the rock layers are younger than around 67.3 million years old. The fellow elasmosaurid Kawanectes was also found in this formation, as well as the remains of indeterminate elasmosaurids and the polycotylid Sulcusuchus. Dinosaur fossils, including those of the abelisaurid theropods Carnotaurus and Koleken, titanosaurian sauropod Titanomachya, ankylosaurs, hadrosauroids, and somphospondylans, have also been found. Other fossils animals include various species of mammals, turtles and snakes.
