= Attenborough and the Giant Dinosaur =

- Genre: Nature documentary
- Directed by: Charlotte Scott
- Presented by: David Attenborough
- Narrated by: David Attenborough
- Country of origin: United Kingdom
- Original language: English
- No. of episodes: 1

Production
- Producer: Charlotte Scott
- Running time: 58 minutes
- Production companies: BBC Natural History Unit, BBC Worldwide, PBS

Original release
- Network: BBC One
- Release: 24 January 2016

Attenborough and the Giant Dinosaur (also known as Raising the Dinosaur Giant) is a 2016 British nature documentary programme made for BBC Television, first shown in the UK on BBC One on 24 January 2016, and in the US on 17 February 2016 on PBS. The programme is presented and narrated by Sir David Attenborough. It presents the state of knowledge at the time of the excavation of the fossilised remains of seven individuals of a new species of titanosaur, unnamed at the time of the programme.

== Synopsis ==
Attenborough and the Giant Dinosaur depicts the discovery in southern Argentina of a new species of titanosaur, a type of long-necked plant-eating sauropod, not named in the programme but later scientifically described as Patagotitan mayorum in 2017. The fossils date from the Cretaceous period. The first fossilised bone, a massive femur (thigh) bone, was found by a shepherd at La Flecha Farm, in the Chubut Province of Patagonia, Argentina, and a further 220 or so bones belonging to seven individuals were excavated by specialists from the Museum of Paleontology Egidio Feruglio, Trelew, Patagonia, under the direction of Dr Diego Pol and Dr José Luis Carballido. The documentary follows the excavation of, research on, and reconstruction of the fossilised skeleton over a period of two years. At the start of the programme it is assumed that all the bones come from a single individual, but by the end a total of seven individuals have been identified.

After excavation, the bones were stabilised with wet toilet paper and plaster of Paris, before being transported out of the site on a specially constructed road. At the museum, the bones were prepared by removing them from the rock matrix. They were then 3D-scanned by an international team of skeleton builders, and a life-size replica was made in Toronto, Canada, using fibreglass cast in computer-cut polystyrene moulds. By the end of the filming period, no skull had been discovered, so the skull of the model was reconstructed using the most likely of the three known titanosaur skulls, based on the single titanosaur tooth found at the site. (Dr Pol explains that Titanosaur skulls rarely survive as they were very delicate bones with light sutures). One of the femur (thigh) bones recovered was 2.4 m long, and a humerus had a circumference of 79 cm at the centre of the shaft, and this allowed the animal to be estimated at 37 m long and 70 metric tons in weight. This would make the titanosaur larger than Argentinosaurus, another species of titanosaur. A ridge on the back of one of the vertebrae, and a few other features allowed the team to identify the titanosaur as a new species.

Volcanic ash around the bones dated them to 101.6 million years old. The dinosaur would have fed on cycads, ferns and conifers, all fibrous, hard-to-digest and low-nutrient foods. A living descendant of such conifers, the monkey puzzle tree (Araucaria araucana), lives at the foot of the Andes. These grow to a great height, over 40 metres in height, and so would have been out of reach of many animals, but not the long-necked titanosaurs. Over 80 teeth from a species of carnivorous carcharodontosaurid dinosaur, Tyrannotitan chubutensis, were also recovered from the site. One of the titanosaur tail vertebrae bore marks that could have been made by Tyrannotitan chubutensis, either through scavenging or hunting.

A total of 223 bones of seven different individuals of the new species were found on three levels at the site, indicating three different occasions on which the animals were deposited at the site. It is speculated whether the animals were coming to water pools that dried up, and so the animals died there of thirst. Another is that the bodies were washed down to the site, but the rivers in the area weren't large enough to move them. A third theory is that nearby volcanos erupted and caused the death of the animals, either directly or by the destruction of the vegetation that they fed on.

Attenborough also visits the dinosaur nesting site at Auca Mahuevo, 800 km (500 miles) north of the titanosaur excavation site. This is the largest known dinosaur nesting site in the world, where many nests of eggs are preserved over a stretch of several kilometres. Attenborough struggles to walk without stepping on dinosaur eggs, and discusses the site with one of its discoverers, Dr Luis Chiappe. Dinosaur eggs occur in four separate layers, indicating the dinosaurs visited the site repeatedly. At the Museo Carmen Funes in Plaza Huincul, Neuquén Province, they look at a fossil egg from the site with mineralised baby dinosaur skin. Others have limb bones and skulls.

At Whipsnade Zoo in Bedfordshire, England, Professor John Hutchinson looks at the gait of elephants, the largest living land animals, to see if they can shed light on how the titanosaur might have moved. He also calculates that the titanosaur's heart would have been some 2m in circumference. The 3D data used to make the replica is also used to make a computer model, allowing the posture and gait of the titanosaur to be studied. Ben Garrod joins the team in Argentina to help work out how the skeleton would have walked, and Komodo dragons illustrate how the titanosaur might have used its tail. Also at Whipsnade Zoo, Attenborough looks at how the long neck of giraffes would allow them to graze on foliage high in trees.

The replica allows the scientists to see that the dinosaur was still not fully grown, and they consider it to be 10% larger than Argentinosaurus.

In the programme Alba Mayo, the owner of the farm, says "I don't have many sheep, but I do have dinosaurs!" She goes on to say "We're surprised and shocked. Apparently it's a unique specimen because of its size."

== Later research on the bones ==
The television programme presented the state of knowledge at the time of the excavation and early research on the bones. The animal was named Patagotitan mayorum in 2017, the year after the programme was released (the species name honouring the Mayo family, on whose land it was found), and the number of individuals represented at the site was reduced from seven to six, all young adults.

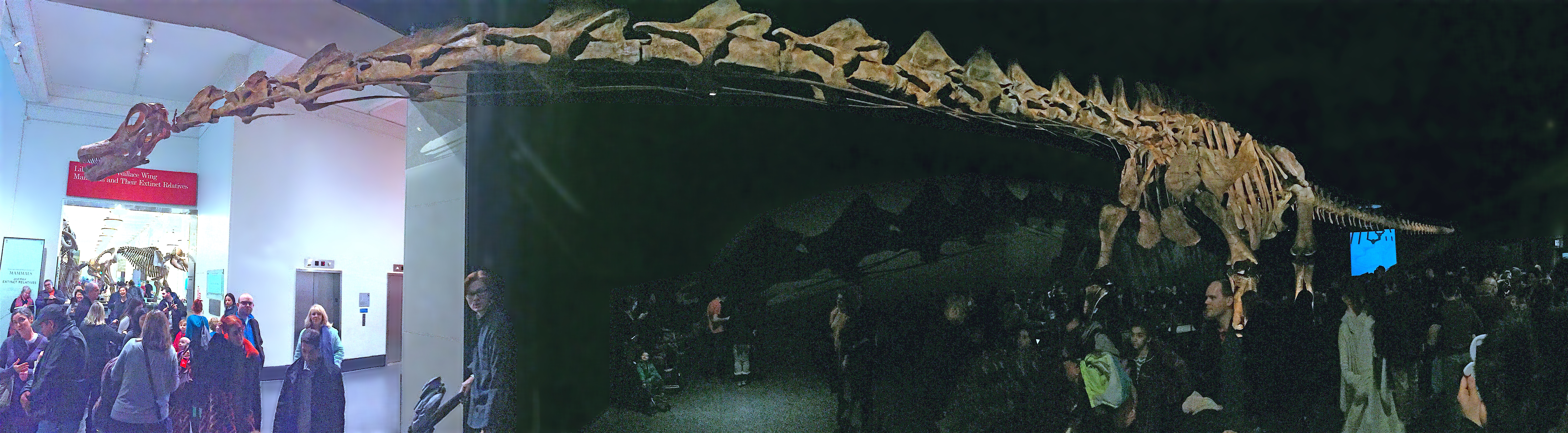
Reconstructed skeleton of Patagotitan mayorum on display at the American Museum of Natural History, New York, USA.

The cast that was made during the programme, and others made in the same way, are now on display in various museums around the world:

- One is exhibited in Museum of Paleontology Egidio Feruglio, Trelew, Patagonia, Argentina.
- Another is exhibited in the American Museum of Natural History, New York City, USA.
- Another is exhibited in the Field Museum of Natural History, Chicago, Illinois, USA.
- From March 2023 until January 2024, one will be displayed at the Natural History Museum, London, England.

== Reception ==
A review in The Guardian by Sam Wollaston commented "Four double decker buses long, almost two high, the largest animal to have ever walked the earth, towering above another ancient great. They haven’t named the beast yet – how about Attenborosaurus?" In The Independent, Amy Burns called the programme "a truly moving piece of TV".

The programme won the Jury's Special Prize at the 2016 Wildscreen Panda Awards, where it was praised for "its “epic scale, compelling storytelling and restrained but excellently judged use of CGI”. At the same awards it was also nominated for the NHK Science Award (won by David Attenborough’s Light on Earth). It was also nominated for The Grierson Trust British Documentary Award.
