= Menucocelsior =

Menucocelsior Temporal range: Late Cretaceous, Maastrichtian

Scientific classification
- Kingdom: Animalia
- Phylum: Chordata
- Class: Reptilia
- Clade: Dinosauria
- Clade: Saurischia
- Clade: †Sauropodomorpha
- Clade: †Sauropoda
- Clade: †Macronaria
- Clade: †Titanosauria
- Clade: †Eutitanosauria
- Genus: †Menucocelsior; Rolando et al. 2022

Type species
- †Menucocelsior arriagadai Rolando et al., 2022

Genus of mid-sized titanosaur

Menucocelsior (meaning "the taller one from Salitral Ojo del Agua") is a genus of medium-sized titanosaurian sauropod dinosaur from the Late Cretaceous Allen Formation of Argentina. The type and only species is Menucocelsior arriagadai.

== Discovery ==
The Salitral Ojo del Agua area of Río Negro, Argentina was home to an entire sauropod fauna during the late Cretaceous period. Fossil material belonging to saltasaurines, aeolosaurines, and other titanosaurs have been discovered. In 2022, Rolando et al. designated one specimen as the type species for a new titanosaurian taxon, Menucocelsior arriagadai. The generic name combines the Mapudungun menuco, meaning "watering hole", a translation of Ojo del Agua, with the Latin celsior, meaning "higher" or "major." The specific name honours "Beto" Arriagada, the owner of the ranch where the discoveries were made.

== Description and classification ==
The holotype, MPCN-PV-798, consists of seventeen caudal vertebrae and several appendicular bones: a right humerus, a left fibula and some metapodial. The structure and form of these bones suggests it was a member of the Eutitanosauria, but not a member of the Colossosauria, Saltasaurinae, or Aeolosaurini. Fossil material suggests that Menucocelsior was about 8 metres (26 ft) long.

== Paleoecology ==
Menucocelsior lived in the Allen Formation alongside a number of other titanosaurs, including the small saltasaurine Rocasaurus and indeterminate saltasaurines and aeolosaurins, known from both skeletal remains and differing morphotypes of osteoderms. The describers note that such an assemblage of titanosaurs is not known anywhere else in the world; the titanosaurs' differing body plans probably allowed them to occupy differing ecological niches and thus limit competition.
