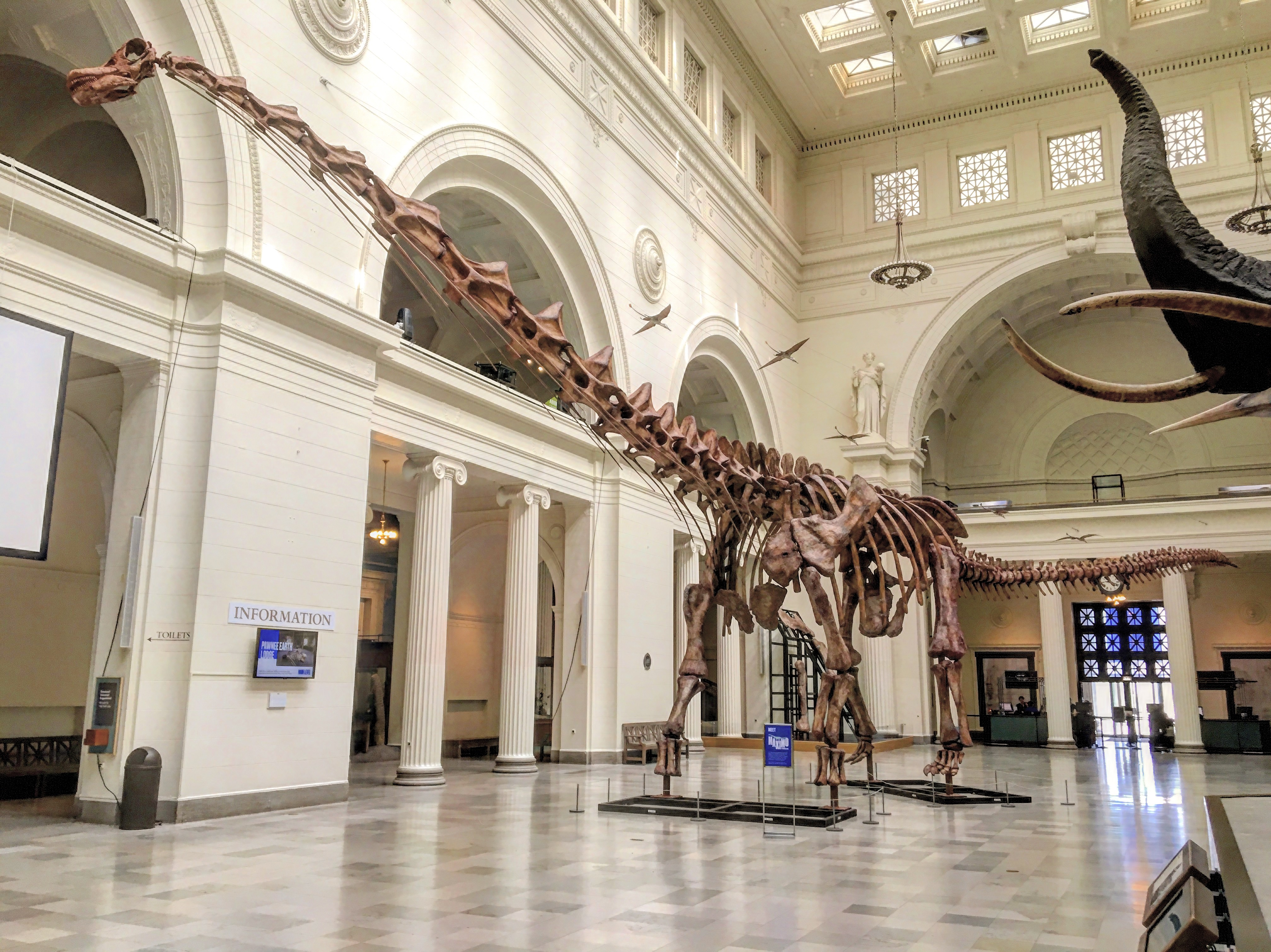
- Reconstructed skeleton on display at the Field Museum of Natural History, Chicago, Illinois, United States

Scientific classification
- Kingdom: Animalia
- Phylum: Chordata
- Class: Reptilia
- Clade: Dinosauria
- Clade: Saurischia
- Clade: †Sauropodomorpha
- Clade: †Sauropoda
- Clade: †Eusauropoda
- Clade: †Macronaria
- Clade: †Titanosauria
- Family: †Argentinosauridae
- Genus: †Patagotitan; Carballido et al., 2017

Type species
- †Patagotitan mayorum Carballido et al., 2017

= Patagotitan =

Patagotitan Temporal range: Early Cretaceous (Albian), 110.78–101.62 Ma

Extinct genus of dinosaurs

Patagotitan is a genus of titanosaurian sauropod dinosaur from the Early Cretaceous (Albian stage) Cerro Barcino Formation in Chubut Province, Patagonia, Argentina. The genus contains a single species known from at least six young adult individuals, Patagotitan mayorum, which was first announced in 2014 and then named in 2017 by José Carballido and colleagues. Originally thought to be the largest known titanosaur and land animal overall, preliminary studies and press releases suggested that Patagotitan had an estimated length of 37 m (121 ft) and an estimated weight of 69 tonnes (76 short tons). Later research revised the length estimate down to 31 m (102 ft) and weight estimates down to approximately 50–60 tonnes (55–66 short tons), suggesting that Patagotitan was of a similar size to, if not smaller than, its closest relatives Argentinosaurus and Puertasaurus. Still, Patagotitan is one of the best-known titanosaurs, and so its interrelationships with other titanosaurs have been relatively consistent in phylogenetic analyses. This led to its use in a re-definition of the group Colossosauria by Carballido and colleagues in 2022.

Like Argentinosaurus and other members of its clade, Lognkosauria, Patagotitan was a particularly large and robust titanosaur. It can be distinguished from its close relatives by a suite of unique characteristics in its back and tail vertebrae, scapulae and humeri in the forelimb, and ischia and femora in the hindlimb. Among these was the presence of accessory vertebral articulations known as the hyposphene-hypantrum articulations between only one pair of vertebrae at the level of the scapular blade, which was likely a weight-bearing adaptation not seen in any other sauropod (where they were either present between all pairs or between none). Several unique features in the limbs were also likely attachment scars for muscles. In life, Patagotitan lived in a forested region on a floodplain that was dominated by coniferous trees.

== Discovery ==
A part of a lower femur was discovered in 2010 by a farm laborer, Aurelio Hernández, in the desert near La Flecha, Argentina, about 250 km (160 mi) west of Trelew. This discovery was reported to P. Huerta at the Museum of Paleontology Egidio Feruglio (MPEF) in Trelew. One preliminary field expedition to the La Flecha site was carried out in late 2012 by the MPEF, followed by seven further expeditions that discovered new fossils between January 2013 and February 2015. The lead scientists on the excavation were Jose Luis Carballido and Diego Pol, with partial funding from The Jurassic Foundation. More than 200 fossils, including 130 sauropod bones and 57 theropod teeth, were uncovered. The rock layers at the La Flecha site belong to the Cerro Castaño Member of the Cerro Barcino Formation, and were specifically dated to approximately 101.62 million years in age (corresponding to the latest Albian age of the Cretaceous).

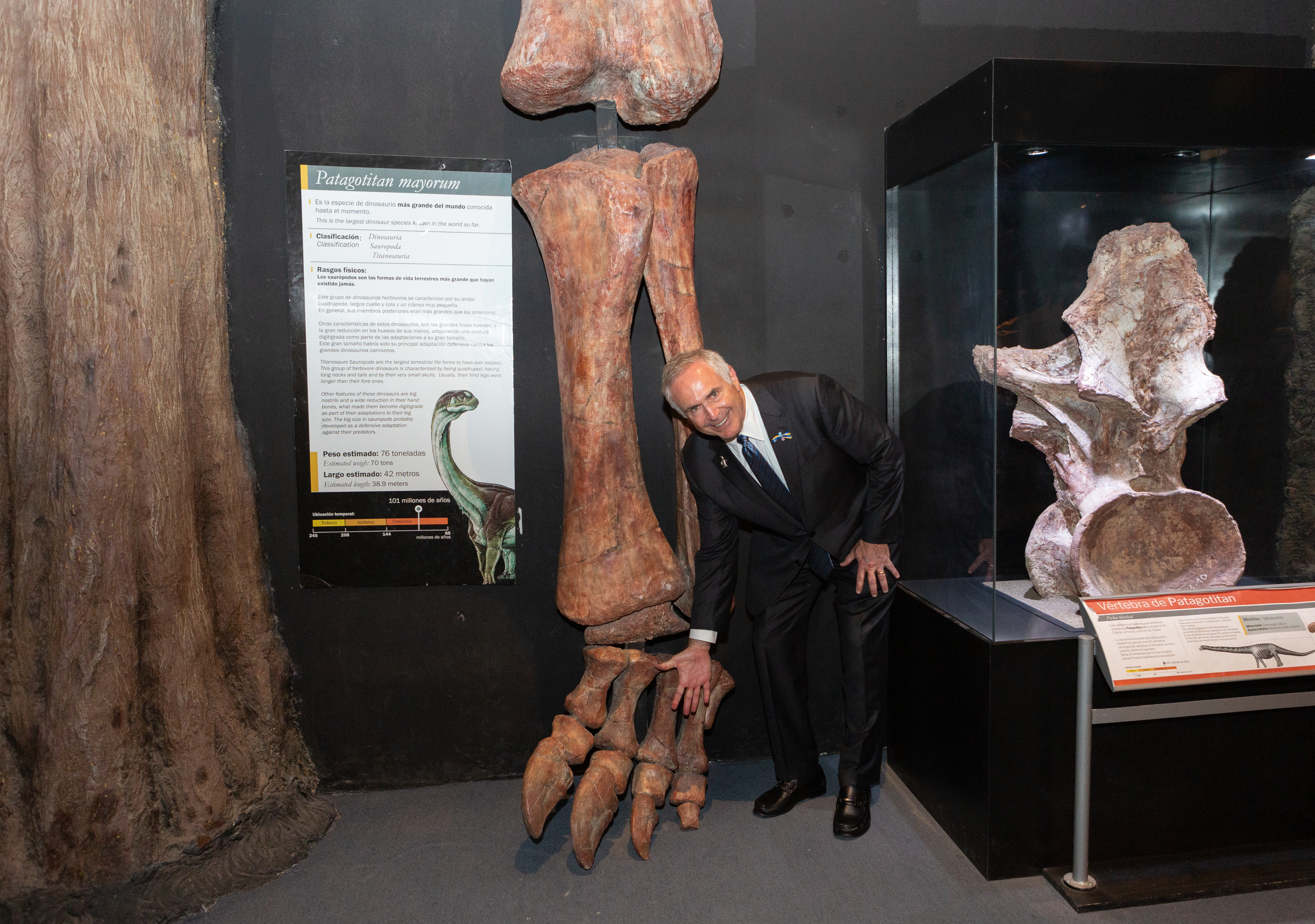
US ambassador to Argentina Marc R. Stanley with Patagotitan bones

The collected sauropod fossils were organized into six partial skeletons, which likely belonged to the same species due to uniformity in their morphology and size (with all individuals differing no more than 5% in length). Although the remains all came from the same quarry, the individuals likely did not all die at the same time. Within the 3.43-metre (11.3 ft) sediment layer containing the fossils, there are three distinct but closely-spaced levels corresponding to three burial events, which are named FLV1, FLV2, and FLV3. One skeleton from FLV3 was designated as the holotype specimen of a new species, and was catalogued as MPEF-PV 3400. It consists of a partial skeleton lacking the skull, with three neck vertebrae, six back vertebrae, six front tail vertebrae, three chevrons, ribs, both plates of the sternum and the right scapulocoracoid in the shoulder girdle, both pubic bones, and both femora. The skeleton was chosen to be the holotype because it was the best preserved and also the one showing the most distinguishing traits.

Other specimens were designated as the paratypes. Based on overlapping elements, these include at least three individuals from FLV1, one from FLV2, and one from FLV3 other than the holotype. MPEF-PV 3399 (from FLV1) is a second skeleton consisting of six neck vertebrae, four back vertebrae, one front tail vertebra, sixteen rear tail vertebrae, ribs, chevrons, the left ulna and radius, both ischia, the left pubic bone, and the left femur. MPEF-PV 3372 (from FLV1) is a tooth. MPEF-PV 3393 (not associated with a layer) is a rear tail vertebra. MPEF-PV 3395 and MPEV-PV 3396 (both from FLV1) are left humeri, while MPEF-PV 3397 (from FLV2) is a right humerus. MPEF-PV 3375 (FLV3) is a left femur while MPEF-PV 3394 (FLV1) is a right femur. MPEF-PV 3391 and MPEF-PV 3392 (both from FLV1) represent two fibulae. Another quarry was excavated about 300 metres (980 ft) west, revealing a fourth sediment layer (FLV4) with a similarly sized sauropod skeleton.

In 2017, José Luis Carballido, Diego Pol, Alejandro Otero, Ignacio Alejandro Cerda, Leonardo Salgado, Alberto Carlos Garrido, Jahandar Ramezani, Néstor Ruben Cúneo and Javier Marcelo Krause named these remains as the type species of a new genus, Patagotitan mayorum. Collectively, the known remains made Patagotitan one of the most completely-known members of the Titanosauria. The generic name combines a reference to Patagonia with a Greek Titan for the "strength and large size" of this titanosaur. The specific name honours the Mayo family, owners of La Flecha ranch.

In 2019, Carballido and Pol published Titanosaur, a children's book with illustrations by Florencia Gigena. The book tells the story of their La Flecha fossil dig in scientific detail and is intended to inspire young paleontologists.

A life sized replica of the Patagotitan mayorum stands near Trelew, Argentina (2024).

=== Exhibits ===
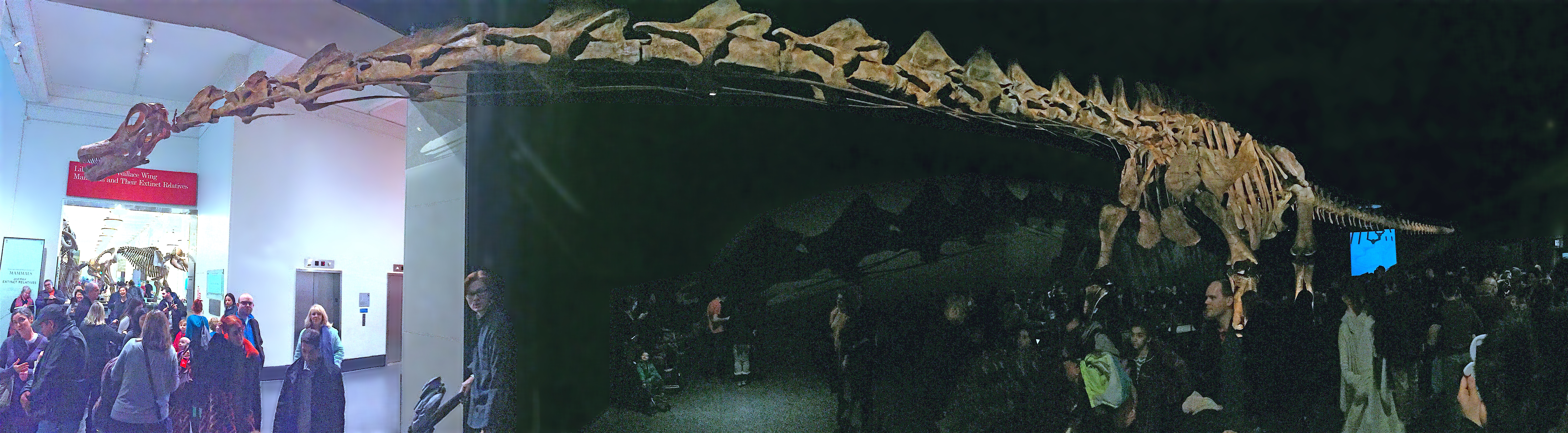
Reconstructed skeleton on display at the American Museum of Natural History, New York

Skeletal mounts based on all available material of Patagotitan are displayed in multiple museums. Research Casting International digitally scanned the specimens, which was followed by the creation of foam molds, fiberglass casts, and 3D printing. One mount is exhibited in the Museum of Paleontology Egidio Feruglio. Another is exhibited in the American Museum of Natural History, where it replaced a juvenile Barosaurus mount. Some of the original fossils, including a femur, were also on display briefly. One is exhibited in the Field Museum of Natural History, where it replaced the Sue specimen of Tyrannosaurus (which has been moved to another exhibit). From March 2023 until January 2024, one was displayed at the Natural History Museum, London.

== Description ==
=== Size ===
P. mayorum compared with a human

Like other titanosaur sauropods, Patagotitan was a quadrupedal herbivore with a long neck and tail and is notable for its large size. Carballido and colleagues stated in the media:

Given the size of these bones, which surpass any of the previously known giant animals, the new dinosaur is the largest animal known that walked on Earth.

In 2014 news reports provided estimates of Patagotitan's size at 40 m (131 ft) long with a weight of 77 tonnes (85 short tons). In 2017, Carballido and colleagues published a length estimate of 37 m (121 ft), and provided two weight estimates: 69 tonnes (76 short tons) using a scaling equation, and 44.2–77.6 tonnes (43.5–76.4 long tons; 48.7–85.5 short tons) using volumetric method based on 3D skeletal models. These estimates suggested that Patagotitan was 10% larger than Argentinosaurus. In 2019 Gregory S. Paul estimated Patagotitan at 31 m (102 ft) in length and 50–55 tonnes (49–54 long tons; 55–61 short tons) in weight using volumetric models. This made it smaller than Argentinosaurus, which he estimated at over 35 m (115 ft) in length and 65–75 tonnes (64–74 long tons; 72–83 short tons) in weight. In 2020, Campione and Evans yielded a body mass estimate of approximately 55.7 tonnes (54.8 long tons; 61.4 short tons). In 2020, Otero and Carballido published a lower mean weight estimate of 57 tonnes (56 long tons; 63 short tons) using a revised scaling equation, with a margin of error of 42.5–71.4 tonnes (41.8–70.3 long tons; 46.8–78.7 short tons); this was close to the 2017 volumetric estimate. Histology of five femora and one humerus indicates that the individuals died while they were young adults, with growth having slowed but not ceased entirely. In 2024, Paul estimated its length at 31 m (102 ft), and its weight at 57 tonnes (56 long tons; 63 short tons). In 2025, Matthew Dempsey estimated Patagotitan's weight at over 60 tonnes (59 long tons; 66 short tons).

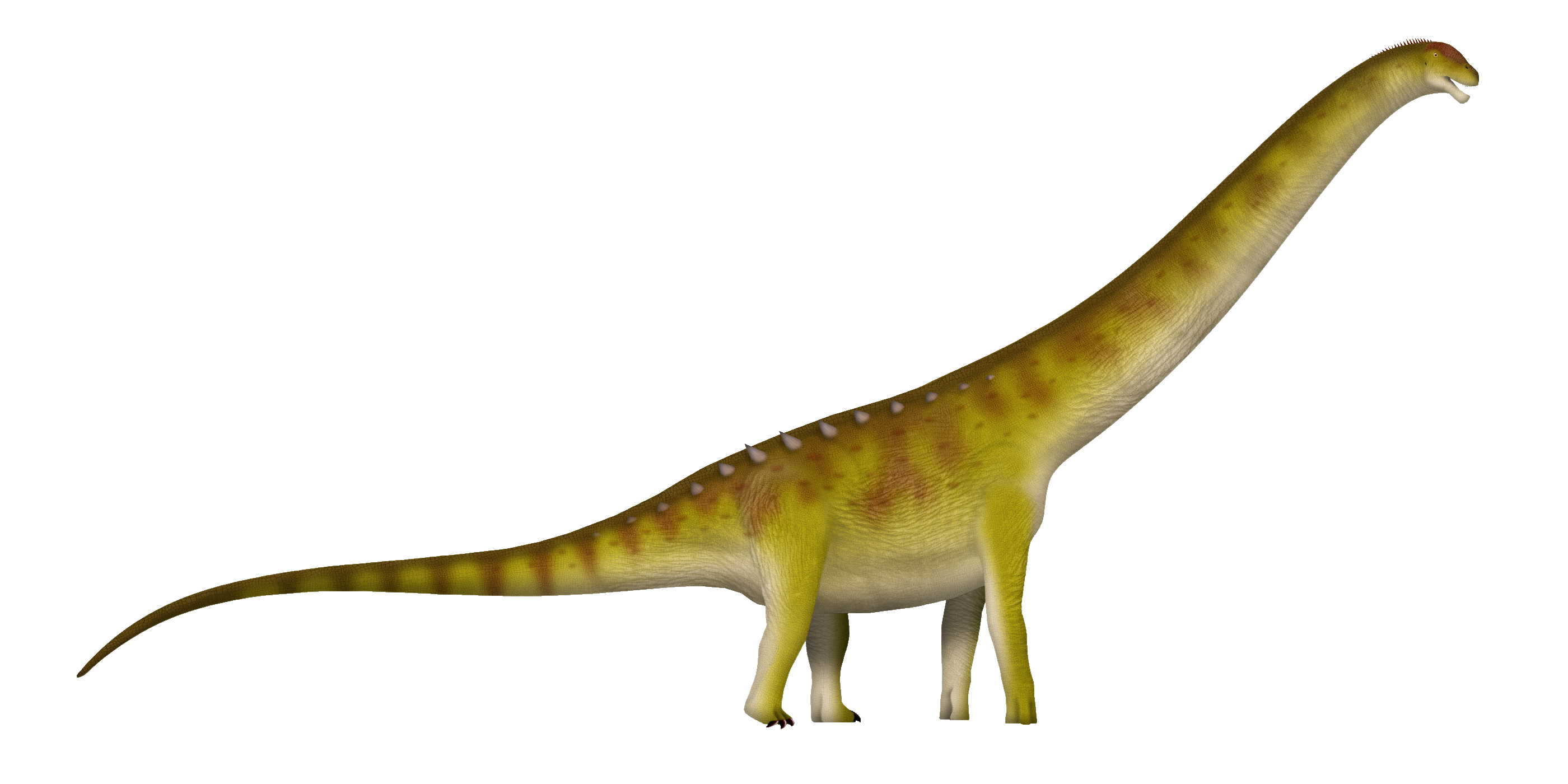
Life restoration

Following the initial publication of Patagotitan in 2017, science writer Riley Black and paleontologist Matt Wedel cautioned against the reported estimates. In blog posts, Wedel noted that based on available measurements Patagotitan was comparable in size with other known giant titanosaurs. However, almost every measurement that could be compared was larger in Argentinosaurus. Wedel also criticised the polygon-based method that Carballido and colleagues used to compare the sizes of Patagotitan and Argentinosaurus' vertebrae, noting that the former was largely empty space. In other studies, Argentinosaurus has been estimated at 65–96.4 tonnes (71.7–106.3 short tons). In 2019, Paul noted that the articulated length of the back vertebrae was larger in Argentinosaurus (4.47 metres (14.7 ft)) than in Patagotitan (3.67 metres (12.0 ft)), making it impossible for Patagotitan to have had a larger torso. For Patagotitan to have been larger, he reasoned that the rest of its body would have to have been improbably large, or vice versa in Argentinosaurus. He attributed this conclusion to a lack of proper measurement techniques. Also, he criticized the 3D model used for the volumetric estimate as having a flat-sided torso, and noted that the neck and tail were reconstructed as being fairly long.

=== Vertebrae ===
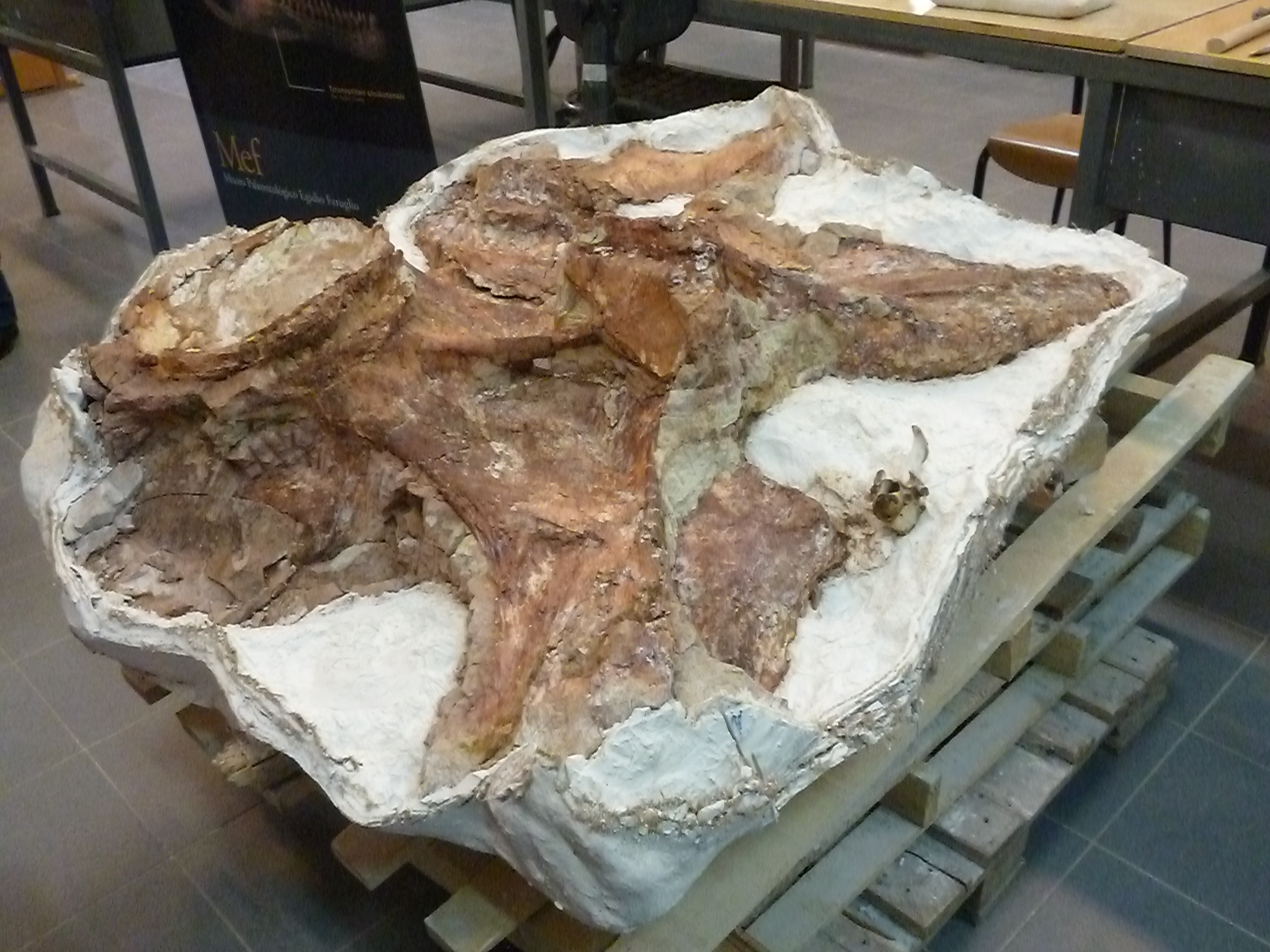
Back vertebra, showing the vertical neural spine to the right which bears the prespinal lamina on top

The vertebrae in the front and middle portions of the neck of Patagotitan were very long, being at least five times as long as they were wide at the back, with neural spines on top that were horizontally flattened, and only small holes and no large pleurocoels (neurovascular openings) on the sides. By contrast, the rear neck vertebrae of Patagotitan had deep pleurocoels that opened from the sides into the interior of the bone; whether the neural spines of these vertebrae were horizontally expanded as in Futalognkosaurus, Ligabuesaurus, and Mendozasaurus cannot be determined.

Like Futalognkosaurus and other titanosaurs that preserved a complete set of back vertebrae, Patagotitan probably had 10. Several characteristics in the back vertebrae distinguished Patagotitan from other titanosaurs. The laminae, ridges of bone crossing the vertebrae, were thin and strongly developed in the back vertebrae of Patagotitan, unlike Argentinosaurus and Puertasaurus. Uniquely, the prezygodiapophyseal laminae (PRDLs, which ran between articular processes, from the prezygapophyses at the front to the diapophyses at the sides) were nearly vertical because the prezygapophyses were situated higher up on the vertebrae than the diapophyses. The PRDLs usually instead extended forward from the diapophyses in other sauropods. All of the neural spines in the back were tall and vertical in Patagotitan, and the first few had expanded, arrow-shaped ends. Argentinosaurus had front neural spines with arrow-shaped ends, but like other members of the Titanosauriformes the rear neural spines were inclined backwards; Patagotitan represents a reversal to the condition in non-titanosauriforms. Dreadnoughtus, Puertasaurus, and other members of the Lognkosauria had short front neural spines lacking the arrow-shaped ends. Uniquely, in the first two back vertebrae, the prespinal laminae that ran alongside the front of the neural spines bulged outwards near the bottom. Also uniquely, the third back vertebra preserves a hyposphene at the rear end but not a hypantrum at the front; the missing fourth back vertebra presumably had a corresponding hypantrum. Hyposphene-hypantrum articulations to stiffen the vertebrae were primitively present among sauropods and lost multiple times, but Patagotitan is the first known sauropod where they were retained between only one pair of vertebrae. Because the shoulder blade was located at this position, this may have been a weight-bearing adaptation.

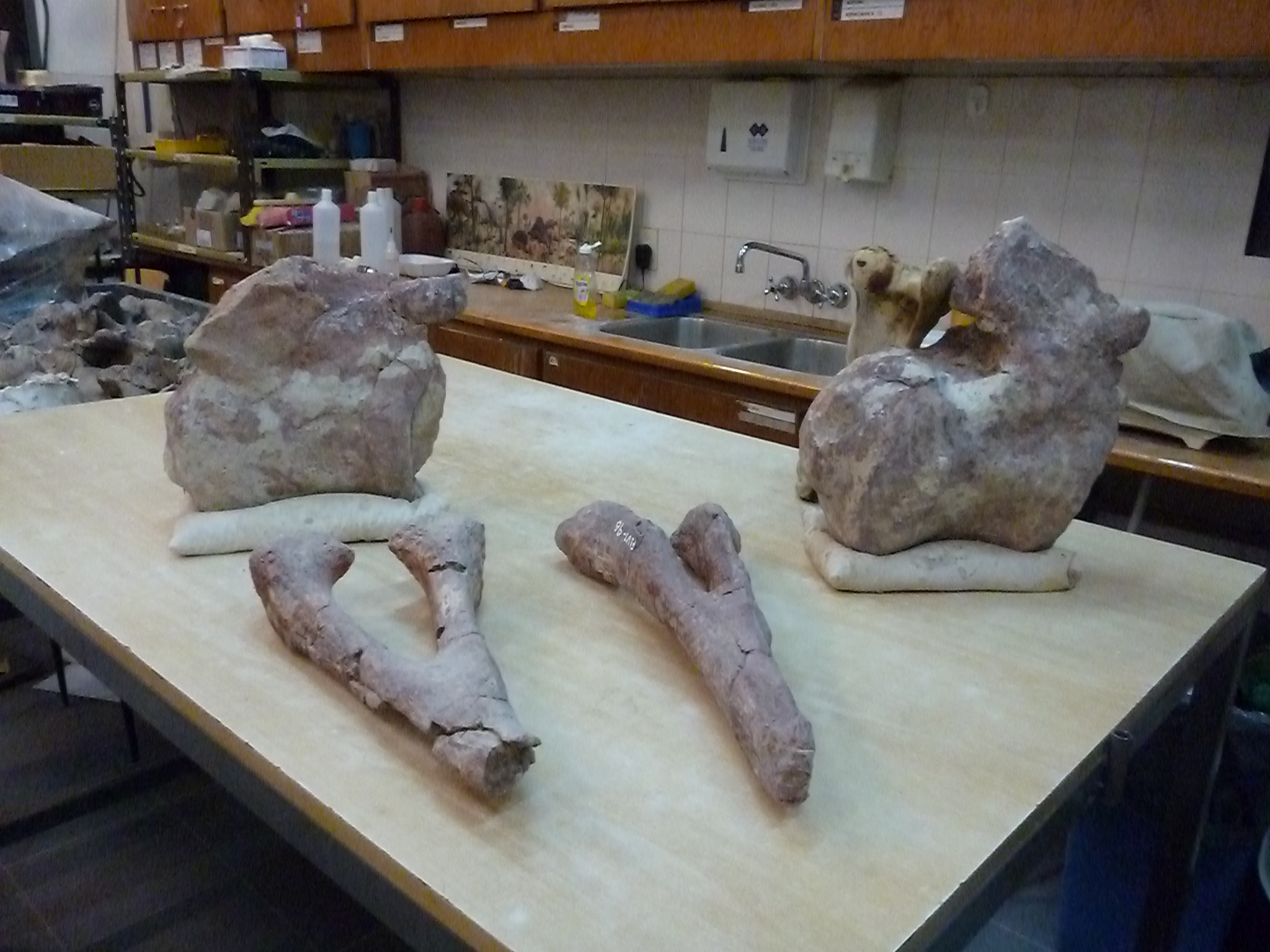
Chevrons and rear tail vertebrae

In most titanosaurs, the front tail vertebrae were procoelous, meaning that the front articulating surface was concave and the rear one was convex. Uniquely in Patagotitan, the front articulating surface of the first tail vertebra was flat. Also uniquely, the neural spines of the front tail vertebrae were about four to six times as wide from side to side as they were long front to back, contrasting with the condition in Dreadnoughtus, Epachthosaurus, and Malawisaurus where they were longer front to back. They were also tall, being 1.5 times taller than the underlying centra (vertebral bodies). Yet another unique characteristic was that the tops of the neural spines were concave, making them somewhat bifurcated with the tips curling forwards. On the neural spine, longitudinal laminae separated from the prespinal and postspinal laminae, which was previously only seen in Bonitasaura. At the sides of the front tail vertebrae, the transverse processes (on which the diapophyses were located) were high and thin, like Futalognkosaurus and Mendozasaurus but unlike Dreadnoughtus and other titanosaurs. Unlike the Diplodocidae, where the transverse processes of the front tail vertebrae formed wing-like shapes, they were wider at the bottom in Patagotitan. These expanded transverse processes would have resulted in greater attachment areas for the caudofemoralis longus, ilio-ischiocaudalis, and spinalis muscles, and therefore a more muscular tail. Also like Futalognkosaurus, Mendozasaurus, and Drusilasaura, well-developed spinodiapophyseal laminae (SDLs) ran from the neural spines down the tranverse processes to the diapophyses.

=== Limbs and limb girdles ===
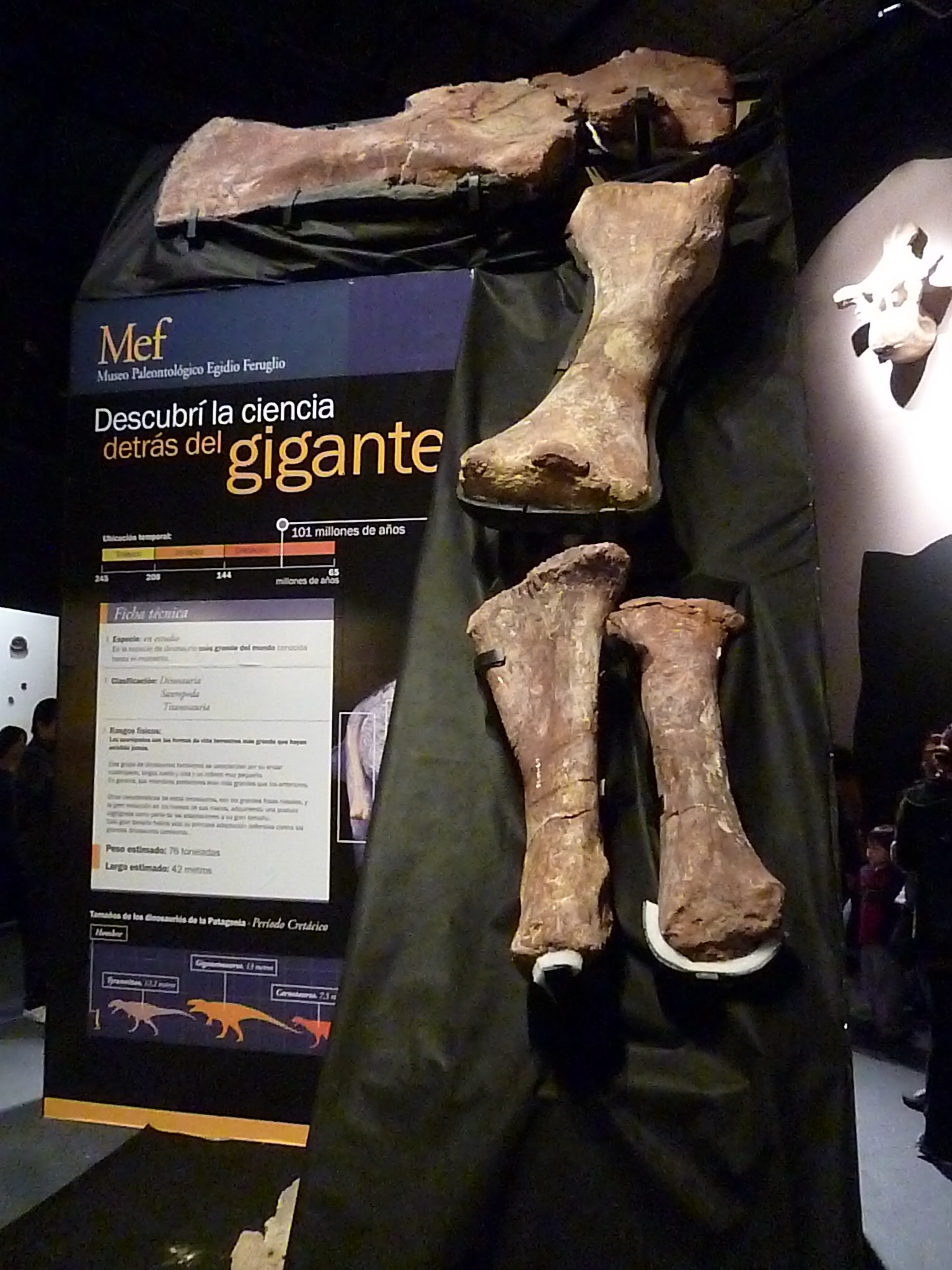
Forelimb and scapula at Museo Egidio Feruglio de Trelew, Chubut

Patagotitan had a robust, expanded scapula, with the blade being only 4.15 times as long as it was wide at its narrowest point; except for Drusilasaura, Isisaurus, Neuquensaurus, and Saltasaurus, this figure was usually considerably higher among the Macronaria. Furthermore, expansion was present at both ends such that the top end of the scapula was roughly at the same level as the bottom end, which was an uncommon characteristic also seen in Isisaurus. However, like other titanosaurs, the acromion ridge was about 30% as long as the scapula. In addition to a projection at the bottom of the scapula just behind the shoulder joint (glenoid), which was common among titanosaurs, there was a second one further back at the beginning of the blade, only seen otherwise in Alamosaurus, Dreadnoughtus, Drusilasaura, Elaltitan, and Sauroposeidon. Furthermore, in addition to a ridge that ran along the midline of the blade parallel to the bottom, there was a second ridge that ran upwards diagonally to the top of the bone, which was unique to Patagotitan. The articulating surface of the coracoid with the scapula was 80% as long front-to-back as it was tall, an uncommon characteristic shared with Giraffatitan, Ruyangosaurus, and Tapuiasaurus. Like other titanosauriforms, the sternal plates were crescent-shaped with the outer edge being slightly concave (more like Dreadnoughtus and Savannasaurus than the Saltasauridae, in which it was strongly concave). There was a ridge running diagonally from the outer bottom corner of each sternal plate that was oriented similarly to Dreadnoughtus and Opisthocoelicaudia.

The humerus of Patagotitan was on average 28% as broad as it was long, making it similarly robust to those of Notocolossus and Rapetosaurus but less so than those of saltasaurids. Like Dreadnoughtus, Epachthosaurus, and Opisthocoelicaudia, it was about 70% as long as the femur. A number of bulges for muscle attachment on the humerus were unique characteristics of Patagotitan. In a depression (fossa) on the front upper portion of the humerus, there was a pair of scars above each other, with the top one being wider than tall and the bottom one being taller than wide; this was where the coracobrachialis muscle inserted. On the other side of the bone, behind the deltopectoral crest on the outer side, there was one scar at the midpoint of the crest and one at the bottom; this was where the supracoracoideus, deltoideus clavicularis, and latissimus dorsi muscles inserted. The ulna was robust, being about 50% as broad at the top as it was long like Dreadnoughtus, Isisaurus, Neuquensaurus, Opisthocoelicaudia, and Saltasaurus. However, the inward-pointing anteromedial process of the ulna was relatively slender, being 3.5 times as long as it was wide, and was also relatively horizontal with an angle of 40°; Patagotitan differed from Neuquensaurus in both aspects. The bottom end of the bone was mildly expanded, though not to the extent of Opisthocoelicaudia and Saltasaurus. The radius was also fairly expanded, being 36% as broad at the top as it was long. On the inner edge of the radius, a bulging scar for the attachment of the biceps brachii muscle extended towards the front of the bone as a crest, as also seen in Elaltitan (Giraffatitan and Haestasaurus exhibited the bulge without the crest).

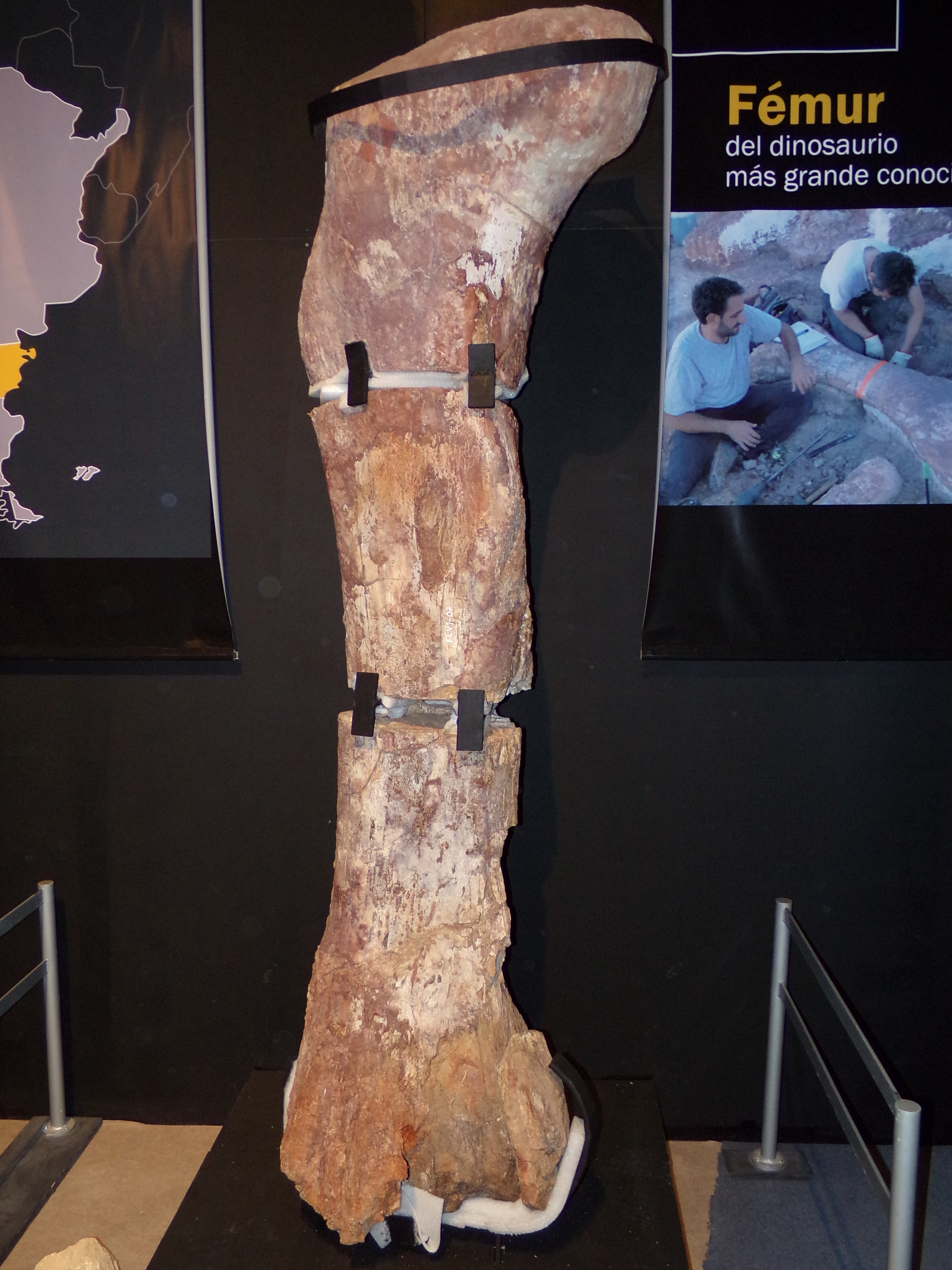
Femur

In the hip girdle, the contact between the forward-pointing pubis and backward-pointing ischium was about half of the former's length (longer than Dreadnoughtus, Futalognkosaurus, Muyelensaurus, and Qiaowanlong) but less than half of the latter's length (common, except in Isisaurus, Malawisaurus, and saltasaurids). The articulation between the pubic bones was clearly demarcated from their articulations with other bones by deflected surfaces, as in Alamosaurus and Elaltitan. Like Uberabatitan, there was a ridge running along the side of the pubis that vanished near the obturator foramen (which was elongated like other titanosauriforms) at the top. Like Elaltitan and Futalognkosaurus but unlike Alamosaurus, the bottom of the pubic "boot" was not particularly expanded. On the side of the ischium, there was also a well-developed ridge (seen to a lesser extent in the titanosauriforms Andesaurus, Jiangshanosaurus, and Venenosaurus) extending down the ischial tuberosity (a common feature among titanosaurs) down to the blade, with the combination of these features being unique to Patagotitan. Like the humerus, the femur of Patagotitan was robust, being on average 23% as broad as it was long, similar to Rocasaurus but somewhat less than Diamantinasaurus, Opisthocoelicaudia, and Saltasaurus. Like other titanosauriforms, the head of the femur was angled upwards relative to the greater trochanter on its outer top end. Like Neuquensaurus and Rapetosaurus, a ridge ran along the back of the femur between these two features, but there was no ridge in front like Alamosaurus, Diamantinasaurus, and saltasaurines. Like Bonitasaura, Neuquensaurus, Rapetosaurus, and Saltasaurus, the fourth trochanter on the inner surface of the femur was located a third of the way from the top instead of halfway down. Uniquely among sauropods, at the outer edge of the bottom of the femur, there were a series of coarse ridges right above the articulation known as the lateral condyle; this was where the flexor digitorum longus muscle inserted.

== Classification ==
In 2017, a phylogenetic analysis by Carballido and colleagues placed Patagotitan as the sister group to its closest relative, Argentinosaurus; the two were united by the presence of long neural spines in the front back vertebrae. These two were placed within the Lognkosauria, based on the SDLs, the tall transverse processes, and small laminae that connect the neural spine to the prezygapophyses (i.e., spinoprezygapophyseal laminae or SPPLs) in the tail vertebrae of Patagotitan. The last of these characteristics were used to group lognkosaurs with Notocolossus to the exclusion of other titanosaurs, where the SPPLs of the tail vertebrae were much better-developed. Notably, this emergence of this grouping corresponded to a major increase in body size as it contained the largest titanosaurs, with maximum weights increasing from 20 to 60 tonnes (22 to 66 short tons). Dreadnoughtus and Alamosaurus represented independent increases in body size to a much lesser extent. The group of lognkosaurs, Notocolossus, and Bonitasaura was recovered as the sister group of Rinconsauria. Lastly, unlike the results of prior analyses, the analysis of Carballido and colleagues placed Lognkosauria outside the Lithostrotia, as separate groups within the Eutitanosauria and in turn the Titanosauria. The following phylogenetic tree shows the results of their phylogenetic analysis.

- Titanosauria
  - Wintonotitan
  - Andesaurus
  - - - Ruyangosaurus
      - Malarguesaurus
    - - Epachthosaurus
      - Eutitanosauria
        - - Dreadnoughtus
          - Lithostrotia
            - Malawisaurus
            - - Baurutitan
              - - Nemegtosaurus
                - Trigonosaurus
                - Alamosaurus
                - Opisthocoelicaudia
                - Saltasaurus
                - Neuquensaurus
                - - Rapetosaurus
                  - - Isisaurus
                    - Tapuiasaurus
        - - Rinconsauria
            - Rinconsaurus
            - - Muyelensaurus
              - - Aeolosaurus
                - Overosaurus
          - - Bonitasaura
            - - Notocolossus
              - Lognkosauria
                - Mendozasaurus
                - - - Futalognkosaurus
                    - Quetecsaurus
                  - - Puertasaurus
                    - Drusilasaura
                    - - Argentinosaurus
                      - Patagotitan

Historically, the interrelationships of titanosaurs have been highly unstable and varied between different analyses. Despite this, Patagotitan has been consistently found as being grouped with Argentinosaurus and Puertasaurus in analyses including the three titanosaurs, with either one being its closest relative. In 2018, Bernardo González Riga and colleagues found Patagotitan to form a polytomy with Puertasaurus and Notocolossus, with Argentinosaurus being closest to this group; unlike Carballido and colleagues, however, they recovered the Lognkosauria within the Lithostrotia. In 2019, González Riga and colleagues recovered the same arrangement, and they named the group formed by the Lognkosauria and the Rinconsauria as Colossosauria. Also in 2019, Philip Mannion and colleagues found the group of Patagotitan, Puertasaurus, and Notocolossus in a polytomy with other titanosaurs, which included Argentinosaurus, Futalognkosaurus, Mendozasaurus, and others depending on the exclusion of some other titanosaurs from the analysis; this exclusion also affected whether Lognkosauria was inside Lithostrotia. In 2020, Carballido and colleagues found again that Patagotitan grouped with Argentinosaurus, with their grouping being in a polytomy with Puertasaurus and Drusilasaura, and Lognkosauria being outside Lithostrotia; Federico Agnolin and colleagues found a similar arrangement in 2023. In 2021, Otero and colleagues recovered the same arrangement. Also in 2021, Pablo Gallina and colleagues recovered a similar arrangement, except with Ninjatitan possibly being closer to Patagotitan and Argentinosaurus than Puertasaurus. In 2023, Agustín Pérez Moreno and colleagues performed an analysis based on that of Gallina and colleagues, and found a similar arrangement except with Ninjatitan closer to the Rinconsauria.

Due to its completeness, Carballido and colleagues in 2022 found that Patagotitan was among the most phylogenetically stable titanosaurs, with a high recuperation index of 62% (meaning that it is stable enough to not be removed due to instability in 62% of analyses) due to its firm position within the Lognkosauria. They found that the uncertainty regarding whether Lognkosauria belonged within Lithostrotia largely arose from the definition of Lithostrotia, which was based on the phylogenetically unstable Malawisaurus. Instead of using Lithostrotia, they suggested that Eutitanosauria be divided into Saltasauroidea and Colossosauria. They also refined Colossosauria as being the most inclusive group that includes Patagotitan (instead of the less stable Mendozasaurus) but not Saltasaurus. The following phylogenetic tree shows their suggested group definitions, including only the most stable titanosaurs.

- Titanosauria
  - Andesaurus
  - - Diamantinasauria
      Diamantinasaurus
    - Eutitanosauria
      - Saltasauroidea
        - Nemegtosaurus
        - Saltasauridae
          - Opisthocoelicaudiinae
            Opisthocoelicaudia
          - Saltasaurinae
            Saltasaurus
      - Colossosauria
        - Epachthosaurus
        - - Rinconsauria
            - Rinconsaurus
            - - Muyelensaurus
              - Aeolosaurini
                - Aeolosaurus
                - Gondwanatitan
          - Lognkosauria
            - Futalognkosaurus
            - - Mendozasaurus
              - Patagotitan

== Paleoecology ==
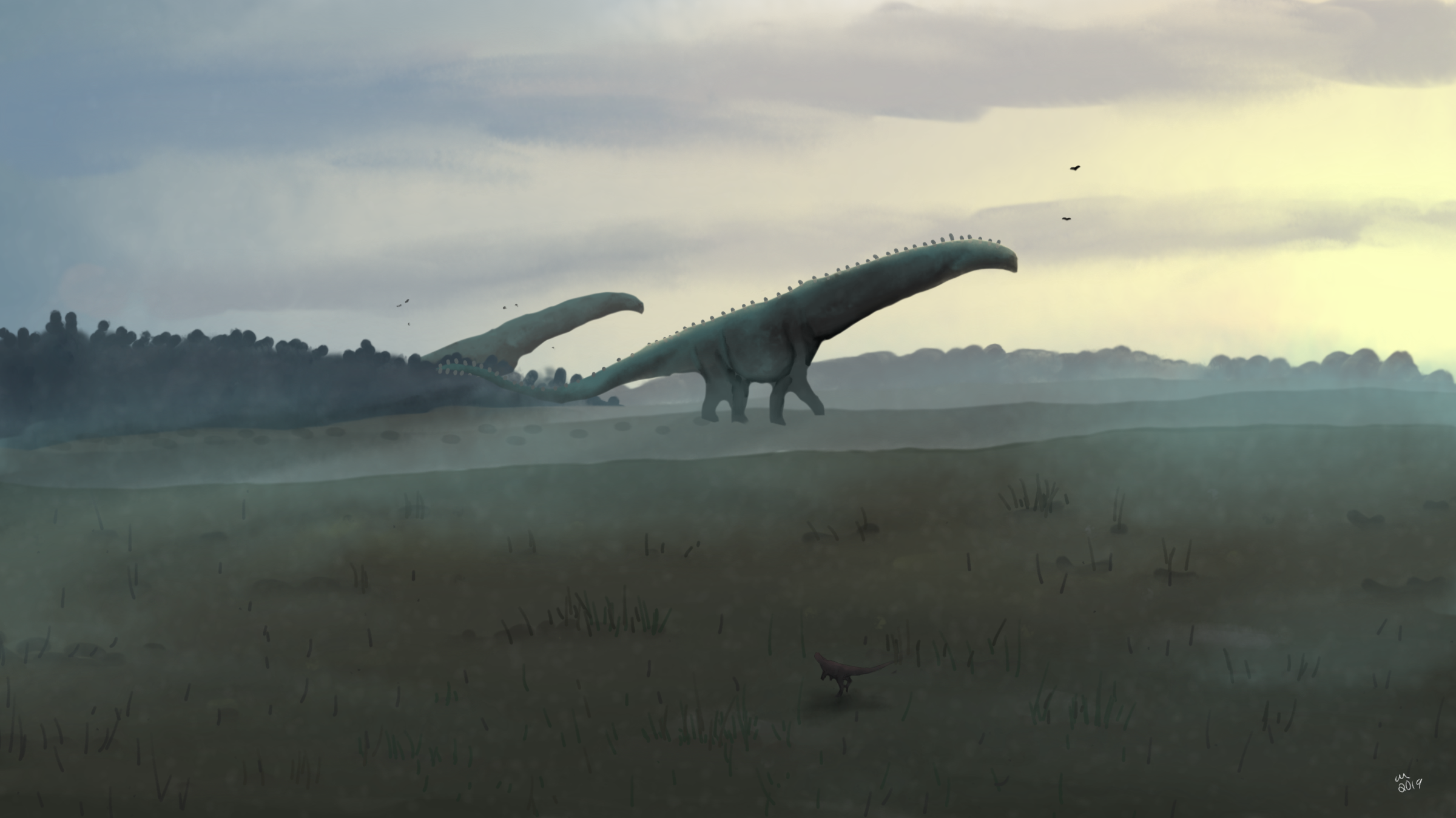
Life restoration of two Patagotitans at dawn

Patagotitan lived in what was then a forested region. Numerous plant fossils were found at a site about 200 metres (660 ft) away from the Patagotitan specimens, including pinnules from ferns; leaves, cones, and fossilized wood from conifers; and leaf and flower impressions and fossilized wood from angiosperms. The plant fauna was dominated by conifers, with angiosperm wood being relatively rare. A new genus of cypress similar to the living Fitzroya and Pilgerodendron, Austrocupressinoxylon, was named from the fossilized wood in 2019; these trees were estimated as having been 15.3 metres (50 ft) tall. A new species of the angiosperm wood genus Carlquistoxylon, C. australe, was also named in 2018.

The fine-grained sandstone and tuff-bearing siltstone sediments of the Cerro Castaño Member, from which the specimens of Patagotitan were uncovered, are indicative of low-energy water flow on a floodplain, likely related to sporadic sheet flooding. This flooding was probably too weak to transport the bones of Patagotitan, meaning that the individuals were preserved where they died. Animals from other localities in the Cerro Castaño Member include the theropod dinosaurs Tyrannotitan and Genyodectes, the peirosaurid crocodyliform Barcinosuchus, and the cryptodire turtle Chubutemys.

== In popular culture ==
A BBC television programme broadcast in January 2016 and presented by Sir David Attenborough, Attenborough and the Giant Dinosaur, followed the excavation, research and reconstruction of the La Flecha Patagotitan fossils over a two-year period. The programme is also known by the alternative title, Raising the Dinosaur Giant.

== See also ==
- Largest dinosaurs
