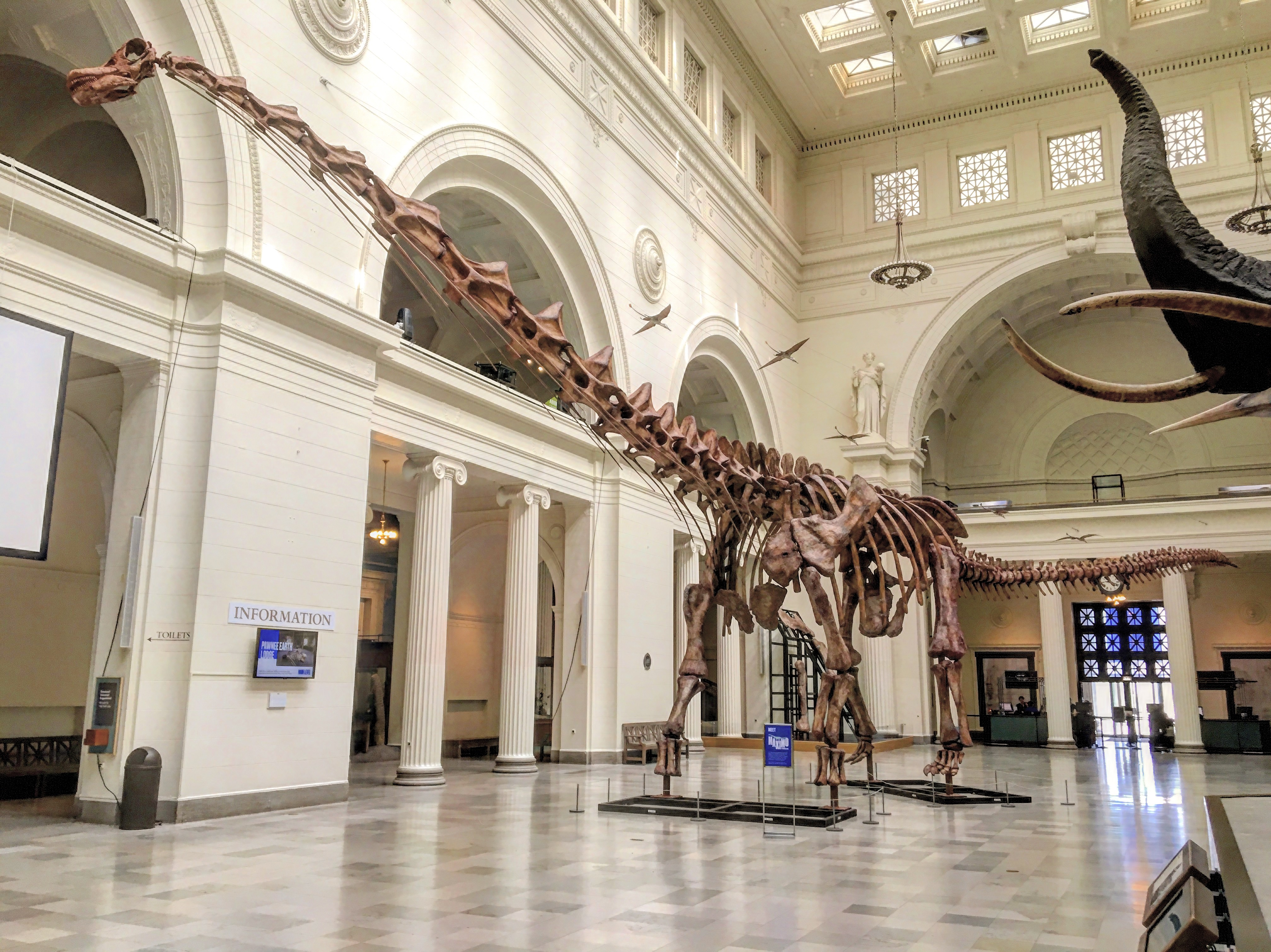
- Skeleton of Patagotitan

Scientific classification
- Kingdom: Animalia
- Phylum: Chordata
- Class: Reptilia
- Clade: Dinosauria
- Clade: Saurischia
- Clade: †Sauropodomorpha
- Clade: †Sauropoda
- Clade: †Macronaria
- Clade: †Titanosauria
- Clade: †Eutitanosauria; Sanz et al., 1999

Subgroups
- †Inawentu; †Magyarosaurus; †Menucocelsior; †Paludititan; †Petrustitan; †Colossosauria; †Saltasauroidea

= Eutitanosauria =

Eutitanosaurs Temporal range: Cretaceous, Aptian–Maastrichtian

Clade of titanosaurs

Eutitanosauria is a clade of titanosaurs, encompassing the more derived members of the group and characterized by the absence of the hyposphene-hypantrum articulation and possibly the presence of osteoderms. The group was first named by Sanz and colleagues in 1999, who used it to unite the group of Argyrosaurus, Lirainosaurus, Saltasaurus and the Peiropolis titanosaur. However, this definition was not used as it made the group equivalent to Saltasauridae, so Saldago redefined it in 2003 to be all titanosaurs closer to Saltasaurus than Epachthosaurus. This definition created Eutitanosauria as the sister group to Epachthosaurinae (Epachthosaurus but not Saltasaurus), but was problematic due to the variable nature of Epachthosaurus. Eutitanosauria was often broadly similar to Lithostrotia, and has often been unused or unlabelled on phylogenies. Sometimes Epachthosaurus would be more primitive than Malawisaurus, making Eutitanosauria more encompassing than Lithostrotia, or Epachthosaurus could nest close to Colossosauria and limit Eutitanosauria to a smaller group of saltasauroids. Because of the flexible nature of Epachthosaurus in basal titanosaur phylogeny, Carballido and colleagues redefined the group in 2022 to include the smallest clade of both Patagotitan, a colossosaur, and Saltasaurus, creating a node-stem clade with Colossosauria and Saltasauroidea, presenting the informal cladogram of stable titanosaur clades below.

- Titanosauria
  - Andesaurus
  - - Diamantinasaurus (Diamantinasauria)
    - Eutitanosauria
      - Saltasauroidea
        - Nemegtosaurus
        - Saltasauridae
          - Opisthocoelicaudia (Opisthocoelicaudiinae)
          - Saltasaurus (Saltasaurinae)
      - Colossosauria
        - Epachthosaurus
        - - Lognkosauria
            - Futalognkosaurus
            - - Mendozasaurus
              - Patagotitan
          - Rinconsauria
            - Rinconsaurus
            - - Muyelensaurus
              - Aeolosaurini
                - Gondwanatitan
                - Aeolosaurus
