= Notopolytheles =

Notopolytheles Temporal range: Maastrichtian

Scientific classification
- Kingdom: Animalia
- Phylum: Chordata
- Class: Mammalia
- Order: †Multituberculata
- Family: †Neoplagiaulacidae
- Genus: †Notopolytheles
- Species: †N. joelis

Binomial name
- †Notopolytheles joelis Gelfo et al., 2025

Extinct genus of neoplagiaulacid multituberculate

Notopolytheles is an extinct monotypic genus of neoplagiaulacid multituberculate that lived in South America during the Maastrichtian stage of the Late Cretaceous epoch.

== Etymology ==
The generic name Notopolytheles derives from the Greek words noto, poly, and theles, which mean "southern", "multiple", and "protuberance". The latter two roots refer to the taxonomic identity of Notopolytheles as a multituberculate due to them being notable for possessing many cusps on their cheek teeth, while the former root references the taxon inhabiting the Southern Hemisphere. The specific epithet of the type species, Notopolytheles joelis, honours Joel Hernán Carino, the discoverer of the holotype of the species.
