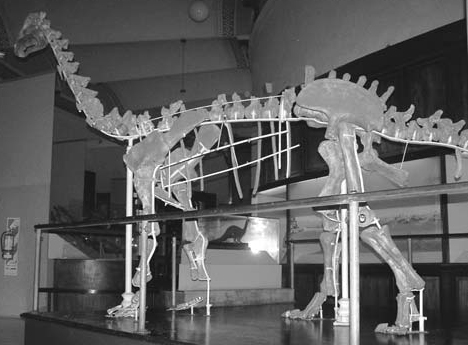
- Skeleton of Neuquensaurus

Scientific classification
- Kingdom: Animalia
- Phylum: Chordata
- Class: Reptilia
- Clade: Dinosauria
- Clade: Saurischia
- Clade: †Sauropodomorpha
- Clade: †Sauropoda
- Clade: †Macronaria
- Clade: †Titanosauria
- Clade: †Eutitanosauria
- Superfamily: †Saltasauroidea (Powell, 1992); França et al., 2016

Genera
- †Baurutitan?; †Bustingorrytitan; †Diamantinasaurus?; †Isisaurus?; †Titanomachya; †Udelartitan; †Yeneen; †Aeolosaurini?; †Nemegtosauridae; †Saltasauridae

= Saltasauroidea =

Saltasauroids Temporal range: Late Cretaceous

Superfamily of dinosaurs

Saltasauroidea is a superfamily of titanosaurs named by França and colleagues in 2016 based on their phylogenetic results, for a clade uniting Aeolosaurini and Saltasauridae, as well as the intermediate genera Baurutitan, Diamantinasaurus and Isisaurus. The group was not discussed in the text, but was supported by Carballido and colleagues in 2022 as a useful designation for subdividing titanosaurs. As there was no discussion about the intentions for the clade, Carballido gave it the definition of all taxa closer to Saltasaurus than Patagotitan, encompassing half of Eutitanosauria as the sister taxon to the inversely defined Colossosauria. Carballido et al. placed Nemegtosauridae and Saltasauridae within the group, though they had Aeolosaurini within Colossosauria. The informal cladogram of titanosaur relationships they proposed is shown below.

- Titanosauria
  - Andesaurus
  - - Diamantinasaurus (Diamantinasauria)
    - Eutitanosauria
      - Saltasauroidea
        - Nemegtosaurus
        - Saltasauridae
          - Opisthocoelicaudia (Opisthocoelicaudiinae)
          - Saltasaurus (Saltasaurinae)
      - Colossosauria
        - Epachthosaurus
        - - Lognkosauria
            - Futalognkosaurus
            - - Mendozasaurus
              - Patagotitan
          - Rinconsauria
            - Rinconsaurus
            - - Muyelensaurus
              - Aeolosaurini
                - Gondwanatitan
                - Aeolosaurus
