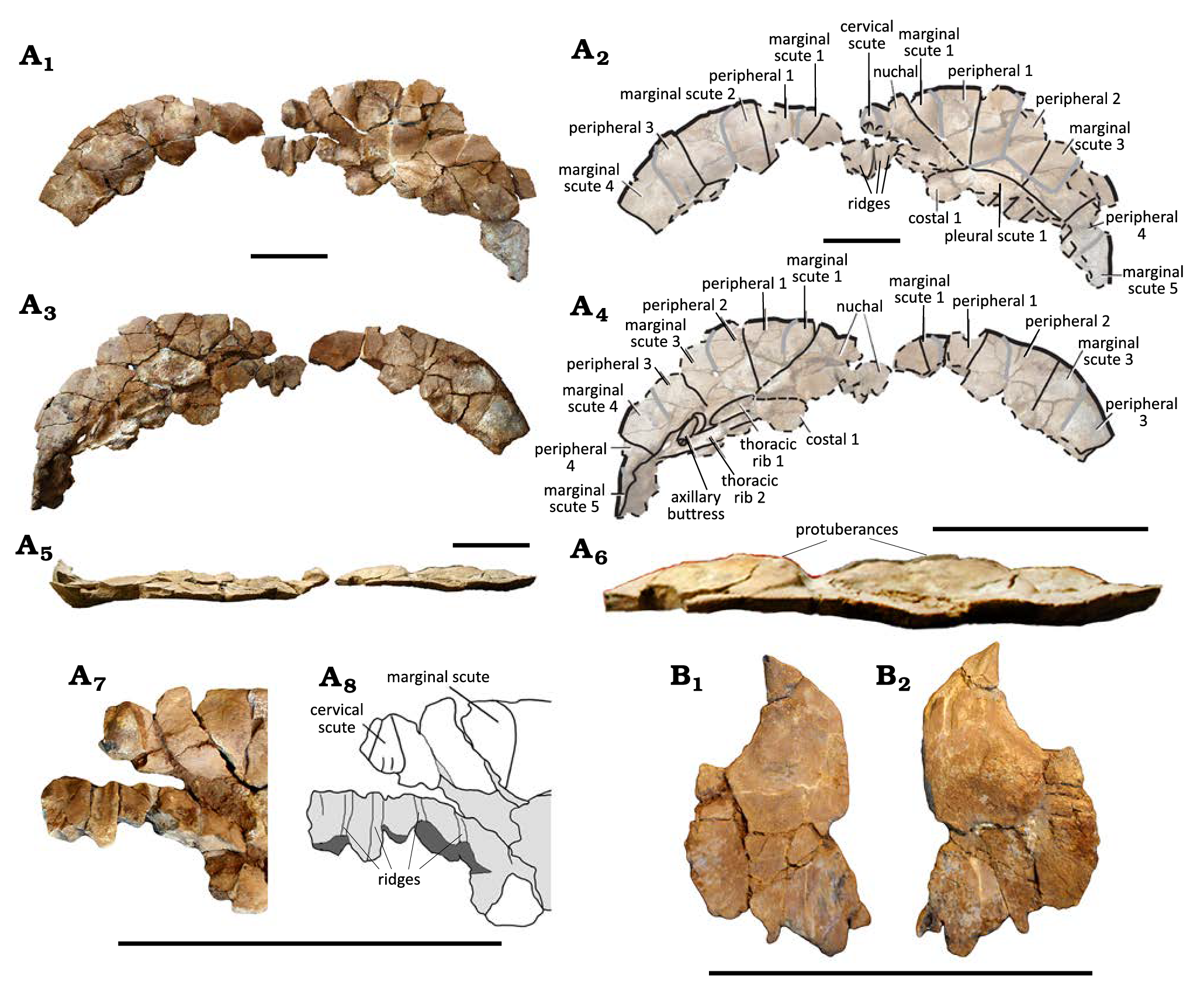
- Holotype shell fragments of P. aeschyli

Scientific classification
- Kingdom: Animalia
- Phylum: Chordata
- Class: Reptilia
- Clade: Pantestudines
- Clade: Testudinata
- Clade: †Meiolaniformes
- Genus: †Patagoniaemys; Sterli & de la Fuente, 2011

Type species
- †Patagoniaemys gasparinae Sterli & De la Fuente, 2011

Other species
- †Patagoniaemys aeschyli Agnolin et al., 2026

= Patagoniaemys =

Patagoniaemys Temporal range: Late Cretaceous, ~73–66 Ma

Extinct genus of turtles

Patagoniaemys is an extinct genus of stem turtle known from the late Cretaceous (Campanian to Maastrichtian age) of central Patagonia, Argentina. The genus contains two species: the type species, Patagoniaemys gasparinae, named in 2011, and a second species, Patagoniaemys aeschyli, named in 2026. It is a relatively large taxon with an oval-shaped carapace that has a large nuchal notch and many pits and grooves over its surface.

== Discovery ==
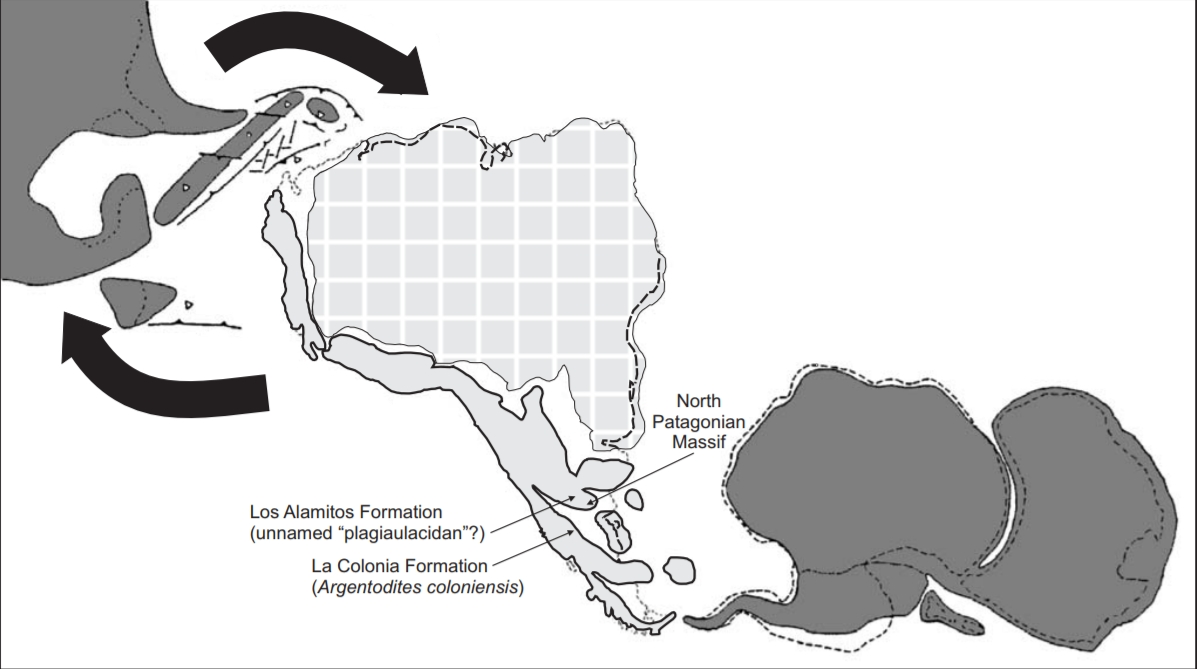
Paleogeographic map of Gondwana during the Late Cretaceous, showing the location of the La Colonia and Los Alamitos formations

The type specimen of P. gasparinae is known from skull fragments and several postcranial elements, including a nearly complete vertebral column. These fossils were found between the villages of Bajada Moreno and Bajada del Diablo on Buitre Chico Hill in Chubut Province, Argentina. They were recovered from outcrops of the La Colonia Formation. Later, several other nearly complete fossils of Patagoniaemys were discovered, making this genus the most complete meiolaniform turtle from the Cretaceous period known from the Gondwanan supercontinent.

Patagoniaemys was first named by Juliana Sterli and Marcelo S. de la Fuente in 2011. The genus name references the discovery of the taxon in Patagonia, combined with emys, the Greek word for turtles. The specific name honors Zulma Gasparini, a palaeontologist at the La Plata Museum in Argentina.

The second species of Patagoniaemys was recovered from the Cerro Cuadrado locality of the Los Alamitos Formation in Río Negro Province, Argentina. Known material includes parts of the carapace, vertebral column, skull, and humerus. Described by Agnolin et al. in 2026, the specific name aeschyli references Aeschylus, an ancient Greek writer said to have been killed by a tortoise dropped by an eagle which had mistaken his bald head for a rock suitable to shatter the tortoise's shell.

== Description ==
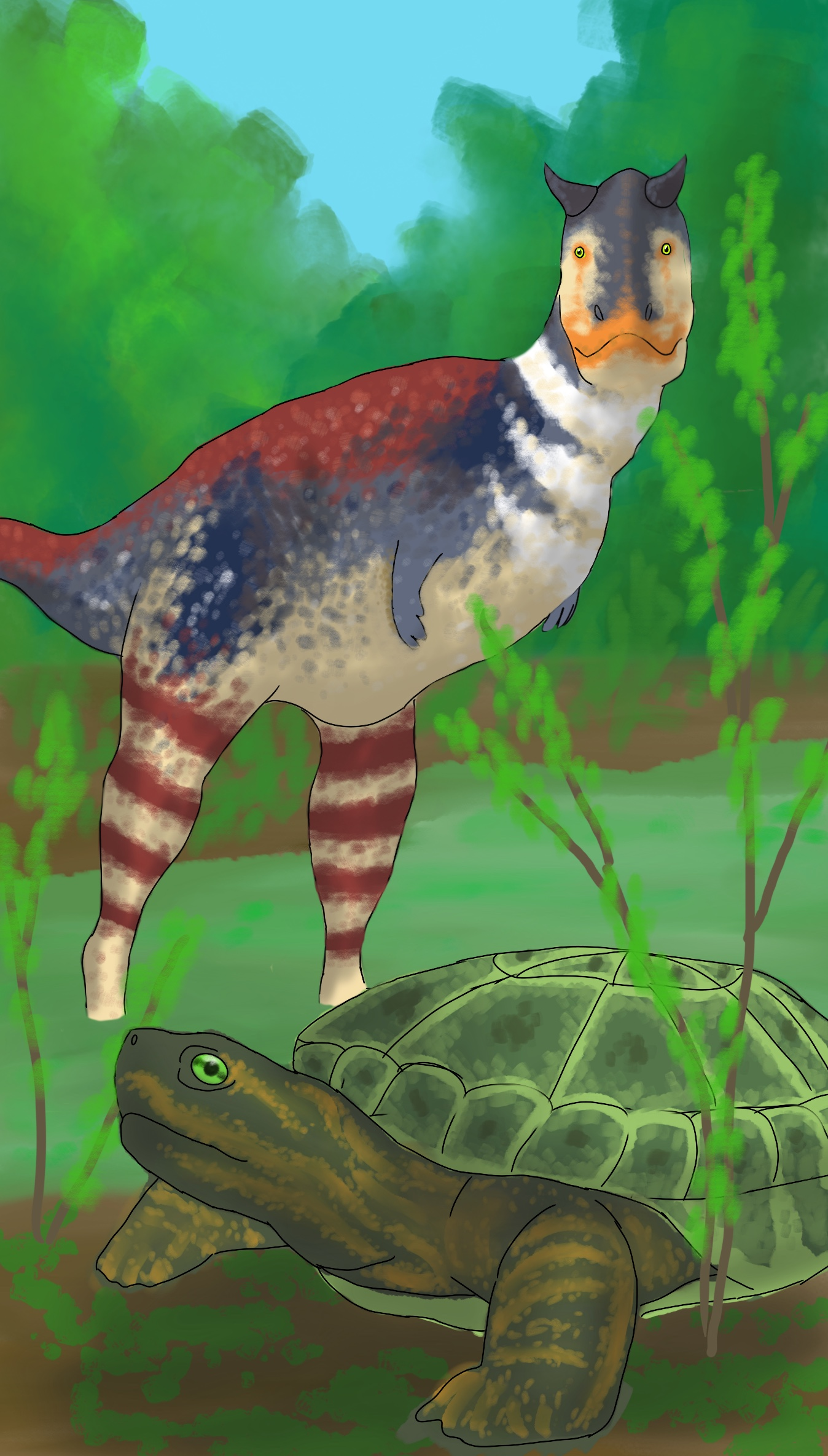
Restoration of P. gasparinae with the theropod dinosaur Carnotaurus in the background

Patagoniaemys is a relatively large genus of turtles, with P. gasparinae having a carapace length of 70 centimetres (28 in), and P. aeschyli having an estimated maximum carapace length of 80 cm (31 in). The skull and shell of this genus are ornamented with pits and irregular grooves. The carapace was oval-shaped and has a large nuchal notch resembling the general morphology of Mongolochelys efremovi.

Patagoniaemys can be distinguished from Otwayemys in the absence of the guttered bridge peripherals and the presence of anteriorly-bent costal.

== Classification ==
In their 2011 phylogenetic analysis, Sterli and De la Fuente recovered Patagoniaemys as the sister taxon to Otwayemys in a clade also including Mongolochelys. The sister clade to this group is the family Meiolaniidae.
