= Alamitophis =

Alamitophis Temporal range: Maastrichtian-Early Eocene ~70.6–48.6 Ma

Scientific classification
- Domain: Eukaryota
- Kingdom: Animalia
- Phylum: Chordata
- Class: Reptilia
- Order: Squamata
- Family: †Madtsoiidae
- Genus: †Alamitophis; Albino 1986

Type species
- Alamitophis argentinus Albino 1986

Species
- A. argentinus Albino 1986 (type); A. elongatus Albino 1994; A. tingamarra Scanlon 2005

Extinct genus of snakes

Alamitophis is a genus of fossil snakes in the extinct family of Madtsoiidae. Its length is estimated at 80 centimetres (2.6 ft) and it probably fed on frogs, lizards, and small mammals. It is found in Australia (Tingamarra Fauna, after which A. tingamarra is named) and Argentina (Allen, La Colonia and Los Alamitos Formations, after which the genus is named).
