= Museum of Paleontology Egidio Feruglio =

Museum in Trelew, Patagonia, Argentina

- MEF

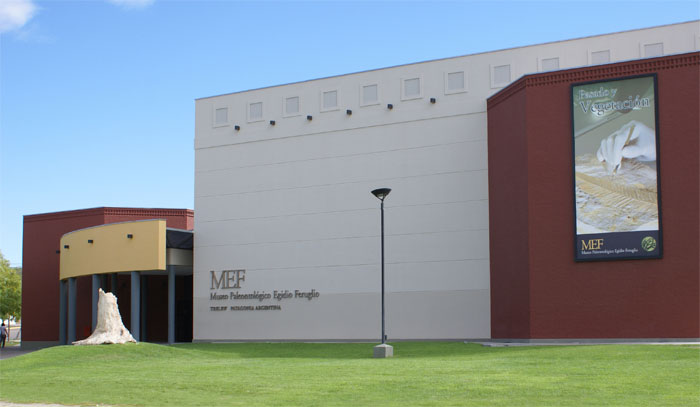
- MEF building
- Established: December 1990
- Location: Trelew, Patagonia (Argentina)
- Coordinates: 43.249312°S 65.3073172°W
- Collection size: More than 17,000 fossils
- Visitors: 70,000 (yearly average, last 5 years)
- Website: www.mef.org.ar

The Museum of Paleontology Egidio Feruglio (MEF, in Spanish: Museo Paleontológico Egidio Feruglio) is a science research and exhibition center in Trelew city, Patagonia, Argentina. Its permanent and travelling exhibitions focus on the fossil remains of fauna and flora of Patagonia, and the changes that affected the region over geological time. The museum is named for geologist Egidio Feruglio.

MEF is one of Argentina's main scientific institutions, with a robust research program in areas including vertebrate and invertebrate paleontology, paleobotany, and ichnology, and has a group focusing on plants in semi-desert environments.

== MEF exhibitions ==
MEF's permanent exhibition is a journey into the natural past of Patagonia. It begins about 10,000 years ago, with the first human settlements in the area. In each room, specimens from both terrestrial and marine life forms are shown for each geological period, up to the early Paleozoic. The Mesozoic hall depicting the giant dinosaurs of Patagonia is perhaps the most popular attraction in the museum. The journey goes on at the mini-theatre with a film showing the evolution of the Universe back to the Big Bang itself.

The exhibition also offers a view into MEF's largest, state-of-the-art preparation laboratory, where fossils are carefully cleaned and separated from the rock encasing them. Visitors can here witness the progress of actual work done on the most recent fossil findings.

The Mystery of the Jurassic, a BBC production featuring MEF scientists, is shown daily in the "Germán Sopeña" Auditorium.

The traveling exhibition featuring the "Dinosaurs of Patagonia" has visited many cities in Argentina and abroad. A recent European tour included Germany, Spain, Portugal, and the Czech Republic. Replicas of exhibits have been provided to museums in several countries.

== Bryn Gwyn Geopark ==
MEF also administers the Bryn Gwyn Geopark, a large natural geological reserve located 8 km South of Gaiman, and about 25 km from Trelew. The park is located on the slanted lands that separate the Chubut River valley from the higher Patagonian steppe. The trail exhibits typical fossils (both real and replicas) up to 40 million years old.

== Research ==
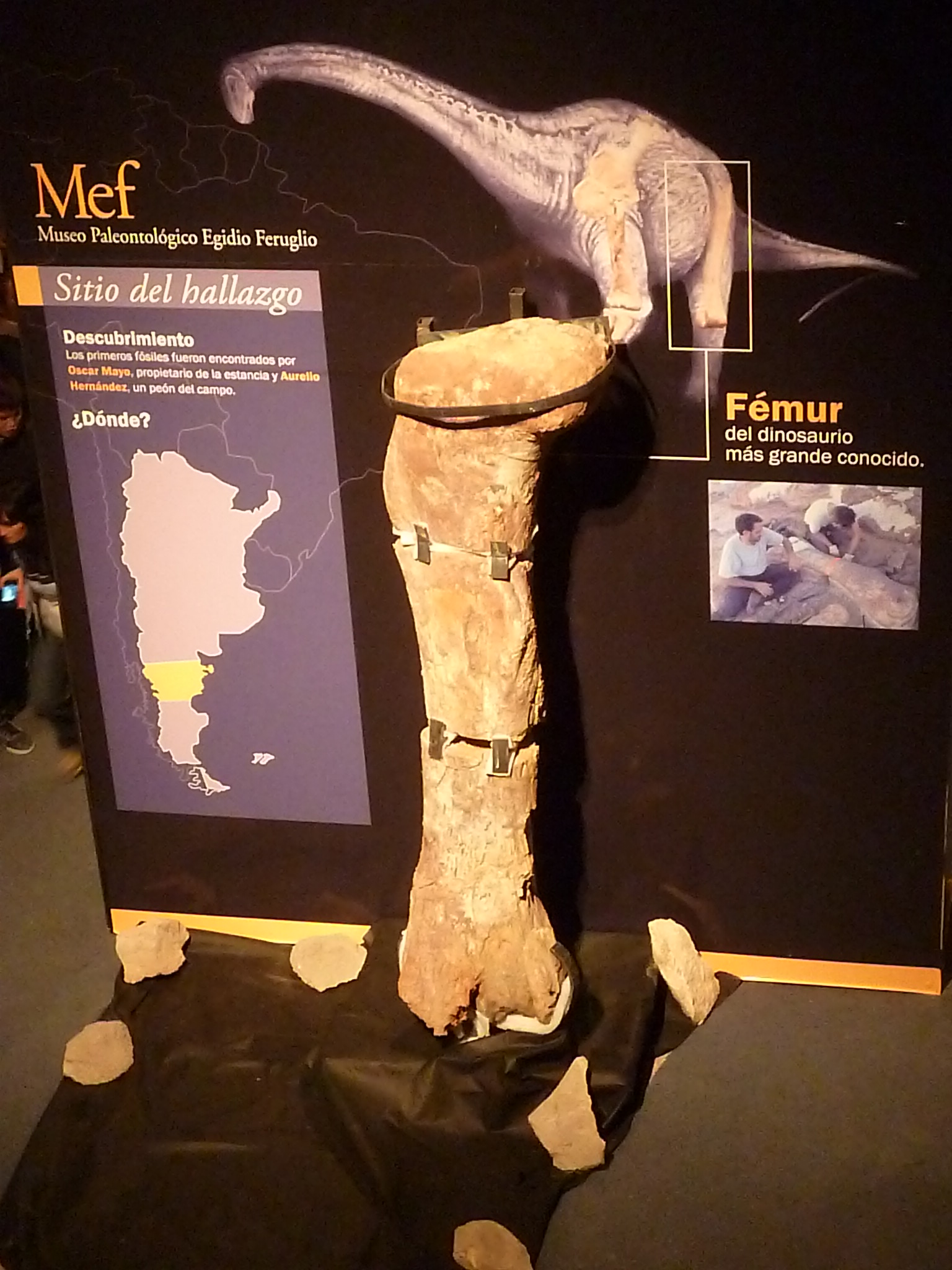
Patagotitan femur on display at the museum.

MEF is an "Associated Research Unit" to Argentina's National Research Council (CONICET), a qualification attained by very few local NGOs. Almost all of MEF researchers and postdoctoral fellows are CONICET career scientists.

The Museum's research area includes a collection which had more than 17,000 fossils in 2009, a preparation laboratory, and campaign equipment. It also has a workshop for making replicas of fossils, used for research and displayed in exhibitions.

== Expeditions ==
In 2014, a team of paleontologists from the museum excavated the remains in Patagonia of seven specimens of a titanosaur, Patagotitan mayorum, the largest dinosaur ever found. A replica of a 37-metre-long skeleton made by the museum is on display in the Natural History Museum in London, England from March 2023.

== Outreach and educational programs ==
The Museum's outreach department includes activities for families, schools and the global community. Some recent examples include:

- Open house: free admission and special activities during one weekend of June.
- Paleodesafío: a knowledge-based competition on Paleontology, Geology and Astronomy for secondary schools in the Chubut province.
- Explorers in Pyjamas: children spend the night in the Museum, playing, learning, and, finally, sleeping with the dinosaurs in the exhibition.
- Café Scientifique: a cup of coffee and an informal conversation with a scientist.

MEF scientists visit schools and advise teachers and students on related educational projects. The museum's website and Facebook page offer tourist information, non-technical articles, educational resources, etc.
