= Insular India =

Isolated land mass which became the Indian subcontinent

Insular India was an isolated landmass which became the Indian subcontinent. Across the latter stages of the Cretaceous and most of the Paleocene, following the breakup of Gondwana, the Indian subcontinent remained an isolated landmass as the Indian Plate drifted across the Tethys Ocean, forming the Indian Ocean. The process of India's separation from Madagascar first began 88 million years ago, but complete isolation only occurred towards the end of the Maastrichtian, a process that has been suggested to be the creation of the Deccan Traps. Soon after, the land mass moved northward rather quickly, until contact with Asia was established 55 million years ago. Even then, both landmasses did not become fully united until around 35 million years ago, and periods of isolation occurred as recently as 24 million years ago.

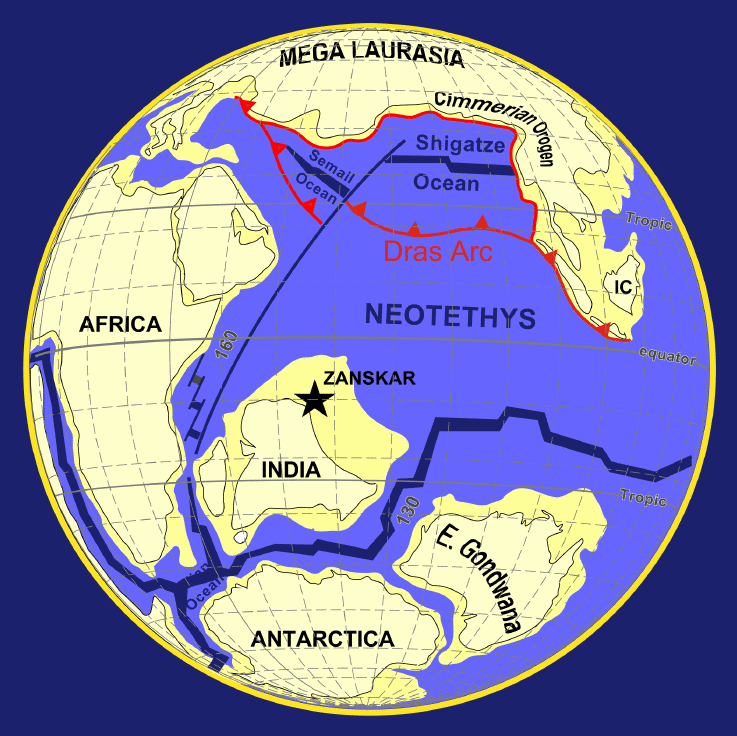
Plate tectonic reconstruction of the Tethys realm at 100 Mya; at the start of the Late Cretaceous. During the Late Jurassic, Gondwana began breaking up, eventually pushing Africa and India north across the Tethys and opening up the Indian Ocean

Thus, for a period of 53 million years India retained a degree of isolation, 11 of which it was a complete island continent. This allowed its local biota to follow the typical patterns seen in islands and diversify in unique ways, much as in modern Madagascar, its sister landmass. Faunal interchanges with other landmasses, like Africa and Europe (then an archipelago of islands across the Tethys) occurred during this period, and a considerable Asian influence can already be seen long before contact was made. This rendered India rather peculiar as not just an isolated continent but also a "stepping stone" in the dispersal of many animal and plant clades across Africa, Europe, Madagascar, Asia and possibly even Oceania. Still, several "archaic" clades managed to survive. The vast majority of India's terrestrial vertebrate life was wiped out in the Cretaceous-Paleogene extinction event; only 3 extant tetrapod lineages can trace their ancestry to Cretaceous India. Most of India's few other surviving Gondwanan lineages were outcompeted during the Paleogene by newly-arriving lineages. However, plants and invertebrate fauna were less affected.

During the Paleogene, dispersing tetrapod lineages from Asia repopulated India, with some, such as lagomorphs, evolving on the continent. By the time full contact was established, a large percentage of India's old and new indigenous fauna had been outcompeted by Eurasian species. However, several groups like lagomorphs have become widespread across the world, as have floral groups such as dipterocarps, which went on to become dominant tree species throughout much of tropical Asia. A significant portion of Asian mantises also originated on Insular India. The islands of the Seychelles still retain an indigenous herpetofauna, presumably an echo of the amphibian and reptile species seen in India as an island.

== Geology ==
The Burma terrane or West Burma block, an isolated island arc that was present in the Tethys Sea during the Cretaceous, collided with Insular India during the Paleocene and was pushed northwards, eventually colliding with mainland Asia independent of Insular India's own collision. Much of western Myanmar consists of the former Burma Terrane.

== Cretaceous fauna ==
The Cretaceous fauna of India is well attested in both Coniacian and Maastrichtian aged sites such as the Lameta Formation. Generally speaking, the local dinosaurian and crocodilian fauna is almost identical to that of Madagascar, with clades like abelisaurids, titanosaurs, noasaurids and notosuchians being well represented here. A possible deviation is the presence of stegosaurs, like Dravidosaurus and Brachypodosaurus, the last remaining members of this lineage; if these aren't misidentified remains of herbivorous notosuchians and sauropods, then these relics would be the only indigenous ornithischians in the entire Indo-Malagasy landmass. Confirmed ankylosaur remains dating as far back as the Jurassic have been unearthed in India too. Another possible deviation is the presence of a troodontid, a lineage more typically associated with Laurasia and thus possibly indicating interchange with Europe or even mainland Asia, but these remains are controversial and could belong either other theropods or notosuchians. Indeterminate fossils of ornithopods belonging to hypsilophodontids and iguanodontids have been unearthed in India.

The mammalian fauna of India also bears similarities with that of Madagascar, with the gondwanathere Bharattherium, one of the most common mammals, being extremely similar to the malagasy Lavanify. The most diverse mammals in the Maastrichtian of India are eutherians, a clade normally associated with northern continents and also found in Madagascar in this epoch, which combined with their ambiguous phylogenetic positions renders them extremely important in the understanding of placental evolution. Some like Deccanolestes have been variously interpreted as euarchontans, adapisoriculids, or stem-afrotherians, though the general consensus appears to be that they are non-placental eutherians and that there are no known Cretaceous placentals. Kharmerungulatum, formerly interpreted as a stem-ungulate, is now known to be a representative of Zhelestidae, a herbivorous non-placental eutherian clade. Regardless of the phylogenetics of these eutherians, they almost certainly reached India and Madagascar through either Europe, Africa or mainland Asia; later they would propagate across Gondwana as far west as Brazil.

Probably the most spectacular representative of India's Cretaceous fauna is Avashishta, a late surviving haramiyid and the last known non-mammalian synapsid. Non-gondwanathere multituberculates and meridiolestidans can probably also be inferred as having lived in India during this epoch, due to the former's presence in all landmasses including Madagascar and the latter being the dominant mammals in other known Gondwanan sites. An eutriconodont, Indotriconodon magnus, is also known, extending the range of this clade into the Late Cretaceous and the southern continents.

The herpetofauna of India in the Cretaceous is a mosaic of indigenous groups and forms that rafted their way from Asia. Neobatrachians are an indigenous clade and locally well represented as they are in Madagascar in the form of ranids, hylids, leptodactylids, pelobatids and discoglossids, as are madtsoiid snakes like Sanajeh and possibly Indophis and iguanian lizards, while anguids are from Laurasia. Caecillians are an indigenous Gondwanan clade, but their absence in Madagascar suggests that the Asian species have descended from African species that colonized India as it drifted north. The divergence between African and Asian groups has been estimated at 120 million years ago, indicating that this likely happened during the Cretaceous.

Several fish taxa are known from estuarine locales; most are marine species, but there are also forms like lepisosteids, which do also occur in Africa but are otherwise rare in Gondwanan landmasses. Cichlids and other forms suspected of having had an Indian Gondwanan origin were most likely present.

=== Effects of the Cretaceous-Paleogene extinction event ===
The Cretaceous-Paleogene extinction event had a particularly catastrophic effect in India, wiping out almost all terrestrial vertebrate lineages on the continent. It is thought that the effects of the Deccan Traps volcanism may have compounded the extinction event's impacts, making it especially devastating there. Only three extant tetrapod groups have representatives that can be verified as descending from Gondwanan endemics of Insular India: one family of frogs (Nasikabatrachidae), several families of caecilians (Grandisoniidae, Chikilidae and Ichthyophiidae), and 1 family of blindsnakes (Gerrhopilidae). Notably, all three lineages have a fossorial mode of life, indicating that this lifestyle may have saved them from the extinction's impacts. Several mammal genera also survived the event, although they went extinct during the Paleocene.

Invertebrate fauna, especially soil invertebrates such as centipedes, were likely less affected by the extinction, and several lineages that persist today are thought to have Gondwanan ancestry. The Parreysiinae, a subfamily of the freshwater mussel family Unionidae, are thought to have originated in East Gondwana during the Jurassic, and survived on both Africa and Insular India throughout the Cretaceous. Several different tribes (Indochinellini, Lamellidentini, and Parreysiini) of the Parreysiinae evolved in isolation on Insular India. These endemic tribes managed to survive the K-Pg extinction, and colonized mainland Asia via both Insular India and the Burma terrane, the latter of which collided with and was pushed north by Insular India during the Paleogene. They are now found throughout much of India and Southeast Asia. Similarly, numerous lineages of mantises (clade Cernomantodea) are thought to have originated on the Antarctic-Indian landmass after the breakup of Gondwana, and persisted on Insular India after it broke away. This massive diversity of mantises survived the K-Pg extinction and invaded mainland Asia following the collision of Insular India with Asia.

== Paleogene fauna ==
Following the near-total extirpation of vertebrate life from India during the K-Pg extinction, India's vertebrate fauna was successively rebuilt by dispersing lineages primarily from Asia, first over water during its period of isolation, and later via land when it collided with Asia. Some of India's surviving tetrapod Gondwanan vertebrate lineages were outcompeted by these new arrivals.

It was previously thought that several major families of Neobatrachia (Ranidae, Dicroglossidae, Rhacophoridae) originated in India from an ancestor that colonized the continent from Africa during the Cretaceous. This was supported by closely related families (Nyctibatrachidae, Ranixalidae, Micrixalidae) being endemic to India. However, more recent studies hypothesize that these families have a mainland Asian origin and colonized India during the Paleogene.

=== Paleocene fauna ===
The fossil record of the Paleocene of India, when the continent was a fully isolated landmass, is dubious and thus most inferrals about its fauna are somewhat speculative. It is known for certain that Deccanolestes and Bharattherium survived the K-Pg event, though for how further long did non-placental eutherians and gondwanatheres live in India is unknown, and by the time the landmass makes contact with Asia they are most likely extinct.

During this epoch, unambiguous placental mammals make their way into India in spite of its isolation, probably by rafting like the many placental groups in Madagascar, or perhaps brief connections with Africa and Europe (the latter still an archipelago). Hyaenodonts are an endemic African clade, first showing outside of the continent in the Paleocene of India and Europe. Glires evolved in Asia, but a lineage became isolated in India, where it gave rise to the lagomorphs.

For a while it was theorised that ostriches evolved in India during this epoch, under the assumption that European ratites like Palaeotis represented recent Asiatic migrations. However, the first unambiguous ostriches are now thought to have evolved in Africa, with eogruiids having occupied their ecological niche in Asia; likewise, European ratites are now thought to be among the oldest known, and probably evolved independently there, being unrelated to ostriches. Still, India probably had a thriving paleognath fauna; the volant ancestors of kiwis and elephant birds presumably flew from there to Oceania and Madagascar respectively, while the mysterious Hypselornis may represent an indigenous clade.

=== Eocene fauna ===
By this time India already has an extensive placental fauna (as well as metatherians like Indodelphis), but in its isolation there are still high degrees of endemism, with some clades like anthracobunids not being found elsewhere. A study on Cambaytherium suggests that Perissodactyla might have had an insular origin in India. The most notable endemic mammals are cetaceans, which are in fact restricted to the Indian Subcontinent until the evolution of the marine "protocetids". Eocene India is also rich in bat remains, including many representatives of modern groups, though its unclear if this Indian chiropteran fauna represents an adaptive radiation or simply that bat fossils elsewhere are rare.

During this time, lagomorphs and hyaenodonts disperse out of India, establishing their cosmopolitan ranges.

The Gecarcinucidae, a family of freshwater crabs widespread throughout much of tropical Asia, is thought to have originated in India, despite not being of ancient Gondwanan origins themselves. Divergence estimates indicate that the Gecarcinucidae originate from Southeast Asian ancestors that dispersed to Insular India and diverged there during the middle Eocene, before India collided with Asia. As India drifted northwards, it may have come into close enough proximity to Southeast Asia to allow for dispersing lineages to colonize it. Notably, as the Gecarcinucidae are a freshwater group that could not disperse via marine habitats, this indicates that temporary land bridges may have formed in the Eocene between India and Southeast Asia, allowing for the dispersal of freshwater organisms to India while it was still isolated. Following the India-Asia collision, the Gecarcinucidae dispersed back into mainland Asia.

The giant madtsoiid snake Vasuki indicus was likely the apex predator of this time and environment.

== Flora ==
The Dipterocarpoideae, the largest subfamily of the Dipterocarpaceae, is thought to originate from ancestors that dispersed from Africa to India during the Late Cretaceous. Surviving the K-Pg extinction event, the Dipterocarpoideae were isolated on Insular India (aside from some representatives in the Seychelles) until India's collision with Asia, after which they migrated out of the continent and diversified. The Dipterocarpaceae are now among the most widespread and dominant tree groups in tropical Asia. Fossil evidence indicates that the other subfamily of Dipterocarpaceae, the Monotoideae (presently found in Africa, Madagasar, and South America), also colonized India and was present until the Eocene, but ultimately went extinct in India and thus did not disperse to other parts of Asia.
