= Lavanify =

Lavanify Temporal range: Late Cretaceous (?Maastrichtian)

Scientific classification
- Kingdom: Animalia
- Phylum: Chordata
- Class: Mammalia
- Family: †Sudamericidae
- Genus: †Lavanify; Krause et al., 1997
- Species: †L. miolaka

Binomial name
- †Lavanify miolaka Krause et al., 1997

Mammalian genus from the late Cretaceous

Lavanify is a mammalian genus from the late Cretaceous (probably Maastrichtian, about 71 to 66 million years ago) of Madagascar. The only species, L. miolaka, is known from two isolated teeth, one of which is damaged. The teeth were collected in 1995–1996 and described in 1997. The animal is classified as a member of Gondwanatheria, an enigmatic extinct group with unclear phylogenetic relationships, and within Gondwanatheria as a member of the family Sudamericidae. Lavanify is most closely related to the Indian Bharattherium; the South American Sudamerica and Gondwanatherium are more distantly related. Gondwanatheres probably ate hard plant material.

Lavanify had high-crowned, curved teeth. One of the two teeth is 11.2 mm high and shows a deep furrow and, is centered laterally in the crown, a V-shaped area that consists of dentine. The other, damaged, tooth is 9.8 mm high and has at least one deep cavity (infundibulum). Characters shared by the teeth of Lavanify and Bharattherium include the presence of an infundibulum and a furrow; they both also have large, continuous bands of matrix (unbundled hydroxyapatite crystals) between the prisms (bundles of hydroxyapatite crystals) of the enamel, and perikymata—wave-like ridges and grooves in the enamel surface.

== Discovery and context ==
Two teeth of Lavanify were discovered in 1995–1996 during joint expeditions of the State University of New York, Stony Brook University, and the University of Antananarivo to the late Cretaceous (mostly Maastrichtian, about 71 to 66 million years ago [mya]) Maevarano Formation of northwestern Madagascar. The two teeth were found in different sites in a white sandstone unit of the Maevarano Formation near the village of Berivotra and have been deposited in the collections of the University of Antananarivo (specimen UA 8653) and Field Museum of Natural History (specimen FMNH PM 59520). David W. Krause and colleagues described Lavanify and a sudamericid from India, which they did not name, in a 1997 paper in Nature. These were the first gondwanathere mammals to be found outside of Argentina and provided evidence that the mammal faunas of the different Gondwanan (southern) continents were similar to each other. The generic name, Lavanify, means "long tooth" and the specific name, miolaka, means "curved" in Malagasy; both refer to the teeth's shape.

Gondwanatheres are a small group of mammals of uncertain phylogenetic affinities known from the late Cretaceous to the Eocene (~56–34 mya) of the Gondwanan continents, known only from teeth and a few lower jaws. Upon their discovery in the 1980s, gondwanatheres were initially thought to be xenarthrans—part of the same group as living sloths, armadillos, and anteaters—but later workers have favored affinities with multituberculates (a diverse group of fossil mammals) or left the relationships of the gondwanatheres open. The group comprises two families. The family Ferugliotheriidae, whose members had low-crowned teeth, occurs in the Campanian (~84–71 mya) to Maastrichtian of Argentina. All other gondwanatheres, including Lavanify, are placed in the Sudamericidae, which have high-crowned (hypsodont) teeth. These include Gondwanatherium from the Campanian and Maastrichtian of Argentina; Sudamerica from the Paleocene (~66–56 mya) of Argentina; Lavanify; at least one species from the Maastrichtian of India; an unnamed species related to Sudamerica from the Eocene of Antarctica; and an unnamed possible gondwanathere, TNM 02067, from the Cretaceous of Tanzania. In 2007, teams led by G.P. Wilson and G.V.R. Prasad independently described this animal as Dakshina and Bharattherium respectively; as the latter name was published first, it is the correct name for this genus according to the Principle of Priority. Gondwanatheres have been interpreted as feeding on roots, bark, and abrasive vegetation or as the earliest grass-eating mammals.

Several other mammals have been recorded from the late Cretaceous of Madagascar, mostly on the basis of isolated teeth. A possible second gondwanathere is represented by a tooth that is larger and lower-crowned than those of Lavanify, and a yet lower-crowned tooth may also be of a gondwanathere. A lower molar, UA 8699, may be of a marsupial or a placental and a molar fragment is referable to Multituberculata. Finally, an as-yet-undescribed mammal is known from a fairly complete skeleton. None of these mammals is related to the living mammals of the island, many of which belong to unique groups (see List of mammals of Madagascar). The fauna also contains crocodyliforms, dinosaurs, and other animals.

== Description ==
Lavanify is known from the complete cheektooth UA 8653 and the broken tooth FMNH PM 59520. Krause and colleagues could not determine whether the teeth were from the lower or upper jaw and whether they were molars or molariform (molar-like) premolars, but suggested that they represented two different tooth positions. However, Wilson and colleagues in 2007 tentatively identified UA 8653 as a left fourth (last) lower molariform (mf4); because molars and premolars of gondwanatheres cannot be reliably distinguished, the term "molariform" is used instead. FMNH PM 59520 resembles the Gondwanatherium fossil MACN Pv-RN 1027, a broken tooth that may be an upper molariform. In both Lavanify teeth, the enamel surface features perikymata (ridges and grooves arranged in a transverse, wave-like pattern).

UA 8653, the holotype, is hypsodont and curved. It is 11.2 mm high, of which the crown makes up about 85%, and the dimensions of its crown are 3.4 x 3.2 mm. The occlusal (chewing) surface is worn flat and contains a V-shaped island of dentine surrounded by enamel. One side of the crown lacks enamel. Between the two arms of the V, at the lingual (inner) side of the tooth, is a furrow filled with cementum, which extends all the way through the tooth; the presence of such a long furrow distinguishes it from Gondwanatherium. The enamel is made up of small, round prisms (bundles of hydroxyapatite crystals) that are separated by large, continuous bands of interprismatic matrix (IPM; the material between the enamel prisms).

FMNH PM 59520 is 9.8 mm high. It is similar in many respects to UA 8653, but is less curved and its occlusal surface contains a large infundibulum (funnel-shaped cavity), filled with cementum and surrounded by enamel that penetrates deeply into the tooth. There is also either a second infundibulum or a cementum-filled furrow. The differences in degree of curvature and occlusal morphology suggest that this tooth represents a different tooth position than UA 8653. Krause and colleagues tentatively placed this tooth in Lavanify in view of the considerable variation among other gondwanathere teeth of a single species and in the absence of evidence to the contrary.

== Relationships ==
- - Ferugliotheriidae
  - Sudamericidae
    - Gondwanatherium
    - - Sudamerica
      - - Lavanify
        - Bharattherium

Relationships among gondwanatheres

In their original description, Krause and colleagues suggested that Lavanify was most closely related to the then-unnamed Indian sudamericid. They based this proposed relationship on the shared presence of prominent, continuous bands of IPM. The teams who named the Indian gondwanathere in 2007 both agreed with this proposed relationship. In their description of Dakshina, Wilson and colleagues added the presence of an infundibulum and of perikymata to the evidence for the relationship between the two. These three characters are synapomorphies (shared derived traits) for the Bharattherium-Lavanify clade. They also share the presence of furrows on the lingual side of the teeth only, but whether this is a derived feature is uncertain. Wilson and colleagues list two autapomorphies (unique derived traits) of Lavanify: presence of a V-shaped dentine island and absence of enamel on one side of the crown. Prasad and colleagues who named Bharattherium, noted the absence of enamel on part of the crown of a Bharattherium tooth and interpreted this trait as a synapomorphy of Bharattherium and Lavanify. They also mentioned the presence of a furrow and infundibulum as shared traits.

== Literature cited ==
- Gurovich, Y. 2005. Bio-evolutionary aspects of Mesozoic mammals: description, phylogenetic relationships and evolution of the Gondwanatheria (Late Cretaceous and Paleocene of Gondwana). Ph.D. thesis, Universidad de Buenos Aires, xiii + 546 pp.
- Gurovich, Y. and Beck, R. 2009. The phylogenetic affinities of the enigmatic mammalian clade Gondwanatheria (subscription required). Journal of Mammalian Evolution 16:25–49.
- Krause, D.W., Prasad, G.V.R., von Koenigswald, W., Sahni, A. and Grine, F.E. 1997. Cosmopolitanism among gondwanan Late Cretaceous mammals (subscription required). Nature 390:504–507.
- Krause, D.W., O'Connor, P.M., Rogers, K.C., Sampson, S.D., Buckley, G.A. and Rogers, R.R. 2006. Late Cretaceous terrestrial vertebrates from Madagascar: Implications for Latin American biogeography (subscription required). Annals of the Missouri Botanical Garden 93(2):178–208.
- Prasad, G.V.R. 2008. "Sedimentary basins & fossil records" (PDF). Archived from the original (PDF) on 26 July 2011. Pp. 90–96 in Singhvi, A.K. and Bhattacharya, A. (eds.). Glimpses of Geoscience Research in India: The Indian Report to IUGS 2004–2008. New Delhi: The Indian National Science Academy (INSA).
- Prasad, G.V.R., Verma, O., Sahni, A., Krause, D.W., Khosla, A. and Parmar, V. 2007. A new late Cretaceous gondwanatherian mammal from central India. Proceedings of the Indian National Science Academy 73(1):17–24.
- Wilson, G.P., Das Sarma, D.C. and Anantharaman, S. 2007. Late Cretaceous sudamericid gondwanatherians from India with paleobiogeographic considerations of Gondwanan mammals (subscription required). Journal of Vertebrate Paleontology 27(2):521–531.
