= Bharattherium =

Bharattherium Temporal range: Maastrichtian Late Cretaceous (Maastrichtian) and Paleocene

Scientific classification
- Kingdom: Animalia
- Phylum: Chordata
- Class: Mammalia
- Family: †Sudamericidae
- Genus: †Bharattherium; Prasad et al., 2007
- Species: †B. bonapartei

Binomial name
- †Bharattherium bonapartei Prasad et al., 2007

Synonyms
- Dakshina jederi Wilson et al., 2007

Early mammal known from Cretaceous fossils in India

Bharattherium is a mammal that lived in India during the Maastrichtian (latest Cretaceous) and possibly the Paleocene. The genus has a single species, Bharattherium bonapartei. It is part of the gondwanathere family Sudamericidae, which is also found in Madagascar and South America during the latest Cretaceous. The first fossil of Bharattherium was discovered in 1989 and published in 1997, but the animal was not named until 2007, when two teams independently named the animal Bharattherium bonapartei and Dakshina jederi. The latter name is now a synonym. Bharattherium is known from a total of eight isolated fossil teeth, including one incisor and seven molariforms (molar-like teeth, either premolars or true molars).

Bharattherium molariforms are high, curved teeth, with a height of 6 to 8.5 millimetres (0.24 to 0.33 in). In a number of teeth tentatively identified as fourth lower molariforms (mf4), there is a large furrow on one side and a deep cavity (infundibulum) in the middle of the tooth. Another tooth, perhaps a third lower molariform, has two furrows on one side and three infundibula on the other. The tooth enamel has traits that have been interpreted as protecting against cracks in the teeth. The hypsodont (high-crowned) teeth of sudamericids like Bharattherium are reminiscent of later grazing mammals, and the discovery of grass in Indian fossil sites contemporaneous with those yielding Bharattherium suggest that sudamericids were indeed grazers.

== Taxonomy ==
A gondwanathere tooth, catalogued as VPL/JU/NKIM/25, (Note: This tooth is stored in the collection of mammals from the Naskal fossil site in the Vertebrate Palaeontology Laboratory at the University of Jammu, numbered 25.) was first discovered in the Maastrichtian (latest Cretaceous, about 70–66 million years ago) Intertrappean Beds of Naskal, India, in 1989, but it was not identified as such until another gondwanathere, Lavanify, was found on Madagascar in the middle 1990s. The discoveries of Lavanify and VPL/JU/NKIM/25 were announced in Nature in 1997. Gondwanatheres were previously known only from Argentina; these discoveries extended the range of the gondwanathere family Sudamericidae across the continents of the ancient supercontinent of Gondwana.

In 2007, two teams of scientists independently named the Indian gondwanathere on the basis of new material; both teams included VPL/JU/NKIM/25 in their newly named species. Guntupalli Prasad and colleagues named the animal Bharattherium bonapartei on the basis of an additional tooth, VPL/JU/IM/33, (Note: This tooth is stored in the collection of mammals from the Intertrappean Beds in the collections of Jammu University's Vertebrate Palaeontology Laboratory, numbered 33.) from another Intertrappean locality, Kisalpuri. The generic name, Bharattherium, combines Bharat, Sanskrit for "India", with the Ancient Greek therion, meaning "beast", and the specific name, bonapartei, honors Argentine paleontologist José Bonaparte, who was the first to describe a gondwanathere fossil. G.P. Wilson and colleagues named Dakshina jederi on the basis of six teeth (in addition to VPL/JU/NKIM 25), and identified some additional material as indeterminate gondwanatheres. Of these teeth, three (GSI/SR/PAL-G059, (Note: Like the others described by Wilson and colleagues, this tooth is stored in the collections of the Palaeontology Division of the Southern Region of the Geological Survey of India.) G070, and G074) are from a third Intertrappean site at Gokak and three (GSI/SR/PAL-N071, N210, and N212) are from Naskal. Dakshina, the generic name, derives from Sanskrit daakshinaatya "of the south", and refers both to the animal's occurrence in southern India and to the distribution of gondwanatheres in the southern continents. The specific name, jederi, honors University of Michigan paleontologist Jeffrey A. Wilson, nicknamed "Jeder", who played an important role in the project that led to the discovery of Dakshina. Wilson and colleagues also described three other gondwanathere teeth from Gokak (GSI/SR/PAL-G111, G112, and G211), which they tentatively identified as a different species of gondwanathere on their small size. In 2008, Prasad commented that Bharattherium bonapartei and Dakshina jederi represented the same species and that Bharattherium, which was published first, was the correct name.

== Description ==
Known remains of Bharattherium
Fossil	Locality	Tooth position	References
GSI/SR/PAL-G059	Gokak	Left mf3	
GSI/SR/PAL-G070	Gokak	Right mf4	
GSI/SR/PAL-G074	Gokak	Right mf4	
VPL/JU/IM/33	Kisalpuri	Molariform	
GSI/SR/PAL-N071	Naskal	Left mf4	
GSI/SR/PAL-N210	Naskal	Left i1	
GSI/SR/PAL-N212	Naskal	Right mf4	
VPL/JU/NKIM/25	Naskal	Left mf4	

Bharattherium bonapartei is known from a total of eight isolated teeth. Among the seven teeth in their sample, Wilson and colleagues tentatively identified five as fourth lower molariforms (mf4)—because gondwanathere premolars and molars cannot be distinguished, they are collectively known as "molariforms"—one as a third lower molariform (mf3) and one as a lower incisor (i1). These determinations were made on the basis of comparisons with a sample of the South American gondwanathere Sudamerica ameghinoi, in which all eight molariform positions are known. However, the large number of mf4s led Wilson and colleagues to suspect that the criteria used for distinguishing Sudamerica tooth positions may not apply directly to Bharattherium. Prasad and colleagues did not assign their two Bharattherium teeth to any tooth position, but suggested that they may represent different tooth positions and that one may come from the upper and the other from the lower side of the jaw. As is characteristic of sudamericids, Bharattherium molariforms are hypsodont (high-crowned) and have a flat occlusal (chewing) surface atop a high tooth, with furrows that extend down the height of the tooth. Bharattherium molariforms are the smallest of any sudamericid; those of Lavanify, for example, are about 35% larger. Unlike Sudamerica molariforms, those of Bharattherium taper towards the top.

=== Molariforms ===
GSI/SR/PAL-G074, a well-preserved right mf4 that Wilson and colleagues selected as the holotype of Dakshina jederi, is 7.57 mm high and has a crown of 3.66 × 2.99 mm. It is curved, with the base more distal (towards the back) than the top. The occlusal surface is rectangular. On the lingual side (towards the tongue), there is a deep furrow (filled in part with cementum) that extends from the top to near the base of the tooth. There is also a much smaller indentation on the buccal side (towards the cheeks). The occlusal surface is mostly covered with enamel surrounding a dentine lake, but there is a V-shaped islet in the middle, with the tip of the V towards the lingual side, that forms the remnant of an infundibulum—a deep cavity in the tooth. Perikymata—wave-like bands and grooves—are visible in the enamel.

The right mf4 GSI/SR/PAL-G070, which is damaged on the buccal, distal, and lingual sides, is 8.40 mm high, but has an occlusal surface of only 2.49 × 1.75 mm. Unlike in GSI/SR/PAL-G074, the dentine on the occlusal surface is not exposed, and the occlusal surface is oval in shape. Furthermore, the V-shaped islet is larger and the lingual furrow is less prominent at the occlusal surface, because it tapers near the tip of the tooth. In the heavily damaged left mf4 GSI/SR/PAL-N071 (height 7.16 mm), only the distal side is well preserved. The infundibulum is exposed internally; it extends 4.01 mm down the crown. The occlusal surface is poorly preserved, but its dimensions are at least 2.14 × 2.42 mm. GSI/SR/PAL-N212, a right mf4, is damaged on the mesial side and has a height of 5.86 mm and an occlusal surface of at least 2.66 x 2.04 mm. Cementum fills the V-shaped islet.

VPL/JU/NKIM/25 was the first Indian gondwanathere fossil to be described; it is damaged on one side. Wilson and colleagues identified it as a left mf4 (implying that the damaged side is buccal) with strong similarities to GSI/SR/PAL-G070, including a curved crown and a V-shaped enamel islet atop a deep infundibulum. The occlusal surface is oval. The tooth is 6 mm high and Wilson and colleagues estimate that the occlusal surface is 2.5 × 1.8 mm, close to the dimensions of GSI/SR/PAL-G070. They suggest the tooth probably had enamel on all sides of the crown, but Prasad and colleagues point to a possible enamel-dentine junction on the damaged side as evidence that enamel may be absent there.

GSI/SR/PAL-G059, identified as a left mf3, has a height of 5.97 mm at the mesial side, but only 2.02 mm at the distal side because of curvature. On the lingual side, two long furrows are visible, and on the buccal side breakage exposes three long infundibula, of which the most mesial one is the longest and the most distal one the shortest. In the occlusal surface, these three infundibula merge into a single islet. In addition, three dentine lakes are visible in the occlusal surface, which has dimensions of 4.58 × at least 2.52 mm. Although in Sudamerica, mf2, mf3, and the upper molariforms MF3 and MF4 all have three lophs, like GSI/SR/PAL-G059, its curvature matches the mf3 of Sudamerica best.

VPL/JU/IM/33, the holotype of Bharattherium bonapartei, is 7.33 mm high, 2.66 mm long, and 2.0 mm wide. The occlusal surface is about rectangular and is mostly covered by a V-shaped dentine lake, which encloses a small heart-shaped enamel islet at the top of an cementum-filled infundibulum. A vertical furrow is also present. Near the top of the tooth, enamel covers the entire crown, but further down there is no enamel on the concave face of the tooth.

=== Incisor ===
The left i1 GSI/SR/PAL-N210 is flat on the medial side (towards the middle of the head) but convex on the lateral side (towards the side of the head) and bears a shallow groove on the lateral side. At the base, the tooth is broadest on the lower end. The tooth is slightly curved upward towards the tip. Measured on the lower side, the tooth is 11.76 mm long, but breakage means the true length is probably larger. The depth of the tooth is about 3.39 mm. Wilson and colleagues identified this incisor as Dakshina on the basis of its size; the upper and lower incisor that they assigned to an indeterminate gondwanathere are smaller.

=== Enamel microstructure ===
The microstructure of the enamel of VPL/JU/NKIM/25 has been studied. Unlike other gondwanatheres, it has enamel consisting of three layers—radial enamel, tangential enamel, and PLEX. The rows of small, round enamel prisms are separated by interprismatic matrix that forms crystals oriented at right angles relative to the prisms. Prisms arise at the enamel-dentine junction, run through the enamel, and meet the outer enamel at a high angle. These features of the enamel are apparently adaptations that protect the tooth from cracks.

== Relationships ==
- - Ferugliotheriidae
  - Sudamericidae
    - Gondwanatherium
    - - Sudamerica
      - - Lavanify
        - Bharattherium

Relationships among gondwanatheres

Bharattherium is identifiable as a sudamericid because it has hypsodont molariforms with cementum-filled furrows. Among the four known sudamericid genera—Gondwanatherium and Sudamerica from Argentina; Lavanify from Madagascar; and Bharattherium—it shares with Sudamerica and Lavanify the presence of furrows that extend down to the base of the tooth. In addition, it shares several features with Lavanify, suggesting the two are closely related. Wilson and colleagues list three features shared by the two: the presence of an infundibulum (seen in only one of two specimens of Lavanify), interprismatic matrix, and perikymata. Prasad and colleagues also interpreted the interprismatic matrix as a shared character, but added the absence of enamel on one side of the tooth crown. Wilson and colleagues identified the presence of a V-shaped enamel lake on mf4 and of three layers in the enamel as autapomorphies (uniquely derived characters) of the Indian sudamericid.

== Range and ecology ==
Remains of Bharattherium have been found at three widely separated Late Cretaceous sites in peninsular India—Naskal, Andhra Pradesh; Gokak, Karnataka; and Kisalpuri, Madhya Pradesh. All sites are in the Intertrappean Beds (part of the Deccan Traps) and are Maastrichtian (latest Cretaceous) in age. The Intertrappean Beds have yielded a variety of fossil animals, including eutherian mammals such as Deccanolestes, Sahnitherium, and Kharmerungulatum. In the perhaps slightly older Infratrappean Beds, a possible member of the ancient and enigmatic mammalian group Haramiyida has been found, Avashishta. Members of the family Sudamericidae, in which Bharattherium is classified, are also known from the Cretaceous of Argentina, Madagascar, and possibly Tanzania and from the Paleogene of Argentina and Antarctica, and the second gondwanathere family, Ferugliotheriidae, is known with certainty only from the Cretaceous of Argentina. Thus, Bharattherium is an example of a Gondwanan faunal element in India and indicates biogeographic affinities with other Gondwanan landmasses such as Madagascar and South America.

In modern mammals, hypsodont teeth are often associated with diets that include abrasive vegetation such as grasses. Hypsodonty in sudamericids has been interpreted as indicating semiaquatic, terrestrial habits and a diet with items like roots or bark, because it was thought that grasses had not yet appeared when sudamericids lived. However, grass remains have been found at Intertrappean sites contemporary with those where Bharattherium was found, suggesting that sudamericids like Bharattherium were indeed the first grazing mammals.

It is among the two Indian mammal taxa that are inferred to have survived the KT event in India, alongside Deccanolestes.

== Literature cited ==
- von Koenigswald, W.; Goin, F.; Pascual, R. (1999). "Hypsodonty and enamel microstructure in the Paleocene gondwanatherian mammal Sudamerica ameghinoi". Acta Palaeontologica Polonica. 44 (3): 263–300.
- Krause, D. W.; Prasad, G. V. R.; von Koenigswald, W.; Sahni, A.; Grine, F. E. (1997). "Cosmopolitanism among Gondwanan Late Cretaceous mammals" (PDF). Nature. 390 (6659): 504–507. Bibcode:1997Natur.390..504K. doi:10.1038/37343. S2CID 205025618. Archived from the original (PDF) on 2010-06-11.
- Prasad, G.V.R. (2008). "Sedimentary basins & fossil records". In Singhvi, A.K.; Bhattacharya, A (eds.). Glimpses of Geoscience Research in India: The Indian Report to IUGS 2004–2008. New Delhi: The Indian National Academy of Sciences. pp. 90–96.
- Prasad, G. V. R.; Sahni, A. (2009). "Late Cretaceous continental vertebrate fossil record from India: Palaeobiogeographical insights". Bulletin de la Société Géologique de France. 180 (4): 369–381. doi:10.2113/gssgfbull.180.4.369.
- Prasad, V.; Strömberg, C. A. E.; Alimohammadian, H.; Sahni, A. (2005). "Dinosaur coprolites and the early evolution of grasses and grazers". Science. 310 (5751): 1177–1180. Bibcode:2005Sci...310.1177P. doi:10.1126/science.1118806. PMID 16293759. S2CID 1816461.
- Prasad, G.V.R.; Verma, O.; Sahni, A.; Krause, D.W.; Khosla, A.; Parmar, V. (2007). "A new late Cretaceous gondwanatherian mammal from central India". Proceedings of the Indian National Science Academy. 73 (1): 17–24.
- Wilson, G. P.; Das Sarma, D. C.; Anantharaman, S. (2007). "Late Cretaceous sudamericid gondwanatherians from India with paleobiogeographic considerations of Gondwanan mammals". Journal of Vertebrate Paleontology. 27 (2): 521–531. doi:10.1671/0272-4634(2007)27[521:LCSGFI]2.0.CO;2. S2CID 130294882.
