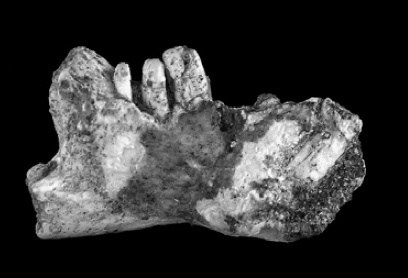
- TNM 02067, the holotype of Galulatherium, a partial lower jaw bone with teeth

Scientific classification
- Kingdom: Animalia
- Phylum: Chordata
- Class: Mammalia
- Clade: †Gondwanatheria (?)
- Genus: †Galulatherium; O' Connor et al., 2019
- Species: †G. jenkinsi

Binomial name
- †Galulatherium jenkinsi O' Connor et al., 2019

= Galulatherium =

Galulatherium Temporal range: Turonian-Campanian ~92–71 Ma

Fossil taxon

Galulatherium is an extinct genus of possibly gondwanathere mammal, from the Late Cretaceous (Turonian-Campanian)-aged Galula Formation of Tanzania. It is known solely from the type specimen TNM 02067 (Tanzanian National Museums specimen 02067) (Note: Krause et al. (2003, p. 323 and throughout) refer to the specimen as NMT 02067, standing for "National Museums of Tanzania", but O'Connor et al. (2006, p. 282) use "TNM 02067", an abbreviation for "Tanzanian National Museums" (p. 279).) a fragmentary fossil dentary (lower jaw). The short, deep bone is about 19.5 mm (0.77 in) long, but the back part is broken off. It contains a large, forward-inclined incisor with a root that extends deep into the jaw, separated by a diastema (gap) from four cheekteeth. Very little remains of the teeth, but enough to determine that they are hypsodont (high-crowned). The third cheektooth is the largest and the roots of the teeth are curved. First described in 2003, TNM 02067 has been tentatively identified as a sudamericid—an extinct family of high-crowned gondwanathere mammals otherwise known from South America, Madagascar, India, and Antarctica. If truly a gondwanathere, it would be the only African member of the group and may be the oldest. The describers could not exclude other possibilities, such as that the jaw represents some mammalian group known only from younger, Cenozoic times (less than 66 million years ago). In 2012 the fossil was CT scanned, which revealed additional details of the specimen, published in 2019.

== Discovery and context ==
Galulatherium was discovered in 2002 in the locality TZ-07 in the Mbeya Region of southwestern Tanzania, which has also yielded remains of various other vertebrates, including birds and other saurischian dinosaurs. The discovery was reported in a 2003 paper by David Krause and colleagues. TZ-07 lies in the "Red Sandstone Group" (RSG), an informal, poorly defined rock unit. Age estimates for the RSG have ranged from middle Jurassic to Miocene, but according to Krause and colleagues, part of this discrepancy is the result of confusion between two superficially similar rock units that outcrop nearby; the older one, where TZ-07 is located, is undoubtedly Mesozoic and the younger is Cenozoic. The former was later identified as the mid-late Cretaceous aged Galula Formation, and the latter as the Oligocene aged Nsungwe Formation. Based on the presence of non-avian dinosaurs and osteoglossomorph fishes, Krause and colleagues assigned TZ-07 to the Cretaceous (146–66 million years ago). In 2007, Nancy Stevens and colleagues identified the unit that produced TNM 02067 as likely belonging to the middle part of the Cretaceous (around Aptian to Cenomanian). TNM 02067 is significant as one of the very few mammals from the Cretaceous of the southern continents (Gondwana).

== Description ==
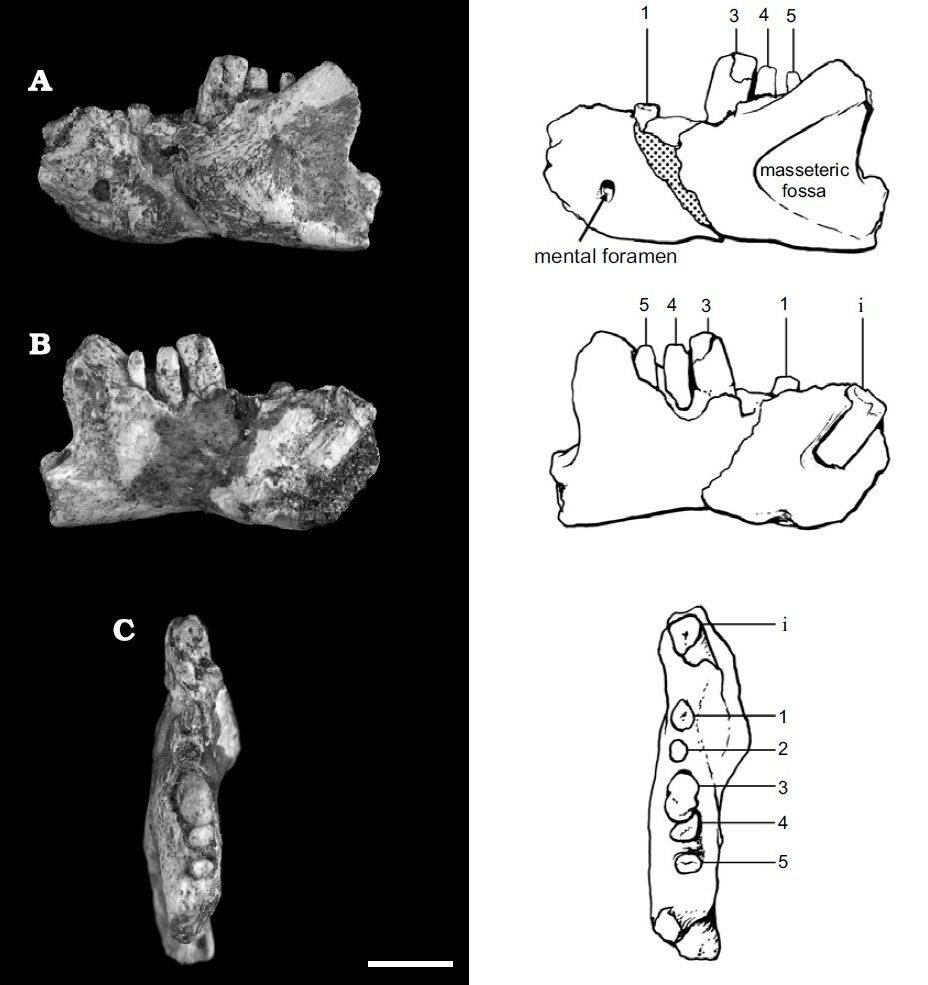
Photographs and illustrations of TNM 02067 in labial (A), lingual (B), and occlusal (C) views. Scale bar=5 mm

TNM 02067 is a damaged, partial left dentary (lower jaw bone). It preserves much of the body of the bone, which is short and deep, but is broken along a vertical fracture behind the toothrow. There is another fracture in the front part of the jaw. The bone is 19.5 mm (0.77 in) long and 11.4 mm (0.45 in) deep. All the teeth are incomplete or absent, and lack both enamel and cementum, but what remains indicates that there was a large incisor at the front and five cheekteeth further back, separated by a diastema (gap) of about 2.5 mm (0.098 in). On the labial (outer) surface of the dentary, there is one large mental foramen (opening). The mandibular symphysis, where the two halves of the lower jaw meet, is poorly preserved, but there is nothing to suggest that the left and right dentaries were fused. The lower margin of the bone is convex at the front, but concave further back, so that the depth of the dentary is 8.3 mm (0.33 in) below the diastema, but only 7.0 mm (0.28 in) below the third cheektooth. The origin of the coronoid process, a projection at the back of the dentary, lies far to the front.

The large incisor is inclined forward, and its root—the only part of the tooth that is preserved—forms an angle of about 55° with the horizontal. At the tip of the alveolus, where the tooth projects out of the bone, it is 3.0 mm (0.12 in) high and 2.1 mm broad. The root extends through the dentary to a position below the third cheektooth. Only the roots of the first and second cheekteeth are preserved. Both are about 1.5 mm in diameter, but the first tooth may have been slightly smaller than the second. The third tooth, the largest of the cheekteeth, has the root slightly curved backward. This root is deeply anchored in the dentary, extending down through about three-fourths of the bone. The crown is preserved in the form of a stump of dentine, 2.3 mm (0.091 in) long and 1.9 mm (0.075 in) broad, that extends high above the dentary, indicating that the tooth was hypsodont (high-crowned). High dentine stumps also remain of the fourth and fifth cheekteeth. The fourth is about as large as the first and second and the fifth is smaller, with a diameter of about 1.0 mm (0.039 in). The fourth cheektooth also has a long, curved root, which extends more than halfway through the dentary, and that of the fifth tooth is even smaller and shorter. The orientation of the roots and teeth indicates that all the teeth were single-rooted.

== Identity ==
The dentary superficially resembles that of various other mammalian groups with enlarged incisors, such as rodents, lagomorphs, hyraxes, wombats, the aye-aye, and the extinct apatemyids, tillodonts, and taeniodonts—all of which are known only from the Cenozoic, less than 66 million years ago. Krause and colleagues could not exclude the possibility that TNM 02067 represents an early member of such a group or an otherwise unknown major group of mammals. However, only two groups of Mesozoic mammals resemble TNM 02067: gondwanatheres; and multituberculates in the superfamilies Djadochtatherioidea and Taeniolabidoidea. Djadochtatherioids and taeniolabidoids occur in the late Cretaceous through Paleogene of the northern continents (Laurasia), and gondwanatheres, an enigmatic group of uncertain evolutionary affinities, are known from the late Cretaceous through Paleogene of Gondwana, with forms such as Gondwanatherium, Sudamerica (both from Argentina), Lavanify (Madagascar), and Bharattherium (India).

No multituberculates are known to have had hypsodont teeth, none has more than two molariform (molar-like) teeth in a single toothrow, and most have large, blade-like teeth. However, the form of the remains of TNM 02067's third cheektooth suggests it was not such a blade-like tooth and that at least the last three cheekteeth were likely molariform. In these respects, TNM 02067 does resemble gondwanatheres in the family Sudamericidae, and Krause and colleagues tentatively identified it as representing that family, primarily on the basis of its hypsodont teeth. Krause and colleagues compared the dentary in detail to that of Sudamerica, the only other gondwanathere for which a substantial fragment of the jaw was known. Sudamerica has only four, not five, cheekteeth (all of which are molariform), a higher, narrower incisor with a root that extends further through the dentary, and a longer diastema; in all these respects, TNM 02067 is more primitive. In addition, the mental foramen of the TNM 02067 is located lower and the cheekteeth vary more in size.

If truly a gondwanathere, Galulatherium extends the known geographic range of the group to another part of Gondwana, the African mainland. The uncertain age of locality TZ-07 renders a precise assessment of the significance of TNM 02067 difficult. It may well be older than the oldest previously known gondwanathere, the Campanian Gondwanatherium. It also has implications for the hypothesis that Africa was isolated from the rest of Gondwana from an early date—as early as the early Cretaceous—and consequently had a fauna distinct from the rest of Gondwana for much of the Cretaceous, as it may be closely related to the sudamericids of South America, India, Madagascar, and Antarctica, a highly derived group.
