= Intertrappean Beds =

Geologic formation in India

- Stratigraphic range: Maastrichtian-Ypresian, 67.7–56 Ma
- Type: Unit
- Unit of: Deccan Traps
- Overlies: Infratrappean Beds

Location
- Coordinates: 17.2°N 77.9°E
- Approximate paleocoordinates: 28.0°S 59.0°E
- Region: Madhya Pradesh, Maharashtra, Telangana, Gujarat, Uttar Pradesh, Andhra Pradesh, Karnataka
- Country: India
- Intertrappean Beds (India)

The Intertrappean Beds are a Late Cretaceous and early Paleogene geologic unit in India. These beds are found as interbeds between Deccan Traps layers, including the slightly older Lameta Formation. They consist a number of different subgroups and formations, and span the Cretaceous–Paleogene boundary.

Many mostly fragmentary fossils, especially of small vertebrates, are known from the formation. Indeterminate theropod and pterosaur remains have been recovered from the formation, as well as dinosaur eggs. The mammal genera Deccanolestes, Sahnitherium, Bharattherium, Indoclemensia, Indotriconodon and Kharmerungulatum have been recovered from several localities. The Early Eocene-aged Bamanbor locality in Gujarat preserves articulated freshwater fish specimens. A rich plant flora is known from the formation.

== Stratigraphy ==
Although often thought of as a contemporaneous unit that was formed in a single rapid eruption event, more studies that date the age of the volcanic beds indicate that the Deccan Traps did not erupt all at once. Instead, different portions appear to have erupted during different periods of time. This means that the Intertrappean Beds are best understood as a group of different volcanic-associate formations of varying ages.

=== Divisions ===
Kale et al (2020) divided the group into the following provinces:

- Sahyadri Group or Western Province (age: Late Maastrichtian to Danian, ~67.5 to 62.5 mya)
- Satpura Group or Central Province
- Malwa Group (age: Late Maastrichtian, ~67.7 mya; likely the oldest group)
- Amarkantak Group or Mandla Province (age: early Paleogene, ~64.5 mya - unknown)

Mittal et al (2021) divided the group into the following provinces:

- Western Ghats-Central Indian Volcanic Province (WVP) (age: Late Maastrichtian to Danian)
- Saurhastra-Kutchh Province (age: ?Maastrichtian to early Eocene)
- Malwa Plateau Province (age: Late Maastrichtian)
- Mandla Lobe Province (age: early Paleogene)

=== Formations ===
==== Chemostratigraphic definition ====
Kale et al (2020) divided the group as follows. Subgroups/formations are classified based on oldest to youngest.

- Wai Subgroup (youngest)
  - Desur Formation
  - Panhala Formation
  - Mahabaleshwar Formation (~63.2 mya)
  - Ambenali Formation
  - Poladpur Formation
- Lonavala Subgroup
  - Bushe Formation
  - Khandala Formation
- Kalsubai Subgroup (oldest, ~67.5 mya)
  - Bhimashankar Formation
  - Thakurwadi Formation
  - Neral Formation
  - Igatpuri Formation
  - Jawhar Formation

==== Lithostratigraphic definition ====
Kale et al (2020) divided the group as follows. Subgroups/formations are classified based on oldest to youngest.

- Sahyadri Group:
  - Bombay Subgroup (~62.5 mya)
    - Borivali Formation
    - Elephanta Formation
  - Khandala Subgroup (~67.5 to 63.2 mya)
    - Mahabaleshwar Formation (~63.2 mya)
    - Purandargarh Formation
    - Diveghat Formation
    - Karla Formation
    - Indrayani Formation
  - Kalsubai Subgroup (oldest: ~67.5 mya)
    - Upper Ratangarh Formation
    - Lower Ratangarh Formation
    - Salher Formation
- Satpura Group:
  - Karanja Formation (youngest)
  - Buldhana Formation
  - Chikli Formation
  - Ajanta Formation
  - Upper Ratangarh Formation
  - Karanja Formation
  - Buldana Formation
  - Chikli Formation (oldest)
- Malwa Group:
  - Singarchori Formation (youngest)
  - Bargonda Formation
  - Indore Formation
  - Kankaria-Pirukheri Formation
  - Kalisindh Formation
  - Mandleshwar Formation
  - Gaganwara Formation (oldest)
- Amarkantak Group:
  - Kuleru Formation (youngest)
  - Khamla/Kampla Formation
  - Amarwara Formation
  - Multai Formation
  - Linga Formation
  - Pipardehi Formation
  - Dhuma Formation
  - Mandla Formation (oldest, ~64.4 mya)

Within the newly defined Saurhastra Group (age: Paleocene to early Eocene), the following divisions were found by Patel & Shah (2023):

- Ninama Basin:
  - Ninama Limestone (youngest)
  - Sukhbhadar Formation (oldest)
- Chotila Basin:
  - Bamanbor Formation (youngest)
  - Chotila Chert
  - Rangpar Formation (oldest)

== Paleobiota ==
Color key: Taxon / Reclassified taxon / Taxon falsely reported as present / Dubious taxon or junior synonym / Ichnotaxon / Ootaxon / Morphotaxon	Notes; Uncertain or tentative taxa are in small text; ~~crossed out~~ taxa are discredited.

=== Fish ===
Genus	Species	Location	Stratigraphic position	Material	Notes	Images
Anthracoperca	A. bhatiai	Naskal, Rangapur		Otolith.	A percoid otolith.	
Apateodus	A. striatus	Asifabad			An enchodontoid aulopiform.	
Ariidae	incertae sedis	Naskal, Rangapur, Anjar		Otolith.	An ariid catfish otolith.	
?Belonostomus	B. indicus	Nagpur			An aspidorhynchid.	
Coupatezia	C. sp	Asifabad			An eagle ray.	
Cyprinidae	incertae sedis	Deothan-Kheri			A cyprinid.	
Dapalis	D. erici	Rangapur		Otolith.	A serranid otolith.	
"Eotrigonodon"	"E." wardhaensis	Asifabad			Initially described as tetraodontiform, but likely represent grasping teeth of pycnodonts.	
Enchodus	E. sp	Asifabad			An enchodontoid aulopiform.	
Horaclupea	H. intertrappea	Bamanbor	Early Eocene	Complete skeleton.	A clupeid.	
Igdabatis	I. indicus	Kisalpuri & Piplanarayanwar			An eagle ray.	
Indiaichthys	I. bamanborensis	Bamanbor	Early Eocene	Multiple complete skeletons.	A possible percoid.	
"Indotrigonodon"	"I." ovatus	Asifabad			Initially described as tetraodontiform, but likely represent grasping teeth of pycnodonts.	
"Lepidotes"	"L." sp	Asifabad			A lepisosteiform.	
Lepisosteus	L. indicus	Kisalpuri & Piplanarayanwar			A gar.	
Nandidae	incertae sedis	Deothan-Kheri			A nandid.	
Osteoglossidae	incertae sedis	Kisalpuri & Piplanarayanwar			An osteoglossid of uncertain affinities.	
Palaeolabrus	P. dormaalensis	Asifabad			A palaeolabrid.	
Palaeopristolepis	P. chiplonkari	Bamanbor	Early Eocene	Multiple partial skeletons.	A questionable leaffish.	
Palaeopristolepis	P. feddeni	Bamanbor	Early Eocene	Multiple partial skeletons.	A questionable leaffish.	
"Perca"	"P." angusta	Bamanbor	Early Eocene	Skull.	A possible percoid, classification very doubtful.	
Percomorpha	incertae sedis	Bamanbor	Early Eocene	Partial skeleton.	A percomorph of uncertain affinities.	
Phareodus	P. sp.	Asifabad, Naskal & Marepalli			A bonytongue.	
Polycanthidae	incertae sedis	Deothan-Kheri			A polycanthid.	
"Pisdurodon"	"P." spatulatus	Asifabad			Initially described as tetraodontiform, but likely represent grasping teeth of pycnodonts.	
Pycnodontidae	incertae sedis	Kisalpuri & Piplanarayanwar			A pycnodontid of uncertain affinities.	
"Pycnodus"	"P." lametae	Asifabad			A pycnodontid.	
Raja	R. sudhakari	Asifabad			A skate.	
Rhombodus	R. sp.	Asifabad			A stingray.	
Serranidae	incertae sedis	Deothan-Kheri			A serranid.	
Siluriformes	incertae sedis	Kisalpuri & Piplanarayanwar			A catfish of uncertain affinities.	
Sphenodus	S. sp.	Asifabad			A shark.	
Stephanodus	S. lybicus	Asifabad & Marepalli			A pycnodontid.	

==== Otolith-based taxa ====
Genus	Species	Location	Stratigraphic position	Material	Notes	Images
Ambassidarum	A. cappettai	Nagpur		Otolith	An ambassid otolith.	
Apogonidarum	A. curvatus	Naskal, Rangapur		Otolith	A cardinalfish otolith.	
Blenniidarum	B. sp	Rangapur		Otolith	A blenny otolith.	
?Centropomidarum	C. takliensis	Nagpur		Otolith	A possible snook otolith.	
Clupeidarum	C. valdiyai	Nagpur, Rangapur		Otolith	A clupeid otolith.	
Clupeidarum	C. sahnii	Nagpur, Rangapur		Otolith	A clupeid otolith.	
Gonorhynchidarum	G. rectangulus	Nagpur, Rangapur		Otolith	A gonorynchid otolith.	
Heterotidinarum	H. heterotoides	Naskal		Otolith	An arapaimine otolith.	
Notopteridarum	N. nolfi	Naskal, Rangapur, Cheemalagutta		Otolith	A notopterid otolith.	
Osteoglossidarum	O. deccanensis	Naskal,		Otolith	An osteoglossid otolith.	
Osteoglossidarum	O. intertrappus	Naskal,		Otolith	An osteoglossid otolith.	
Percoideorum	P. citreum	Naskal, Nagpur, Rangapur		Otolith	Percoid otoliths.	
Percoideorum	P. nagpurensis	Naskal, Nagpur, Rangapur		Otolith	Percoid otoliths.	
Percoideorum	P. rangapurensis	Naskal, Nagpur, Rangapur		Otolith	Percoid otoliths.	
?Pristolepidinarum	P. jaegeri	Nag		Otolith	A possible pristolepid otolith.	
Serranidarum	S. sp.	Anjar		Otolith	A serranid otolith.	

=== Amphibians ===
Genus	Species	Location	Stratigraphic position	Material	Notes	Images
Gobiatidae	incertae sedis	Naskal			A gobiatid frog.	
"Hemisotidae"/"Leptodactylidae"	incertae sedis	Naskal			A frog of uncertain affinities.	
Indobatrachus	I. pusillus	Worli Hill	Early Paleocene	Multiple complete skeletons	A frog of uncertain affinities.	
Pelobatidae	incertae sedis	Nagpur			A pelobatid frog.	
Ranoidea	incertae sedis	Naskal			A ranoid frog.	
Costata	incertae sedis				A costatan frog	
?Caudata	incertae sedis				A possible salamander.	

=== Reptiles ===
==== Turtles ====
Genus	Species	Location	Stratigraphic position	Material	Notes	Images
Carteremys	C. leithii	Worli Hill	Early Paleocene	Carapace, plastron, skull and partial mandible	A turtle of uncertain affinities.	
Sankuchemys	S. sethnai	Amboli Quarry		Skull	A bothremydid turtle.	

==== Lepidosaurs ====
Genus	Species	Location	Stratigraphic position	Material	Notes	Images
Acrosphenodontia	Incertae sedis	Naskal		Dentary with teeth.	An indeterminate rhynchocephalian.	
"Agama"	A. sp.	Rangapur			An indeterminate agamid lizard.	
Anguidae	Incertae sedis	Naskal			An indeterminate anguid lizard.	
?"Contogenys"	?"C." sp.	Nagpur			An indeterminate scincomorph lizard.	
Deccansaurus	D. palaeoindicus	Kesavi	Maastrichtian/Early Paleocene	Jaws & several osteoderms.	A scincoid lizard.	
?"Exostinus"	"E." estestai	Nagpur			An indeterminate xenosaurid lizard.	
"Eumeces"	"E." sp.	Rangapur			An indeterminate scincid lizard.	
Indophis	I. sahnii	Naskal		Over 160 vertebrae.	A nigerophiid snake.	
"Litakis"	"L." sp.	Nagpur			An indeterminate lizard.	
"Pristiguana"	"P." sp.	Nagpur			An indeterminate iguanid lizard.	
Serpentes	Incertae sedis	Naskal		A trunk vertebra & left dentary.	A snake.	
Serpentes	Incertae sedis				Possibly a primitive form,	
Madtsoiidae	Incertae sedis			Three individuals.	Madsoid snakes.	
cf. Indophis	cf. I. sahnii				Nigerophiidae snake.	
Booidea	Incertae sedis				Possibly a Booid snake.	

==== Crocodyliforms ====
Genus	Species	Location	Stratigraphic position	Material	Notes	Images
Crocodylidae	incertae sedis	Worli Hill		Teeth and dentary.	A crocodylid crocodyliform.	
Dyrosauridae	incertae sedis	Kisalpuri		Partial mandible, frontal, and vertebrae	A dyrosaurid crocodyliform.	
Crocodyliformes	incertae sedis	Naskal		Teeth.	Shows similarities to Hamadasuchus and perhaps Mahajangasuchus.	

==== Dinosaurs ====
Genus	Species	Location	Stratigraphic position	Material	Notes	Images
?"Hypselosaurus"	"H." sp	Mohgaon Kalan			A titanosaurian sauropod.	
Massospondylus	M. rawesi			Tooth	Previously thought to be Massospondylus now thought to have been an indeterminate Theropod.	
Sauropoda	Incertae sedis	Asifabad, Ranipur, Anjar		Bones.; Anjar specimen consists of tibia, fibula, radius, ulna, femur, scapula, claws, ribs and vertebrae, remains are fragile but well-preserved.	Indeterminate sauropods.	

===== Oogenera =====
Genus	Species	Location	Stratigraphic position	Material	Notes	Images
Megaloolithus	baghensis	Kisalpuri		Eggshell fragments	A Titanosaur egg.	
Subtiliolithus	kachhensis	Kisalpuri		Eggshell fragments	A Enantiornithine bird egg.	

==== Pterosaurs ====
Genus	Species	Location	Stratigraphic position	Material	Notes	Images
Pterosauria	incertae sedis	Sirol-khal locality			An indeterminate dentulous pterosaur. May not be from the Maastrichtian.	

=== Mammals ===
Genus	Species	Location	Stratigraphic position	Material	Notes	Images
Bharattherium	B. bonapartei	Kisalpuri		A fragmentary cheek-tooth.	A sudamericid mammal.	
Deccanolestes	D. hislopi	Naskal microvertebrate site		Molars, calcanea, astralgi, humerus, ulna.	A eutherian mammal.	
Deccanolestes	D. robustus	Naskal microvertebrate site		"Dental material and an astragalus".	A eutherian mammal.	
Deccanolestes	D. narmadensis	Kisalpuri		"Isolated rear molar."	A eutherian mammal.	
Indoclemensia	I. naskalensis	Naskal microvertebrate site		Right second Molar.	A eutherian mammal.	
Indoclemensia	I. magnus	Naskal microvertebrate site		Left second Molar.	A eutherian mammal.	
Indotriconodon	I. magnus	Kutch		Single lower Molar.	A eutriconodont mammal.	
Kharmerungulatum	K. vanvaleni	Kisalpuri		Isolated right lower molar.	A eutherian mammal.	
Sahnitherium	S. rangapurensis	Rangapur microvertebrate site		Upper Molar.	A eutherian mammal.	

=== Arthropods ===
Genus	Species	Material	Location	Time Period	Notes	Images
?Buprestidae	Indeterminate		Maharashtra	Maastrichtian	A Jewel beetle.	
Lomatus	L. hislopi		Maharashtra	Maastrichtian	A Jewel beetle.	
?Curculionidae	Indeterminate		Maharashtra	Maastrichtian	A Snout beetle.	
Meristos	M. hunteri		Maharashtra	Maastrichtian	A Snout beetle.	
Ostracoda	Indeterminate		Maharashtra	Maastrichtian	An Ostracod.	
Palaeotanymecides	P. hislopi		Maharashtra	Maastrichtian	A Snout beetle.	

=== Mollusca ===
Genus	Species	Location	Stratigraphic position	Material	Notes	Images
Bamanboria	B. oblongis	Bamanbor	Early Eocene	Shells	A deccanoid freshwater mussel.	
Chotilia	C. deccanensis	Bamanbor	Early Eocene	Shells	A deccanoid freshwater mussel.	
Chotilia	C. trappeansis	Bamanbor	Early Eocene	Shells	A deccanoid freshwater mussel.	
Chotilia	C. tuberculata	Bamanbor	Early Eocene	Shells	A deccanoid freshwater mussel.	
Deccanoida	D. aleta	Bamanbor	Early Eocene	Shells	A deccanoid freshwater mussel.	
Deccanoida	D. congruis	Bamanbor	Early Eocene	Shells	A deccanoid freshwater mussel.	
Deccanoida	D. costaria	Bamanbor	Early Eocene	Shells	A deccanoid freshwater mussel.	
Limnaea	sp.	Maharashtra	Maastrichtian		A snail.	
Valvata	sp.	Maharashtra	Maastrichtian		A snail.	
Paludina	sp.	Maharashtra	Maastrichtian		A snail.	
Physa	P. prinsepii	Maharashtra	Maastrichtian		A snail.	

=== Flora ===
Genus	Species	Location	Stratigraphic position	Material	Notes	Images
Cocos	C. binoriensis				A coconut palm tree	
Connaroxylon	C. dimorphum	Dhagaon, Mandla district		Wood	Affinities with Connaraceae.	
Euphorbiotheca	E. deccanensis				Fruit, member of Euphorbiaceae.	
Chara	C. chhindwaraensis				Algae, Member of Characeae.	
Microchara	M. shivarudrappai				Algae, Member of Characeae.	
Platychara	P. closasi				Algae, Member of Characeae.	
Hyphaeneocarpon					Fruit, member of palm tribe Borasseae.	
Indovitis	I. chitaleyae				Member of Vitaceae.	
Elodeophyllum	E. deccanii				Member of Hydrocharitaceae.	
Sabalites	S. dindoriensis				Member of Coryphoideae.	
Sabalites	S. karondiensis				Member of Coryphoideae.	
Sabalites	S. ghughuaensis				Member of Coryphoideae.	
Sabalites	S. umariaensis				Member of Coryphoideae.	
Malvacipolloides	M. deccanensis				Member of Malvaceae.	
Malvacipolloides	M. intertrappea				Member of Malvaceae.	
Palmocarpon					Fruit, member of palm tribe Cocoseae.	
Palmoxylon	P. calamoides				Wood, member of palm tribe Trachycarpeae.	
Palmoxylon	P. caryoteaeoides				Wood, member of palm tribe Trachycarpeae.	
Palmoxylon	P. ceroxyloides				Wood, member of palm tribe Trachycarpeae.	
Palmoxylon	P. coryphaoides				Wood, member of palm tribe Trachycarpeae.	
Palmoxylon	P. dindoriensis				Wood, member of palm tribe Trachycarpeae.	
Palmoxylon	P. nannorrhopsoides				Wood, member of palm tribe Trachycarpeae.	
Palmoxylon	P. sabaleaeoides				Wood, member of palm tribe Trachycarpeae.	
Palmoxylon	P. trachycarpeaeense				Wood, member of palm tribe Trachycarpeae.	
Cryosophiloxylon	C. indicum				Member of Cryosophileae.	
Elioxylon	E. seoniensis				Member of Achariaceae and Salicaceae.	
Baccatocarpon	B. mohgaoensis				Fruit	
Phoenicites	P. deccansis				Member of Arecaceae.	
Pantocarpon					Fruit, member of Torricelliaceae.	
Dipterocarpus	D. dindoriensis				Member of Dipterocarpaceae.	
Phyllanthocarpon	P. singpurensis				Fruit, member of Phyllanthaceae.	
Ochnaceoxylon	O. tertiera				Member of Ochnaceae.	
Spinopinnophyllum	S. acanthorachis				Member of Arecaceae.	
Portulacaceocarpon	P. bhuterensis				Fruit, member of Portulacaceae.	
Rhizopalamoxylon	R. arecoides				Palm rhizome, close affinities to Nypa.	
Rhizopalamoxylon	R. nypoides				Palm rhizome, close affinities to Nypa.	
Pediastrum					Algae.	
Lecaniella					Algae.	
Pierceites	P. deccanensis				A Dinocyst.	
Aulacoseira					A Diatom.	
Azolla					Member of Salviniaceae.	
Palaeosinomenium	P. indicum				Member of Menispermaceae.	
Crybelosporites					Member of Marsileaceae.	
Sparganiaceaepollenites					Pollen grains, Member of Sparganiaceae/Typhaceae.	
Marsilea	M. patnii				Member Marsileaceae.	
Orthogonospermum	O. patanense				Member of Zingiberaceae.	
Regnellidium					Member of Marsileaceae.	
Nymphaeaceae indet.						
Typhaceae indet.						
Liliaceae indet.						
Kapgateophyllum	K. sp.				Member of Acanthaceae.	
Farabeipollis	P. deccanensis				Pollen.	
Pontederiaceae indet.						
Ovoidites					Member of Zygnemataceae.	
Gabonisporis					Pollen grains, member of Marsileaceae.	

== See also ==
- Lameta Formation
- List of dinosaur-bearing rock formations
  - List of stratigraphic units with indeterminate dinosaur fossils
- List of pterosaur-bearing stratigraphic units
