= Groeberiidae =

Groeberiidae Temporal range: Eocene - Oligocene 45–28 Ma

Scientific classification
- Kingdom: Animalia
- Phylum: Chordata
- Class: Mammalia
- Clade: Theriiformes
- Family: †Groeberiidae; Patterson, 1952

Genera
- †Epiklohnia?; †Groeberia; †Klohnia?; †Praedens?

Synonyms
- Groeberidae

Extinct family of mammals

Groeberiidae is a family of strange non-placental mammals from the Eocene and Oligocene epochs of Patagonia, Argentina and Chile, South America. Originally classified as paucituberculate marsupials, they were suggested to be late representatives of the allothere clade Gondwanatheria. However, the relationship of the type genus, Groeberia, to Gondwanatheria has been firmly rejected by other scholars.

== History ==
The type species, Groeberia minoprioi, was first described by Bryan Patterson in 1952. This type specimen, MMP 738, is composed of a mandibular symphisis, incisors and four broken molars. A second species within the genus, Groeberia pattersoni, was described by G. G. Simpson in 1970, and is known from at least two specimens. Both occur in the Divisadero Largo Formation deposits dating to the Eocene.

Flynn & Wyss, 1999 would go on to describe the Oligocene species Klohnia charrieri, and Goin et al., 2010 the taxa Klohnia major, Epiklohnia verticalis and Praedens aberrans, all also dating to this epoch.

Recently, Chimento et al. 2013 re-examined Groeberia and understood its allothere affinities. Other taxa were not included in this examination for so far unspecified reasons, rendering their status as part of the clade unknown.

== Classification ==
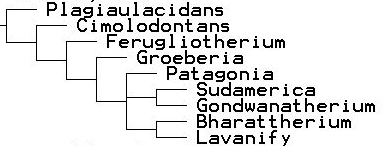
Gondwanatheria cladogram per Chimento et al., 2015.

For most of their history, groeberiids were thought to be paucituberculate marsupials. Though currently represented only by shrew opossums, through most of the Cenozoic Paucituberculata also included a variety of rodent-like species, making this assessment somewhat sound. However, this classification was provisory at best, since compared to other paucituberculates groeberiids were highly aberrant. A few differing opinions included Simpson & Wyss 1999, who considered these animals to be diprotodontians, and Pascual 1994 and Simpson 1970, who saw them as Metatheria incertae sedis, both of which contested.

More recently, Groeberia has been proposed to be a gondwanathere multituberculate, a group in which its "aberrant" attributes turned out to be fairly typical. Within Gondwanatheria, it was classified in a fairly basal position, having diverged before the diverse sudamericids but after Ferugliotherium.

Other groeberiids have not been included in this analysis; whether they're gondwanatheres or paucituberculates is yet to be determined.

Well before this reassignment, Malcolm McKenna expressed doubts on a marsupial identity for groeberiids, claiming that considering them metatherians was "an act of faith".

However, Zimicz & Goin (2020) claimed that the anatomy of the teeth of Groeberia supports the metatherian affinities of this taxon. The phylogenetic analysis conducted by these authors recovered Groeberia as the sister taxon of Vombatiformes within Diprotodontia, though the authors cautioned that these results are preliminary.

== Characteristics ==
Groeberiids possess robust, deep snouts bearing elongated incisors and molariforme teeth adapted for a palinal (front-to-back) jaw stroke; once considered aberrant by marsupial standards, they are now fairly typical among multituberculate standards, even being closely compared to Vintana. (Note: When Chimento et al. 2013 was written, Vintana still lacked a binomial name, so it is referred to as "the Malagasy skull" in the paper.) They were almost certainly herbivores; Groeberia itself, unlike more derived gondwanatheres like sudamericids, lacked the specializations to cope with grass, and was probably a generalist herbivore, but other possible taxa like Epiklohnia do possess hypsodonty and are thought to be grazers.

== Ecology ==
Groeberiids co-existed with a variety of other mammal groups, such as marsupials and other metatherians such as sparassodonts, as well as odd placental groups such as meridiungulates and xenarthrans. The first South American caviomorph rodents are thought to have arrived to the continent roughly at the time these gondwanatheres were alive; competition, if any, between both groups is so far unresolved, though groeberiids are speculated to have been fairly specialised. Assuming the genera besides Groeberia are in fact groeberiids, the group achieved its highest diversity in the mid-Oligocene, well after rodents arrived.
