= Takli Formation =

Geologic formation in India

- Stratigraphic range: Maastrichtian
- Type: Geological formation

Lithology
- Primary: Claystone, siltstone, marl

Location
- Coordinates: 21.2°N 79.1°E
- Approximate paleocoordinates: 26.2°S 61.5°E
- Region: Maharashtra, Gujarat
- Country: India

Type section
- Named for: Tákli Plain
- Takli Formation (India)

The Takli Formation is a Maastrichtian geologic formation in India. Dinosaur remains diagnostic to the genus level are among the fossils that have been recovered from the formation.

== Paleobiota ==
Color key: Taxon / Reclassified taxon / Taxon falsely reported as present / Dubious taxon or junior synonym / Ichnotaxon / Ootaxon / Morphotaxon	Notes; Uncertain or tentative taxa are in small text; ~~crossed out~~ taxa are discredited.

=== Dinosaurs ===
Sauropods

Sauropods from the Takli Formation
Genus	Species	Material	Location	Time Period	Notes	Images
Fusioolithus	F. baghensis	eggshell fragments	Maharashtra	Maastrichtian	Sauropod Eggs.	
Sauropoda	Indeterminate	tooth	Gujarat	Maastrichtian	A Sauropod.	
Titanosauridae	Indeterminate	teeth	Maharashtra	Maastrichtian	A Titanosaur.	

Theropods

Theropods from the Takli Formation
Genus	Species	Material	Location	Time Period	Notes	Images
?Coelurosauria	Indeterminate	teeth	Maharashtra	Maastrichtian	Coelurosauria was a common wastebasket taxon.	
?Megalosauridae	Indeterminate	teeth	Maharashtra	Maastrichtian	Megalosauridae was a common wastebasket taxon.	
Massospondylus	M. rawesi	Tooth	Maharashtra	Maastrichtian	Previously thought to be a Massospondylus now known to be an indeterminate abelisaurid.	
Theropoda	Indeterminate	Teeth.	Gujarat	Maastrichtian	An indeterminate theropod.	

=== Other Archosaurs ===
Other Archosaurs from the Takli Formation
Genus	Species	Material	Location	Time Period	Notes	Images
Archosauria	Indeterminate	teeth	Maharashtra	Maastrichtian	Either a saurischian or a crocodillan.	
Crocodyliformes	Indeterminate		Maharashtra	Maastrichtian	A Crocodyliform.	

=== Lepidosaurs ===
Lepidosaurs from the Takli Formation
Genus	Species	Material	Location	Time Period	Notes	Images
Gekkonidae	Indeterminate		Maharashtra	Maastrichtian	A Gecko.	
Boidae	Indeterminate		Maharashtra	Maastrichtian	A Snake.	
Scincomorpha	Indeterminate		Maharashtra	Maastrichtian	A Scincomorph.	
?Contogenys	sp.		Maharashtra	Maastrichtian	A Globaurid.	
Anguidae	Indeterminate		Maharashtra	Maastrichtian	A Anguid.	
Litakis	sp.		Maharashtra	Maastrichtian	A Platynota.	
Exostinus	E. estesi E. estesai		Maharashtra	Maastrichtian	A Xenosaurid.	
Pristiguana	P. sp.		Maharashtra	Maastrichtian	An Iguanid.	
Iguanidae	Indeterminate		Maharashtra	Maastrichtian	An iguanid.	

=== Amphibians ===
Amphibians from the Takli Formation
Genus	Species	Material	Location	Time Period	Notes	Images
Anura	Indeterminate		Maharashtra	Maastrichtian	A Frog.	
Pelobatidae	Indeterminate		Maharashtra	Maastrichtian	A Spadefoot Toad.	

=== Fish ===
Fishes from the Takli Formation
Genus	Species	Material	Location	Time Period	Notes	Images
Pycnodus	P. lametae P. bicresta		Maharashtra	Maastrichtian	A Pycnodontid Fish.	
Belonostomus	sp.		Maharashtra	Maastrichtian	An Aspidorhynchid Fish.	
Sphyraena	sp.		Maharashtra	Maastrichtian	A Barracuda.	
Enchodus	E. ferox sp.		Maharashtra	Maastrichtian	An Enchodontid Fish.	
Clupeidae	Indeterminate		Maharashtra	Maastrichtian	A Clupeid Fish.	
Apateodus	A. striatus		Maharashtra	Maastrichtian	An Ichthyotringid Fish.	
Stephanodus	S. lybicus		Maharashtra	Maastrichtian	An Eotrigonodontid Fish.	
Ostracion	sp.		Maharashtra	Maastrichtian	An Ostraciid Fish.	
Palaeolabrus	P. dormaalensis		Maharashtra	Maastrichtian	A Palaeolabrid Fish.	
Lepisosteus	L. indicus		Maharashtra	Maastrichtian	A Gar.	
Lepidotes	sp.		Maharashtra	Maastrichtian	A possible late surviving lepidotid.	
Dasyatis	sp.		Maharashtra	Maastrichtian	A Whiptail stingray.	
Igdabatis	I. sigmodon		Maharashtra	Maastrichtian	An Eagle ray.	
Osteoglossum	O. deccanensis		Maharashtra	Maastrichtian	A osteoglossid Fish.	
Osteichthyes	Indeterminate	Ganoid and Cycloid scales	Maharashtra	Maastrichtian	An Bony fish.	

=== Mammals ===
Mammals from the Takli Formation
Genus	Species	Material	Location	Time Period	Notes	Images
Symmetrodonta	Indeterminate		Maharashtra	Maastrichtian	An Allotherian Mammal.	

=== Molluscas ===
Molluscas from the Takli Formation
Genus	Species	Material	Location	Time Period	Notes	Images
Bivalvia	Indeterminate		Maharashtra	Maastrichtian	A Clam.	
Limnaea	sp.		Maharashtra	Maastrichtian	A Snail.	
Valvata	sp.		Maharashtra	Maastrichtian	A Snail.	
Paludina	sp.		Maharashtra	Maastrichtian	A Snail.	
Physa	P. prinsepii		Maharashtra	Maastrichtian	A Snail.	

=== Crustaceans ===
Crustaceans from the Takli Formation
Genus	Species	Material	Location	Time Period	Notes	Images
Ostracoda	Indeterminate		Maharashtra	Maastrichtian	An Ostracod.	

=== Turtles ===
Turtles from the Takli Formation
Genus	Species	Material	Location	Time Period	Notes	Images
Pelomedusidae	Indeterminate		Maharashtra	Maastrichtian	A Pelomedusid Turtle.	
Testudinata	Indeterminate		Maharashtra	Maastrichtian	A Turtle.	

=== Insects ===
Insects from the Takli Formation
Genus	Species	Material	Location	Time Period	Notes	Images
?Buprestidae	Indeterminate		Maharashtra	Maastrichtian	A Jewel beetle.	
Lomatus	L. hislopi		Maharashtra	Maastrichtian	A Jewel beetle.	
?Curculionidae	Indeterminate		Maharashtra	Maastrichtian	A Snout beetle.	
Meristos	M. hunteri		Maharashtra	Maastrichtian	A Snout beetle.	
Palaeotanymecides	P. hislopi		Maharashtra	Maastrichtian	A Snout beetle.	

== See also ==
- List of dinosaur-bearing rock formations
  - List of stratigraphic units with few dinosaur genera
