= Patagonia peregrina =

Patagonia peregrina Temporal range: Early Miocene (Colhuehuapian) ~21.0–17.5 Ma

Scientific classification
- Kingdom: Animalia
- Phylum: Chordata
- Class: Mammalia
- Infraclass: Marsupialia
- Order: Paucituberculata
- Family: †Patagoniidae; Pascual and Carlini, 1987
- Genus: †Patagonia; Pascual & Carlini, 1987
- Species: †P. peregrina

Binomial name
- †Patagonia peregrina Pascual & Carlini, 1987

Extinct species of mammal

Patagonia is an extinct genus of non-placental mammal from the Miocene of Argentina. Traditionally considered a metatherian incertae sedis, one analysis suggested it to be a gondwanathere. However, this has been rejected by other authors.

== Description ==
Currently, a single species is known, Patagonia peregrina, hailing from the Colhuehuapian-dating deposits of the Sarmiento Formation, Chubut Province. The holotype, MACN-CH-869, is composed of a semi-complete mandible; isolated upper and lower teeth are also known. The jaw is short and deep, bearing an unfused subvertical dentary symphysis and dorsally positioned masseteric fossa. The incisors are rootless and extend lingually along the ventral border of the dentary up to the level of molariform 3, and the molariforms are hypsodont. The dental formula is:

Dentition
?
2.3

and the molariform elements are identical, so distinction between molars and premolars is impossible. Previously, the animal was thought to have canines, but several studies have found them to be a second pair of incisors.

== Classification ==
Originally, Patagonia was identified as some sort of marsupial mammal. However, due to its highly aberrant attributes, it tended to be singled out in its own order and family, Patagonioidea and Patagoniidae. Some phylogenetic studies recovered it as part of Paucituberculata, often lined with the equally confounding groeberiids, albeit in a purely provisory manner with no listed synapomorphies, based only on its rodent-like aspects.

Recent studies have instead found it to not be a marsupial or other form of metatherian at all, but a gondwanathere allothere. The supposed "aberrant" traits were claimed to be normal in this clade, and it has been recovered as nesting within the sudamericid assemblage. However, this conclusion has been rejected by other scholars.

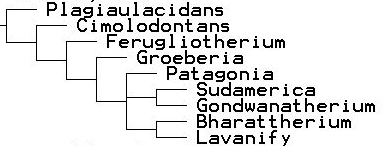
Gondwanatheria cladogram per Chimento et al. 2015

== Biology ==
Patagonia was a fossorial herbivore. Its jaw and dental anatomy is similar to that of burrowing rodents, to the point that the original description referred to it as a "marsupial tuco-tuco". Like several other multituberculates as well as modern Glires it had rootless incisors, meaning that they never stopped growing.

Like other sudamericids it had hypsodont molariforms. This means it was well adapted to chew grass, and was most likely a grazer, which coincides with the plains environment where it once lived.

Like other allotheres its masseteric anatomy and molariform orientation suggest that it had a palinal jaw stroke (front-to-back), a chewing style not seen in modern mammals and one of several traits previously considered "aberrant".

== Ecology ==
The Colhuehuapian deposits of the Sarmiento Formation show a general steppe or savanna-like environment, with a high degree of grass phytoliths, as opposed to earlier forest environments in the region. This coincides with Patagonia's burrowing, grazing habits.

A large variety of mammal species are known, including caviomorph rodents such as Dudumus, as well as the rodent-like argyrolagoidean paucituberculates. Patagonia likely avoided competition in its fairly specialised niche.
