= Kankatodus =

Kankatodus Temporal range: Early Eocene

Scientific classification
- Kingdom: Animalia
- Phylum: Chordata
- Class: Actinopterygii
- Order: †Pycnodontiformes
- Genus: †Kankatodus; Kumar & Loyal, 1987
- Species: †K. cappettai

Binomial name
- †Kankatodus cappettai Kumar & Loyal, 1987

Extinct genus of fishes

Kankatodus is a dubious extinct genus of marine pycnodont ray-finned fish from the Early Eocene-aged Subathu Formation of Himachal Pradesh, India. It contains a single species, K. cappettai, named for paleoichthyologist Henri Cappetta. It was initially described as an early tetraodontiform in the now-defunct family Eotrigonodontidae, alongside Stephanodus, Indotrigonodon, and Pisdurodon. However, later studies have found the Eotrigonodontidae to actually represent the grasping teeth of pycnodonts.

== See also ==
- Prehistoric fish
- List of prehistoric bony fish
