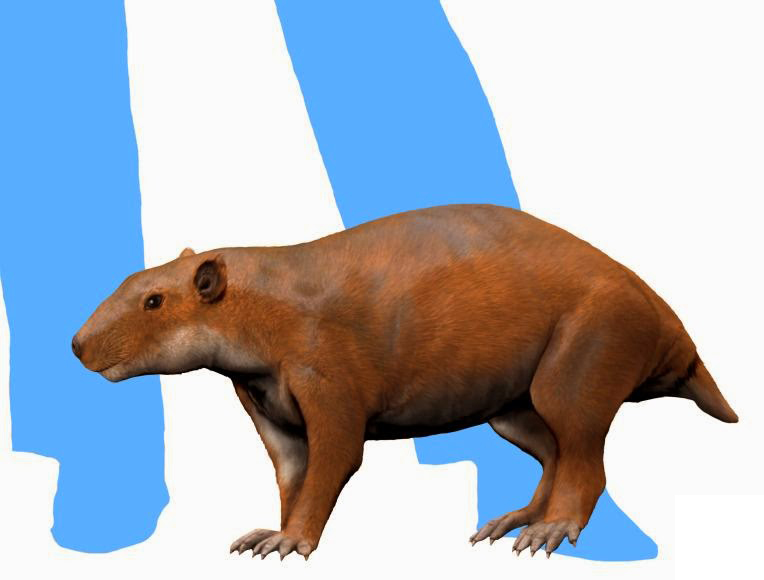
- Life reconstruction of Vintana sertichi. Postcranial reconstruction is hypothetical.

Scientific classification
- Kingdom: Animalia
- Phylum: Chordata
- Class: Mammalia
- Family: †Sudamericidae
- Genus: †Vintana; Krause et al., 2014
- Species: †V. sertichi

Binomial name
- †Vintana sertichi Krause et al., 2014

= Vintana =

Vintana Temporal range: Maastrichtian ~70.6–66 Ma

Extinct species of mammal

Vintana sertichi is an early gondwanatherian mammal dating from the Late Cretaceous, approximately 66 million years ago. Scientists found the lone fossil, a skull, on Madagascar's west coast in the Maastrichtian Maevarano Formation.

Vintana is extremely relevant to the understanding of gondwanatheres because it is the first well-preserved skull, as opposed to previous fragments and teeth. Establishing a connection with multituberculates and haramiyidans in the theriiform clade Allotheria, it is a rather unusual animal, possessing massive lateral flanges in its skull whose exact purpose is poorly understood, as well as massive olfactory bulbs. A rather large animal at a weight of 19 pounds (8.74 kg), Vintana also represents another example of a considerably large Mesozoic mammal alongside Adalatherium, another gondwanathere from same formation, this body mass is only exceeded by Repenomamus and Patagomaia.

== See also ==
- 2014 in mammal paleontology
