= UA 8699 =

Fossil mammalian tooth from Madagascar

UA 8699 (University of Antananarivo specimen 8699) is a fossil mammalian tooth from the Cretaceous of Madagascar. A broken lower molar about 3.5 mm (0.14 in) long, it is from the Maastrichtian of the Maevarano Formation in northwestern Madagascar. Details of its crown morphology indicate that it is a boreosphenidan, a member of the group that includes living marsupials and placental mammals. David W. Krause, who first described the tooth in 2001, interpreted it as a marsupial on the basis of five shared characters, but in 2003 Averianov and others noted that all those are shared by zhelestid placentals and favored a close relationship between UA 8699 and the Spanish zhelestid Lainodon. Krause used the tooth as evidence that marsupials were present on the southern continents (Gondwana) as early as the late Cretaceous and Averianov and colleagues proposed that the tooth represented another example of faunal exchange between Africa and Europe at the time.

== Discovery and context ==
UA 8699 was discovered in a joint study by Stony Brook University and the University of Antananarivo (UA) and placed in the collections of the latter as specimen 8699. It was found at a locality named MAD93-95 in the Anembalemba Member of the Maevarano Formation, which is Maastrichtian (latest Cretaceous) in age. The locality is in the Mahajanga Basin of northwestern Madagascar. Several other mammals have been recovered from similarly aged Madagascar deposits, but most are also known from very limited material. These include the gondwanathere Lavanify, an indeterminate multituberculate, and a few other indeterminate teeth, as well as a nearly complete skeleton representing an otherwise unknown mammalian lineage. In a 2001 Nature paper, David Krause announced the discovery of UA 8699 and argued for marsupial affinities of the specimen. Because the specimen is so fragmentary, he refrained from assigning a new scientific name to the tooth. Two years later, Alexander Averianov, David Archibald, and Thomas Martin favored a placental interpretation in a paper in Acta Palaeontologica Polonica, noting that the specimen was essentially similar to the zhelestid Lainodon. In a 2006 review of some of the Cretaceous vertebrates of Madagascar, Krause and colleagues continued to consider the specimen as a marsupial and announced that an upcoming paper by Case would make the case for marsupial affinities more fully.

== Description ==
UA 8699 is a worn and broken left lower molar. Part of the trigonid (the front group of cusps), at the mesiolingual (inner front) corner of the tooth is missing. Krause estimated that the complete tooth would have been 3.5 mm (0.14 in) long and 2.2 mm (0.09 in) wide. The tooth is tribosphenic, like that of modern mammals, as indicated by a number of features, including the broad basin of the talonid (the back group of cusps), and the acute angle (48°) between the cusps of the trigonid. UA 8699 lacks a cingulid (ridge) resembling a shelf on the lingual (inner) side, indicating that is not a member of Australosphenida (the proposed clade uniting monotremes and some ancient Gondwanan mammals, including the Jurassic Madagascan Ambondro); thus, it can be identified as representing Boreosphenida, which includes marsupials, placentals, and their extinct relatives.

Krause listed five features that indicate that UA 8699 is a marsupial, not a placental or primitive therian. There is a well-developed cingulid at the outer back margin (distobuccally), between the hypoconid (one of the main cusps) and the hypoconulid (a smaller cuspule). The hypoconulid itself is located far lingually, relatively far from the hypoconid. The trigonid and talonid are about as broad, the trigonid is low-crowned, and wear is mainly horizontal, resulting in broad, flat exposed wear facets. Averianov and colleagues noted that zhelestids, a placental group, share all those traits, though to varying degrees, and that the hypoconulid in similarly aged marsupials is even more lingually located, "twinned" to the entoconid (the cusp on the back lingual corner of the tooth). They wrote that the specimen is on the whole more similar to zhelestids than to marsupials.

== Interpretations ==
Krause wrote that UA 8699 was the first marsupial to be identified from Madagascar and the first from the Mesozoic of any part of Gondwana. Marsupials date back to the Eocene in Australia and Africa and to the Paleocene in South America; although Cretaceous marsupials have been recorded there, none of the records are unambiguous. Marsupials were certainly present in the Northern Hemisphere during the late Cretaceous. He interpreted UA 8699 as evidence that marsupials must already have colonized the southern continents by the late Cretaceous, presumably having reached Madagascar through South America and Antarctica. By the late Cretaceous, boreosphenidans must already have been in the process of replacing archaic mammals like gondwanatheres on the southern continents, as suggested by the presence of Deccanolestes, a placental, in the Cretaceous of India.

Averianov, Archibald, and Martin instead placed UA 8699 in the context of faunal similarity and exchange between the late Cretaceous faunas of Europe and Africa, noting the presence of similar animals, such as snakes (Madtsoia) and sauropods (Lirainosaurus and Rapetosaurus), in the Cretaceous faunas of Madagascar and the Spanish locality Laño. They proposed the relationship between Lainodon, which is from Laño, and UA 8699 as another example of this relationship and cited a previous prediction by Gheerbrant and Astibia that zhelestids similar to Lainodon would be found in Africa.

== Literature cited ==
- Averianov, A.O.; Archibald, J.D.; Martin, T. (2003). "Placental nature of the alleged marsupial from the Cretaceous of Madagascar". Acta Palaeontologica Polonica. 48 (1): 149–151.
- Krause, D.W. (2001). "Fossil molar from a Madagascan marsupial". Nature. 412 (6846): 497–498. Bibcode:2001Natur.412..497K. doi:10.1038/35087649. PMID 11484038. S2CID 22043174.
- Krause, D.W.; O'Connor, P.M.; Rogers, K.C.; Sampson, S.D.; Buckley, G.A.; Rogers, R.R. (2006). "Late Cretaceous Terrestrial Vertebrates from Madagascar: Implications for Latin American Biogeography" (PDF). Annals of the Missouri Botanical Garden. 93 (2): 178–208. doi:10.3417/0026-6493(2006)93[178:LCTVFM]2.0.CO;2. JSTOR 40035721. S2CID 9166607. Archived from the original (PDF) on 2019-02-15.
