= Greniodon =

Greniodon Temporal range: Mid Eocene (Mustersan-Divisaderan) ~48.6–40.4 Ma

Scientific classification
- Kingdom: Animalia
- Phylum: Chordata
- Class: Mammalia
- Clade: †Gondwanatheria
- Genus: †Greniodon; Goin et al., 2012

Type species
- †Greniodon sylvaticus Goin et al., 2012

Extinct genus of tetrapods

Greniodon is a genus of extinct gondwanatherian mammal known from the Early to Middle Eocene (Lutetian age, Mustersan to Divisaderan in the SALMA classification) of Argentina. A single species, Greniodon sylvaticus, is known, described in 2012 on the basis of two teeth found in the Andesitas Huancache Formation.
