= Grit, not grass hypothesis =

The grit, not grass hypothesis is an evolutionary hypothesis that explains the evolution of high-crowned teeth, particularly in New World mammals. The hypothesis is that the ingestion of gritty soil is the primary driver of hypsodont tooth development, not the silica-rich composition of grass, as was previously thought.

== Traditional co-evolution hypothesis ==
Since the morphology of the hypsodont tooth is suited to a more abrasive diet, hypsodonty was thought to have evolved concurrently with the spread of grasslands. During the Cretaceous Period (145-66 million years ago), the Great Plains were covered by a shallow inland sea called the Western Interior Seaway which began to recede during the Late Cretaceous to the Paleocene (65-55 million years ago), leaving behind thick marine deposits and relatively flat terrain. During the Miocene and Pliocene epochs (25 million years), the continental climate became favorable to the evolution of grasslands. Existing forest biomes declined and grasslands became much more widespread. The grasslands provided a new niche for mammals, including many ungulates that switched from browsing diets to grazing diets. Grass contains silica-rich phytoliths (abrasive granules), which wear away dental tissue more quickly. So the spread of grasslands was linked to the development of high-crowned (hypsodont) teeth in grazers.

== Modern evolutionary hypothesis ==
=== Early evidence ===
In 2006 Strömberg examined the independent acquisition of high-crowned cheek teeth (hypsodonty) in several ungulate lineages (e.g., camelids, equids, rhinoceroses) from the early to middle Miocene of North America, which had been classically linked to the spread of grasslands. She showed habitats dominated by C3 grasses (cool-season grasses) were established in the Central Great Plains by early late Arikareean (≥21.9 Million years ago), at least 4 million years prior to the emergence of hypsodonty in Equidae. In 2008 Mendoza and Palmqvist determined the relative importance of grass consumption and open habitat foraging in the development of hypsodont teeth using a dataset of 134 species of artiodactyls and perissodactyls. The results suggested that high-crowned teeth represent are adapted for a particular feeding environment, not diet preference.

=== Morphology ===
More recent examination of mammalian teeth suggests that it is the open, gritty habitat and not the grass itself which is linked to diet changes. Analysis of dental microwear patterns of hypsodont notoungulates from the Late Oligocene Salla Beds of Bolivia showed shearing movements are associated with a diet rich in tough plants, not necessarily grasses. Hence the relationship between high-crowned mammals and the source of tooth wear in the fossil record may not be straightforward and the spread of grasslands in South America, traditionally linked with the development of notoungulate hypsodonty, was called into question.

=== Temporal discontinuity ===
Most importantly, evidence has shown, that the development of hypsodonty in Cenozoic mammals is out of sync with the flourishing of grasslands both in North America and South America, where grasslands spread 10 million years earlier. Observations of this temporal discontinuity between the spread grasslands and the development of hypsodonty in mammals is also supported by earlier evidence of hypsodonty in dinosaurs. For example, hadrosaurs, a group of herbivorous dinosaurs, likely grazed on low-lying vegetation and microwear patterns show that their diet contained an abrasive material, such as grit or silica. Grasses had evolved by the Late Cretaceous, but were not particularly common, so this study concluded that grass probably did not play a major component in the hadrosaur's diet.

== Modern examples of hypsodonty ==
Hypsodonty is observed both in the fossil record and the modern world. It is a characteristic of large clades (equids) as well as subspecies level specialization. For example, the Sumatran rhinoceros and the Javan rhinoceros both have brachydont, lophodont cheek teeth whereas the Indian rhinoceros, has hypsodont dentition. A mammal may have exclusively hypsodont molars or have a mix of dentitions. Hypsodont dentition is characterized by:

- High-crowned teeth
- A rough, flattish occlusal surface adapted for crushing and grinding
- Cementum both above and below the gingival line
- Enamel which covers the entire length of the body and likewise extends past the gum line
- The cementum and the enamel invaginate into the thick layer of dentine
