= Indotrigonodon =

Indotrigonodon Temporal range: Maastrichtian

Scientific classification
- Kingdom: Animalia
- Phylum: Chordata
- Class: Actinopterygii
- Order: †Pycnodontiformes
- Family: †Pycnodontidae
- Genus: †Indotrigonodon
- Species: †I. ovatus

Binomial name
- †Indotrigonodon ovatus Jain & Sahni, 1983

Extinct genus of fishes

Indotrigonodon is a dubious form genus of prehistoric freshwater pycnodont fish that lived in India during the Late Cretaceous epoch. It contains a single species, I. ovatus known from the Maastrichtian-aged Lameta Formation & Intertrappean Beds in Maharashtra & Andhra Pradesh.

Alongside Stephanodus, Pisdurodon and Eotrigonodon, fossils of Indotrigonodon were initially identified as tooth plates from an early tetraodontiform fish. However, later studies found all these "genera" to represent different remains of indeterminate pycnodont fish, with Indotrigonodon representing oral teeth.

== See also ==
- Prehistoric fish
- List of prehistoric bony fish
