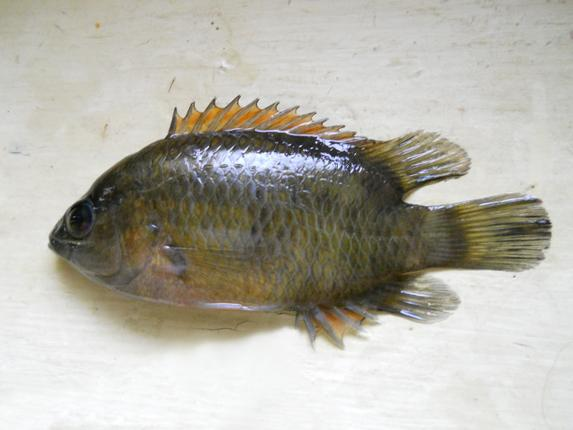

Scientific classification
- Kingdom: Animalia
- Phylum: Chordata
- Class: Actinopterygii
- Order: Anabantiformes
- Family: Pristolepididae
- Genus: Pristolepis
- Species: P. pentacantha

Binomial name
- Pristolepis pentacantha Plamoottil, 2014

= Pristolepis pentacantha =

Species of fish

Pristolepis pentacantha is a species of fish in the family Pristolepididae described from Kabani River of Kerala, India. It can be distinguished from its relative species by the following combination of characters: eyes are larger and closely set, dorsal fin carries 15–16 spines and 11 soft rays, anal fin carries 5 spines and 7 soft rays.

The fish species was discovered by Mathews Plamoottil, Assistant Professor in Zoology at the Government College, Chavara, Kollam, from Bavali, near the Karnataka border, in January 2012. Based on scientific studies and comparison with other fishes of the same species found in Kerala, it was found that P. pentacantha was a new species.

Known as aattuchemballi in local parlance, fish of the family Pristolepididae are edible. They can also be reared as an ornamental fish.

The name "pentacantha" is derived from two Greek words, "pente" meaning five and "akantha" meaning thorn, referring to the five spines in the anal fin of the fish. While the body is grayish green, the dorsal fin is reddish orange in colour.
