= Igdabatis =

Igdabatis Temporal range: Maastrichtian

Scientific classification
- Kingdom: Animalia
- Phylum: Chordata
- Class: Chondrichthyes
- Subclass: Elasmobranchii
- Order: Myliobatiformes
- Family: Myliobatidae
- Genus: †Igdabatis; Cappella, 1972

Species
- † Igdabatis indicus Prasad & Cappetta, 1993; † Igdabatis sigmodon Cappetta, 1972; † Igdabatis marmii Blanco, 2018

Genus of cartilaginous fishes

Igdabatis is a prehistoric genus of ray whose fossils are found in rocks dating from the Maastrichtian stage of Spain (Figuerola and La Maçana Formations of the Fontllonga Group), the Dukamaje Formation of Niger and the Takli, Lameta, Fatehgarh and Intertrappean Beds Formations of India.

== Classification ==
=== Species ===
Three species of Igdabatis are known from the Cretaceous of Spain, Niger, and India.

- Igdabatis sigmodon
- Igdabatis indicus
- Igdabatis marmii

== See also ==
- Flora and fauna of the Maastrichtian stage
- List of prehistoric cartilaginous fish (Chondrichthyes)
