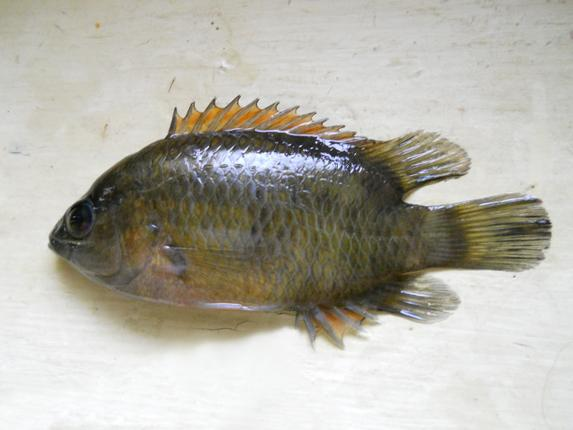
- Pristolepis pentacantha

Scientific classification
- Kingdom: Animalia
- Phylum: Chordata
- Class: Actinopterygii
- Order: Anabantiformes
- Suborder: Nandoidei
- Family: Pristolepididae; T. R. Roberts, 1989
- Genus: Pristolepis; Jerdon, 1849

Type species
- Pristolepis marginatus Jerdon, 1849

Synonyms
- Catopra Bleeker, 1851; Paranandus Day, 1865

= Pristolepis =

Pristolepis Temporal range: Early Eocene–recent

Genus of fishes

Pristolepis is a genus of fish in the family Pristolepididae, and a member of the order Anabantiformes. It is native to freshwater habitats in Southeast Asia and India's Western Ghats.

Their relationship to other members of the order was previously uncertain, with the 5th edition of Fishes of the World placing the family outside the order, alongside the Nandidae and Pristolepididae, in an unnamed and unranked but monophyletic clade. However, they are now placed in the anantiform suborder Nandoidei. Alongside the Nandidae, they are commonly known as "Asian leaffish".

Potentially the oldest member of the family is the fossil genus Palaeopristolepis from the Bambanbor Formation of India, which is part of the Intertrappean Beds. This formation was previously dated to the latest Cretaceous, but is now thought to only date to the Early Eocene. However, the attribution of this genus to this family is questionable.

== Species ==
There are currently eight recognized species in this genus:

- Pristolepis fasciata (Bleeker, 1851) (Malayan leaffish)
- Pristolepis grootii (Bleeker, 1852) (Indonesian leaffish)
- Pristolepis malabarica (Günther, 1864)
- Pristolepis marginata Jerdon, 1849 (Malabar leaffish)
- Pristolepis pauciradiata Plamoottil & Win, 2017 (Myanmar leaffish)
- Pristolepis pentacantha Plamoottil, 2014 (Wayanad leaffish)
- Pristolepis procerus Plamoottil, 2017 (Deep-bodied leaffish)
- Pristolepis rubripinnis Britz, Krishna Kumar & Baby, 2012

The fossil Palaeopristolepis contains two species from the same formation and locality, P. feddeni and P. chiplonkari.
