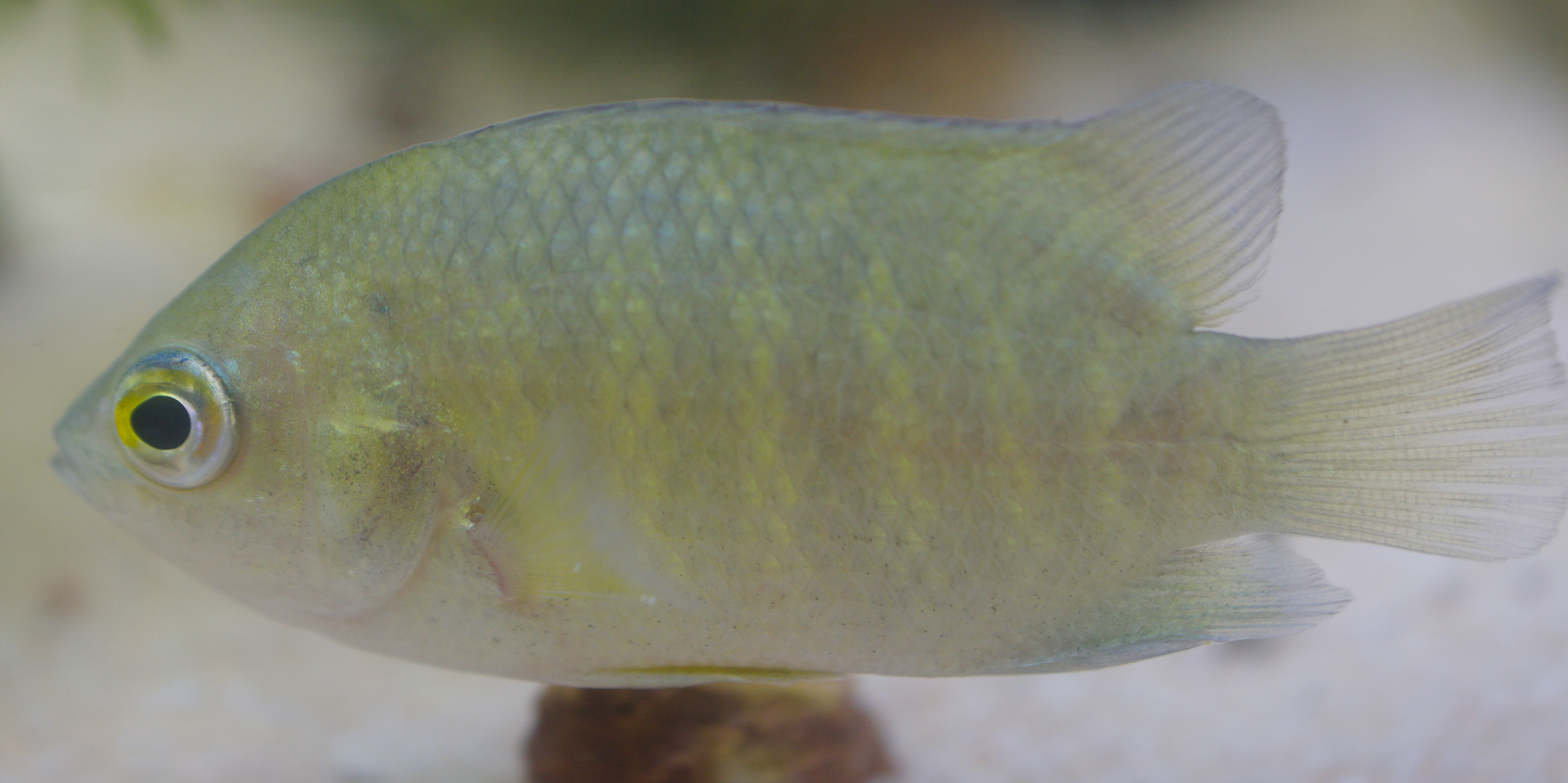

Conservation status
- Least Concern (IUCN 3.1)

Scientific classification
- Kingdom: Animalia
- Phylum: Chordata
- Class: Actinopterygii
- Order: Anabantiformes
- Family: Pristolepididae
- Genus: Pristolepis
- Species: P. fasciata

Binomial name
- Pristolepis fasciata (Bleeker, 1851)

Synonyms
- Catopra fasciata Bleeker, 1851; Catopra nandoides Bleeker, 1851

= Pristolepis fasciata =

Species of fish

Pristolepis fasciatus, commonly known as the Malayan leaffish, is a fish in the family Pristolepididae. It lives in the Mekong and Chao Phraya basins in Thailand, Cambodia, Vietnam, Myanmar, the Malay Peninsula, Sumatra, and Borneo, possibly also in southern India and China.

== Anatomy and appearance ==
It can grow to 20 cm (7.9 in) total length and reaches sexual maturity at a length of 7 to 8 cm. The body is stocky, high and heavily flattened on the sides. The mouth is narrow, small and only slightly protractile (can be pushed forward). It is collected for the aquarium trade and also used as a food fish.

== Ecology ==
It commonly inhabits slow-flowing and stagnant waters in medium-sized rivers, lakes, ponds and swamps and is mainly found near the banks where there is plenty of vegetation. In the Mekong region, it migrates to flooded fields during the rainy season and back to its home waters during the dry season. It feeds on algae, parts of plants, fruits, seeds, aquatic insects and small crustaceans.
