= Pristolepis grootii =

Conservation status
- Least Concern (IUCN 3.1)

Scientific classification
- Kingdom: Animalia
- Phylum: Chordata
- Class: Actinopterygii
- Order: Anabantiformes
- Family: Pristolepididae
- Genus: Pristolepis
- Species: P. grootii

Binomial name
- Pristolepis grootii (Bleeker, 1852)

Synonyms
- Catopra grootii Bleeker, 1852; Pristolepis grootei (Bleeker, 1852)

Species of fish

Pristolepis grootii, commonly known as the Indonesian leaffish, is a fish native to streams of the Indonesian islands of Sumatra, Bangka, Belitung and Borneo, and Thailand. It is part of the first Western Indonesian and Sulawesi Freshwater fish species recorded by December 31, 1991 along with another 963 species. Further research lead to the discovery of other 79 fish species in the area. By May 31, 1996 deletions and additions were made revealing a grand total of 1032 known fish species in the area. The specific name honours the Dutch naturalist and ethnographer Cornelis de Groot van Embden (1817-1896).
