= Burma terrane =

Gondwana-derived Earth crust fragment

Video showing paleogeographic reconstructions from Advokaat and van Hinsbergen 2024, demonstrating the rifting of the West Burma terrane off of Australia during the Jurassic and its subsequent movement northward and collision with India and Asia during the Cenozoic

The Burma terrane or West Burma block was an isolated Gondwana-derived island arc within the Tethys Ocean. The terrane was in the upper plate of the subduction zone since early Cretaceous. It collided with Insular India during the Paleocene and continued to be pushed northwards, eventually colliding with mainland Asia. Much of western Myanmar consists of the former Burma Terrane, hence the name "West Burma block".

For a long time it was assumed that it was part of Eurasia since the Mesozoic, but more recent geochronological studies suggest that it was located near the northwestern Australia margin in the Late Triassic. Paleomagnetic data indicate that the block was at equatorial latitudes on a plate separate from Eurasia from the Cretaceous until the late Eocene. It is suggested that since the Cretaceous, the block was located north of the Andaman Islands in the forearc of the Sunda Trench subduction zone.

Many of the small animals and plants that inhabited the Burma Terrane during the mid-Cretaceous are well-documented due to their exquisite preservation in Burmese amber. Many of these animals were likely endemic to the archipelago due to its isolation at the time, providing a rare comprehensive example of an insular fauna from the Mesozoic. It has been inferred that most of these animals had Gondwanan origins, and that the Burma Terrane may have played an important biogeographic role by serving as a connection by transporting Gondwanan lineages northwards.

== See also ==
- Hațeg Island, another Cretaceous island with a well-documented insular fauna
