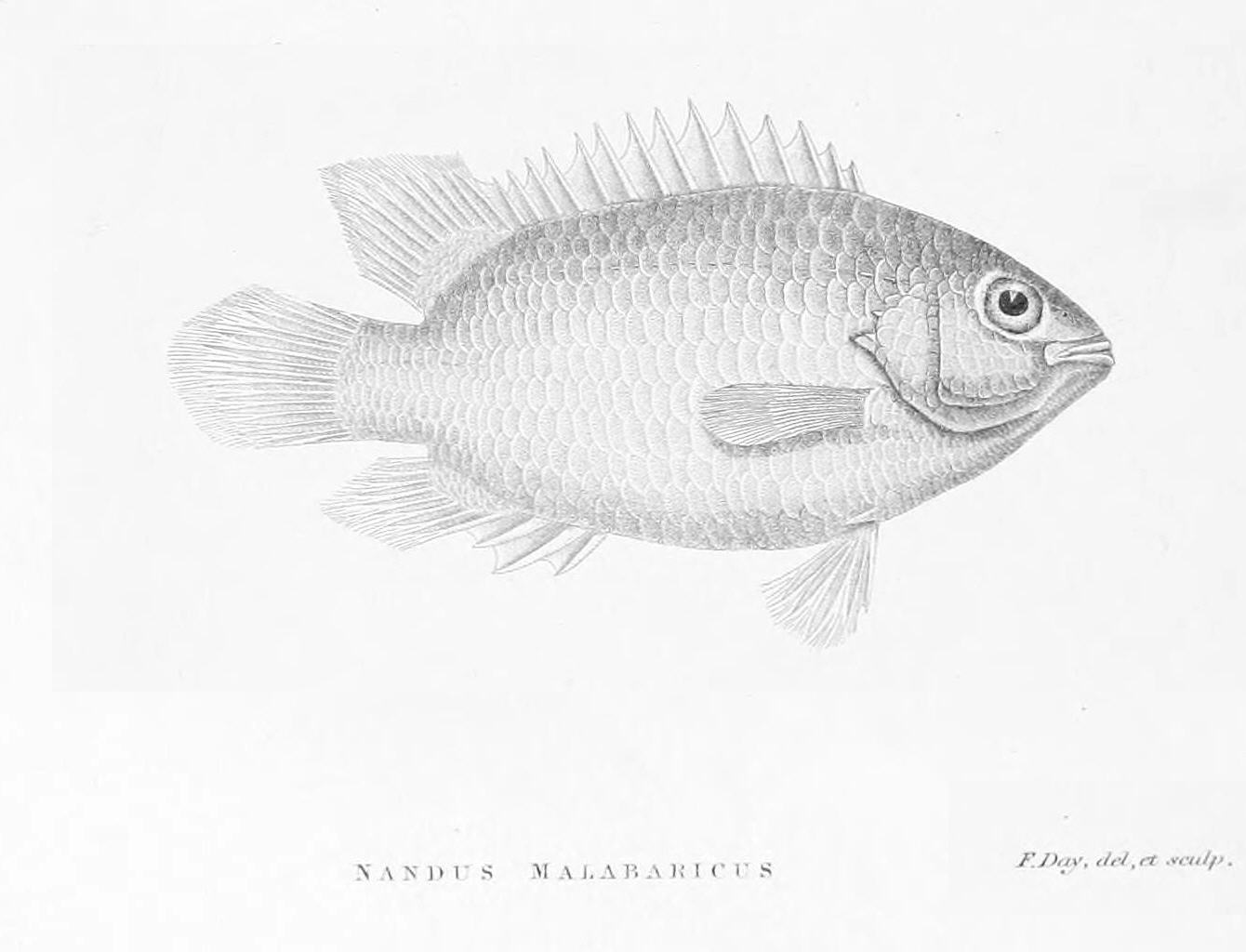

Conservation status
- Least Concern (IUCN 3.1)

Scientific classification
- Kingdom: Animalia
- Phylum: Chordata
- Class: Actinopterygii
- Order: Anabantiformes
- Family: Pristolepididae
- Genus: Pristolepis
- Species: P. marginata

Binomial name
- Pristolepis marginata (Jerdon, 1849)

Synonyms
- Catopra malabarica Günther, 1864

= Pristolepis marginata =

Species of fish

The Malabar Leaffish (Pristolepis marginata) is a species of freshwater fish in the family Pristolepididae. It lives in the Western Ghats in India.
