= Indophis =

Indophis Temporal range: Late Cretaceous, 72.2–66 Ma

Scientific classification
- Kingdom: Animalia
- Phylum: Chordata
- Class: Reptilia
- Order: Squamata
- Suborder: Serpentes
- Family: †Nigerophiidae
- Genus: †Indophis; Rage & Prasad, 1992

Type species
- Indophis sahnii Rage & Prasad, 1992

Species
- Indophis sahnii Rage & Prasad, 1992; Indophis fanambinana Pritchard et al. 2014

Extinct genus of snakes

Indophis (lit. 'Indian snake') is an extinct genus of nigerophiid snake. The type species Indophis sahnii lived during Late Cretaceous (Maastrichtian) in what is now Intertrappean Beds of India. The only other species, Indophis fanambinana, is known from the Maastrichtian Maevarano Formation in Mahajanga Basin, Madagascar.
