= Lomatus =

Lomatus hislopi

Scientific classification
- Kingdom: Animalia
- Phylum: Arthropoda
- Clade: Pancrustacea
- Class: Insecta
- Order: Coleoptera
- Suborder: Polyphaga
- Infraorder: Elateriformia
- Family: Buprestidae
- Genus: Lomatus; Murray, 1860
- Species: L. hislopi

Binomial name
- Lomatus hislopi Murray, 1860

Genus of beetles

Lomatus is an extinct genus of buprestid beetles that is known from Late Cretaceous(Maastrichtian) of Intertrappean Beds of Nagpur district in Maharashtra, India. the only species in the genus is Lomatus hislopi. It is one of the most well known Cretaceous insects from Indian subcontinent, alongside Meristos.

== Discovery and naming ==
The holotype of Lomatus is only a single, nearly complete, elytron that was discovered in Intertrappean Beds in Nagur region of Maharashtra, the specimen was collected by Dr. Rawes, alongside the several other beetle specimens.

Later in 1860, A. Murray described the partial elytron as a new genus and species of buprestid, Lomatus hislopi. The generic name Lomatus is derived from the Greek word λῶμα, meaning "a Margin", in reference to its margined elytra. The specific name hislopi is in honour of Mr. Stephen Hislop, after the discoveries in geology he made in Nagpur district alongside his colleagues Mr. Hunter.

== Description ==
The elytron of Lomatus is around 5 lin long and 1 ¼ lin wide.

== Classification ==
Lomatus is classified as a buprestid.
