= Naskal =

- Village
- Nickname: Naskanti
- Location in Telangana, India Naskal (India)
- Coordinates: 18.17146°N 78.547629°E
- Country: India
- State: Telangana
- District: Medak
- Metro: Medak district

Government
  - Body: Mandal Office

Languages
  - Official: Telugu
- Time zone: UTC+5:30 (IST)
- PIN: 502102
- Area code: 08452
- Vehicle registration: TS
- Lok Sabha constituency: medak
- Vidhan Sabha constituency: medak
- Planning agency: Panchayat
- Civic agency: Mandal Office

Naskal is a village and panchayat in Medak district, Telangana, India. It falls under Ramayampet mandal.

== Politics ==
Medak Lok Sabha constituency is one of the 17 Lok Sabha (Lower House of the Parliament) constituencies in Telangana state in India.
