= Adalatherium =

Adalatherium Temporal range: Late Cretaceous (Maastrichtian) 70–66 Ma
- Restoration of the skull in lateral view

Scientific classification
- Kingdom: Animalia
- Phylum: Chordata
- Class: Mammalia
- Clade: †Gondwanatheria
- Family: †Adalatheriidae; Krause et al, 2020
- Genus: †Adalatherium; Krause et al, 2020
- Species: †A. hui

Binomial name
- †Adalatherium hui Krause et al, 2020

Extinct genus of mammals

Adalatherium (Adàla, 'crazy' in Malagasy and therium, 'beast' in Greek) is an extinct gondwanatherian that lived in Madagascar during the Maastrichtian stage of the Late Cretaceous. The discovery of the first nearly-complete skeleton from the Maevarano Formation was announced in April 2020.

== Description ==
Although the only known fossil is believed to be from a subadult individual, it had a large skull reaching 8.4 centimetres (3.3 in) long. Its body length was about 52 centimetres (20 in) and the body mass is estimated between 1.775–5.218 kilograms (3.91–11.50 lb), making it one the largest known Mesozoic mammals. It is depicted in reconstructions as being built somewhat like a badger. Its skeleton is the most complete of any Gondwanan Mesozoic mammal. Additionally, the front of the skull contains more foramina than any known mammal except Vincelestes.

The teeth of Adalatherium had simple radial enamel with a schmelzmuster consisting of only one layer. The interprismatic matrix was anastomosing around the enamel prisms, which were small and not decussating.

== Palaeoecology ==
Potential predators of Adalatherium included Majungasaurus, Masiakasaurus, Miadanasuchus, Mahajangasuchus, and Madtsoia madagascariensis. In turn, it may have eaten roots or other plant material.
