= Litakis =

Litakis Temporal range: Maastrichtian

Scientific classification
- Domain: Eukaryota
- Kingdom: Animalia
- Phylum: Chordata
- Class: Reptilia
- Order: Squamata
- Genus: †Litakis; Estes, 1964

Type species
- †Litakis gilmorei Estes, 1964

Extinct genus of lizards

Litakis is an extinct genus of lizard from the Late Cretaceous of Wyoming. It was named in 1964 by American paleontologist Richard Estes for partial jaw bones found in the Lance Formation showing unique tooth anatomy, stored in the collections of the University of California Museum of Paleontology. The uniqueness of the tooth anatomy led Estes to suggest it was possibly related to Cteniogenys and a questionable member of Eolacertilia, though it would be the youngest member of the group.
