= Kharmerungulatum =

Kharmerungulatum Temporal range: Late Cretaceous Maastrichtian

Scientific classification
- Kingdom: Animalia
- Phylum: Chordata
- Class: Mammalia
- Clade: Eutheria
- Genus: †Kharmerungulatum; Prasad et al., 2007

Species
- †K. vanvaleni Prasad et al., 2007 (type)

Extinct family of mammals

Kharmerungulatum is an extinct genus of herbivorous mammal from the Late Cretaceous (Maastrichtian) Intertrappean Beds of Madhya Pradesh, India. Its specific epithet honors Leigh Van Valen. It was described as one of the earliest known condylarths.
