= Deccanolestes =

Deccanolestes Temporal range: Maastrichtian–Paleocene

Scientific classification
- Kingdom: Animalia
- Phylum: Chordata
- Class: Mammalia
- Infraclass: Eutheria
- Genus: Deccanolestes Prasad & Sahni, 1988

Species
- D. hislopi Prasad & Sahni, 1988 (type); D. robustus Prasad, Jaeger, Sahni, Gheerbrandt & Khajuria, 1994; D. narmadensis Prasad, Verma, Gheerbrant, Goswami, Khosla, Parmar, & A. Sahni, 2010

Genus of mammals (fossil)

Deccanolestes is an extinct genus of scansorial, basal euarchontan from the Late Cretaceous (Maastrichtian) and Paleocene Intertrappean Beds of Andhra Pradesh, India.

== Taxonomy ==
Deccanolestes may be closely related to Sahnitherium. Deccanolestes has been referred to Palaeoryctidae in the past, but recent evidence has shown that it is either the most basal euarchontan, as an early adapisoriculid, or as a stem-afrotherian.

== Species ==
Deccanolestes hislopi is based on an isolated first upper molar (VPL/JU/NKIM/10). A third molar, a lower third premolar, various other isolated teeth, and some postcranial remains have been referred to it.

Deccanolestes robustus is based on an isolated lower first molar. Isolated teeth and some ankle remains have also been referred to it.

Deccanolestes narmadensis is based on an isolated rear molar.

Alongside Bharattherium, Deccanolestes is among the two mammal taxa that survived the KT event in India.
