= Sudamericidae =

Sudamericidae Temporal range: Late Cretaceous to Miocene 70.6–17.5 Ma

Scientific classification
- Domain: Eukaryota
- Kingdom: Animalia
- Phylum: Chordata
- Class: Mammalia
- Clade: †Gondwanatheria
- Family: †Sudamericidae; Scillato-Yané & Pascual, 1984

Genera
- †Bharattherium; †Dakshina?; †Galulatherium?; †Gondwanatherium; †Lavanify; †Patagonia?; †Sudamerica; †Vintana

Synonyms
- Gondwanatheriidae Bonaparte, 1986

Extinct family of mammals

Sudamericidae is a family of gondwanathere mammals that lived during the late Cretaceous to Miocene. Its members include Lavanify and Vintana from the Cretaceous of Madagascar, Bharattherium (=Dakshina) from the Cretaceous of India, Gondwanatherium from the Cretaceous of Argentina, Sudamerica from the Paleocene of Argentina, and unnamed forms from the Eocene of Antarctica (closely related to Sudamerica) and Cretaceous of Tanzania. More recently, Patagonia, a mammal from the Colhuehuapian stage of the Miocene of southern South America, has been suggested to be a sudamericid.

Vintana is one of the most complete gondwanathere remains, and offers an insight to the anatomy and habits of sudamericids as a whole. It possesses massive lateral flanges in its skull, and bears massive olfactory bulbs. At 20 pounds (9.1 kg), it is one of the largest Mesozoic mammals known.

== Literature cited ==
- Gurovich, Y. and Beck, R. 2009. The phylogenetic affinities of the enigmatic mammalian clade Gondwanatheria (subscription required). Journal of Mammalian Evolution 16:25–49.
- Krause, D.W., Prasad, G.V.R., von Koenigswald, W., Sahni, A. and Grine, F.E. 1997. Cosmopolitanism among gondwanan Late Cretaceous mammals (subscription required). Nature 390:504–507.
- Prasad, G.V.R. 2008. Sedimentary basins & fossil records. Pp. 90–96 in Singhvi, A.K. and Bhattacharya, A. (eds.). Glimpses of Geoscience Research in India: The Indian Report to IUGS 2004–2008. New Delhi: The Indian National Science Academy (INSA).
- Prasad, G.V.R., Verma, O., Sahni, A., Krause, D.W., Khosla, A. and Parmar, V. 2007. A new late Cretaceous gondwanatherian mammal from central India. Proceedings of the Indian National Science Academy 73(1):17–24.
- Wilson, G.P., Das Sarma, D.C. and Anantharaman, S. 2007. Late Cretaceous sudamericid gondwanatherians from India with paleobiogeographic considerations of Gondwanan mammals (subscription required). Journal of Vertebrate Paleontology 27(2):521–531.
