= Perikyma =

Growth lines of tooth enamel

Perikymata (Greek plural of περικύμα, perikyma) are incremental growth lines that appear on the surface of tooth enamel as a series of linear grooves. In anatomically modern humans, each perikyma takes approximately 6–12 days to form. Thus, the count of perikymata may be used to assess how long a tooth crown took to form. They may disappear as the enamel wears over time after the tooth erupts.

Perikymata are the expression of striae of Retzius at the surface of enamel. They can be found on all teeth, but are usually the easiest to notice on anterior teeth (incisors and canines).
