= Gondwanatheria =

Gondwanatheres Temporal range: Late Cretaceous–Miocene
- Skull of Adalatherium
- Mandible of Sudamerica

Scientific classification
- Kingdom: Animalia
- Phylum: Chordata
- Class: Mammalia
- Subclass: †Allotheria (?)
- Clade: †Gondwanatheria; Mones, 1987

Subgroups
- ?†Allostaffia; Family †Sudamericidae; †Bharattherium; †Galulatherium?; †Gondwanatherium; †Lavanify; †Patagonia?; †Sudamerica; †Vintana; Family †Ferugliotheriidae; †Ferugliotherium; †Trapalcotherium; (?) †Argentodites; (?) †Magallanodon; Family †Adalatheriidae; †Adalatherium; Family ?†Groeberiidae Patterson, 1952; †Groeberia; ?†Klohnia; ?†Epiklohnia; ?†Praedens; Family unknown; †Greniodon

Extinct group of mammals

Gondwanatheria is an extinct group of mammaliaforms that lived in parts of Gondwana, including Madagascar, India, South America, Africa, and Antarctica during the Upper Cretaceous through the Miocene (and possibly much earlier, if Allostaffia is a member of this group). Until recently, they were known only from fragmentary remains. They are generally considered to be closely related to the multituberculates and likely the euharamiyidians, well known from the Northern Hemisphere, with which they form the clade Allotheria.

== Classification ==
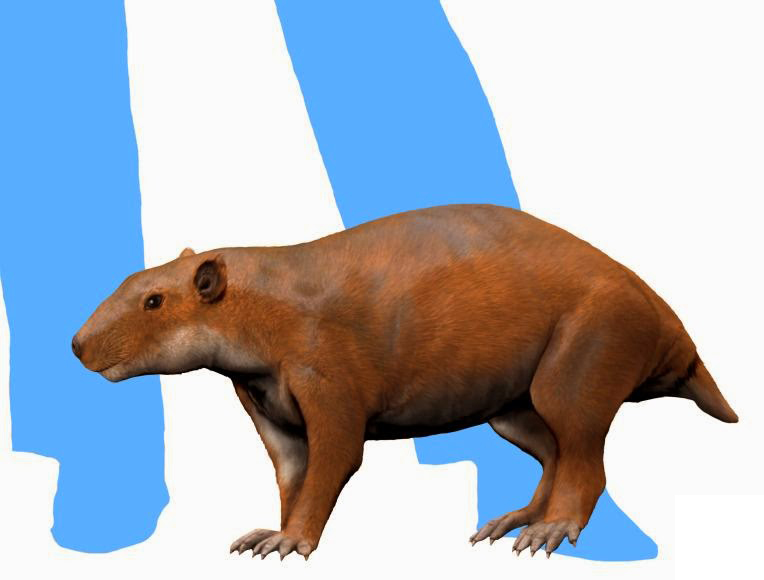
Life reconstruction of Vintana sertichi. Postcranial reconstruction is hypothetical.

For several decades the affinities of the group were not clear, being first interpreted as early xenarthrans, or "toothless" mammals similar to the modern anteater. A variety of studies have placed them as allotheres related to multituberculates, possibly even true multituberculates, closer to cimolodonts than "plagiaulacidans" are. However, a more recent study recovered them as nested among haramiyidans, rendering them as non-mammalian cynodonts. A more recently described specimen has since recovered them as allotheres closely related to multituberculates, but this was soon after followed by a study recovering them as part of Euharamiyida, which itself was placed inside crown-group Mammalia.

There are three known families within Gondwanatheria. The family Sudamericidae was named by Scillato-Yané and Pascual in 1984, and includes the vast majority of named taxa. The family Ferugliotheriidae was named by José Bonaparte in 1986, and includes one genus, Ferugliotherium, and possibly a few other forms like Trapalcotherium from the Late Cretaceous of South America. Ferugliotheriidae are considered the most basal gondawanatherians, and are sometimes recovered outside the group.

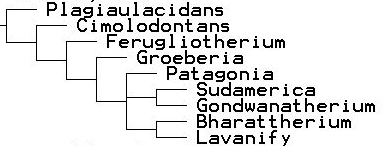
Gondwanatheria cladogram per Chimento et al. 2015.

Further fossils have come from India, Madagascar and Antarctica. A possible Ferugliotherium-like species occurs in Maastrichtian deposits of Mexico, extending the clade to North America.

The youngest gondwanatherians are known from the Eocene of South America and Antarctica. The Eocene genus Groeberia and Miocene genus Patagonia, two mammals from South America with unusual tooth morphologies usually considered metatherians, were considered by one paper to be gondwanatheres. However, their conclusions have generally not been accepted.

== Biology ==
Gondwanatheres known from cranial remains almost universally have deep, robust snouts, as befitting their specialised herbivorous lifestyle. Vintana possesses bizarre jugal flanges similar to those of xenarthrans like ground sloths, though they had a palinal (front-to-back) chewing method as in most allotheres and unlike almost any therian. Most gondwanatheres are specialised grazers, even being among the first mammals to have specialised for grass-eating long before any therians did, with the exceptions of Groeberidae and Ferugliotheriidae, which lack hypsodont teeth and therefore had more generalistic herbivorous habits.

An articulated specimen found in the Maevarano Formation offers insight to the postcranial skeleton of these animals. Among the bizarre and unique features are a mediolaterally compressed and antero-posteriorly bowed tibia, a double trochlea (grooved structure) on the talus bone, a fully developed humeral trochlea, and an unusually high number of trunk vertebrae. The new taxon has at least 19 rib-bearing (thoracic) and 11 non-rib-bearing (lumbar) vertebrae. Aside from these derived features, the Malagasy mammal has a mosaic pectoral girdle morphology: the procoracoid is lost, the coracoid is extremely well developed (into an enlarged process that contributes to half of the glenoid fossa), the interclavicle is small, and the sternoclavicular joint appears mobile. A ventrally-facing glenoid and the well-developed humeral trochlea suggest a relatively parasagittal posture for the forelimbs. Remarkable features of the hind limb and pelvic girdle include a large obturator foramen similar in size to that of therians, a large parafibula, and the presence of an epipubic bone.

The fully described animal, now named Adalatherium hui, is a comparatively large sized mammal, compared in size to a large cat. It has more erect limbs than other allotheres.

== Taxonomy ==
Order †Gondwanatheria McKenna 1971 [Gondwanatheroidea Krause & Bonaparte 1993]

- ?†Allostaffia
- †Adalatherium
- ?†Galulatherium
- Family †Ferugliotheriidae Bonaparte 1986
  - †Ferugliotherium windhauseni Bonaparte 1986a [Vucetichia Bonaparte 1990; Vucetichia gracilis Bonaparte 1990]
  - †Trapalcotherium matuastensis Rougier et al. 2008
  - ? †Magallanodon baikashkenke Goin et al. 2020
- Family †Sudamericidae Scillato-Yané & Pascual 1984 [Gondwanatheridae Bonaparte 1986]
  - †Greniodon sylvanicum Goin et al. 2012
  - †Vintana sertichi Krause et al. 2014
  - †Dakshina jederi Wilson, Das Sarama & Anantharaman 2007
  - †Gondwanatherium patagonicum Bonaparte 1986
  - †Sudamerica ameghinoi Scillato-Yané & Pascual 1984
  - †Lavanify miolaka Krause et al. 1997
  - †Bharattherium bonapartei Prasad et al. 2007
  - †Patagonia peregrina Pascual & Carlini 1987
  - †Galulatherium O'Connor et al. 2019
