= Sudamerica =

Sudamerica Temporal range: Mid Paleocene-Early Eocene (Peligran-Casamayoran) ~61.7–48.6 Ma
- Mandible with first and second molars

Scientific classification
- Kingdom: Animalia
- Phylum: Chordata
- Class: Mammalia
- Family: †Sudamericidae
- Genus: †Sudamerica; Scillato-Yané & Pascual, 1984
- Species: †S. ameghinoi

Binomial name
- †Sudamerica ameghinoi (Scillato-Yané & Pascual, 1984)
- Location of Sudamerica discovery: Punta Peligro, Argentina

Extinct genus of mammals

Sudamerica, literally "South America" in Spanish, is a genus of mammal from the extinct suborder Gondwanatheria that lived in Patagonia, Argentina (Salamanca Formation) and Antarctica (La Meseta Formation) from the Middle Paleocene (Peligran), just after the end of the "Age of Dinosaurs", to the Early Eocene (Casamayoran).

== Etymology ==
The genus and species were named by Scillato-Yané and R. Pascual in 1984. The genus is also known by the synonym Sudamericana and the species epithet ameghinoi refers to notable Argentinian paleontologist Florentino Ameghino.

== Description ==
The enamel of Sudamerica molariform teeth consists of a single layer of radial enamel. Similar to Gondwanatherium, this genus had high-crowned teeth, which are very useful for eating grasses. Since there is no evidence of grass in South America until later, they must also have been effective for other types of food.

== Classification ==
The type specimen of Sudamerica ameghinoi was discovered in Punta Peligro, Argentina in deposits dating to the Lower Paleocene period. In 1999, a near complete lower jaw (dentary) was found.

The position of gondwanatherians within the class Mammalia is not yet clear.
