= Gondwanatherium =

Gondwanatherium Temporal range: Campanian-Maastrichtian ~72–66 Ma

Scientific classification
- Kingdom: Animalia
- Phylum: Chordata
- Class: Mammalia
- Family: †Sudamericidae
- Genus: †Gondwanatherium; Bonaparte, 1986
- Species: †G. patagonicum

Binomial name
- †Gondwanatherium patagonicum Bonaparte, 1986

Extinct family of mammals

Gondwanatherium is a genus of stem-mammal from the extinct suborder Gondwanatheria that lived in Patagonia, South America during the "Age of Dinosaurs", specifically during the Late Cretaceous (Campanian to Maastrichtian epochs).

== Description ==
The genus and species were named by the Argentinian paleontologist José Bonaparte in 1986. Gondwanatherium means Gondwana beast. The position of gondwanatherians within class Mammalia is not yet clear. The type species Gondwanatherium patagonicum was discovered in Los Alamitos Formation, Río Negro Province, Patagonia, Argentina in deposits dating to the Upper Cretaceous period.

Though earlier than Sudamerica, Gondwanatherium is considered more anatomically derived (advanced). Thus, an ancestral lineage outlived their later, more specialized descendants. It is estimated to have weighed ~2.4 kg.

== Sources ==
- José F. Bonaparte. (1986) "Sobre Mesungulatum houssayi y nuevos mamíferos Cretácicos de Patagonia, Argentina." Actas Congr. Argent. Paleontol. Bioestratigr. 4, pages 48–61. (Spanish, with an English abstract)
- Malcolm C. McKenna and Susan K. Bell. (1997) "Classification of Mammals Above the Species Level". Columbia University Press. (ISBN 0-231-11012-X)
- Much of this information has been derived from MESOZOIC MAMMALS: Gondwanatheria, an Internet directory.
