= Pisdurodon =

Pisdurodon Temporal range: Paleocene

Scientific classification
- Domain: Eukaryota
- Kingdom: Animalia
- Phylum: Chordata
- Class: Actinopterygii
- Order: Tetraodontiformes
- Genus: †Pisdurodon; Jain & Sahni, 1983

Extinct genus of fishes

Pisdurodon is an extinct genus of prehistoric bony fish that lived during the Paleocene epoch.

== See also ==
- Prehistoric fish
- List of prehistoric bony fish
