= Hypsodont =

Pattern of dentition with high-crowned teeth

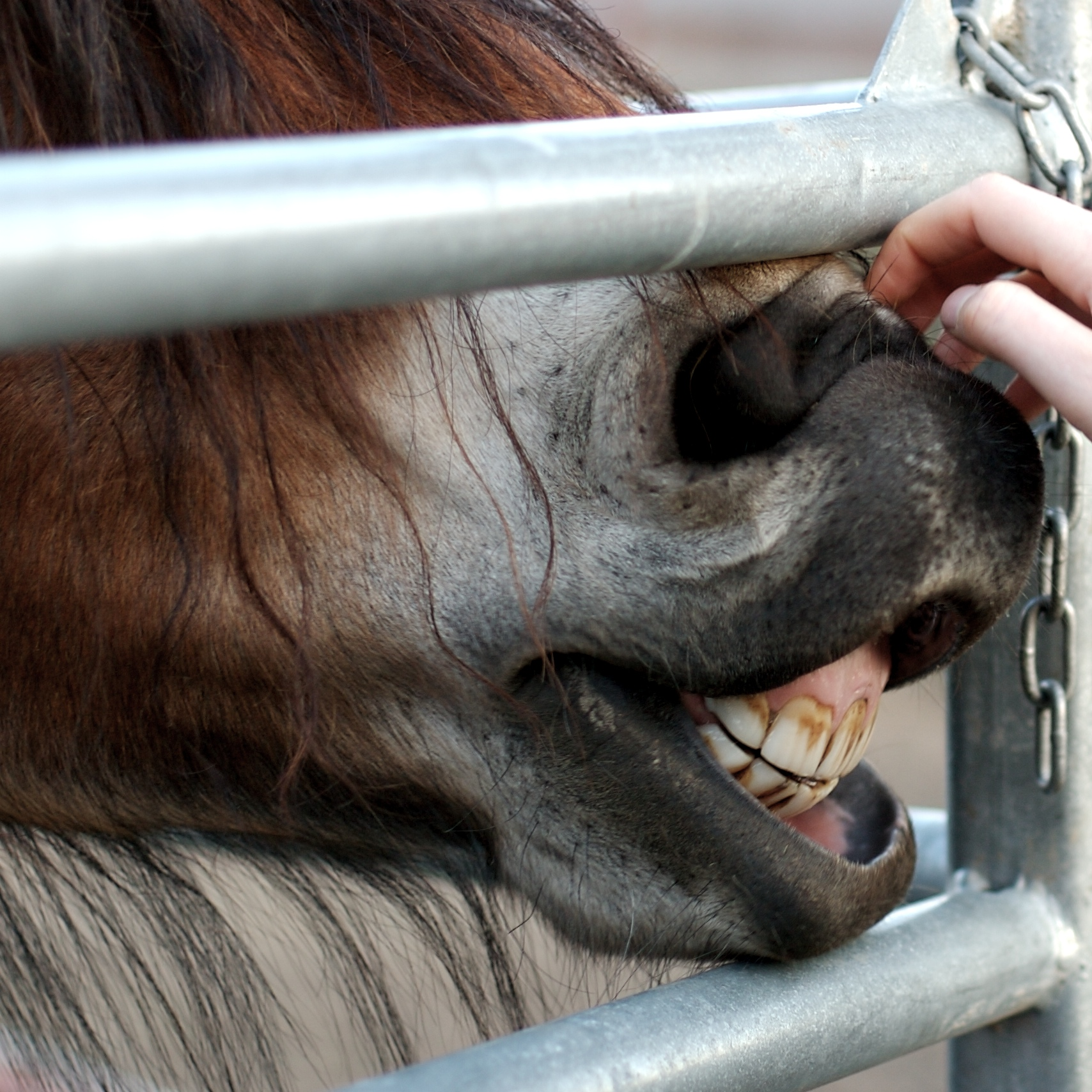
Horse teeth

Hypsodont is a pattern of dentition characterized by high crowns, providing extra material for wear. Examples of animals with hypsodont dentition are cattle, horses, and deer. These animals will pick up gritty, fibrous material such as dirt into their mouth while grazing grass, and thus wear down their dentition more quickly than a select diet. The opposite condition is called brachydont.

== Evolution ==
Since the morphology of the hypsodont tooth is suited to a more abrasive diet, hypsodonty was thought to have evolved concurrently with the spread of grasslands. Grass contains phytoliths, silica-rich granules, which wear away dental tissue more quickly. Analysis has shown, however, that the development of this morphology is out of sync with the spread and flourishing of grasslands. Instead, the ingestion of grit and soil is hypothesized to be the primary driver of hypsodonty, a hypothesis termed the grit, not grass hypothesis.

== Morphology ==
Hypsodont dentition is characterized by:

- high-crowned teeth
- A rough, flattish occlusal surface adapted for crushing and grinding
- Cementum both above and below the gingival line
- Enamel which covers the entire length of the body and likewise extends past the gum line
- The cementum and the enamel invaginate into the thick layer of dentin

A mammal may have exclusively hypsodont molars or have a mix of dentitions.

== Examples ==
Hypsodonty is observed both in the fossil record and the modern world. It is a characteristic of large clades (equids) as well as subspecies level specialization. For example, the Sumatran rhinoceros and the Javan rhinoceros both have brachydont, lophodont cheek teeth whereas the Indian rhinoceros has hypsodont dentition.

Examples of extant animals with hypsodont dentition include:

- Cows
- Horses
- Deer

At least two lineages of allotheres, Taeniolabidoidea and Gondwanatheria, developed hypsodont teeth, the latter being probably among the first mammals to be able to process grass.

== See also ==
- Brachydont
- Lophodont
- Dental formula
- Polyphyodont
