= David W. Krause =

Canadian palaeontologist

David W. Krause is a Canadian-born vertebrate paleontologist currently working as Senior Curator of Vertebrate Paleontology at the Denver Museum of Nature and Science, which he joined in 2016. Prior to that he was a Distinguished Service Professor in the Department of Anatomical Sciences at Stony Brook University, where he was employed for 34 years. His work primarily focuses on fossils from the Cretaceous period of Madagascar, and he often travels to the island to uncover new fossils. He is most famous for his discoveries of Majungasaurus crenatissimus and Beezlebufo ampinga. Rapetosaurus krausei, another dinosaur from Madagascar, is named in his honor. Krause is also the founder of the Madagascar Ankizy Fund, which is dedicated to educating and providing healthcare for poor children in Madagascar. He has been a National Geographic Explorer since 1983.
