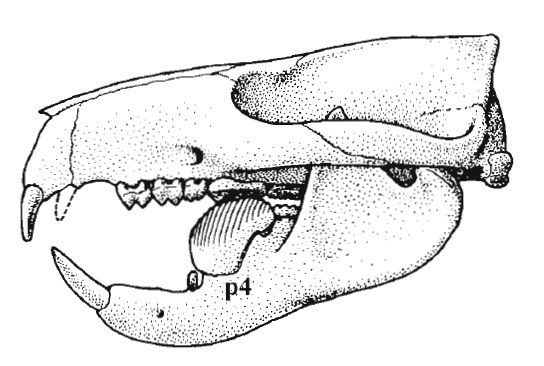
- Skull of Ptilodus (Multituberculata)
- Skull of Adalatherium (Gondwanatheria)

Scientific classification
- Kingdom: Animalia
- Phylum: Chordata
- Class: Mammalia
- Clade: Theriiformes
- Subclass: †Allotheria; Marsh, 1880

Subgroups
- †Camptomus; †Fractinus; †?Cifelliodon; †Megaconus; †Kermackodon; †Gondwanatheria; ?†Haramiyida; †Multituberculata

= Allotheria =

Allotheria Temporal range: Middle Jurassic–Eocene Possible Late Triassic record

Extinct subclass of mammals

Skull of Xianshou, a euharamiyidan

Allotheria (from Ancient Greek αλλός (allós), meaning "other", and θηρίον (theríon), meaning "beast") is an extinct clade of theriiform mammals known from the Mesozoic and early Cenozoic. Shared characteristics of the group are the presence of lower molariform teeth equipped with longitudinal rows of cusps and enlarged incisors. Typically, the canine teeth are also lost. Allotheria includes Multituberculata, Gondwanatheria (which may be part of Multituberculata, as the sister group to Cimolodonta), and probably Haramiyida, (sometimes only including Euharamiyida) although some studies have recovered haramiyidans to be basal mammaliaforms unrelated to multituberculates. Allotherians are often placed as crown group mammals, more closely related to living marsupials and placentals (Theria) than to monotremes or eutriconodonts, though some studies place the entirety of Allotheria outside of crown Mammalia.
