= List of non-avian theropod type specimens =

This list of non-avian theropod type specimens is a list of fossils that are the official standard-bearers for inclusion in the Mesozoic species and genera of the dinosaur clade Theropoda, which includes the carnivorous dinosaurs like Tyrannosaurus and Velociraptor, their herbivorous relatives like the therizinosaurs, and birds. Type specimens are those that are definitionally members of biological taxa, and additional specimens can only be "referred" to these taxa if an expert deems them sufficiently similar to the type. Theropods have been found all over the globe, and are alive today as birds.

== The list ==
Species	Genus	Nickname	Catalogue number	Institution	Age	Unit	Country	Notes	Images
Abelisaurus comahuensis	Abelisaurus		MC 11098	Museo de Cipolleti	Maastrichtian	Allen Formation	Argentina		Reconstructed skull of Abelisaurus comahuensis, with bones from the type specimen
Acheroraptor temertyorum	Acheroraptor		ROM 63777	Royal Ontario Museum	Upper Maastrichtian	Hell Creek Formation	United States		Cast of the type specimen of Acheroraptor temertyorum
Achillesaurus manazzonei	Achillesaurus		MACN-PV-RN 1116	Museo Argentino de Ciencias Naturales "Bernardino Rivadavia"	Santonian	Bajo de la Carpa Formation	Argentina		
Achillobator giganticus	Achillobator		MNUFR-15	Mongolian National University	Santonian-Campanian	Bayan Shireh Formation	Mongolia		Skeletal reconstruction of Achillobator giganticus illustrating holotype material
Acrocanthosaurus atokensis	Acrocanthosaurus		Holotype: OMNH 10146 Paratype: OMNH 10147	Oklahoma Museum of Natural History	Albian-Aptian	Antlers Formation	United States		Skeletal diagrams of Acrocanthosaurus atokensis specimens. The holotype is the topmost image, while the second image from the top is the paratype
Adasaurus mongoliensis	Adasaurus		IGM 100/20	Mongolian Institute of Geology	Late Cretaceous	Nemegt Formation	Mongolia		Reconstructed skull of Adasaurus mongoliensis. Material in white indicates known material from the holotype
Aepyornithomimus tugrikinensis	Aepyornithomimus		MPC-D 100/130	Institute of Paleontology and Geology, Mongolian Academy of Sciences	Campanian	Djadokhta Formation	Mongolia		Holotype metatarsals of Aepyornithomimus tugrikinensis
Aerosteon riocoloradensis	Aerosteon		MCNA-PV-3137	Museo de Ciencias Naturales y Antropológicas (J. C. Moyano) de Mendoza	Santonian	Anacleto Formation	Argentina		Cast of the holotype left ilium of Aerosteon riocoloradensis
Afromimus tenerensis	Afromimus		MNBH GAD112	Musée National Boubou Hama	Aptian-Albian	Elrhaz Formation	Niger		
Afrovenator abakensis	Afrovenator		UC OBA 1	University of Chicago	Middle Jurassic	Tiouaren Formation	Niger		Reconstruction of the skull of Afrovenator abakensis based on the holotype
Albertavenator curriei	Albertavenator		TMP 1993.105.0001	Royal Tyrell Museum of Paleontology	Earliest Maastrichtian	Horsethief Member, Horseshoe Canyon Formation	Canada		Illustration of the holotype frontal of Albertavenator curriei
Albertonykus borealis	Albertonykus		TMP 2001.45.91	Royal Tyrell Museum of Paleontology	Maastrichtian	Horseshoe Canyon Formation	Canada		
Albertosaurus arctunguis	Albertosaurus		ROM 807	Royal Ontario Museum	Campanian-Maastrichtian	Horseshoe Canyon Formation	Canada	Synonymous with Albertosaurus sarcophagus	
Albertosaurus sarcophagus	Albertosaurus		CMN 5600	Canadian Museum of Nature	Campanian-Maastrichtian	Horseshoe Canyon Formation	Canada		CMN 5600
Albinykus baatar	Albinykus		IGM 100/3004	Mongolian Institute of Geology	Santonian-Campanian	Javkhlant Formation	Mongolia		
Alectrosaurus olseni	Alectrosaurus		AMNH 6368	American Museum of Natural History	Upper Cretaceous	Iren Dabasu Formation	Mongolia		Holotype right foot of Alectrosaurus olseni
Alioramus altai	Alioramus		IGM 100/1844	Mongolian Institute of Geology	Maastrichtian	Nemegt Formation	Mongolia		Holotype skull bones of Alioramus altai
Alioramus remotus	Alioramus		PIN 3141/1	Paleontological Institute, Russian Academy of Sciences	Late Cretaceous		Mongolia		
Allosaurus europaeus	Allosaurus		ML415	Museu da Lourinhã	Kimmeridgian	Porto Novo Member, Lourinhã Formation	Portugal		Holotype skull (C) of Allosaurus europaeus
Allosaurus fragilis	Allosaurus		YPM 1930	Peabody Museum of Natural History	Upper Jurassic	Lower Morrison Formation	Colorado		
Allosaurus jimmadseni	Allosaurus		DINO 11541	Dinosaur National Monument	Kimmeridgian	Morrison Formation	United States		Holotype skull (B) of Allosaurus jimmadseni
Almas ukhaa	Almas		IGM 100/1323	Mongolian Institute of Geology	Campanian	Djadokhta Formation	Mongolia		
Alnashetri cerropoliciensis	Alnashetri		MPCA-477	Museo Provincial Carlos Ameghino	Cenomanian-Turonian	Candeleros Formation	Argentina		
Altispinax dunkeri	Altispinax		NHMUK R1828	Natural History Museum, London	Berriasian-Valanginian	Hasting Beds Group	United Kingdom		Illustration of the holotype specimen of Altispinax dunkeri
Alvarezsaurus calvoi	Alvarezsaurus		MUCPv 54	Museo de Ciencias Naturales, Universidad Nacional del Comahue	Coniacian-Santonian	Bajo de la Carpa Member, Río Colorado Formation	Argentina		Skeletal diagram of Alvarezsaurus calvoi indicating holotype elements
Alxasaurus elesitaiensis	Alxasaurus		IVPP 88402	Institute of Vertebrate Paleontology and Paleoanthropology	Albian	Bayin Gobi Formation	China		Holotype dentary of Alxasaurus elesitaiensis
Ambopteryx longibrachium	Ambopteryx		IVPP V24192	Institute of Vertebrate Paleontology and Paleoanthropology	Oxfordian		China		
Anchiornis huxleyi	Anchiornis		IVPP V14378	Institute of Vertebrate Paleontology and Paleoanthropology	Oxfordian	Tiaojishan Formation	China		
Aniksosaurus darwini	Aniksosaurus		MDT-PV 1/48	Museo Desiderio Torres	Late Cretaceous	Bajo Barreal Formation	Argentina		Holotype tibia (C and D) of Aniksosaurus darwini
Anomalipes zhaoi	Anomalipes		ZCDM V0020	Zhucheng Dinosaur Museum	Upper Cretaceous	Wangshi Group	China		Holotype pedal elements of Anomalipes zhaoi
Anserimimus planinychus	Anserimimus		IGM 100/300	Mongolian Institute of Geology	Maastrichtian	Nemegt Formation	Mongolia		
Antrodemus valens	Antrodemus		USNM 218	National Museum of Natural History	Upper Jurassic	Morrison Formation	United States	Nomen dubium	
Anzu wyliei	Anzu		CM 78000	Carnegie Museum of Natural History	Upper Maastrichtian	Hell Creek Formation	United States		Holotype elements (Left: C-F, I-L. Right: F-G) of Anzu wyliei
Aoniraptor libertatem	Aoniraptor		MPCA-Pv 804/1 to 804/25	Museo Provincial "Carlos Ameghino"	Cenomanian-Turonian	Huincul Formation	Argentina		
Aorun zhaoi	Aorun		IVPP V15709	Institute of Vertebrate Paleontology and Paleoanthropology	Oxfordian-Callovian	Shishugou Formation	China		
Apatoraptor pennatus	Apatoraptor		TMP 1993.051.0001	Royal Tyrell Museum of Paleontology	Campanian-Maastrichtian	Horsethief Member, Horseshoe Canyon Formation	Canada		Holotype skeleton of Apatoraptor pennatus
Appalachiosaurus montgomeriensis	Appalachiosaurus		RMM 6670	McWane Science Center	Campanian	Demopolis Formation	United States		
Aratasaurus museunacionali	Aratasaurus		MPSC R 2089	Museu de Paleontologia, Universidade Regional do Cariri	Aptian	Romualdo Formation	Brazil		Holotype leg bones of Aratasaurus museunacionali
Archaeopteryx albersdoerferi	Archaeopteryx	The Daiting specimen	SNSB BSPG VN-2010/1	Bayerische Staatssammlung für Paläontologie und Geologie	Lower Tithonian	Mörnsheim Formation	Germany		The Daiting specimen, the holotype of Archaeopteryx albersdoerferi
Archaeopteryx lithographica	Archaeopteryx	The London specimen	NHMUK 37001	Natural History Museum, London	Lower Tithonian	Solnhofen Limestone	Germany		Replica of the London specimen, the neotype of Archaeopteryx lithographica
Archaeopteryx siemensii	Archaeopteryx	The Berlin specimen	HMN 1880/81	Museum für Naturkunde	Lower Tithonian	Solnhofen Limeston	Germany		The Berlin specimen, the holotype specimen of Archaeopteryx siemensii
Archaeornithoides deinosauriscus	Archaeornithoides		ZPAL MgD-II/29	Institute of Paleobiology, Polish Academy of Sciences	Late Santonian-Early Campanian	Djadokhta Formation	Mongolia		Reconstruction of the skull of Archaeornithoides deinosauriscus. Holotype material is shown in brown
Archaeornithomimus asiaticus	Archaeornithomimus		AMNH 6565	American Museum of Natural History	Cenomanian?	Iren Dabasu Formation	China		
Arcovenator escotae	Arcovenator		MHNA-PV-2011.12.1, MHNA-PV-2011.12.2, MHNA.PV.2011.12.15, MHNA.PV.2011.12.5, MHNA.PV.2011.12.4, MHNA.PV.2011.12.3	Muséum d'Histoire Naturelle d'Aix-en-Provence	Late Campanian	Argiles Rutilantes Formation	France		
Aristosuchus pusilius	Aristosuchus		NHMUK R178	Natural History Museum, London	Barremian	Wessex Formation	United Kingdom		
Arkansaurus fridayi	Arkansaurus		UAM 74-16	University of Arkansas Museum	Albian-Aptian	Trinity Group	United States		
Asfaltovenator vialidadi	Asfaltovenator		MPEF PV 3440	Museo Paleontológico Egidio Feruglio	Late Toarcian-Bajocian	Cañadón Asfalto Formation	Argentina		Holotype skull of Asfaltovenator vialidadi
Atrociraptor marshalli	Atrociraptor		TMP 95.166.1	Royal Tyrell Museum of Paleontology	Upper Campanian-Lower Maastrichtian	Horseshoe Canyon Formation	Canada		Holotype skull of Atrociraptor marshalli
Aublysodon mirandus	Aublysodon		ANSP 9535	Academy of Natural Sciences of Philadelphia		Judith River Formation	United States	Type specimen now lost, might be a nomen dubium	Holotype tooth (41-45) of Aublysodon mirandus
Aucasaurus garridoi	Aucasaurus		MCF-PVPH-236	Museo Municipal Carmen Funes	Campanian	Anacleto Member, Río Colorado Formation	Argentina		Holotype braincase of Aucasaurus garridoi
Aurornis xui	Aurornis		YFGP-T5198	Yizhou Fossil and Geology Park	Middle-Late Jurassic	Tiaojishan Formation	China		
Australovenator wintonensis	Australovenator		AODF 604	Australian Age of Dinosaurs	Albian	Winton Formation	Australia		Holotype dentary of Australovenator wintonensis
Austrocheirus isasii	Austrocheirus		MPM-PV 10003	Museo Padre Molina	Campanian	Pari Aike Formation	Argentina		
Austroraptor cabazai	Austroraptor		MML-195	Museo Municipal de Lamarque	Campanian-Maastrichtian	Allen Formation	Argentina		Skeletal reconstruction of Austroraptor cabazai illustrating the holotype material
Aviatyrannis jurassica	Aviatyrannis		IPFUB Gui Th 1	Institut für Geologische Wissenschaften, Freie Universität Berlin	Kimmeridgian	Alcobaça Formation	Portugal		
Avimimus nemegtensis	Avimimus		MPC-D 102/81	Institute of Paleontology and Geology, Mongolian Academy of Sciences	Late Cretaceous	Nemegt Formation	Mongolia		
Avimimus portentosus	Avimimus		PIN 3907-1	Paleontological Institute, Russian Academy of Sciences	Upper Cretaceous	Nemegt Formation	Mongolia		
Bagaraatan ostromi	Bagaraatan		ZPAL MgD-I/108	Institute of Paleobiology, Polish Academy of Sciences	Middle Maastrichtian?	Nemegt Formation	Mongolia		Holotype left mandible of Bagaraatan ostromi
Bahariasaurus ingens	Bahariasaurus		BSP 1922 X 47	Bayerische Staatssammlung für Paläontologie und historische Geologie, München	Cenomanian	Bahariya Formation	Egypt	Type specimen was destroyed in World War II	
Balaur bondoc	Balaur		EME PV.313	Transylvanian Museum Society, Cluj-Napoca	Maastrichtian	Sebeş Formation	Romania		Holotype specimen of Balaur bondoc
Bambiraptor feinbergi	Bambiraptor	Bambi	AMNH FR 30556	American Museum of Natural History	Upper Cretaceous	Two Medicine Formation	Montana		Skeletal reconstruction of Bambiraptor feinbergi based on the holotype
Banji long	Banji		IVPP V 16896	Institute of Vertebrate Paleontology and Paleoanthropology	Upper Cretaceous	Nanxiong Formation?	China		Holotype skull of Banji long
Bannykus wulatensis	Bannykus		IVPP V25026	Institute of Vertebrate Paleontology and Paleoanthropology	Aptian	Bayingobi Formation	China		Holotype of Bannykus wulatensis
Baryonyx walkeri	Baryonyx	Claws	NHMUK VP R9951	Natural History Museum, London	Barremian	Weald Clay	United Kingdom		Holotype elements of Baryonyx walkeri
Beibeilong sinensis	Beibeilong	Baby Louie	HGM 41HIII1219	Henan Geological Museum	Cenomanian-Turonian	Gaogou Formation	China		Holotype skeleton of Beibeilong sinensis
Beipiaosaurus inexpectus	Beipiaosaurus		IVPP V11559	Institute of Vertebrate Paleontology and Paleoanthropology	Lower Cretaceous	Yixian Formation	China		Holotype elements of Beipiaosaurus inexpectus
Beishanlong grandis	Beishanlong		FRDC-GS GJ (06) 01-18	Fossil Research and Development Center, Third Geology and Mineral Resources Exploration Academy, Gansu Provincial Bureau of Geo-Exploration and Mineral Development	Aptian-Albian	Xinminpu Group	China		
Berberosaurus liassicus	Berberosaurus		MHNM-Pt9, Pt23, Pt22, Pt19, Pt21, Pt16, Pt20	Muséum d'Histoire Naturelle de Marrakech	Pliensbachian-Toarcian	Toundoute Continental Series	Morocco		
Berthasaura leopoldinae	Berthasaura		MN 7821-V	Museu Nacional, Universidade Federal do Rio de Janeiro	Aptian-Albian	Goio Erê Formation	Brazil		Skeletal reconstruction of Berthasaura leopoldinae displaying several bones from the holotype specimen
Betasuchus bredai	Betasuchus		NHMUK R 42997	Natural History Museum, London	Maastrichtian	Maastricht Formation?	Netherlands		Cast of the holotype of Betasuchus bredai
Bicentenaria argentina	Bicentenaria		MPCA 865	Museo Provincial "Carlos Ameghino"	Cenomanian	Candeleros Formation	Argentina		Holotype skull elements of Bicentenaria argentina
Bistahieversor sealeyi	Bistahieversor		NMMNH P-27469	New Mexico Museum of Natural History and Science	Campanian	Hunter Wash Member, Kirtland Formation	United States		Holotype skull of Bistahieversor sealeyi
Bonapartenykus ultimus	Bonapartenykus		MPCA 1290	Museo Provincial "Carlos Ameghino"	Campanian-Maastrichtian	Allen Formation	Argentina		
Boreonykus certekorum	Boreonykus		TMP 1989.055.0047	Royal Tyrell Museum of Paleontology	Campanian	Wapiti Formation	Canada		
Borogovia gracilicrus	Borogovia		ZPAL MgD-I/174	Institute of Paleobiology, Polish Academy of Sciences	Maastrichtian	Nemegt Formation	Mongolia		Holotype tibiotarsus of Borogovia gracilicrus
Bradycneme draculae	Bradycneme		BMNH A1588	Natural History Museum, London	Maastrichtian	Hațeg Basin	Romania		
Buitreraptor gonzalezorum	Buitreraptor		MPCA 245	Museo Provincial "Carlos Ameghino"	Cenomanian-Turonian	Candeleros Formation	Argentina		Reconstruction of Buitreraptor gonzalezorum based on the holotype skeleton
Byronosaurus jaffei	Byronosaurus		IGM 100/983	Mongolian Institute of Geology	Late Cretaceous	Djadokhta Formation	Mongolia		Skeletal reconstruction of Byronosaurus jaffei based on the holotype material
Caenagnathasia martinsoni	Caenagnathasia		CCMGE 401/12457	Chernyshev's Central Museum of Geological Exploration	Turonian	Bissekty Formation	Uzbekistan		Holotype and paratype mandibles of Caenagnathasia martinsoni
Caenagnathus collinsi	Caenagnathus		CMN 8776	Canadian Museum of Nature	Campanian	Dinosaur Park Formation	Canada		Holotype mandible of Caenagnathus collinsi
Caihong juji	Caihong		PMoL-B00175	Paleontological Museum of Liaoning	Oxfordian	Tiaojishan Formation	China		Holotype skeleton of Caihong juji
Calamosaurus foxi	Calamosaurus		BMNH R901	Natural History Museum, London	Barremian	Wealden Group	United Kingdom		Holotype vertebrae of Calamosaurus foxi
Calamospondylus oweni	Calamospondylus				Upper Barremian	Vectis Formation	United Kingdom	Type specimen has been lost	
Camarillasaurus cirugedae	Camarillasaurus		MPG-KPC1-46	Museo Paleontológico de Galve	Lower Barremian	Camarillas Formation	Spain		Holotype ribs and vertebrae of Camarillasaurus cirugedae
Camposaurus arizonensis	Camposaurus		UCMP 34498	University of California Museum of Paleontology	Lower-Middle Norian	Mesa Redondo Member, Chinle Formation	United States		Holotype ankle of Camposaurus arizonensis
Carcharodontosaurus iguidensis	Carcharodontosaurus		MNN IGU2	Musée National du Niger	Cenomanian	Echkar Formation	Niger		
Carcharodontosaurus saharicus	Carcharodontosaurus		SGM-Din 1	Ministére de l'Energie et des Mines, Rabat	Cenomanian	Kem Kem Group	Morocco		
Carnotaurus sastrei	Carnotaurus		MACN-CH 894	Museo Argentino de Ciencias Naturales "Bernardino Rivadavia"	Maastrichtian	La Colonia Formation	Argentina		Holotype skull of Carnotaurus sastrei
Caudipteryx dongi	Caudipteryx		IVPP V12344	Institute of Vertebrate Paleontology and Paleoanthropology	Barremian	Yixian Formation	China		
Caudipteryx zoui	Caudipteryx		NGMC 97-4-A	National Geological Museum of China	Barremian	Jiulongsong Member, Chaomidianzi Formation	China		Holotype skeleton of Caudipteryx zoui
Ceratonykus oculatus	Ceratonykus		MPC 100/124	Paleontological Center, Mongolian Academy of Sciences	Santonian	Baruungoyot Formation	Mongolia		
Ceratosaurus dentisulcatus	Ceratosaurus		UMNH 5278	Utah Museum of Natural History	Late Jurassic	Brushy Basin Member, Morrison Formation	United States	Possible junior synonym of Ceratosaurus nasicornis	
Ceratosaurus magnicornis	Ceratosaurus		MWC 1	Museum of Western Colorado	Late Jurassic	Brushy Basin Member, Morrison Formation	United States	Possible junior synonym of Ceratosaurus nasicornis	
Ceratosaurus nasicornis	Ceratosaurus		USNM 4735	National Museum of Natural History	Late Jurassic	Morrison Formation	United States		Holotype skeleton of Ceratosaurus nasicornis
Ceratosuchops inferodios	Ceratosuchops		IWCMS 2014.95.1-3, IWCMS 2014.95.5, IWCMS 2021.30	Dinosaur Isle Museum	Barremian	Wessex Formation	United Kingdom		Holotype skull of Ceratosuchops inferodios
Changyuraptor yangi	Changyuraptor		HG B016	Paleontological Center, Bohai University	Early Cretaceous	Yixian Formation	China		
Chenanisaurus barbaricus	Chenanisaurus		OCP DEK-GE 772	Office Cherifien des Phosphates	Maastrichtian	Ouled Abdoun Basin	Morocco		Holotype dentary of Chenanisaurus barbaricus
Chienkosaurus ceratosauroides	Chienkosaurus		IVPP V237	Institute of Vertebrate Paleontology and Paleoanthropology	Tithonian	Kuangyuan Series	China	Dubious	
Chilantaisaurus tashuikouensis	Chilantaisaurus		IVPP V2884.1	Institute of Vertebrate Paleontology and Paleoanthropology	Late Cretaceous	Ulansuhai Formation	China		
Chingkankousaurus fragilis	Chingkankousaurus		IVPP V836	Institute of Vertebrate Paleontology and Paleoanthropology	Campanian - Maastrichtian	Wangshi Series	China		
Chirostenotes pergracilis	Chirostenotes		CMN 2367	Canadian Museum of Nature	Upper Campanian	Dinosaur Park Formation	Canada		Holotype hands of Chirostenotes pergracilis
Chuandongocoelurus primitivus	Chuandongocoelurus		CCG 20010	Chengdu University of Geology	Middle Jurassic	Xiashaximiao Formation	China		
Citipati osmolskae	Citipati		IGM 100/978	Mongolian Institute of Geology	Upper Cretaceous	Djadokhta Formation	Mongolia		
Citipes elegans	Citipes		ROM 781	Royal Ontario Museum	Campanian	Dinosaur Park Formation	Canada		Holotype foot of Citipes elegans
Coelophysis bauri	Coelophysis		AMNH 7224	American Museum of Natural History	Upper Triassic	Chinle Formation	United States	Neotype	Two skeletons of Coelophysis bauri, including the neotype specimen
Coeluroides largus	Coeluroides		GSI K27/562, K27/574, K27/595	Geological Survey of India	Maastrichtian	Lameta Formation	India		
Coelurus fragilis	Coelurus		YPM 1991, 1993	Yale Peabody Museum	Upper Jurassic	Morrison Formation	United States	Syntypes	
Compsognathus longipes	Compsognathus		SNSB-BSPG AS I 563	Bavarian State Collection for Paleontology and Geology	Tithonian	Solnhofen Limestone	Germany		Cast of the holotype specimen of Compsognathus longipes
Compsosuchus solus	Compsosuchus		GSI K27/578	Geological Survey of India	Maastrichtian	Lameta Formation	India		
Concavenator corcovatus	Concavenator		MCCM-LH 6666	Museo de las Ciencias de Castilla-La Mancha	Upper Barremian	Calizas de La Huérguina Formation	Spain		Holotype of Concavenator corcovatus
Conchoraptor gracilis	Conchoraptor		MPC-D 100/20	Institute of Paleontology and Geology, Mongolian Academy of Sciences	Late Cretaceous	Barun Goyot Formation	Mongolia		
Condorraptor currumilli	Condorraptor		MPEF-PV 1672	Museo Paleontológico Egidio Feruglio	Callovian	Cañadón Asfalto Formation	Argentina		
Corythoraptor jacobsi	Corythoraptor		JPM-2015-001	Jinzhou Paleontological Museum	Campanian - Maastrichtian	Nanxiong Formation	China		Holotype of Corythoraptor jacobsi
Cristatusaurus lapparenti	Cristatusaurus		MNHN GDF 366	Muséum National d'Histoire Naturelle	Aptian	Elrhaz Formation	Niger		Holotype specimen of Cristatusaurus lapparenti
Cruxicheiros newmanorum	Cruxicheiros		WARMS G15770	Warwickshire Museum Service	Lower Bathonian	Chipping Norton Limestone	United Kingdom		Holotype femur (C-E) of Cruxicheiros newmanorum
Cryolophosaurus ellioti	Cryolophosaurus		FMNH PR1821	Field Museum of Natural History	Early Jurassic	Hanson Formation	Antarctica		Holotype skull of Cryolophosaurus ellioti
Tyrannosaurus rex	Tyrannosaurus		CM 9380	Carnegie Museum of Natural History			United States		CM 9380

== See also ==
- List of ornithopod type specimens
- List of marginocephalian type specimens
- List of thyreophoran type specimens
- List of other ornithischian type specimens
- List of Mesozoic birds
