= Necrolestes =

Necrolestes Temporal range: Early Miocene (Colhuehuapian-Santacrucian) ~21.0–17.5 Ma
- Skull of N. patagonensis

Scientific classification
- Kingdom: Animalia
- Phylum: Chordata
- Class: Mammalia
- Clade: Cladotheria
- Clade: †Meridiolestida
- Family: †Necrolestidae; Ameghino, 1891
- Genus: †Necrolestes; Ameghino, 1891

Type species
- Necrolestes patagonensis Ameghino, 1891

Species
- †N. patagonensis Ameghino, 1891; †N. mirabilis Goin et al., 2007

Extinct genus of mammals

Necrolestes (from Ancient Greek νεκρός (necrós), meaning "dead", and λῃστής (lēistḗs), meaning "robber") is an extinct genus of mammals, which lived during the Early Miocene in what is now Argentine Patagonia. It is the most recent known genus of Meridiolestida, an extinct group of mammals more closely related to therians (marsupials and placentals) than to monotremes, which were the dominant mammals in South America during the Late Cretaceous. It contains two species, N. patagonensis and N. mirabilis; the type species N. patagonensis was named by Florentino Ameghino in 1891 based on remains found by his brother, Carlos Ameghino in Patagonia. Fossils of Necrolestes have been found in the Sarmiento and Santa Cruz Formations. Its morphology suggests that it was a digging, subterranean-dwelling mole-like mammal that fed on invertebrates.

== Description ==
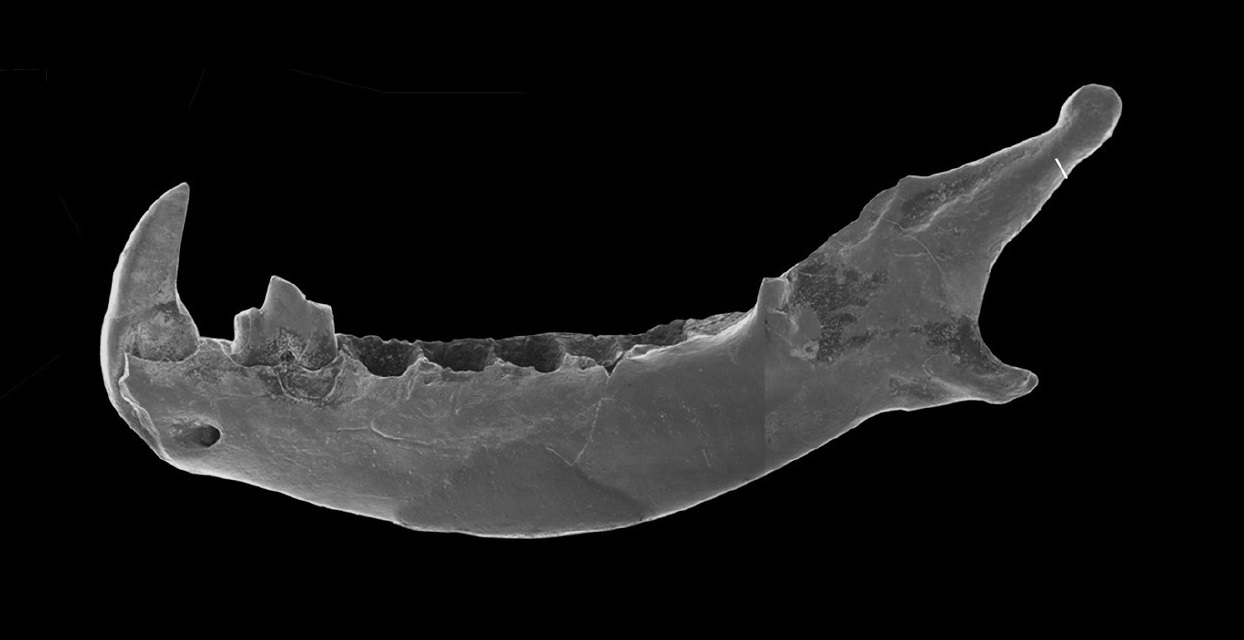
Lower jaw

About one-third of the skeleton of N. patagonensis—including most of the skull— has been found as disassociated bones of several individuals. The snout bends upwards at its end. The opening of the nasal fenestra has a septomaxilla separating the nasal and premaxilla bones, which is unknown in therian mammals, with the nasal fenestra also appearing to have ossified external nasal cartilage. Necrolestes possessed a second crus commune, and its cochleae were characterised by fewer spiral turns than most metatherians. The forelimbs have numerous characters in common with those of fossorial mammals, including a medially curved olecranon process of the ulna, and a mediolaterally compressed head of the humerus.

== Ecology ==
Necrolestes was probably a subterranean mole-like mammal that fed on invertebrates. The morphology of the snout suggests that it dug by lifting its snout upwards, similar to modern marsupial moles and golden moles, as well as by using its forelimbs. The high volume of the middle ear suggests that it had enhanced hearing of low-frequency sounds.

== Classification ==
Its classification was historically unclear due to it being highly apomorphic and having an anatomy unlike any other known mammal, living or extinct. It was thought to be a therian mammal; placement within either the marsupial lineage (Metatheria) or as a member of Eutheria would have been possible given that South America as an island had extensive lineages of both marsupial and placental mammals. However, phylogenetic analyses conducted by Rougier et al. (2012), Chimento, Agnolin and Novas (2012) and Averianov, Martin and Lopatin (2013) recovered Necrolestes in an unexpected phylogenetic position as a nontherian mammal that belonged to the clade Meridiolestida; if confirmed this would make Necrolestes the youngest known member of the group. Within Meridiolestida, Rougier et al. (2012) found Necrolestes to be particularly closely related to the genera Cronopio and Leonardus; Chimento et al. (2012) found it to be in unresolved polytomy with Cronopio, Leonardus and the clade containing all other meridiolestidans while Averianov et al. (2013) recovered Cronopio, Necrolestes and Leonardus as forming a grade at the base of Meridiolestida rather than a clade. A subsequent 2017 monograph of the skull anatomy further supported a placement within Meridiolestida.

=== Phylogeny ===
This cladogram follows the paper of Rougier, Wible, Beck and Apesteguía of 2012:

- Meridiolestida
  - - Leonardus
    - - Cronopio
      - Necrolestes
  - - Reigitherium
    - - Peligrotherium
      - - Mesungulatum
        - Coloniatherium
