= Cronopio =

Cronopio may refer to either of the following:

- Cronopio (literature), a class of literary characters
- Cronopio (mammal), a prehistoric animal
