= Dorotea Formation =

Geological formation in the Río de Las Chinas Valley, Magallanes Basin, Chile

- Stratigraphic range: Late Campanian-Maastrichtian; ~72–66 Ma
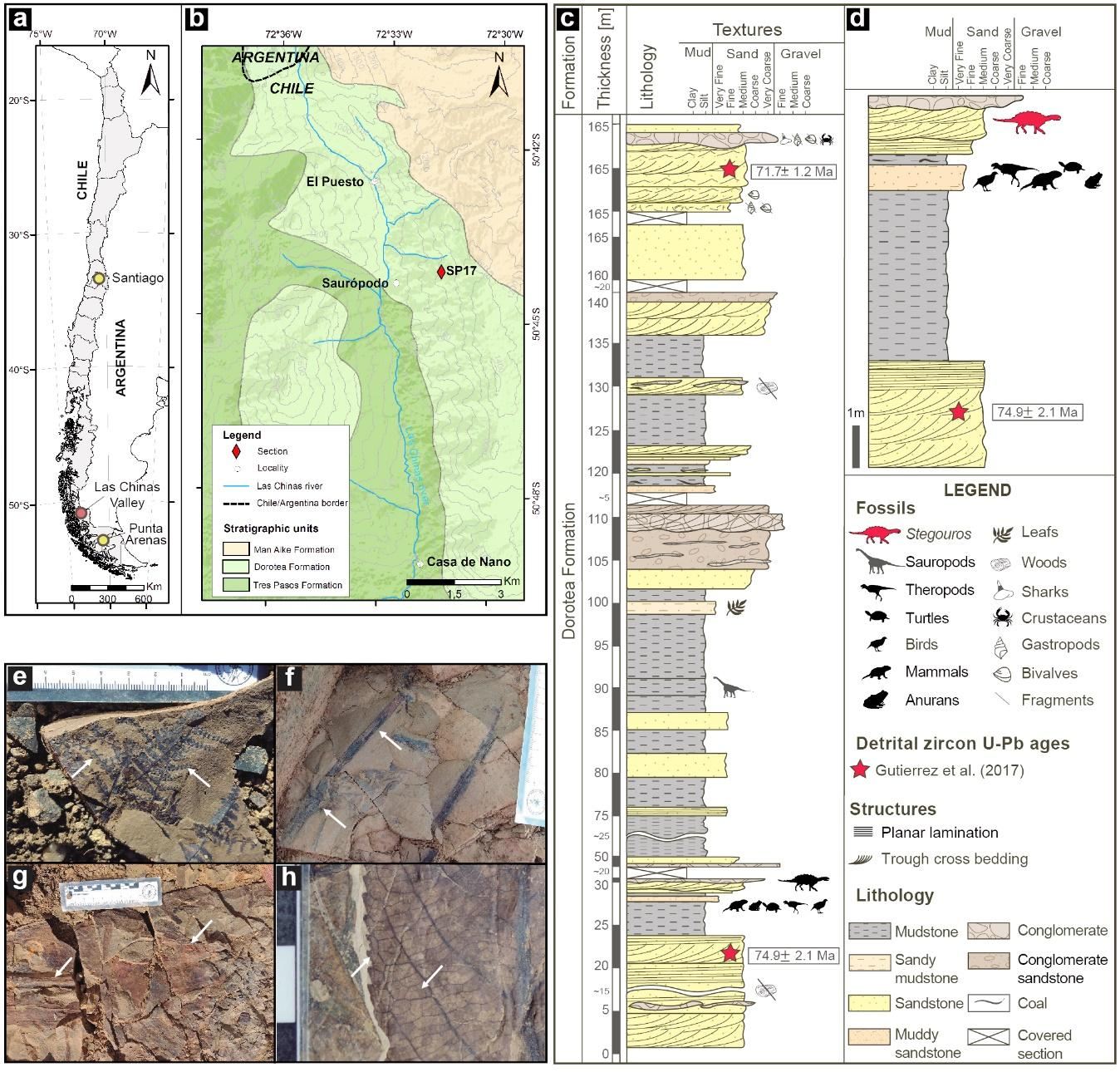
- Type: Geological formation
- Underlies: Man Aike Formation
- Overlies: Tres Pasos Formation
- Thickness: 100–350 m (330–1,150 ft)

Lithology
- Primary: Sandstone, claystone
- Other: Conglomerate

Location
- Coordinates: 50.7°S 72.5°W
- Approximate paleocoordinates: 52.9°S 60.5°W
- Region: Magallanes Region
- Country: Chile
- Extent: Río de Las Chinas Valley, Magallanes Basin

Type section
- Named for: Sierra Dorotea
- Named by: Katz
- Year defined: 1963
- Dorotea Formation (Chile)

The Dorotea Formation is a geological formation in the Río de Las Chinas Valley of the Magallanes Basin in Patagonian Chile whose strata date back to the Campanian to Maastrichtian of the Late Cretaceous.

== Description ==
The Dorotea Formation was first described by Katz in 1963. The formation comprises sandstones with frequent conglomerate lenses, concretionary levels and claystones. The Dorotea Formation includes calcareous sandstones with abundant marine invertebrate and fragmentary vertebrate fossils. Hervé et al. (2004) obtained a maximum radiometric age of 67.4 ± 1.5 Ma from detrital zircons contained in sandstones of the Dorotea Formation. Near the top of the formation is an iridium anomaly, correlated with the Cretaceous–Paleogene boundary; this is the southernmost K–Pg boundary site known from South America.

The mudstones and sandstones of the formation were deposited in a fluvial environment. The formation conformably overlies the Tres Pasos Formation and is unconformably overlain by the Lutetian to Bartonian Man Aike Formation. The thickness of the formation ranges from 100 metres (330 ft) in the Sierra Baguales in the north to 350 metres (1,150 ft) in the eponymous Sierra Dorotea in the south.

== Fossil content ==
The following fossils were reported from the formation:

=== Amphibians ===
Amphibians of Dorotea Formation
Taxa	Species	Material	Notes	Images
Anura	Indeterminate		A frog	

=== Reptiles ===
Reptiles of Dorotea Formation
Taxa	Species	Locality	Material	Notes	Images
Aristonectinae	Indeterminate				
Aristonectes	A. sp.				
Yaminuechelys	cf. Yaminuechelys sp.				
Panchelidae	Indeterminate	Saurópodo sector (Section SP-17).	Distal fragment of right humerus and distal end of right femur.		
Elasmosauridae	Indeterminate				

=== Dinosaurs ===
==== Ornithischians ====
Ornithischians of Dorotea Formation
Taxa	Species	Locality	Material	Notes	Images
Gonkoken	G. nanoi	Loma Koken	Several incomplete specimens belonging to individuals of different ages	A hadrosauroid	
Ornithischia	Indeterminate				
Stegouros	S. elengassen		CPAP-3165 (holotype), a holotype consists of a relatively complete skeleton with a skull and lower jaws.	A parankylosaur	

==== Saurischians ====
Saurischians of Dorotea Formation
Taxa	Species	Material	Notes	Images
Enantiornithes	Indeterminate			
Megaraptoridae	Indeterminate			
Ornithurae	Indeterminate			
Sauropoda	Indeterminate			
Unenlagiinae	Indeterminate			
Theropoda	Indeterminate			

=== Mammals ===
Mammals of Dorotea Formation
Taxa	Species	Locality	Material	Notes	Images
Magallanodon	M. baikashkenke	Mammal quarry from the Río de Las Chinas valley	A first lower left molariform	A gondwanathere	
Orretherium	O. tzen	Mammal quarry from the Río de Las Chinas valley	A fragmented lower jaw.	A mesungulatid mammal	
Mammalia	Indeterminate				
Yeutherium	Y. pressor	'Black Bone' Locality	A left maxilla fragment with M1, roots of M2 and mesial roots of M3.	A subantarctic reigitheriidae mammal	

=== Fish ===
Fish of Dorotea Formation
Taxa	Species	Material	Notes	Images
Ischyrhiza	I. chilensis			
Carcharias	C. sp.			
Serratolamna	Indeterminate			

=== Invertebrates ===
Invertebrates of Dorotea Formation
Taxa	Species	Locality	Material	Notes	Images
Dorotheus	Dorotheus guidensis				
Pterotrigonia	P. cazadoriana				
Gunnarites	G. sp.				
Pachydiscus	P. aff. gollevilensis				

== See also ==
- List of dinosaur-bearing rock formations
- Quiriquina Formation
- Chorrillo Formation
- Allen Formation, Campanian to Maastrichtian fossiliferous formation of the Neuquén Basin
- Angostura Colorada Formation, Campanian to Maastrichtian fossiliferous formation of the North Patagonian Massif
- La Colonia Formation, Campanian to Maastrichtian formation of the Cañadón Asfalto Basin
- Colorado Formation, Campanian to Maastrichtian fossiliferous formation of the Colorado Basin
- Lago Colhué Huapí Formation, Campanian to Maastrichtian fossiliferous formation of the Golfo San Jorge Basin
- López de Bertodano Formation
- Snow Hill Island Formation
- Sobral Formation
