= Cronopio dentiacutus =

Cronopio dentiacutus Temporal range: Albian, ~111–106 Ma
- Skull diagram. Scale bar = 5 mm

Scientific classification
- Kingdom: Animalia
- Phylum: Chordata
- Class: Mammalia
- Clade: Cladotheria
- Clade: †Meridiolestida
- Genus: †Cronopio; Rougier et al. 2011
- Species: †C. dentiacutus

Binomial name
- †Cronopio dentiacutus Rougier et al. 2011

Extinct genus of dryolestoid mammals

Cronopio is an extinct genus of small insectivorous mammal known from the Early Cretaceous (Albian) of the Río Negro region in Argentina. The genus contains a single species, Cronopio dentiacutus. It belongs to the Meridiolestida, an extinct group of mammals widespread in South America during the Late Cretaceous, which are more closely related to modern marsupials and placental mammals than to monotremes.

== Description ==
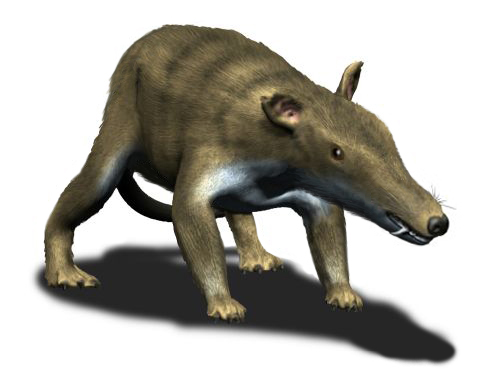
Life restoration

Cronopio is known from the holotype MPCA PV 454, a partial skull around 27 millimetres (1.1 in) long which is missing the skull roof, basicranium and squamosals and from the referred specimens MPCA PV 450, a partial left lower jaw with damaged teeth and MPCA PV 453, an incomplete skull with a relatively complete right lower jaw missing some teeth. All specimens were collected in La Buitrera locality, from the Candeleros Formation of the Neuquén Group. Originally suggested to be the Cenomanian age of the Late Cretaceous, the maximum depositional age of both the Candeleros Formation and the overlying Huincul Formation is re-dated to the early Albian by Maniel et al. (2026), approximately 111.4 ± 1.1 Ma and 106.2 ± 1.0 Ma respectively.

Paleontologist Guillermo Rougier commented on the creature's "superficial" resemblance to the fictional character Scrat in the Ice Age franchise created by Chris Wedge, saying "it just goes to show how diverse ancient mammals are, that we can just imagine some bizarre critter and later find something just like it."

== Etymology ==
Cronopio was first named by Guillermo W. Rougier, Sebastián Apesteguía and Leandro C. Gaetano in 2011 and the type species is C. dentiacutus. The generic name is named after the fictional characters appearing in the work of Argentinian writer Julio Cortázar. The specific name is derived from Latin, meaning "sharp-toothed".

== Phylogeny ==
Cladogram following the analysis of Rougier, Wible, Beck and Apesteguía (2012):

- Meridiolestida
  - - Leonardus
    - - Cronopio
      - Necrolestes
  - Mesungulatoidea
    - Reigitherium
    - - Peligrotherium
      - - Mesungulatum
        - Coloniatherium
