= Austrotriconodon =

Austrotriconodon Temporal range: Campanian-Maastrichtian ~79–66 Ma

Scientific classification
- Domain: Eukaryota
- Kingdom: Animalia
- Phylum: Chordata
- Class: Mammalia
- Clade: Cladotheria
- Clade: †Meridiolestida
- Family: †Austrotriconodontidae; Bonaparte, 1992
- Genus: †Austrotriconodon; Bonaparte, 1986

Type species
- Austrotriconodon mckennai Bonaparte, 1986

Extinct genus of mammals

Austrotriconodon is a mammal genus from the Campanian and Maastrichtian of South America. It currently contains only the type species, A. mckennai. Originally assumed to be a eutriconodont, more recent studies have recovered it as a meridiolestidan dryolestoid.

== Description ==
Austrotriconodon is known only from its teeth. Their similarity to the triconodont teeth of mammals such as eutriconodonts has caused taxonomic confusion and referral of this taxon to eutriconodonta; however, discovery of similar teeth in animals such as Cronopio has led to its reinterpretation as a meridolestidan.

== Discovery and species ==
Austrotriconodon fossils were found in the Argentinean Los Alamitos Formation, dating to the Campanian or Maastrichtian age. The only known fossils are two lower premolariform teeth.

The holotype of A. mckennai was later referred to by Bonaparte as "A. ferox" in the caption to an image figuring it. This name has been ignored by later researchers and is considered an objective synonym of A. mckennai.

A second species, A. sepulvedai, was named by Bonaparte in 1992. However, a 2013 reinterpretation placed this taxon within Mesungulatidae, separate from A. mckennai, and considered the name "Austrotriconodon" sepulvadai an invalid combination. The authors suggested possible synonymy with Mesungulatum houssayi but neither synonymised the two nor named a new genus.
