= Gabriela Suppicich =

Argentine politician

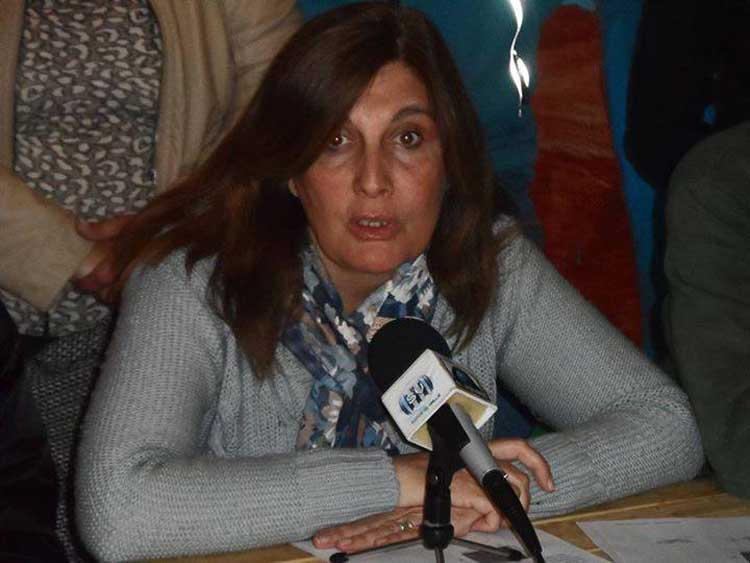

Gabriela Suppicich is an activist in the Workers' Party (Argentina).

She is a provincial deputy in Neuquén Province in Argentina.

She was elected as a candidate of the Workers' Left Front, she holds the post in rotation, and took over from Angelica Lagunas in December 2014.

She has previously worked as a social worker, and a lecturer at the National University of Comahue.
