= Carlos Ameghino Provincial Museum =

Museum in Río Negro Province, Argentina

Coordinates: 38.9187°S 67.9954°W

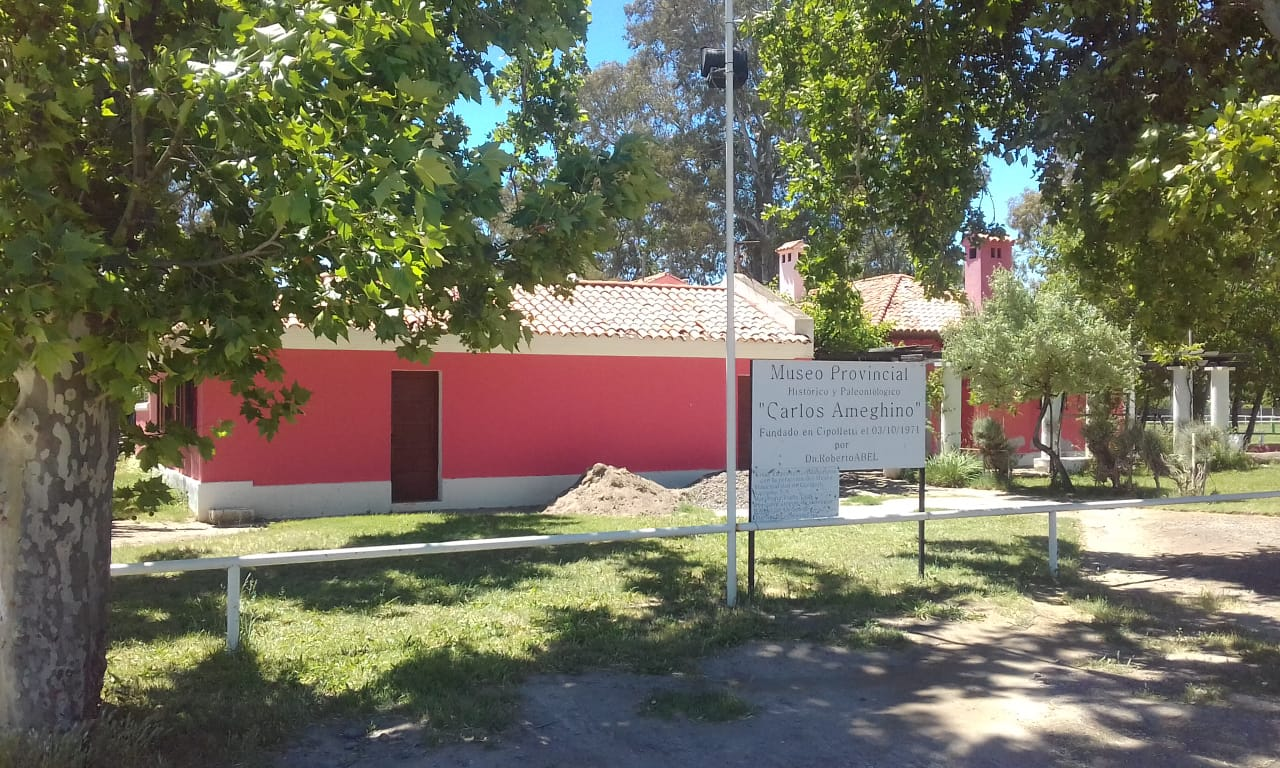
- Carlos Ameghino Museum.
- Established: October 1971
- Location: Cipolletti, Río Negro Province, Argentina
- Type: Science museum Local Museum
- Collections: Paleontology, Fauna, Local History
- Founder: Roberto Abel
- Website: Facebook

The Carlos Ameghino Provincial Museum is a natural science museum founded by Professor Roberto Abel in 1971. It is located in Cipolletti city, Río Negro Province, Argentina. It is named after the renowned naturalist and explorer Carlos Ameghino. It is currently located in the "Pichi Ruca" house which belonged to General Manuel Fernàndez Oro and is located within the land of the "La Esmeralda" estate.

The Museum is placed in Belgrano 2150, Cipolletti (8324), Río Negro Province, Argentine Republic.

== History ==
In the beginning, it was located at the Peuser Manor, located in the Los Tordos neighbourhood in the city of Cipolletti. It currently belongs to the School of Humanities of the National University of Comahue. In 1987 the museum was moved to the "Pichi Ruca" house, which was a part of the "La Esmeralda" estate. The manor belonged to General Manuel Fernández Oro, the city's founder, and his wife, Lucinda González Larrosa. The Senate of Argentina declared the Museum a place of social, cultural and educational interest in 2015, as a recognition of its institutional work. The proposal was submitted by national senator Magdalena Odarda and passed on 25 November of that year.

== Collections ==
The museum hosts collections of recent and fossil species, minerals, as well as objects related to the early history of Cipolletti. Remains of recent species include birds, reptiles and mammals. Fossil remains include mesozoic tetrapods, such as the original skull of Abelisaurus comahuensis, a meat-eating dinosaur that lived in Patagonia during the Cretaceous. Remains of other taxa of theropods are exhibited, including Buitreraptor gonzalezorum, Alnashetri cerropoliciensis, Bonapartenykus ultimus and Quilmesaurus curriei, as well as ornithopods such as Willinakaqe salitralensis. Also, there are fossil remains of snakes (Najash rionegrina), a sphenodontian (Priosphenodon avelasi), and a mammal (Cronopio dentiacutus).

Besides, it has got a collection of archaeological pieces from the site of the Higher Valley of the Negro River. This collection consists of lithic material (mortars, pestles, grinders, bolas, arrow heads, knives, racloirs, et cetera) and numerous pieces of pottery.

== Laboratory of palaeo-histological cuts ==
The Carlos Ameghino Museum includes a laboratory for cutting thin slices of contemporary and fossil bones for histological studies. It was set up in 2017, and currently is the only laboratory specifically aimed at treating fossilised bones for research purposes in the Comahue region.
