= Coloniatherium =

Coloniatherium Temporal range: Maastrichtian ~70–66 Ma

Scientific classification
- Kingdom: Animalia
- Phylum: Chordata
- Class: Mammalia
- Clade: †Meridiolestida
- Family: †Mesungulatidae
- Genus: †Coloniatherium; Rougier et al., 2009
- Species: †C. cilinskii

Binomial name
- †Coloniatherium cilinskii Rougier et al., 2009

Extinct family of mammals

Coloniatherium is a meridiolestid mammal from the Late Cretaceous of Argentina. The single species, Coloniatherium cilinskii, was a large member of the family Mesungulatidae.

== Taxonomy ==
Coloniatherium was named in 2009 by Guillermo Rougier and colleagues and assigned to the family Mesungulatidae within the Dryolestoidea. Dryolestoidea is an extinct mammalian group that occurred in North America, Eurasia, and Africa during the Jurassic and Early Cretaceous, but survived in South America during the Late Cretaceous and into the Paleocene. The generic name, Coloniatherium, combines the name of the La Colonia Formation, the stratigraphical unit where fossils of the animal were found, and its namesake the Sierra de La Colonia with the Greek therion "beast". The specific name, cilinskii, honors Juan Cilinski, a local rancher who helped with the fieldwork that led to the discovery of Coloniatherium.

== Description ==
Coloniatherium is known from a few jaw fragments, a number of isolated teeth, and some petrosals (ear bones). It was a large mesungulatid. The animal had an unknown number of incisors (probably two or three in the lower jaw), one canine, three premolars, and three molars per jaw quadrant. It is larger than Mesungulatum, has broader molars, and the back molars are more reduced; the two also differ in numerous details of tooth morphology. The first molar has three roots, a trait shared only with Leonardus from the approximately contemporaneous Los Alamitos Formation of Argentina among dryolestoids.

The petrosal of Coloniatherium appears to be similar in terms of phylogenetic position to Vincelestes, an Early Cretaceous Argentinean mammal, but also share some apparently derived traits with therians (i.e., marsupials, placentals, and relatives). Based on comparisons with Vincelestes, the length of the skull of Coloniatherium would be estimated to be 87.5 mm (3.4 in); comparisons with therians suggest a larger skull length, but the former estimate is more in line with the size of the jaws. It is estimated to weigh ~3.69 kg.

== Range and ecology ==
Fossils of Coloniatherium come from the La Colonia Formation, which outcrops in north-central Chubut Province. The mammalian fossils come from the Mirasol Chico valley. The formation includes fluvial (river), deep-sea, and near-shore deposits, and the mammalian fauna probably comes from an estuary, tidal flat, or coastal plain. La Colonia Formation also contains dryolestoids, such as Coloniatherium and Reigitherium, as well as the enigmatic possible multituberculates Argentodites and Ferugliotherium. Coloniatherium is the largest and most abundant mammal found in the formation.

Mesungulatids, including Coloniatherium, are a highly derived group of mammals, possibly specialized for an omnivorous to herbivorous diet, Coloniatherium cilinskii's large population density possibly indicating the latter as it is among the most common vertebrates in its faunal assemblage. They are among the most distinctive products of the unique Mesozoic radiation of South American mammals.
