= Silvia Blumenfeld =

Argentine mycologist

Silvia N. Blumenfeld (Hebrew: סילביה בלומנפלד) is an expert on mycology. From 1986 to 2004, she was a Professor of Mycology and Biotechnology of Filamentous Fungi at the National University of Comahue, in Río Negro, Argentina. She emigrated to Israel in 2002, where she became the curator of the Tel Aviv University fungi collection, specializing in medicinal mushrooms. She has over 50 articles, books, and patents to her name, and has received academic honours. In 1995, she was awarded the Argentine National 'José Antonio Balseiro' Prize for her work.

== Career ==
Silvia Blumenfeld is a professor and researcher specializing in mycology, plant pathology and forest pathology. She is an expert in the biotechnology of mushrooms, wood rotting fungi, and culture collections of mushrooms. She has managed projects in genetic selection and strain improvement of edible and medicinal mushrooms. Blumenfeld has worked 20 years in the formulation of mushroom inoculants and industrial production of mushroom inoculants and mushroom biotechnology.

- Professor of Phytopathology, Universidad Nacional del Comahue, Faculty of Agronomy, Cinco Saltos, Rio Negro, Argentina, 1986–2004.
- Professor of Biotechnology of filamentous mushrooms, the master's degree course in Chemical Sciences of the Universidad Nacional del Comahue, 1995–2004.
- Member of the "Carrera del Investigador Cientifico y Tecnologico" of the National Research Council of Argentina (CONICET), 1985–2002.
- Worked as a researcher in the Hagolan Research Institute in 2003.
- Worked at Tel Aviv University as the curator of the fungal culture collection, 2006–2010.
- She has been invited to teach at many Universities and Institutes in Canada, Spain, France, the USA, Mexico, Venezuela, Cuba, Brazil and Uruguay.
- In 2010 she established Mycolo, a company specializing in medicinal mushrooms cultivation and processing them into medicinal mushroom extracts.

== Academic degrees and honours ==
- Facultad de Ciencias Exactas y Naturales, University of Buenos Aires.
- Degree: Licentiate in Biological Sciences.
- Post Graduate Degree: Dr. in Biological Sciences.
- Professor of Plant Pathology and Biotechnology of Mushrooms

1995 – Argentine National 'José Antonio Balseiro' Prize, as Director of Group of work for the results of technological transfer and extension work with the productive sector in the field of edible mushrooms, granted by the Ministry of Education and the Forum of the Science and Technology. It was awarded on April 26 by the President of Argentina, Dr. Carlos Menem, in the White Room of Government's House.

- Member of the Sociedad Argentina de Botánica, since 1977.
- Member of the Mycological Society of America, 1985–1995.
- Member of the Canadian Phytopathological Society, 1987–1995.
- Member of the Asociacion Argentina of Micología, since 1987.
- Member of the Sociedad Chilena de Fitopatología, since 1991.
- Member of the Asociacion Latinoamericana de Micología, since 1994.
- Member of the Asociacion Micológica Carlos Spegazzini, since 1994.
- Beer Sheva, Israel, August 2008

== Publications ==
=== Articles ===
BLUMENFELD, S.N. & J.E. WRIGHT, 1984. "Two new pileate species of Junghuhnia (Polyporaceae)." Mycotaxon 19 (1): 471–478.

WRIGHT, J.E. & S.N. BLUMENFELD, 1984. "New South American species Phellinus (Hymenochaetaceae)." Mycotaxon 21(4):423–425.

BLUMENFELD, S.N., 1984. "Studies on the degradation of pine wood blocks by Aphyllophorales." Material und Organismen 19 (4): 253 - 262.

BLUMENFELD, S.N., 1986. "Estudio ecologico de los Basidiomycetes xilofilos en plantaciones de Pinus elliottii y Pinus taeda de Argentina." Bol. Soc. Arg. Bot. 24 (3-4): 261-281.

BLUMENFELD, S.N., 1986. "Los hongos lignívoros de la región patagónica: estado actual de su conocimiento." Actas I Jornadas Forestales Patagónicas: 238–244. Siringa (Ed.), Neuquén.

BLUMENFELD, S.N., 1986. "Interacciones en cultivo entre Naematoloma fasciculare (Huds. Fr.) Karst. (Agaricales, Strophariaceae) y varias especies de hongos xilófilos." Physis (Buenos Aires), C,44 (107): 97–102.

BLUMENFELD, S.N. & B.C. DOBRA, 1986. "Athelia epiphylla Pers. (Aphyllophorales, Corticiaceae), agente causal del ojo de pescado en peras." Actas VI Jornadas Fitosanitarias Argentinas, Fitopatología: 335–343.

BLUMENFELD, S.N., L.A. GALLO & H.A. MATTES, 1988. "Selección de clones de Alamo resistantes a la degradación fúngica." Actas V Jornadas Forestales Argentinas :532–543.

BLUMENFELD, S.N., 1992. "Macromycetes (Aphyllophorales) asociados a los álamos. Estudio ecológico para el Alto Valle de Río Negro y Neuquén." Bol. Soc. Arg. Bot. 28 (1-2):101–110.

WRIGHT, J.E., J.R. DESCHAMPS & S.N. BLUMENFELD, 1993. "Basidiomycetes xilófilos de la región mesopotámica. IV. Especies poroides de la familia Hymenochaetaceae Donk." Rev. Invest. Agrop. INTA, XXII (2): 132–167.

BLUMENFELD, S.N., H.A. MATTES & P. BUCKI, 1993. "Fusarium lateritium Nees, agente causal de una cancrosis en Alamos del Valle Medio del Río Negro." Actas VI Jornadas Fitosanitarias Argentinas:115–122.

BLUMENFELD, S.N., 1993. "Resistance of poplar clones to xylophagous fungi." Material und Organismen: 28 (4): 262–269.

BLUMENFELD, S.N. &H. RUBI. 1994 "Cultivo de hongos comestibles sobre residuos de maderas." Bol. Soc. Arg. Bot. 30 (2): 23–34

BLUMENFELD, S.N. & C.L. COSCARON. 1995. "Hongos lignívoros en bosques de lenga [Nothofagus pumilio (Poep. et Endl.) Krasser] de la provincial de Neuquén, Argentina." Bosque (Chile) 16 (2): 84–96

BLUMENFELD, S.N. & J.A. SAIZ DE OMEÑACA. 1996. "Micorrización de plántulas de pino carrasco (Pinus halepensis) obtenidos por propagación vegetativa. Investigación Agraria." Recursos forestales 5 (2): 181–195.

BLUMENFELD, S.N., 1996. "Cultivo de Lentinus edodes Berk, sobre aserrín de álamo suplementado." Bol. Soc. Arg. Bot. 32 (1): 55–61.

Blumenfeld, S.N., 1997. "Cepario LIHLCOM de la Universidad Nacional del Comahue." En:CABBIO (Eds.), Catálogo Nacional de Cepas de Microorganismos, PROIMI - FCEN - UBA, Tucumán, p. 92–96

BLUMENFELD, S.N., 1998. "El proyecto RESANFOR-NEUQUÉN, evaluación de danos producidos por las enfermedades de origen fúngico." Actas del Primer Simposio Argentinocanadiense y Primer Congreso Argentino de Protección Forestal (PROFOR): 1–10.

BLUMENFELD, S.N. & H. RUBI, 1998. "Micorrizas comestibles en plantaciones de coníferas de Río Negro y Neuquén." Actas del Primer Simposio Argentino-canadiense y Primer Congreso de Protección Forestal (PROFOR): 51–59.

BLUMENFELD, S.N., 1998. "Argentine patent on new method of mushroom cultivation on wood wastes." Patente de invención No. 251.648 del Instituto Nacional de la Propiedad Industrial, INPI, Buenos Aires, Argentina.

BLUMENFELD, S.N., & H. RUBI, 2000. "Estudio comparativo de cepas americanas y europeas de hongos comestibles." Rev. Ibero-Americana de Micología 17 :129–136.

BLUMENFELD, S.N. & H. RUBI, 2001. "Cultivo de Pleurotus spp. sobre residuos lignocelulosicos." Rev. Ibero-Americana de Micología 18:92–98.

BLUMENFELD, S.N., 2001. "Crecimiento y productividad de cuatro cepas de Pleurotus ostreatus (Fr.) Kumm. sobre differentes sustratos." Rev. Bosque (Chile) 22(2): 135–141.

ROMERO, A. & BLUMENFELD, S.N., 2001. "Tuber rufus Pico, first citation for Argentina." The Mycologist: 15(4):173–175.

FLOCCARI, M., LEVIS, S., SFREDDO, E., MARTOS, G., LUCERO, N., LEARDINI, N., CABRAL, D. & S. BLUMENFELD. 2004. "Creation of a Culture Collection Federation for Latin America and the Caribbean." WFCC Newsletter 38:45.

Blumenfeld, S.N., Tzahavi, T. & Reuveni, M., 2007. "Fungi associated with esca wood decay of grapevines in Israel." Proceedings of II International Congress of Food Science and Technology, Cordoba, Argentina : 315–327.

Blumenfeld, S.N., 2007. "Toxic mushrooms in Israel." Proceedings of II International Congress of Food Science and Technology, Cordoba, Argentina : 328–339.

Blumenfeld, S.N., Tzahavi, T. & Reuveni, M., 2008. "Cultural studies on Fomitiporia punctata, associated with esca wood decay of grapevines in Israel." Mycological Res. (in press).

Publications of books or chapters of books

Blumenfeld, S.N., 1991. Producción de hongos comestibles. Cuaderno de Investigación No. 1. Facultad de Agronomía, Universidad Nacional del Comahue, 24 pp.

Blumenfeld, S.N., 1992. Curso de capacitación en el cultivo de hongos comestibles. Facultad de Cs. Agrarias, Universidad Nacional del Comahue, FORAT Impresos, Cinco Saltos, 80 pp., (ISBN 950 - 43 - 5107 - 7).

Deschamps, J., J. Wright, S. Blumenfeld, D. Cozzo, H. Lauria, H. Peredo and J. Vizcarra Sanchez, 1997. Patología Forestal del cono sur de América (Forest pathology of the South Cone of America), vol. I, Mycorrhizae. Orientación Gráfica Editora, Bs. As., 237 p.,(ISBN 987 - 99791 - 3-3)

Blumenfeld, S.N., 1998. Cultivo de hongos comestibles sobre residuos agroindustriales. Imprenta Islas Malvinas, Facultad de Cs. Agrarias, Universidad Nacional del Comahue Neuquén, 112 pp.

Blumenfeld, S.N., 2002. Cultivo de hongos comestibles sobre residuos agroindustriales (2ª ed.). Imprenta Islas Malvinas, Facultad de Cs. Agrarias, Universidad Nacional del Comahue Neuquén, 122 pp.

Deschamps, J., J. Wright, S. Blumenfeld, D. Cozzo, H. Lauria, H. Peredo and J. Vizcarra Sanchez, 2007. Patología Forestal del cono sur de América (Forest pathology of the South Cone of America), vol. II, Forest Pathology of Poplars. Orientación Gráfica Editora, Bs. As., 322 p.,( ISBN 978-987-99791-3-6 volume 1)

Blumenfeld, S.N., 2008. Growing edible and medicinal wood-rotting fungi. Digital Printer, Beer Sheva, Israel, 215p.

=== Attendance at Congresses and Symposia ===
1983 - XIX Jornadas Argentinas de Botánica, Santa Fe.

Blumenfeld, S.N. "Xylophylous Basidiomycetes in implanted Woods of Pinus taeda and Pinus elliottii", p. 10.

Blumenfeld, S.N. "Contribution to the study of the fungal Argentinean flora: species growing on Pinus elliottii and Pinus taeda", p. 11

1986 - VI Jornadas Fitosanitarias Argentinas, Neuquén. Blumenfeld, S.N. & A. Dobra. "Athelia epiphylla Pers.(Aphyllophorales, Corticiaceae), ethiological agent of 'fish eye rot' on pears", p. 335

1987 - First Symposium on Nothofagus, Villa La Angostura, Neuquén. Blumenfeld, S.N. "Dynamics of fungal degradation on 'lenga' woods", p. 2

1987 - First Joint Meeting of the Mycological Society of America and the Canadian Phytopathological Society, Ottawa, Canada.

Blumenfeld, S.N. "Basidiomycetes that decay Nothofagus pumilio forests: dynamics of fungal degradation of wood", p. 111

1991 - XII International Plant Protection Congress, Rio de Janeiro, Brazil. Blumenfeld, S.N. & P. Bucki. "Poplar diseases in southern Argentina".

1991 - II Latin American Symposium on genetic resources of horticultural species. XVI Argentinean Congress of Horticulture, Mar del Plata, Argentina Blumenfeld, S.N. & G. E. Rodriguez. "Production of edible mushrooms on agroindustrial wastes", p. 40

1991 - XXIII Argentinean Botanical Congress, San Carlos de Bariloche, Argentina. Blumenfeld, S.N. "Growth and productivity of four strains of Pleurotus ostreatus on different composts", p. 46

Bucki, P., M.B. Antola & S.N. Blumenfeld. Micropropagation of poplar clones, p. 170. Blumenfeld, S.N. & A. Bartusch. "Computer science applied to the investigation in forest pathology", p. 290

1991 - II National Congress of Phytopathology, Valdivia, Chile. Blumenfeld, S.N. & P. Bucki. "Selection of resistant poplars to fungal pathogens", p. 10 Blumenfeld, S. N. & H. Rubi. "Bioconversion of agroindustrial wastes by wood-degrading mushrooms", p. 11

Antola, M.B., Bucki, P. & S.N. Blumenfeld. "Micropropagation of resistant poplars to fungal pathogens: preliminary studies", p. 12

1992 - ETNOBOTANICA 92, Cordoba, Spain. Blumenfeld, S.N. & H. Rubi. "A comparative study of the productivity of European and American strains of edible mushrooms", p. 299

1992 - XXV Congreso Brasileiro de Fitopatologia, Gramado, Brazil. Bucki, P., M.B.Antola & S.N. Blumenfeld. "Micropropagation of resistant forest trees to fungal diseases". Fitopatol. Bras. 17 (2): 158.

Blumenfeld, S.N. "The phytopathological frequent problems in the cultivation of edible mushrooms on agroindustrial wastes". Fitopatol. Bras. 17 (2): 171.

1993 - 6th International Congress of Plant Pathology, Montreal, Canada. Blumenfeld, S.N. "Studies of Araucaria declines in the Caviahue Park, Argentina", p. 98. 1993 - VI Argentinean Congress of Mycology . Buenos Aires. Rubi, H. & S.N. Blumenfeld. "Substrate formulation for the cultivation of edible mushrooms", p. 1135.

1994 - 5th International Congress of Mycology. Vancouver, Canada Blumenfeld, S.N. & H. Rubí. "Bioconversion of wood wastes by white rot edible fungi".

1994 - Latin American Congress of Botany. Mar del Plata. Blumenfeld, S.N., M.B. Antola and H. Rubí. "Influences of the method of spawn production in the cultivation of edible mushrooms".

1994 - Workshop on contributions of the Phytopathology to the Argentinean agricultural production. Buenos Aires. Blumenfeld, S.N. "Pathology of the cultivation of edible mushrooms".

1995 - IV Patagonical Forest Meeting. San Martin de los Andes, Neuquen. Blumenfeld, S.N. & L. Pozo. "The RESANFOR - NEUQUEN Project:: forest diseases survey".

1996 - VIII Latin American Congress. VI National Congress of Horticulture, Montevideo, Uruguay. Blumenfeld, S.N. & H. Rubi. "The LIHLCOM project: a system of technological transfer of the production of edible mushrooms in the Republica Argentina", p. 174.

1998 - First Canadian Argentinean Symposium and First Argentinean Congress of Forest Protection, Buenos Aires, 13 at April 15.

Blumenfeld, S.N. "Sustainable use of the forest edible mushrooms", p. 32

Blumenfeld, S.N. "The RESANFOR-NEUQUEN project, evaluation of the damage for diseases", p. 47.

Blumenfeld, S.N. & H. Rubi. "The edible mycorrhizae in pine plantations: their role as biological control agents", p. 53

Blumenfeld, S.N., H. Rubi & C. Coscaron Arias. "The LIHLCOM project: a system of technological transfer for the production of edible mushrooms", p. 33.

1998 - International Congress of Plant Protection, Edinburgh, U.K. Blumenfeld, S.N. Ecology of diseases in forest nurseries in Neuquen, Argentina

1999 - III Latinamerican Mycological Congress. Caracas, Venezuela. Blumenfeld, S.N., A. Romero & N. Barnes. "First citation of Tuber magnatum Pico for Argentina", p. 124

2000. I Latinamerican Symposium on mushroom production, Xalapa, Veracruz, Mexico. Blumenfeld, S.N. y C. L. Coscaron Arias. "Germplasm collections and genetic resources on edible mushrooms", p. 17

2000 - 15th International Congress on the Science and Cultivation of Edible Mushrooms. Maastricht, Netherlands.

Blumenfeld, S.N. & H. Rubi. "Technological optimization for edible wood- rotting fungi production", p. 943.

=== Symposia lectures ===
1991 - XXIII Argentinean Botanical Congress, San Carlos of Bariloche. Session on Computer Sciences applied to the botanical research.

1993. IVI Argentinean Congress of Mycology. Blumenfeld, S.N. Biodeterioration of wood for industrial use, Symposium on materials biodeterioration.

Blumenfeld, S.N. Degradation of lignocellulosic wastes: their application to the substrate formulation for the cultivation of edible mushrooms, Symposium on Physiology of mushrooms: Enzymes

1995 - 61st. Annual Meeting of the Canadian Phytopathological Society, Toronto, Canada. Blumenfeld, S.N., H.E. Giganti & G. Dapoto. Forest Protection at Argentina: the RESANFOR-NEUQUEN project.

1996 - II Latin American Congress of Mycology, Havana, Cuba. Blumenfeld, S.N. & H. Rubi. Cultivation of edible mushrooms on agroindustrial wastes in the Republica Argentina, p. 8.

1997 - Workshop on Sustainable Development, Global Change and Environmental Impact. Organised by the Dept. of Geography of the UNC and the Organising Committee of the PROFOR, First Argentinean-Canadian Symposium of Forest Protection.

Blumenfeld, S.N. sustainable Use of forest by-products: the edible and medicinal mushrooms.

1997 - The Human Dimensions Global of Climate Change and Sustainable Forest Management in the America: An Inter-American Conference. Brasília, Brazil.

Blumenfeld, S.N., Sustainable cropping of edible mycorrhizae at Neuquen, Argentina

1999 - III Latin American Congress of Mycology, Caracas, Venezuela, August 31 on 3 September.

Blumenfeld, S.N. & H. Rubi. "The sustainable cultivation of edible and medicinal mushrooms in Argentina".p. 47

1996 - First Patagonical Meeting of educators in the Chemistry and others Natural Sciences, Neuquen. Blumenfeld, S.N. The medicinal, toxic and hallucinogens mushrooms.

1997. "XIX Provincial Fair of Sciences and Technology". Blumenfeld, S.N. The medicinal, toxic and hallucinogen mushrooms.

1999 - III Latinamerican Congress of Mycology, Caracas, Venezuela. Blumenfeld, S.N. & H. Rubi. "Sustainable production of edible and medicinal mushrooms in Argentina". p. 47

2000 - I Latinamerican Symposium on mushroom production, Xalapa, Veracruz, Mexico. Blumenfeld, S.N. y H. Rubi. "Production of edible mushrooms in Argentina, an alternative to the productive reconversion and economical development", p. 32. As Chairman of Session:

1996 - II Latin American Congress of Mycology, Havana, Cuba. Symposium on cultivation of edible mushrooms in Latin America.

1998 - First Canadian Argentinean Symposium and First Argentinean Congress of Forest Protection, Buenos Aires. Symposium of Forest Mycology and Forest Pathology.

1999 - III Latin American Congress of Mycology, Caracas, Venezuela. Symposium on Technological aspects of the cultivation of edible mushrooms in Latin America.

2004 – XVIII Latin American Congress of Microbiology. Buenos Aires, Argentina. Blumenfeld, S.N.. Strategies for the conservation of endangered culture collections.
