= Yeutherium =

Yeutherium Temporal range: Late Cretaceous, ~72–66 Ma

Scientific classification
- Kingdom: Animalia
- Phylum: Chordata
- Class: Mammalia
- Clade: †Meridiolestida
- Clade: †Mesungulatoidea
- Family: †Reigitheriidae
- Genus: †Yeutherium; Püschel et al., 2025
- Species: †Y. pressor

Binomial name
- †Yeutherium pressor Püschel et al., 2025

Extinct family of mammals

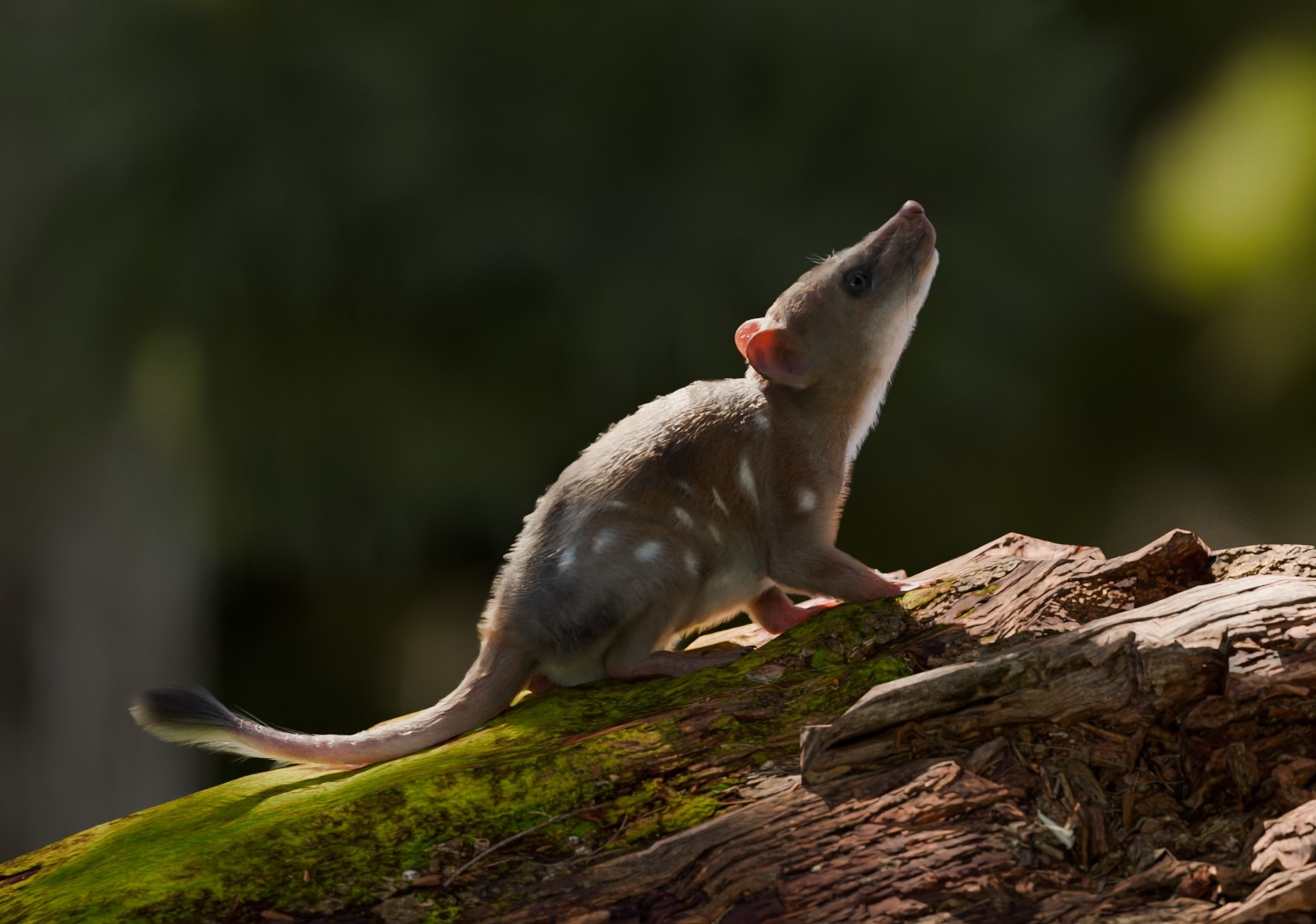
Image of a reconstruction of a Yeutherium pressor as he lived, rendered and created in Blender.

Yeutherium is an extinct genus of mammal from the Reigitheriidae that lived during the Late Cretaceous (Late Campanian-Maastrichtian). Its fossils have been found in the Dorotea Formation in Chile and the type species is Y. pressor.

== Discovery and naming ==
The holotype was discovered in the Dorotea Formation in Chile and it consists of a partial maxilla with an associated molar.

Yeutherium pressor was named and described by Püschel et al. (2025).

== Description ==
Yeutherium was estimated to weigh around 30 ounces (850 g) when fully grown. Its dentition was also specialised towards crushing food.

== Classification ==
Yeutherium was also found to be close to Reigitherium, and it was subsequently placed into Reigitheriidae as only the second genus in the family.
