= Yaminuechelys =

Yaminuechelys Temporal range: Late Santonian-Thanetian (Tiupampan) ~84.9–58.7 Ma

Scientific classification
- Kingdom: Animalia
- Phylum: Chordata
- Class: Reptilia
- Order: Testudines
- Suborder: Pleurodira
- Family: Chelidae
- Subfamily: Hydromedusinae
- Genus: †Yaminuechelys; De la Fuente et al. 2001

Species
- Y. gasperinii De la Fuente et al. 2001; Y. maior Staesche 1929; Y sulcipeculiaris Oriozabala, Sterli & De La Fuente 2020

Extinct genus of turtles

Yaminuechelys is an extinct genus of chelid turtle from Argentina and the Dorotea Formation of Chile. The genus first appeared during the Late Cretaceous and became extinct during the Late Paleocene.

== Species ==
The genus contains the following three species:

- Y. gasperinii De la Fuente et al. 2001 - Late Cretaceous Allen, Anacleto, La Colonia Formations, Argentina
- Y. maior Staesche 1929 - Tiupampan Salamanca and Roca Formations, Argentina
- Y. sulcipeculiaris Oriozabala, Sterli & De La Fuente 2020 - Late Cretaceous La Colonia Formation, Argentina
