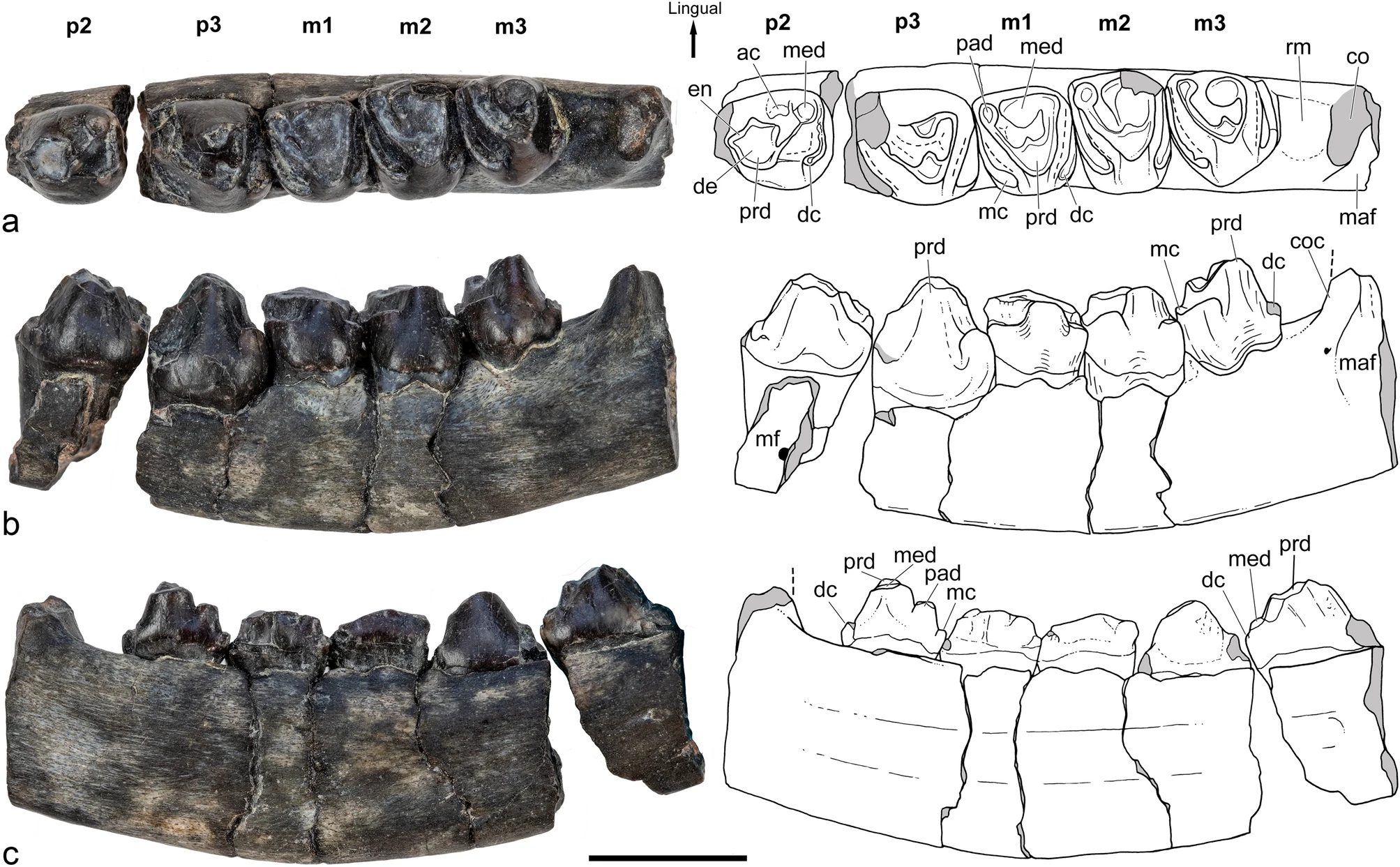
- Lower jaw

Scientific classification
- Kingdom: Animalia
- Phylum: Chordata
- Class: Mammalia
- Clade: †Meridiolestida
- Family: †Mesungulatidae
- Genus: †Orretherium; Martinelli et al., 2021
- Species: †O. tzen

Binomial name
- †Orretherium tzen Martinelli et al., 2021

= Orretherium =

Orretherium Temporal range: Late Cretaceous, Campanian–Maastrichtian

Extinct mammal genus

Orretherium (meaning "Five teeth beast"; in part from the Aonikenk language) is a genus of mesungulatid mammal that lived in South America (Chile) during the Late Cretaceous period in what is now the Dorotea Formation. It is estimated to have weighed ~1.3kg.
