= Trituberculata =

Trituberculata Temporal range: 200–85 Ma Upper Triassic - Upper Cretaceous

Scientific classification
- Kingdom: Animalia
- Phylum: Chordata
- Class: Mammalia
- Subclass: Theria
- Infraclass: †Trituberculata

Orders
- ?Symmetrodonta; Pantotheria; Aegialodontia; Eupantotheria

Extinct infraclass of mammals

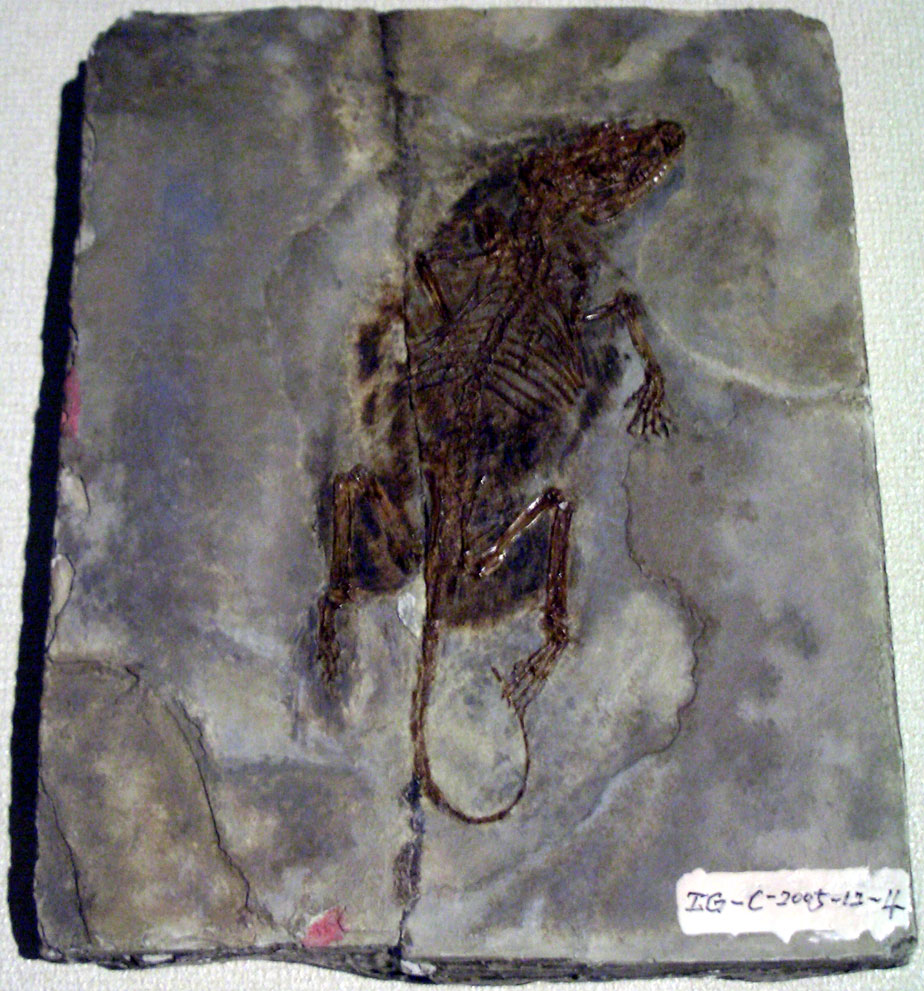
Zhangheotherium quinquecuspidens fossil displayed in Hong Kong Science Museum

Trituberculata is an extinct group of animals existing in the fossil record from about 215 – 85 MYA. It contains the ancestors of Placentalia and Marsupialia; all modern mammals except Monotremata are descended from trituberculates. It is named for the three tubercles (cusps) of the molar teeth (not to be confused with Triconodonta). The clade Trituberculata is not always regarded as a valid one, and it likely does not form a monophyletic group. Instead, some of them may be "true" basal mammals (although not always closest related to each other), while others (such as the symmetrodonts) may fall just outside the therian crown group.

== See also ==
- Eutheria
- Multituberculata
