= School of Languages (National University of Comahue) =

- National University of Comahue
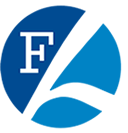
- Type: Public university
- Established: 25 August 1977
- Dean: Mg. Silvina Lizé Rodriguez
- Students: 800
- Location: General Roca, Río Negro, Argentina
- Website: fadelweb.uncoma.edu.ar (in Spanish)

The School of Languages (FADEL) is one of the 17 schools that constitute the National University of Comahue in Argentina. It is located in General Roca, province of Río Negro (Mendoza and Perú). It has 800 students, but with the Department of Foreign Languages for Specific Purposes (DIEPE), located in the city of Neuquén, it provides services to the over 35,000 active students attending its courses in any of the 76 undergraduate and postgraduate programs offered in the different academic units in the provinces of Río Negro and Neuquén.

== History ==
The School of Languages was founded in 1962 by Prof. Haydeé Massoni to commemorate the creation in 1962 of the Higher Institute of Teacher Training, dependent on the Higher Counsel of Education of the Province of Río Negro. The courses of studies offered were Training of Teachers of English, Training of Teachers of French, Pedagogy, Training of Teachers of Spanish and Literature.

In 1972, with the creation of the National University of Comahue, the Higher Institute of Teacher Training became part of the general structure of the National University of Comahue as the School of Teacher Training, dependent on the School of Education Sciences. It was situated in General Roca and it offered two diplomas, namely Training of English Teachers and Training of French Teachers. In 1973, the School of Humanities starts exercising administrative and academic control over the STT. Two years later, the Training of English Teachers is incorporated by the School of Modern Languages and starts depending on the Regional University Centre, located in General Roca. This department lacked legal and academic status because it had been created by an internal regulation of the School of Social Sciences. However, this did not prevent neither the start of lessons nor the beginning of activities of academic research and extension. This led to the creation of the Higher School of Languages on the 25th of August in the year 1977, dependent on the Rector's office.

In May in the year 2010 the Higher School of Languages became the School of Languages (Res. AU 0001/09).

== Undergraduate diplomas ==
=== Sworn Translator of English Training Course ===
One of the undergraduate diplomas awarded at the Department of Languages is the Sworn Translator of English Diploma, Syllabus 499/2001. This diploma is five years long and consists of 35 subjects and two workshops. Any student willing to be awarded this degree must pass all thirty-four subjects and both workshops.

The current syllabus (499/2011) came into full force and effect in 2011. There is no entrance exam to start attending this program. The only requirement is to have been awarded a secondary school diploma.

=== English Teacher Training Course ===
The other undergraduate diploma awarded at the School of Languages is the English Teacher, Syllabus 430/09. This diploma is four years long, and consists of 31 subjects and six workshops. Any student willing to be awarded this degree must pass all thirty-one subjects and six workshops.

The diploma awarded enables graduates to teach English at kindergarten, primary schools and secondary schools, as well as in tertiary schools and universities, both public and private.

== Translation Service ==
The Translation Service is made up of teachers of the Department of Translation, advanced students and alumni of the Sworn Translator of English Training Course. It was created to provide services of interpreting and written translation to all academic units within UNCo, the Rector's office, the Academic Secretary and particular individuals. On the other hand, it offers a means of training for advanced students of the Sworn Translator of English Training Course of the University, and it aims at being a link among graduates, their first steps of their career and the environment. Among the services offered are: written translation of commercial and legal documents; technical, scientific and literary texts; consecutive interpreting; correction of written texts: correcting style and reading, correcting text structure, text rewriting; transcription of oral texts; among others. The Translation Service was created to give translation and interpreting services of teachers, researchers and other members of the university community; giving translation services to companies and public and private organisations within the Comahue region; contributing to the training of advanced students; being a link among graduates and the environment during their first steps in their careers; and creating a database containing the terminological research undertaken during each completed task.

== CELU (Certificate of Spanish: Language and Usage) ==
CELU The School of Languages hosts the exam with international validity CELU (Certificate of Spanish: Language and Usage).

== Research ==
Between 1978 and 1985, the Higher School of Languages (now School of Languages) began its research activities.

The School of Languages, according to the Open Access Act Nº 26,889, has an institutional digital book repository of open access to host the technological and scientific production financed with public funds, which are the result of the research activities undertaken by teachers and researchers of the university. This repository includes institutional production (technical reports, biographical data, et cetera) research projects, and information on the researchers.

=== Centre of Translation Studies (CET) ===
In 2012 the Centre of Translation Studies Bernabé Duggan was created. The translators and the teachers from the Department of Translation of the National University of Comahue submitted a proposal for the creation of a CET and it was approved by the Higher Counsel at an ordinary meeting on June 8, 2012.

The main goal of the CET is to contribute to the strengthening of the institutionalisation of translation studies in Argentina.

== Academic events ==
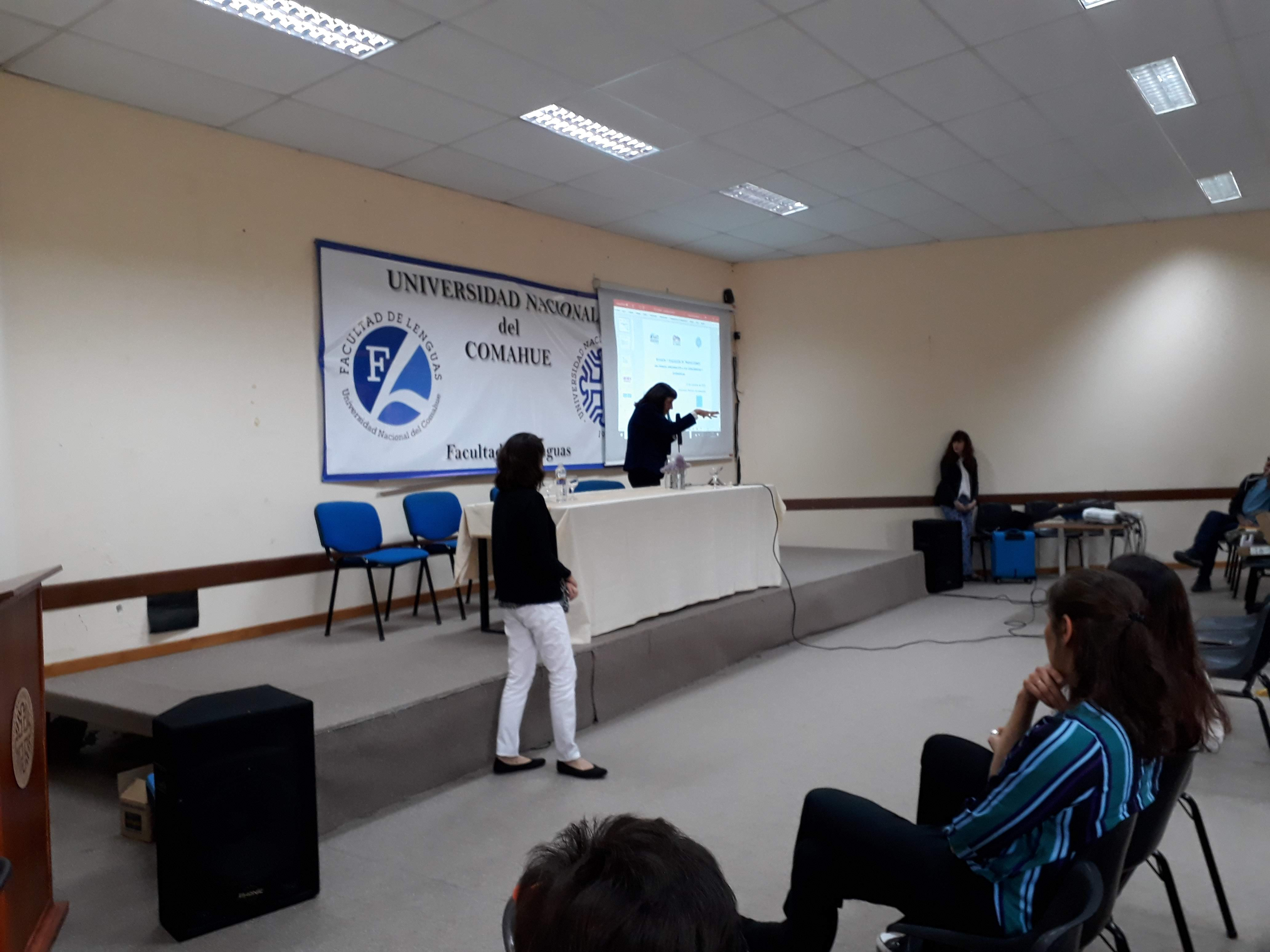
Translation session in 2019

=== National Congress El Conocimiento como Espacio de Encuentro (Knowledge as a Gathering Place) ===
Since 2010 the School of Languages has organised this congress in its General Roca location. To date, five events have been organised.

The goal of this congress is to create a space where professionals and advanced students from the university community from UNCo, from other universities, from primary and from secondary schools can share their experiences.

=== JOIN FadeL ===
Since 2017, advanced students from the undergraduate diplomas of the School of Languages organise and take part in the Jornadas de Jóvenes Investigadores de la Facultad de Lenguas (Sessions of Young Young Researchers of the School of Languages). Their aim is to create a space for exchanging research papers produced during their training. For this reason these events are a first approach to the research work, one of the features of the profile of university graduates.

=== Patagonian Sessions of Formal Linguistics ===
Since 2011, the Master's Degree of the School of Languages coordinates the Patagonian Sessions of Formal Linguistics in General Roca. These are aimed at undergraduate and postgraduate students, as well as researchers.

The latest edition took place in April 2019 and the organising commission was made up of Andrea Bohrn (UBA/UNGS), Gonzalo Espinosa (UNComahue/IPEHCS-CONICET) and María Mare (UNComahue/IPEHCS-CONICET).

=== Translation Sessions of the Comahue ===
Since 2017, the School of Languages of the UNCo hosts the Sessions for Translators. These sessions aimed at translation professionals, students and teachers were created to visibilise the realities of translation within professional and academic circles.

== Publications ==
Journal: Quintú Quimün. Revista de Lingüística

== Libraries ==
- Biblioteca Ernesto Sábato
- Biblioteca Digital de la Facultad de Lenguas
