= Solanutherium =

Solanutherium Temporal range: Mid Campanian-Maastrichtian ~73–66 Ma

Scientific classification
- Kingdom: Animalia
- Phylum: Chordata
- Class: Mammalia
- Clade: †Meridiolestida
- Genus: †Solanutherium
- Species: †S. walshi

Binomial name
- †Solanutherium walshi Connelly et al., 2024

Extinct genus of mammals

Solanutherium is an extinct genus of mammal that inhabited Argentina during the Late Cretaceous epoch. It contains a single species, Solanutherium walshi.
