= Cronopio (literature) =

Type of fictional person in works by Julio Cortázar

A cronopio is a type of fictional person appearing in works by Argentine writer Julio Cortázar (August 26, 1914–February 12, 1984).

Together with famas (literally fames) and esperanzas (hopes), cronopios are the subject of several short stories in his 1962 book Historias de cronopios y de famas and Cortazar continued to write about cronopios, famas, and esperanzas in other texts through the 1960s.

== Characteristic ==
In general, cronopios are depicted as naive and idealistic, disorganized, unconventional and sensitive creatures, who stand in contrast or opposition to famas (who are rigid, organized and judgmental if well-intentioned) and esperanzas (who are plain, indolent, unimaginative and dull).

In his stories Cortázar describes few physical features of cronopios. He does refer to them (in one of the early stories Costumbres de los famas) as "those greenish, frizzly, wet objects," but this description is just the initial author's vision of the invented character. In a letter to Paul Blackburn on 1959-03-27 Cortázar writes that human characteristics of cronopios appeared later, while writing other stories. These demonstrate aspects of cronopios' personalities, habits, and inclinations.

== Uses of the term ==
Cortázar first used the word cronopio in a 1952 article published in Buenos Aires Literaria reviewing a Louis Armstrong concert given in November of that year in the Théâtre des Champs-Élysées in Paris. The article was entitled Louis, Enormísimo Cronopio ("Louis, Enormous Cronopio"). Cortázar would later describe in various interviews how the word cronopio first came to him in that same theater some time before this concert in the form of an imaginary vision of small green globes floating around the semi-deserted theater.

References to cronopios in Cortázar's work occur in 20 short sketches that make up the last section of Historias de Cronopios y de Famas as well as in his "collage books," La vuelta al día en ochenta mundos and Ultimo Round, which were collected in a French edition he considered definitive. Some literary critics consider Cortazar's cronopios stories as lesser works compared to other of the author's novels and short stories. Others have looked for hidden metaphysical meanings in these stories or for a universal taxonomy of human beings. Cortázar himself described these stories as a sort of "game" and asserted that writing them gave him great joy.

The term cronopio eventually became a kind of honorific, applied by Cortázar (and others) to friends, as in the dedication to the English-language edition of 62: A Model Kit: "This novel and this translation are dedicated to Cronopio Paul Blackburn ..." (Blackburn translated several of Cortazar's early stories under the title The End of the Game.)

A fossil dryolestoid mammal found in Argentina has been named Cronopio dentiacutus.

== Other references ==
- Cortázar has sometimes been called the Grandísimo Cronopio or the Cronopio Mayor by his admirers.
