= Leonardus =

Leonardus Temporal range: Late Santonian-Maastrichtian ~84–66 Ma

Scientific classification
- Domain: Eukaryota
- Kingdom: Animalia
- Phylum: Chordata
- Class: Mammalia
- Clade: Trechnotheria
- Clade: Cladotheria
- Clade: †Meridiolestida
- Genus: †Leonardus; Bonaparte 1990

Type species
- Leonardus cuspidatus Bonaparte 1990

Extinct family of mammals

Leonardus is an extinct mammal genus from the Late Cretaceous (Late Santonian to Maastrichtian) of South America. It is a meridiolestidan, closely related to the also Late Cretaceous Cronopio and the Miocene Necrolestes.

== Description ==
Leonardus is a fairly small mammal, similar in size to Necrolestes. It is known from two specimens, the holotype MACN-RN 172, composed of a left maxilla, four associated molariform teeth and two pairs of alveoli, and MACN-RN 1907, a right mandible with two molariforms. Said molariforms are vaguely peg-like, with a dome-like stylocone.

== Discovery ==
Leonardus is currently only known from the Los Alamitos Formation, Argentina. The holotype was found in 1990, while the second specimen was described more recently in 2010. The genus name honours the Italian paleontologist Giuseppe Leonardi.

== Classification ==
Leonardus was originally referred to Dryolestidae, but the lack of a parastylar hook on the molariforms, as well as a few features of the stylocone, suggest that it was grouped with other South American and African species at the exclusion of Laurasian species, in a clade known as Meridiolestida. Within Meridiolestida, it consistently groups with Necrolestes and Cronopio.

== Paleobiology ==
Leonardus' teeth are noted as being unique among meridiolestids and the animal would have had an orthal and transverse jaw-stroke with tooth-to-tooth shearing, though no further comments have been made on its diet.
