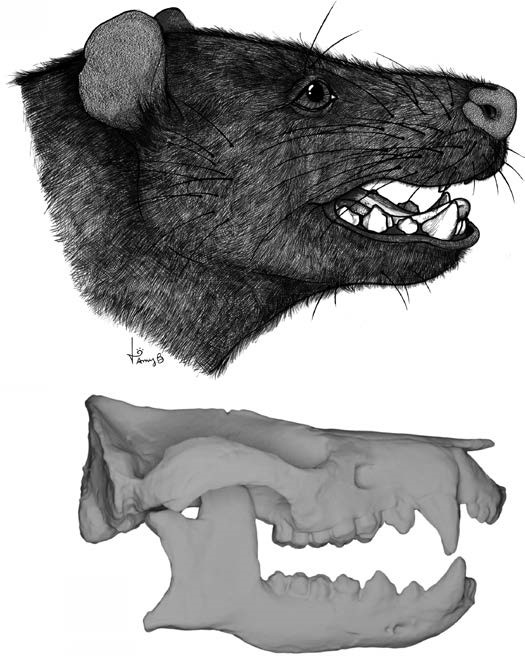
- Life restoration and skull and jaws of Peligrotherium

Scientific classification
- Kingdom: Animalia
- Phylum: Chordata
- Class: Mammalia
- Clade: Cladotheria
- Clade: †Meridiolestida; Rougier, 2011

Subgroups
- See text

= Meridiolestida =

Meridiolestida Temporal range: Late Cretaceous–Miocene Possible Early Cretaceous record
- Skull of Necrolestes

Extinct clade of mammals

Skull of Cronopio

Meridiolestida is an extinct clade of mammals known from the Cretaceous and Cenozoic of South America and possibly Antarctica. They represented the dominant group of mammals in South America during the Late Cretaceous. Meridiolestidans were morphologically diverse, containing both small insectivores such as the "sabretooth-squirrel" Cronopio, as well as the clade Mesungulatoidea/Mesungulatomorpha, which ranged in size from the shrew-sized Reigitherium to the dog-sized Peligrotherium. Mesungulatoideans had highly modified dentition with bunodont (low and rounded) teeth, and were likely herbivores/omnivores. Meridiolestidans are generally classified within Cladotheria, more closely related to living marsupials and placental mammals (Theria) than to monotremes, barring one study recovering them as the sister taxa to spalacotheriid "symmetrodonts". However, more recent studies have stuck to the cladotherian interpretation. Within Cladotheria, they have often been placed in a group called Dryolestoidea together with Dryolestida, a group of mammals primarily known from the Jurassic and Early Cretaceous of the Northern Hemisphere. However, some analyses have found this group to be paraphyletic, with the meridiolestidans being more or less closely related to therian mammals than dryolestidans are. Meridiolestidans differ from dryolestidans in the absence of a parastylar hook on the molariform teeth and the lack of a Meckelian groove.

Lakotalestes from the Early Cretaceous of North America, originally identified as a dryolestid, was noted in one paper to have a tooth morphology closer to that of meridiolestidans. A possible meridiolestidan is known from a tooth fragment, now lost, found in the La Meseta Formation from the Eocene of the Antarctic Peninsula. The latest surviving meridiolestidan was the mole-like burrowing insectivore Necrolestes from the Miocene of Patagonia.

== Taxa ==
- †Amarillodon
- †Austrotriconodon
- †Bondesius
- †Casamiquelia
- †Groebertherium?
- †Lakotalestes?
- †Paraungulatum
- †Quirogatherium
- †Solanutherium
- †Cronopioidea?
  - †Cronopio
  - †Leonardus?
  - †Necrolestes
- †Mesungulatoidea
  - †Peligrotherium
  - †Coloniatherium
  - †Mesungulatum
  - †Orretherium
  - †Regitheriidae
    - †Reigitherium
    - †Yeutherium

Cladogram after Lasseron et al. 2022:

- Cladotheria
  - Meridiolestida
    - Cronopio
    - - Necrolestes
      - - Leonardus
        - Mesungulatoidea
          - Reigitherium
          - - Orretherium
            - - Peligrotherium
              - - Coloniatherium
                - Mesungulatum
  - - Dryolestida
    - - Donodontidae
      - Prototribosphenida
        - Vincelestes
        - - Amphitherium
          - - - Amphibetulimus
              - Nanolestes
            - - Palaeoxonodon
              - Zatheria
                - - Arguimus
                  - Peramus
                - Tribosphenida
