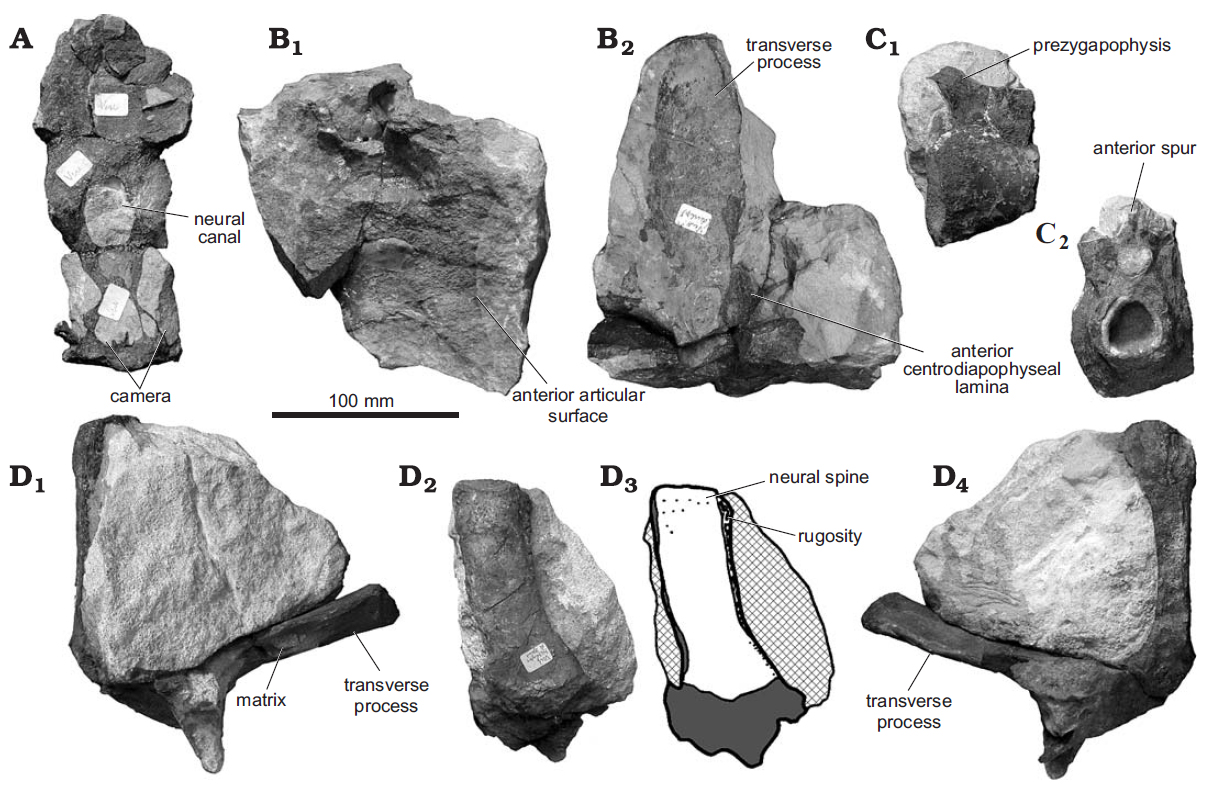
- Vertebrae

Scientific classification
- Kingdom: Animalia
- Phylum: Chordata
- Class: Reptilia
- Clade: Dinosauria
- Clade: Saurischia
- Clade: Theropoda
- Clade: Tetanurae
- Genus: †Cruxicheiros; Benson & Radley, 2010
- Species: †C. newmanorum

Binomial name
- †Cruxicheiros newmanorum Benson & Radley, 2010

= Cruxicheiros =

Cruxicheiros Temporal range: Middle Jurassic (Bathonian), 167 Ma

Extinct genus of dinosaurs

Cruxicheiros (meaning "cross hand") is a genus of theropod dinosaur which lived in the Middle Jurassic of England. The type species is C. newmanorum, described by Roger Benson and Jonathan Radley in 2010.

== Discovery ==
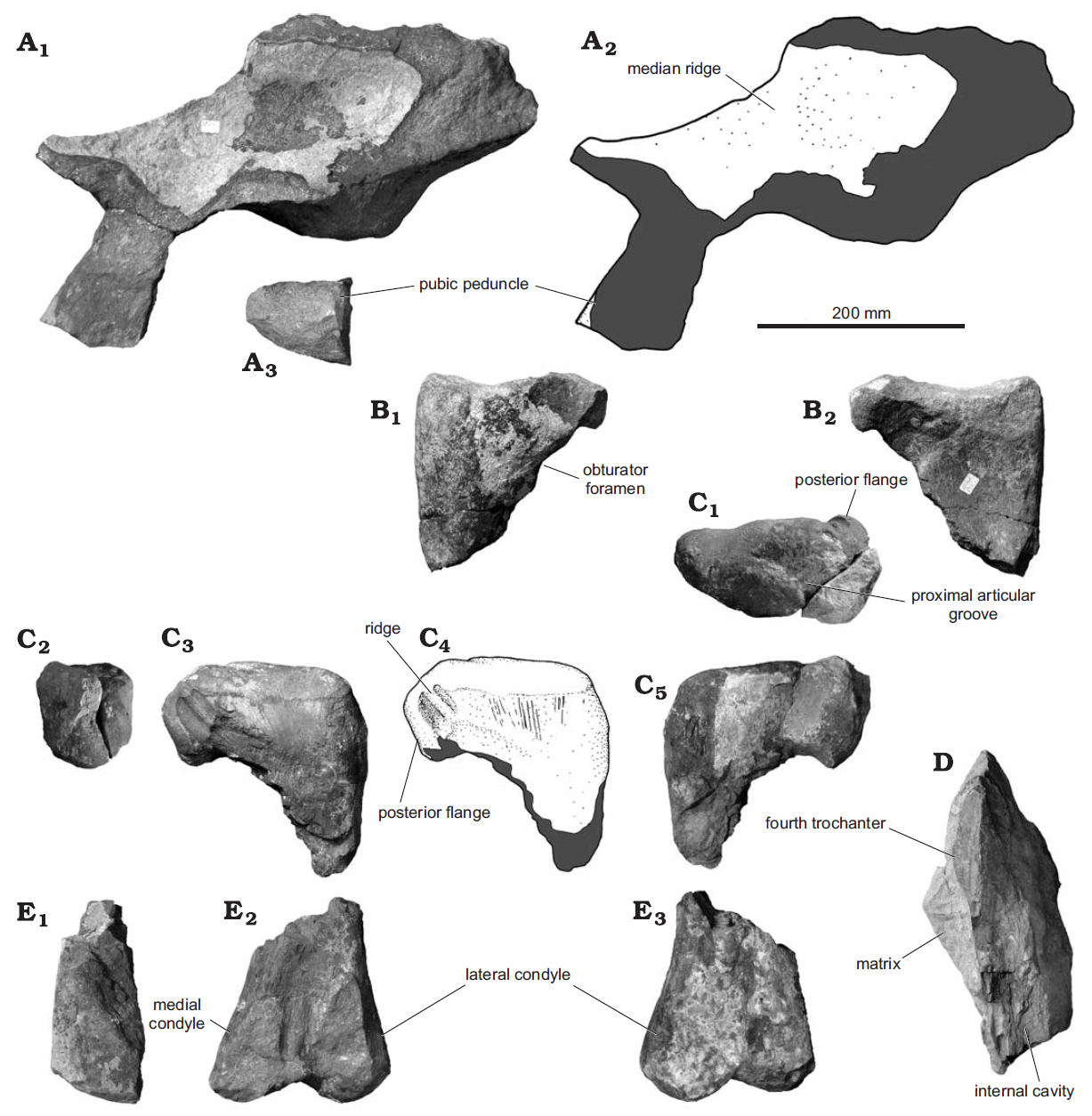
Hip and leg bones

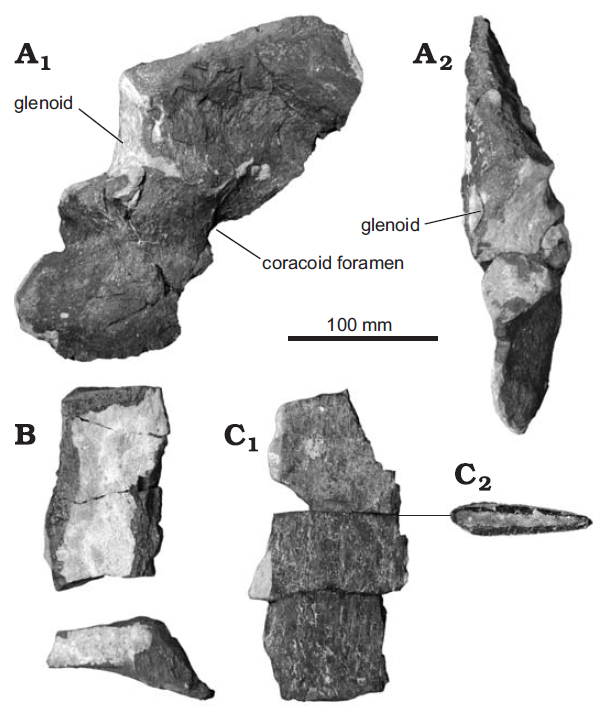
Scapular bones

The remains of the holotype were discovered in the early 1960s in the Cross Hands Quarry, near Little Compton, in Warwickshire in England. These fossils came from the Chipping Norton Limestone Formation, which is dated to the lower Bathonian stage of the Middle Jurassic, about 167 mya (million years ago). The fossils were stored in the Birmingham Museum and Art Gallery until 2008 when they were transferred to the Warwickshire Museum Service; the transfer prompted closer study of the neglected fossils.

Unrecognized fossils of dinosaurs, many of them theropods, had been discovered in England at least as early as 1677. The larger theropod fossils had been attributed (without critical examination) to Megalosaurus, while the smaller ones were assigned to Iliosuchus. The 2010 paper recognized differences between the Cross Hands Quarry discovery and those attributed to Megalosaurus. These differences include lower and broader spines along the animal's back, and differences in leg and hip bones. The authors renamed the Cross Hands Quarry specimens Cruxicheiros newmanorum; the generic name Cruxicheiros comes from a mixture of Latin and Greek, Latin crux meaning "cross" and Greek cheir meaning "hand", in reference to the Cross Hands Quarry locality where the fossils were discovered. The specific name newmanorum honors the Newman family, who own the quarry.

== Description ==
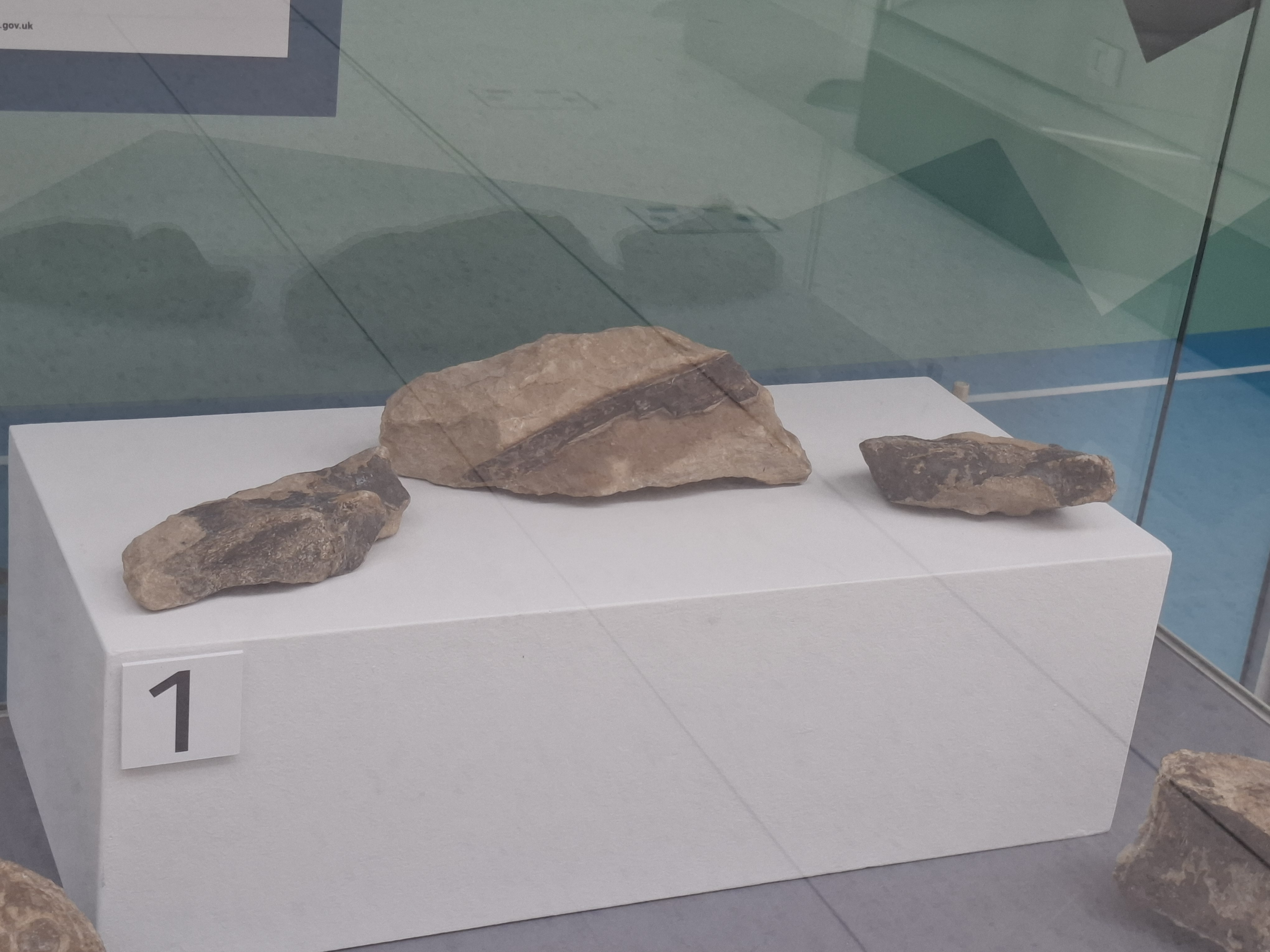
Cruxicheiros newmanorum fossils at the Herbert Art Gallery and Museum

Cruxicheiros was a large theropod, but the known material is very limited. The holotype, cataloged as WARMS G15770, is a partial right femur. Additional material from the site probably comes from the same individual as the holotype, based on examination of the matrix of sandy limestone and calcite which make up all the fossils. The additional material consists of "an anterior dorsal or posterior cervical vertebra; a dorsal neural arch; a partial dorsal vertebra; the anterior half of a middle-distal caudal vertebra; a partial right scapulocoracoid; a partial left ilium; the proximal end of a left pubis; [and] numerous rib and bone fragments". In 2012 Thomas Holtz estimated its length at 9 meters (29.5 feet).

== Phylogeny and classification ==
Cruxicheiros was a tetanuran, a member of the dinosaur group Tetanurae which also includes theropods such as Tyrannosaurus and Spinosaurus. The describers did not place Cruxicheiros in any family. They performed a cladistic analysis which rendered three equally probable positions for Cruxicheiros: as the most basal neotetanuran (the line which gave rise to dinosaurs like Allosaurus and birds), as the most basal megalosauroid (the line which led to Megalosaurus and Spinosaurus), or as the most basal member of the Tetanurae, whose earliest members must have predated the split between these theropod groups. In view of the uncertainties they classified Cruxicheiros as Tetanurae incertae sedis.
