= Reigitherium =

Reigitherium Temporal range: Late Cretaceous, Campanian–Maastrichtian

Scientific classification
- Kingdom: Animalia
- Phylum: Chordata
- Class: Mammalia
- Clade: †Meridiolestida
- Family: †Reigitheriidae
- Genus: †Reigitherium; Bonaparte, 1990
- Species: †R. bunodontum

Binomial name
- †Reigitherium bunodontum Bonaparte, 1990

Extinct family of mammals

Reigitherium was a mammal that lived during the Late Cretaceous (Late Campanian-Maastrichtian). Its fossils have been found in the Los Alamitos and the La Colonia Formations of Argentina.

== Description ==
The original specimen of Reigitherium was a fragmentary single molar tooth, with a lot of the surface detail damaged. It was mistakenly identified as an upper left molar, but new material - including a whole tooth row of this species - clarifies that it was a lower right tooth. On the lower molars, an incomplete transverse ridge ran between the protoconid and metaconid; in the upper molars, this ridge ran between the paracone and stylocone. In both upper and lower molars, a pair of semi-symmetrical basins were located distal and mesial to these ridges.

Reigitherium was a small mammal with simple premolars that increased in size along the tooth row to an enlarged fourth premolar. The molar teeth them decreased in size along the tooth row.

== Taxonomy ==
Reigitherium has proven difficult to classify until recently, because the original fossil material was sparse, damaged, and difficult to identify. It was initially thought to be a dryolestid mammal when described in 1990. Ten years later, Pascual et al. argued that it was a docodont based on the wear patterns they interpreted on the teeth.

In 2011, Rougier et al. argued again for it being a dryolestoid, within Meridiolestida, an order of Gondwanan dryolestoids. More complete fossils have now supported this analysis

A recent phylogenetic study finds it to be the sister taxon to Peligrotherium. Although the latter is much larger than Reigitherium, they share many tooth and skull characteristics that indicate they are closely related. It was also found to be close to Yeutherium, which was placed into Reigitheriidae as only the second genus in the family.
