= National University of Comahue =

Coordinates: 38°56′27″S 68°03′19″W

- Universidad Nacional del Comahue
- Type: Public
- Established: 1972
- Academic staff: 2,376
- Students: 24,419
- Location: various cities, Neuquén, Río Negro and Chubut, Argentina
- Website: uncoma.edu.ar

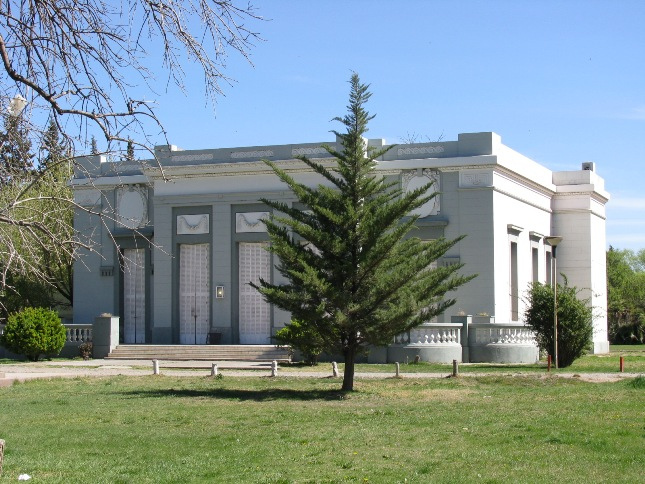
Library Faculty of Education "Casa Peuser".

The National University of Comahue (Spanish: Universidad Nacional del Comahue, UNC / UNCo / Uncoma) is an Argentine national university in the region of Comahue with branches in the provinces of Neuquén, Río Negro and Chubut, with a centre in the city of Neuquén and units in Viedma, Bariloche, San Martín de los Andes, Cipolletti, Zapala, Allen, General Roca, Choele Choel, San Antonio Este, Villa Regina, Esquel, Puerto Madryn and Trelew. It is the largest public university in Argentine Patagonia.

Its university statute (Ordinance # 470/2009) stipulates free admission to all of its programs and ensures freedom of speech for the development of its activities.

As of July 2024 the University has 17 Schools including the School of Languages.

== History ==
Its history can be traced to the University of Neuquén, the provincial university created in 1965 to prevent the migration of students and promote the establishment of teachers, established on land donated by the municipality of Neuquén, an area of 107 hectares, over the annexation of other further land, which in total amounted to 120 hectares that were built in parks and gardens around the premises.

Founded by Doctor Guillermo Rodolfo Pessagno (Neuquen). At first, its teaching curriculum was in the field of Educational Sciences and taught Mathematics, Physics, Chemistry, History, Geography, and Literature Castilian and Natural Sciences as well as covering the fields of Social Anthropology, Psychology, Management, Tourism, Geology and Mining.

In 1971, National University of Comahue was created by national law, under the Taquini Plan. It was created from the University of Neuquén and other colleges scattered throughout the region. On March 15, 1972 the first school year in the new campus began, on the basis of the educational experience of the provincial university and the institutes that preceded it, which had formed several classes of graduates.

The University is based in two areas linked by a common social and cultural history, together called Comahue. The university coat is based on the Mapuche worldview and human figures found in crafts and paintings.

Silvia Blumenfeld was professor of mycology here from 1986 until 2004.

The announcement of the creation of the National University of Río Negro in 2005 generated great uncertainty in the UNC. Initially the project included the extinction of the university, then it was modified to start talking about "complementarity" between the two houses of higher learning. This change helped to achieve the majority support Argentine National Congress.

The Pehuensat-1 satellite was created for educational purposes, built entirely in Argentina. Its launch took place on January 10, 2007 aboard a rocket from a space launch facility in India. The assembly took five years and was conducted by teachers and students of the university.

The satellite was named Pehuensat-1 in reference to the monkey-puzzle tree, an ancient tree and native to the Andean Patagonian forest.

The Argentine satellite weighed 6 pounds, was launched into orbit about 640 miles high and travelled around the Earth at a speed of 25 000 kilometers per hour. It had an aluminum body structure and solar panels on one side. The electronics consisted of a transmitter, a computer and two packs of batteries that were recharged with solar energy. The satellite also had an antenna responsible for transmitting parameters to Earth.

== See also ==
- Science and Education in Argentina
- Argentine Higher Education Official Site
- Argentine Universities
