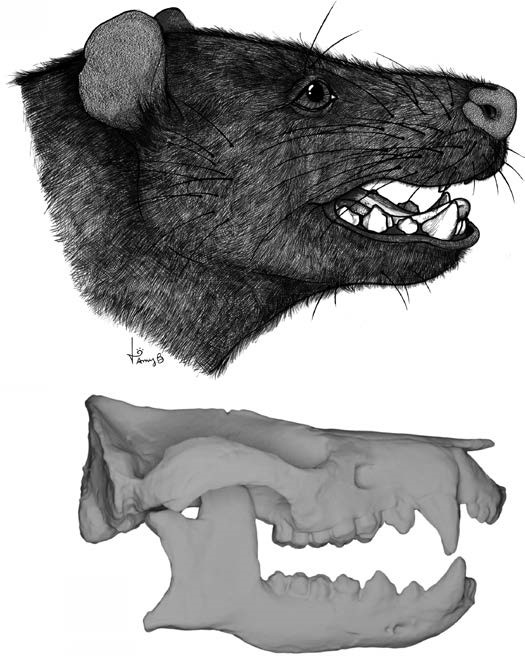
- Life restoration and 3D model of skull and mandibles

Scientific classification
- Kingdom: Animalia
- Phylum: Chordata
- Class: Mammalia
- Clade: †Meridiolestida
- Clade: †Mesungulatoidea
- Family: †Peligrotheriidae; Bonaparte et al., 1993
- Genus: †Peligrotherium; Bonaparte et al., 1993
- Species: †P. tropicalis

Binomial name
- †Peligrotherium tropicalis Bonaparte et al., 1993

= Peligrotherium =

Peligrotherium Temporal range: Early Paleocene (Peligran) ~61.7–58.7 Ma

Extinct genus of mammals

Peligrotherium is an extinct meridiolestidan mammal from the Paleocene of Patagonia, originally interpreted as a stem-ungulate (though it did co-exist with early meridiungulates). Its remains have been found in the Salamanca Formation. Around the size of a dog, it was among the largest of all non-therian mammals, and the largest non-therian mammal known from South America. It is a member of Mesungulatoidea, a clade of herbivorous meridiolestidans with molars that had rounded (bunodont) cusps.

== Description ==
The dental formula of Peligrotherium tropicalis was I4?/? C1/1 P3/3 M3/3. Its last premolar was fully molarised, having morphology strongly akin to a molar, as has been suggested for mesungulatoids broadly. The presence of a high cementoenamel junction with a pronounced ridge showing signs of having undergone oral abrasion suggests that the species had a tall, thick gingiva comparable to that of a hippopotamus.

== Diet ==
A biomechanical study found Peligrotherium to be a herbivore that was functionally similar to the black rhino.
