= 2026 in paleomammalogy =

This article records new taxa of fossil mammals of every kind that are scheduled to be described during the year 2026, as well as other significant discoveries and events related to paleontology of mammals that are scheduled to occur in the year 2026.

== Afrotherians ==
=== Proboscideans ===
Name	Novelty	Status	Authors	Age	Type locality	Country	Notes	Images
Archaeobelodon tassyi	Sp. nov	Valid	Sanders et al.	Miocene	Bakate Formation	Kenya		
Chesalophodon	Gen. et sp. nov	Valid	Eshelman et al.	Miocene (Clarendonian)	Choptank Formation	United States (Virginia)	A gomphothere. The type species is C. gulottai.	
Eochoerodon	Gen. et comb. nov	Valid	Li & Wang	Miocene		China; Pakistan	A member of the family Choerolophodontidae. Genus includes "Choerolophodon" guangheensis Wang & Deng (2011) and "Mastodon (Trilophodon) angustidens" var. palaeindicus Lydekker (1884).	
Parachoerodon	Gen. et sp. et comb. nov	Valid	Li & Wang	Miocene	Halamagai Formation Keramaria Formation Zhangenbao Formation	China; Greece	A member of the family Choerolophodontidae. Genus includes new species P. rhynchus, as well as "Choerolophodon" chioticus Tobien (1980) and "Trilophodon" connexus Hopwood (1935).	
Protanancus presbytatos	Sp. nov	Valid	Sanders et al.	Miocene	Bakate Formation	Kenya		
Zygolophodon microgigas	Sp. nov	Valid	Sanders et al.	Miocene	Bakate Formation	Kenya		

==== Proboscidean research ====
- A study on the morphology of the astragalus and calcaneus in extant and extinct proboscideans, providing evidence of morphological changes of ankles bones related to increase of the body mass and evolution of the columnar posture of members of the group, is published by Tetaert et al. (2026).
- A study on humeri of extant and extinct proboscideans, providing evidence of different impact of compressive loading on humeri representing slender and robust morphotypes, is published by Wagner, Chatar & Hennekam (2026).
- Semprebon, Sanders & Uttecht (2026) reconstruct diets and habitats of Moeritherium and Phiomia on the basis of their tooth wear, interpreting the former taxon as feeding on soft vegetation and likely frequenting aquatic habitats, and interpreting the latter taxon as likely living in a terrestrial forest or woodland environment.
- Alquézar-Blesa et al. (2026) study the feeding behaviors of Miocene Gomphotherium and Prodeinotherium from Artesilla and Tarazona (Spain), reporting evidence from the study of tooth wear indicative of a greater degree of dietary flexibility than indicated by tooth morphology, including evidence of grass consumption.
- Carolin & Bajpai (2026) describe new proboscidean fossil material from the Miocene strata from the Kutch Basin (India), and report evidence of affinities of early to middle Miocene proboscidean taxa from the Indian subcontinent with middle to late Miocene taxa from eastern Mediterranean.
- Bader, Gasparik & Segesdi (2026) compare the microanatomy of femur of Deinotherium giganteum and mammoths, reporting evidence of differences that might be linked to distinct weight-bearing adaptations.
- Description of new fossil material of Mammut shansiense from the Yushe Basin (China) and a study on the phylogenetic affinities of the species is published by Zhang et al. (2026), who recover the studied species as closely related to the American mastodon.
- Sanders, Ji & Jablonski (2026) describe fossil material of Stegodon zhaotongensis from the Miocene strata of the Zhaotong Formation at the Shuitangba site (Yunnan, China), reaffirm the validity of the species, and interpret its anatomical features as consistent with origination of stegodonts from stegolophodonts in Asia.
- Liu et al. (2026) report the first discovery of fossil material of Stegodon from the late Pliocene or early Pleistocene strata from the Shandong Province (China), referred to the species Stegodon chiai.
- A study on the chemical composition of teeth of Gomphotherium angustidens from the Miocene (Langhian) strata from Quinta da Farinheira (Portugal), providing evidence of seasonal changes in the diet of the studied proboscidean and probable evidence of geophagia during fixed times of the year, is published by Coimbra et al. (2026).
- Han et al. (2026) report the discovery of a molar of a member of the genus Gomphotherium from the Miocene strata of the Jinsu Formation (North Korea), extending known geographical distribution of members of this genus in Asia.
- New fossil material of Notiomastodon platensis is described from the Lujanian strata of the La Chumbiada Member of the Lujan Formation (Buenos Aires Province, Argentina) by Prado et al. (2026).
- Evidence from the study of strontium, carbon and oxygen isotopic composition of remains of Notiomastodon platensis from Pleistocene sites in the states of Pernambuco, Paraíba and Sergipe (Brazil), indicative of a predominantly C_{4}-based diet of the studied individuals and indicating that the studied sample included both sedentary and mobile individuals, is presented by Cruz et al. (2026).
- The first complete skull of a member of the genus Cuvieronius (C. cf. tropicus) from North America reported to date is described from the Pleistocene (Irvingtonian) strata of the Camp Rice Formation (New Mexico, United States) by Houde et al. (2026), who argue that North/Central American and South American members of the genus Cuvieronius likely represent two distinct cryptic species.
- González-Guarda et al. (2026) reconstruct the environment of late Pleistocene Notiomastodon platensis and Cuvieronius hyodon from Ecuador on the basis of their tooth wear and carbon isotopic composition of their tooth enamel, interpreted as indicative of predominantly open and dry habitats.
- Kumar (2026) reports the first discovery of fossil material of Anancus sivalensis from Indian Siwaliks, recovered from the Pliocene Tatrot Formation in Himachal Pradesh.
- Lambert (2026) reevaluates the affinites of "Platybelodon" barnumbrowni from the Late Miocene of Nebraska (United States), transferring the species to the genus Protanancus (the first record of the genus from North America), as well as describing "Serbelodon" burnhami and an unnamed taxon from the Bone Valley of Florida as sharing affinities with Protanancus.
- Armaroli et al. (2026) reconstruct the ecology and habitat use of straight-tusked elephants from the Neumark-Nord site (Germany) on the basis of the study of the strontium isotopic composition of their remains and on the basis of proteomic analysis, reporting evidence indicating that the studied elephant assemblage included both male and female individuals from geographically separated populations that migrated to the lake basins of Neumark-Nord, and evidence of seasonal mobility of the studied individuals, including probable evidence of two male individuals dwelling in mountainous areas within 300 km of Neumark-Nord.
- Farrell et al. (2026) identify fossil material of a straight-tusked elephant from the mid-Pleistocene North Bridge Acheulian site north of Gesher Benot Ya'aqov (Israel), and interpret its tooth wear and isotopic composition of its tooth enamel, coupled with the studies of local palynological assemblages and climatic reconstructions, as indicative of a mixed-feeding strategy of the studied individual, as well as indicating that it lived in a mosaic woodland-wetland habitat with a Mediterranean climate.
- Kusaka et al. (2026) provide the radiocarbon ages of fossils of Palaeoloxodon naumanni from Honshu and Shikoku (Japan), determine the last appearance date of the species to be 36,400–35,700 calibrated years before present, and interpret the fossil record as indicative of short coexistence of the species with Upper Paleolithic humans and its likely extinction at 35,000-33,000 calibrated years before present.
- Evidence from the study of the long bones of adult Palaeoloxodon tiliensis and juvenile Palaeoloxodon falconeri, indicating that bones of the former species were not scaled-down version of bones of its mainland ancestors but rather included a combination of ancestral traits, adaptations associated with a graviportal lifestyle and juvenile-like characteristics, is presented by Bader, Göhlich & Houssaye (2026).
- Evidence from the study of the straight-tusked elephant specimen from Middle Pleistocene site of Contrada Monticelli (Apulia, Italy) and other specimens of straight-tusked elephants and Mammuthus meridionalis from the Lower and Middle Pleistocene of Italy, indicating that the majority of purported morphological characters differentiating Mammuthus and Palaeoloxodon are not reliable when intraspecific variability is taken into consideration, is presented by Stefanelli et al. (2026).
- A study on the anatomy and life history of the woolly mammoth specimen from Niederweningen (Switzerland) that was the first scientifically described perinatal mammoth individual is published by Scarborough et al. (2026).
- Moreland et al. (2026) recover ancient DNA from mammoth ivory from the Hohle Fels cave (Germany), and report evidence of presence of mammoth specimens from multiple distinct lineages in the studied sample.
- Zanina et al. (2026) reconstruct the environment and diet of the woolly mammoth calf specimen "Yana" from the Batagay section (Sakha, Russia) on the basis of the study of contents of its gastrointestinal tract and the material found between its forelimbs.
- A new, nearly complete skeleton of a woolly mammoth, identified as a male aged approximately 30–40 years, is described from the latest Pleistocene strata from the Taymyr Peninsula (Russia) by Petrova et al. (2026).
- Lopatina et al. (2026) reconstruct the habitat of the woolly mammoth specimen discovered at the Kotelny Island (Sakha Republic, Russia) in 2019, reporting evidence of presence of open environment dominated by grass-dwarf shrub associations near the end of the Marine Isotope Stage 3.
- Moots et al. (2026) determine sex of 521 woolly mammoth specimens on the basis of the study of ancient DNA, reporting evidence indicating that mammoths from bone accumulation sites were predominantly female, while mammoths from other depositional settings were predominantly male, and interpret these findings as suggestive of anthropogenic origin of mammoth bone accumulations and of preferential targeting of mammoth females by humans.
- Hannold et al. (2026) reconstruct the diets of pygmy mammoths from Northern Channel Islands and Columbian mammoths from Rancho La Brea and coastal Santa Barbara in southern California on the basis of stable isotopes in tooth enamel.
- Evidence from the study of tooth enamel of Columbian mammoths from 14 sites in the Central Basin of Mexico, interpreted as indicative of a generalist diet with varying proportions of C_{3} and C_{4} plants, is presented by Rodríguez-Franco et al. (2026).
- Rodríguez-Franco et al. (2026) report evidence of dental anomalies in Columbian mammoth specimens from 15 localities in the Basin of Mexico.
- Evidence from the study of carbon, oxygen and strontium isotope composition of Columbian mammoth remains from the Colby Site (Wyoming, United States), indicative of the studied mammoths feeding mainly on C_{3} plants and having a range of less than 250 km, is presented by Doering, Mackie & Herron (2026), who interpret the assemblage of mammoth remains from the studied site as more likely resulting from multiple hunting episoded than from a single massive one.
- Evidence indicating that morphology of the astragalus of Quaternary elephantids was influenced by their body size to a greater degree than by their phylogenetic affinities is presented by Fidalgo et al. (2026).

=== Sirenians ===
Name	Novelty	Status	Authors	Age	Type locality	Country	Notes	Images
Kharisiren	Gen. et sp. nov		Saha et al.	Miocene	Khari Nadi Formation	India	A member of the family Dugongidae. Genus includes new species K. cristata.	
Prototherium transylvanicum	Sp. nov	Valid	Codrea et al.	Eocene	Cluj Limestone Formation	Romania		

==== Sirenia research ====
- Saha, Bhardwaj & Bajpai (2026) study the restructuring of the sirenian skull throughout the evolutionary history of the group on the basis of data from extant and fossil taxa.
- Wagner et al. (2026) provide a methodology for quantification of the degree of pachyostosis in ribs and vertebrae of sirenians on the basis of the study of extant and extinct taxa.
- Pérez-Ramos et al. (2026) present a virtual reconstruction of the vertebral column of Pezosiren portelli.
- New fossil material of sirenians with dugongid affinities, associated with an invertebrate assemblage that might be indicative of presence of seagrass habitats, is described from the Oligocene strata of the Maniyara Fort Formation (India) by Joshi et al. (2026).
- Shinmura & Sawada (2026) reconstruct diets of sirenians from Miocene to Pliocene marine sediments in Hokkaido (Japan) on the basis of stable carbon isotope ratios of fatty acids and sterols extracted from their bones, providing evidence of Metaxytherium feeding on seagrass and evidence of feeding of Dusisiren and the Takikawa sea cow on seaweed.

=== Other afrotherians ===
Name	Novelty	Status	Authors	Age	Type locality	Country	Notes	Images
Armenohyrax	Gen. et sp. nov	Valid	Becker et al.	Pliocene		Armenia	A member of the family Pliohyracidae. The type species is A. aznavouriani.	
Lessnessina martinorum	Sp. nov	Valid	Hooker	Eocene (Ypresian)	Blackheath Formation	United Kingdom	A mammal with affinities with Paenungulata.	

==== Miscellaneous afrotherian research ====
- Alcalá et al. (2026) describe new fossil material of Pliohyrax graecus from the Miocene (Vallesian) strata from the La Roma 2 site (Province of Teruel, Spain), representing the most complete hyracoid record from the Iberian Peninsula reported to date.
- Raynaud et al. (2026) interpret the composition of the Eocene plant assemblage from the Bultu-Zile site (Meryemdere Formation; Turkey), reconstructed on the basis of study of the palynoflora from this site, as indicating that embrithopods from the site lived in a swamp-freshwater environment, representing one of the first embrithopod records outside mangrove-dominated ecosystems.
- Evidence from the study isotopic composition of tooth enamel of Eocene embrithopods from Balkanatolia, interpreted as indicative of the studied mammals living in fully terrestrial rather than semi-aquatic environment, is presented by Robert et al. (2026).

== Euarchontoglires ==
=== Primates ===
Name	Novelty	Status	Authors	Age	Type locality	Country	Notes	Images
Agerinia yaminae	Sp. nov		Godinot in Tabuce et al.	Eocene		France		
Guangxilemur rarissimus	Sp. nov		Chaimanee et al.	Eocene	Pondaung Formation	Myanmar	A member of the family Sivaladapidae.	
Lemucolobus	Gen. et sp. nov		Arenson et al.	Miocene	Lemudong'o Formation	Kenya	An Old World monkey belonging to the subfamily Colobinae. Genus includes new species L. orkimusei.	
Masripithecus	Gen. et sp. nov	Valid	Al-Ashqaret al.	Miocene	Moghra Formation	Egypt	An ape that was phylogenetically closer to the crown group of apes than coeval apes from East Africa. Genus includes new species M. moghraensis.	
Migmacebus	Gen. et sp. nov		Marivaux et al.	Miocene	Solimões Formation	Brazil	A New World monkey belonging to the family Cebidae. Genus includes new species M. juruaensis.	
Olotimcolobus	Gen. et sp. nov		Arenson et al.	Miocene	Lemudong'o Formation	Kenya	An Old World monkey belonging to the subfamily Colobinae. Genus includes new species O. narokensis.	
Parabrachyteles	Gen. et sp. nov		Marivaux et al.	Miocene	Solimões Formation	Brazil	A New World monkey belonging to the family Atelidae. Genus includes new species P. vesperus.	
Pliogalago	Gen. et sp. nov		Harrison & Haile-Selassie	Pliocene		Ethiopia	A galago. Genus includes new species P. makahmera.	
Saharopithecus	Gen. et sp. nov		Jaeger et al.	Eocene		Libya	A simian of uncertain affinities, sharing molar characters with both proteopithecids and propliopithecids. Genus includes new species S. salemi.	
Tetonius varleyorum	Sp. nov		Rhinehart, Anemone & Beard	Eocene	Wasatch Formation	United States (Wyoming)	A member of the family Omomyidae.	

==== Primate research ====
- Evidence of gradual expansion of the frontal lobe during the evolutionary history of primates, as well as evidence of rapid expansion of nonfrontal neocortical regions that might have been linked to enhanced visual processing in primates, is presented by Kay et al. (2026).
- Cartmill & Brown (2026) review the history of the visual-predation theory, and argue that it represents the best available explanation for the origin of primates.
- A study on the morphology of molar teeth of extant and extinct members of Euarchonta, providing evidence of evolution of morphological changes associated with increased herbivory at the base of Euprimates, is published by Bradley-Cronkwright et al. (2026).
- Marigó et al. (2026) review new discoveries and main advances in the study of Paleogene primates from Spain from late 2013 to 2025.
- One of the oldest euprimate petrosal bones reported to date, likely belonging to Marcgodinotius indicus, is described from the Eocene strata from the Vastan Lignite Mine (India) by Silcox et al. (2026).
- Alfieri et al. (2026) reconstruct the locomotor behavior of Malagasy Quaternary lemurs on the basis of the study of their humeral and femoral trabecular architecture, reporting evidence of suspensory adaptations not only in sloth lemurs, but also in Megaladapis edwardsi.
- Robinson et al. (2026) report evidence from the study of carbon and oxygen stable isotope compositions of mammal fossils from the Pinturas Formation (Argentina) indicative of presence of a diverse range of habitats in Patagonia during the Miocene, and interpret the diversity of the primate assemblage from the studied formation as likely linked to habitat diversity.
- Cooke et al. (2026) report the first discovery of mandibular remains of Stirtonia victoriae from the La Victoria Formation (Colombia), and interpret their anatomy as indicative of leaf-eating adaptations of the studied monkey.
- Urciuoli et al. (2026) determine the phylogenetic relationships of early members of Catarrhini on the basis of the study of the semicircular canal and vestibule shape in Saadanius, Pliobates, Ekembo and Victoriapithecus, interpret Saadanius as most likely to be a stem catarrhine that evolved ossified tubular ectotympanic independently from crown catarrhines, and interpret pliopithecoids as most likely to be stem catarrhines closer to the crown group than Saadanius.
- Arias-Martorell et al. (2026) report evidence of similarities of shape of the radial head of Pliobates cataloniae and extant apes, and interpret Pliobates as better adapted to climbing than to behaviors involving forelimb-dominated suspension.
- Arias-Martorell et al. (2026) compare the shape of the distal part of the humerus of Pliobates cataloniae and other extinct and extant simians, and interpret Pliobates as unlikely to perform acrobatic suspensory behaviors seen in extant gibbons.
- McGechie et al. (2026) interpret elevated variability of shape of pliopithecoid molars from the Miocene strata from the Rudabánya II site (Hungary) as unlikely be caused by sexual dimorphism.
- Pickford & de Matos (2026) revise the fossil record of at least three assemblages of Old World monkeys from the Humpata Plateau (Angola), including possible record of a mandrill-like monkey from the middle Pliocene assemblage from Tchiua.
- A study on the composition of the Old World monkey assemblage (dominated by Colobus sp. and Chlorocebus sp.) from the Pleistocene Markaytoli site (Ethiopia) is published by Smail et al. (2026).
- Jablonski, Tryon & McBrearty (2026) study the composition of the Middle Pleistocene monkey assemblage from the Kapthurin Formation (Kenya), reporting evidence of similarities to modern eastern African faunas, but also evidence of presence of extinct Theropithecus oswaldi leakeyi.
- Pallas (2026) identifies fossil mandibles from the Pleistocene sites Asbole (Ethiopia) and Koobi Fora (Kenya) belonging to members of the tribe Colobini, including a taxon with similarities to members of the genus Colobus and a taxon with similarities to members of the Piliocolobus-Procolobus lineage.
- Pickford (2026) revises Dinopithecus ingens, interprets it as possibly more closely related to geladas than to mandrills or baboons, and assigns "Dinopithecus" brumpti to the genus Omopithecus (interpreted by the author as distinct from Theropithecus).
- Evidence from the study of tooth wear of Theropithecus oswaldi from the Pliocene strata from Makapansgat and from the Pleistocene strata from Swartkrans (South Africa), indicative of different dietary behaviors of Pliocene and Pleistocene members of the species (with the diet of the Pliocene specimens including more mechanically resistant food), is presented by L'Engle Williams, Schmidt & Remy (2026).
- Hidalgo-Trujillo et al. (2026) report evidence from the study of tooth wear indicative of dietary differentiation of extinct papionins from the Turkana Basin.
- Evidence of similarity of molar morphology to those of members of the genus Papio, and likely evidence of opportunistic feeding strategies, is reported in a specimen of Paradolichopithecus aff. arvernensis from the Dafnero-3 site (Greece) by Plastiras et al. (2026); Koutalis et al. (2026) present virtually reconstructed models of the face of the same individual.
- Choudhary et al. (2026) provided new paleomagnetic and stratigraphic data for the Ramnagar region of India, re-dating its primate-yielding localities to 13.03–11.59 Ma and extending the known chronological range of the primates like Sivapithecus, Kapi and Ramadapis by approximately 200,000 years.
- Ortiz et al. (2026) determine enamel thickness in the lower third molar of Kapi ramnagarensis, recovering it within the lower end of the range of enamel thickness in extant gibbons.
- Evidence from the study of the cranial endocast of Rudapithecus hungaricus, indicative of presence of sulcal patterns similar to those seen in gorillas, is presented by Assance, Silcox & Begun (2026).
- Spassov et al. (2026) report the discovery of a nearly complete femur of cf. Graecopithecus from the Miocene strata from the Azmaka-6 locality near Chirpan (Bulgaria), sharing morphological traits with both quadrupeds and bipeds, and interpreted as indicative of a transitional locomotor repertoire including both terrestrial quadrupedalism and an early form of facultative bipedalism.
- Evidence from the study of teeth and the bony labyrinth of Oreopithecus bambolii, interpreted as indicating that the studied primate was more likely to be a derived stem hominoid than a close relative of Miocene apes from Europe or gibbons, is presented by Urciuoli et al. (2026).
- Jansma & Locke (2026) interpret Xenopithecus koruensis as a valid basal hominoid taxon distinct from Proconsul africanus.
- Williams et al. (2026) study the anatomy of ulna and femur or Sahelanthropus tchadensis, interpreted as indicative of presence of adaptations to bipedalism in spite of similarities in size and geometric morphometric shape to bones of chimpanzees.
- De Jager et al. (2026) study the frequency, position, and variability of cortical sulcal imprints in endocasts of extant chimpanzees and bonobos, providing a comparative resource for the studies of the brain evolution based on hominin fossils.
- Dunbar (2026) reevaluates data from the study of Deaner & Nunn (1999), finds evidence of changes in brain size following increases in body size in the evolution of primates but in a more complicated way that suggested by the original brain lag hypothesis, with an increase in body size followed by a progressively greater increase in brain size, and finds evidence of such evolution of brain and body size in hominins.

=== Rodents ===
Name	Novelty	Status	Authors	Age	Type locality	Country	Notes	Images
Acarechimys manumanta	Sp. nov	Valid	Arnal et al.	Miocene	Bala Formation	Peru	A member of Caviomorpha belonging to Pan-Octodontoidea.	
Apeomys catahoulaensis	Sp. nov	Valid	Albright et al.	Oligocene	Catahoula Formation	United States (Mississippi)	A member of the family Eomyidae.	
Atalayamys	Gen. et sp. nov	Valid	Arnal et al.	Miocene	Bala Formation	Peru	A member of Caviomorpha of uncertain affinities. The type species is A. incertum.	
Clethrionomys sibiricola	Sp. nov	Valid	Borodin & Tesakov	Pleistocene		Russia (Omsk Oblast)	A species of Clethrionomys.	
Ctenomys andinus	Sp. nov		De Santi et al.	Uncertain, likely late Pliocene or older		Bolivia	A tuco-tuco.	
Debruijnimys primaevus	Sp. nov	Valid	Agustí et al.	Pliocene		Spain	A gerbil.	
Dekamyarion	Gen. et comb. nov	Valid	Van de Weerd & Wessels	Oligocene		Bosnia and Herzegovina; Turkey	A member of the family Spalacidae. The type species is Eucricetodon oculatus van de Weerd, de Bruijn & Wessels (2021); genus also includes "Eucricetodon" ruber van de Weerd, de Bruijn & Wessels (2021).	
Desmodillus stoetzeli	Sp. nov		Linchamps et al.	Pliocene and Pleistocene		South Africa	A relative of the cape short-eared gerbil.	
Downsimus rainsi	Sp. nov	Valid	Albright et al.	Oligocene	Catahoula Formation	United States (Mississippi)	A member of the family Aplodontiidae.	
Enviramys	Gen. et 2 sp. nov	Valid	Fontoura in Fontoura et al.	Miocene	Solimões Formation	Brazil	A member of Erethizontoidea. The type species is E. vucetichae; genus also includes E. nasifae.	
Honeymys hoffmeisteri	Sp. nov	Valid	Kelly, Martin & Holroyd	Miocene (Hemphillian)	Garrity Formation	United States (California)	A member of the family Cricetidae, possibly belonging to the subfamily Sigmodontinae.	
Karnimata longimurus	Sp. nov		Zhang et al.	Miocene		China	A member of the family Muridae.	
Luantus silbamanta	Sp. nov	Valid	Arnal et al.	Miocene	Bala Formation	Peru	A member of Caviomorpha belonging to the group Cavioidea.	
Manumys	Gen. et sp. nov	Valid	Arnal et al.	Miocene	Bala Formation	Peru	A member of Caviomorpha belonging to the group Chinchilloidea. The type species is M. materdei.	
Marianamys	Gen. et sp. nov	Valid	Arnal et al.	Miocene	Bala Formation	Peru	A member of Caviomorpha belonging to the group Chinchilloidea. The type species is M. altadens.	
Matsigenkamys	Gen. et sp. nov	Valid	Arnal et al.	Miocene	Bala Formation	Peru	A New World porcupine. The type species is M. ericius.	
Micronoamys	Gen. et sp. nov	Valid	Fontoura in Fontoura et al.	Miocene	Solimões Formation	Brazil	A member of Erethizontoidea. The type species is M. candelae.	
Nannospalax sirakovi	Sp. nov	Valid	Popov	Pleistocene		Bulgaria	A member of the family Spalacidae.	
Nebraskocitellus	Gen. et sp. nov	Valid	Goodwin	Pleistocene (Blancan)		United States (Nebraska)	A ground squirrel. Genus includes new species N. voorhiesi.	
Paraktioeomys	Gen. et sp. nov	Valid	Albright et al.	Oligocene	Catahoula Formation	United States (Mississippi)	A member of the family Eomyidae. The type species is P. palmeri.	
Peruchinchilla	Gen. et sp. nov	Valid	Arnal et al.	Miocene	Bala Formation	Peru	A member of Caviomorpha belonging to Pan-Chinchillidae. The type species is P. prima.	
Protatera salvadori	Sp. nov	Valid	Agustí et al.	Pliocene		Spain	A member of Gerbillidae.	
Ricardomys antiqua	Sp. nov	Valid	Arnal et al.	Miocene	Bala Formation	Peru	A member of Caviomorpha belonging to Pan-Octodontoidea and to the (possibly not monophyletic) group Adelphomyinae.	
Rudiomys drummondensis	Sp. nov	Valid	Hopkins & Calede	Oligocene	Renova Formation	United States (Montana)	A member of the family Aplodontiidae.	
Rudiomys intsook	Sp. nov	Valid	Hopkins & Calede	Oligocene	Renova Formation	United States (Montana)	A member of the family Aplodontiidae.	
Sibirosiphneus ingenuus	Sp. nov	Valid	Zazhigin & Golovanov	Pliocene	Beteke Formation	Russia (Omsk Oblast)	A zokor.	
Sibirosiphneus seletiensis	Sp. nov	Valid	Zazhigin & Golovanov	Pliocene	Selety Formation	Kazakhstan	A zokor.	
Sibirosiphneus sukhovi	Sp. nov	Valid	Golovanov, Yakovlev & Lopatin	Pleistocene		Russia	A zokor.	
Typhlomys latidens	Sp. nov		Zhang et al.	Miocene		China	A member of the family Platacanthomyidae.	
Yakamys	Gen. et sp. nov		Chaimanee et al.	Eocene		Thailand	A member of the family Ischyromyidae. The type species is Y. sirindhornae.	

==== Rodent research ====
- Evidence from the study of teeth of extant and extinct rodents indicative of over sixty independent acquisitions of hypsodonty in the group is presented by Guyonneau, Gomes Rodrigues & Billet (2026).
- A study on the fossil record of Asian rodents spanning the last 55 million years, providing evidence of impact of tectonic and climatic changes on ecomorphological diversity of Asian rodent assemblages throughouth their evolutionary history, is published by Peng & Hopkins (2026).
- Pfaff, Ruf & Le Maître (2026) determine the locomotory behavior of extinct members of Eusciurida on the basis of the study of middle and inner ear of extant and extinct rodents, interpreting early rodents and sciurids as fossorial, with adaptations to arboreal lifestyle evolving in later taxa.
- Review of research on systematics of fossil dormice from Mediterranean islands from the preceding years is published by Fox & Hennekam (2026).
- Wei et al. (2026) reconstruct the evolutionary history of marmots on the basis of paleontological and molecular data.
- A study on tooth wear of Heteroxerus rubricati, providing evidence of dietary plasticity linked to regional environmental shifts, is published by Quesada et al. (2026).
- Murchie et al. (2026) report evidence of preservation of ancient environmental DNA of diverse Quaternary organisms from eastern Beringia in the Pleistocene and Holocene ground squirrel coprolites from Yukon (Canada), including evidence of previously unrecognized genetic diversity of Arctic members of the genus Urocitellus.
- Li, Bi & Li (2026) present the first virtual endocasts of Paleogene ctenodactyloids Exmus mini and Bounomys ulantatalensis.
- The first fossil material of Hystrix subcristata from Taiwan is reported from the Pleistocene Chiting Formation by Halaçlar & Lin (2026).
- Gutstein et al. (2026) describe fossil material of a member of the genus Cardiatherium from the Bahía Inglesa Formation (Chile), providing evidence of wetter environmental conditions in the area of present-day Pacific coast of the Atacama Desert during the late Miocene.
- Buldrini et al. (2026) describe fossil material of Phugatherium sp. from the Pliocene strata of Mininco Formation (Chile), extending known distribution of capybaras west of the Andes.
- Arnaudo & Arnal (2026) describe the anatomy of inner and middle ears of Acarechimys minutissimus, finding no evidence of specializations for subterranean, aquatic or jumping locomotion.
- Selvatici et al. (2026) determine a previously unidentified mummified animal from the Homestake Gulch site (Yukon, Canada) as a late Holocene (approximately 3000-years-old) New World porcupine, report the recovery of the first complete ancient mitochondrial genome of a member of this species, and interpret this finding as evidence of appearance of the New World porcupines in the studied area after the appearance of the boreal forest in the aftermath of the Last Glacial Period.
- Carrillo et al. (2026) study the evolutionary history of caviomorph rodents on the basis of data from extant and extinct members of the group, providing evidence of different trajectories of taxonomic and morphological diversification of Chinchilloidea and Octodontoidea.
- Evidence from the study of tooth wear of caviomorph rodents from the Paleogene strata of the Shapaja in Peruvian Amazonia, indicative of diverse dietary strategies of the studied rodents, is presented by Robinet et al. (2026).
- Álvarez, Ercoli & Cassini (2026) reconstruct proportions and sizes of masticatory muscles of Actenomys priscus, Dolicavia sp., Eucelophorus chapalmalensis, Eumysops sp., Pithanotomys chapalmalensis, Prospaniomys priscus and Telicomys giganteus.
- Lubbers & Famoso (2026) compare tooth enamel in beaver fossils from the John Day region of Oregon (United States), and find no evidence of a significant difference of enamel complexity between fossorial and semiaquatic taxa.
- Delinschi et al. (2026) confirm the validity of Sarmatosminthus gabuniai on the basis of the analysis of fossil material from Vallesian sites in Moldova, Romania and Ukraine.
- A study on the evolution of incisors of Eocene-Oligocene muroid rodents from Balkanatolia is published by van de Weerd et al. (2026).
- Lopatin (2026) describes fossil material of members of the family Platacanthomyidae from the Pleistocene strata from Vietnam, including the first known fossil material of the Chapa pygmy dormouse and Typhlomys taxuansis.
- A study on the phylogenetic relationships and evolutionary history of members of the cricetid subfamily Democricetodontinae is published by Sualdea et al. (2026).
- Rico & Terry (2026) identify skull traits that are best predictors of body length and weight of pack rats and reconstruct the evolution of body size of pack rats from the Paisley Caves (Oregon, United States) throughout the past 15,000 years.
- Baca et al. (2026) reconstruct the evolutionary history of the field vole species complex based on data from modern mitogenomes and nuclear genomes and from ancient genomes of specimens spanning the last 75,000 years.
- Alfaro-Ibáñez et al. (2026) study mitochondrial genomes of Pleistocene tundra voles from the El Mirón Cave (Spain), and identify a novel, extinct southern European haplogroup within this species.
- Evidence from the study of molars of Stenocranius anglicus (European narrow-headed vole) from Middle Pleistocene to Holocene localities in Czech Republic and Slovakia, indicative of more pronounced morphological variation between populations from different sites than between stratigraphic stages and of long-term survival of the species in isolated populations, is presented by Dubjelová et al. (2026).
- Desclaux et al. (2026) reconstruct the evolutionary history of members of the genus Arvicola in Western Europe during the late Middle and Late Pleistocene on the basis of the study of morphology of teeth from the Lazaret Cave and Moula-Guercy sites (France), Abauntz Cave, Cova Eirós (Spain) and Trou Al'Wesse (Belgium), interpreted as consistent with a complex biogeographic history including multiple dispersals into Western Europe and subsequent local extinctions and recolonizations.
- New fossil material of members of the genus Byzantinia, providing new information on the morphology of teeth of members of this genus and their evolution, is described from the Miocene strata of the Zahleh Formation (Lebanon) by López-Antoñanzas et al. (2026).
- A study on the phylogenetic relationships and evolutionary history of extant and extinct hamsters is published by Dirnberger et al. (2026).
- Bujalska et al. (2026) reconstruct the evolutionary history of European small hamsters on the basis of mitochondrial genomes from Late Pleistocene and Holocene remains from Central and Western Europe, the Balkans and Anatolia, identifying evidence of presence of the winter white dwarf hamster in Central Europe during the Late Pleistocene.
- Pacheco-Castro, Carranza-Castañeda & Wang (2026) report the discovery of fossil material of Sigmodon minor from the Pliocene strata of the San Miguel de Allende Basin, representing the first record of the species from central Mexico and its southernmost known record in North America.

=== Other euarchontoglires ===
Name	Novelty	Status	Authors	Age	Type locality	Country	Notes	Images
Chowa	Nom. nov	Valid	Deshmukh	Paleocene	Wanghudun Formation	China	A basal member of Glires and the order Mimotonida; a replacement name for Mina Li et al. (2016).	
Oligolagus	Gen. et sp. nov	Valid	Albright et al.	Oligocene	Catahoula Formation	United States (Mississippi)	A member of Lagomorpha. The type species is O. welleri.	

==== Miscellaneous euarchontoglires research ====
- Zhang & Wang (2026) revise and study the affinities of fossil lagomorphs from China.
- A study on the anatomy and affinities of Gymnesicolagus gelaberti is published by Čermák et al. (2026).
- Zhang & Wang (2026) describe new fossil material of Desmatolagus gobiensis from the Oligocene strata from the Ulantatal site (Inner Mongolia, China) and study the phylogenetic relationships of the species, interpreting it as a basal member of Ochotonidae.
- Kalaitzi & Kostopoulos (2026) study the forelimb and hindlimb morphology of Trischizolagus dumitrescuae, interpreted as indicative of adaptations for controlled, agile leaping, as well as indicative of more developed running abilities compared to typical rabbits but without the extreme specialization seen in hares.
- Chester et al. (2026) report the discovery of fossil material of Purgatorius from the Denver Formation (Colorado, United States), representing the first record of a Puercan plesiadapiform south of Montana reported to date.
- Evidence from the study of virtual endocasts of extant and extinct members of Euarchontoglires, indicative of a shared ancestral endocranial shape in early members of the group, indicating that treeshrews are not a good model for the ancestral endocranial shape in Euarchontoglires, and indicating that primates evolved their modern endocranial morphologies faster than other members of Euarchontoglires, is presented by Lang et al. (2026)

== Laurasiatherians ==
=== Artiodactyls ===
==== Cetaceans ====
Name	Novelty	Status	Authors	Age	Type locality	Country	Notes	Images
Ankylorhiza serratidens	Sp. nov	Valid	Boessenecker	Oligocene	Ashley Formation	United States (South Carolina)	A toothed whale, possibly a member of the family Agorophiidae.	
Bartoncetus	Gen. et comb. nov	Valid	Van Vliet et al.	Eocene	Barton Clay Formation	United Kingdom; Germany? Italy?	A member of the family Basilosauridae. The type species is "Zeuglodon" wanklyni Seeley (1876).	
Calafiacetus	Gen. et sp. nov	Valid	Solis-Añorve et al.	Oligocene	El Cien Formation	Mexico	A member of Chaeomysticeti. Genus includes new species C. longipinna.	
Fordycetus	Gen. et sp. nov		Tanaka, Ortega & Fordyce	Miocene	Mount Harris Formation	New Zealand	A member of the family Squalodelphinidae. Genus includes new species F. taitonga.	
Kalakocetus	Gen. et sp. nov	Valid	Waqas et al.	Eocene	Subathu Formation	India	A basal cetacean. Genus includes new species K. aurorae.	
Mesokentriodon	Gen. et sp. nov	Valid	Lambert et al.	Miocene	Pisco Formation	Peru	A kentriodontid dolphin. Genus includes new species M. protohumboldti.	
Miminiacetus barrancai	Sp. nov	Valid	Lambert et al.	Miocene	Pisco Formation	Peru	A member of Delphinida.	
Miophyseter gunmaensis	Sp. nov		Kimura & Hasegawa	Miocene		Japan		
Pterocetus diamantinae	Sp. nov	Valid	Bianucci & Collareta in Peng et al.	Unknown, probably not older than the early Pliocene		Indian Ocean (Diamantina Zone seafloor)	A beaked whale.	
Quasibalaena	Gen. et sp. nov		Bisconti & Bosselaers	Pliocene	Kattendijk Formation	Belgium	A member of the family Balaenidae. The type species is Q. portisantuerpiae.	
Scaphokogia huachafo	Sp. nov		Benites-Palomino et al.	Miocene	Pisco Formation	Peru	A member of the family Kogiidae.	

===== Cetacean research =====
- Peacock & Thewissen (2026) compare volume measurements of the bony labyrinth in extant mammals and Eocene cetaceans, and hypothesize that fossil cetaceans had membranous ducts of relatively larger size compared to terrestrial even-toed ungulates, and that vestibular organs of early cetaceans were necessary for terrestrial locomotion.
- Buono et al. (2026) reconstruct changes of cetacean morphological diversity and ecospace occupancy throughout the evolutionary history of the group, identifying Eocene–Oligocene and Plio–Pleistocene transitions as periods of major evolutionary changes, and linking changes of ecospace occupancy to the main radiation events of the group.
- Delsett et al. (2026) reconstruct swimming modes of five Eocene and Oligocene cetaceans on the basis of the study of their inner vertebral microanatomy.
- Pyenson, Uhen & Peredo (2026) determine the distribution of lateral palatal foramina in cetaceans and related mammals on the basis of reevaluation of datasets from the studies of Peredo, Pyenson & Uhen (2022) and Ekdale et al. (2024) as well as on the basis of the fossil record, and argue that lateral palatal foramina counts are not a reliable indicator of presence of baleen in extinct whales.
- Tyborowski et al. (2026) report the discovery of a portion of a dentary of an indeterminate member of Pelagiceti from the Siemień Formation, representing the first record of an Eocene whale from Poland and one of the smallest fully aquatic Eocene whales reported to date.
- A deciduous tooth of a basilosaurid with evidence of malformation that might have been caused by localized stress is described from the Eocene Submeseta Formation (Seymour Island, Antarctica) by Bajor et al. (2026).
- A basilosaurid tooth representing the first record a member of this family from the Eocene strata from northern Eurasia is reported from the Sverdlovsk Oblast (Russia) by Tarasenko, Malyshkina & Sinitsa (2026).
- Hakkens, Reumer & Schulp (2026) study the affinities of the basilosaurid specimen TM 8501 from the Eocene (Priabonian) Yazoo Clay (Alabama, United States; the holotype of Zeuglodon hydrarchus), identify the studied individual as a mid-sized cetacean distinct from Dorudon serratus and Chrysocetus healyorum, an tentatively refer the specimen to Zygorhiza kochii.
- Marx et al. (2026) describe previously unpublished fossil material of Saghacetus osiris and Basilosaurus cf. isis from the Eocene strata from Al-Fayoum (Egypt), and report probable evidence of death of the studied specimen of S. osiris from an attack of Basilosaurus.
- Davydenko et al. (2026) report fossil evidence from the Pyvykha Mountain site (Ukraine) indicative of coexistence of archaeocetes of at least two different body size categories in the same locality during the middle Eocene, and interpret the studied cetaceans as likely to be close relatives of the ancestors of Neoceti.
- Van Rompaey et al. (2026) describe fossil material of Brevirostrodelphis aff. dividum and Brevirostrodelphis sp. from the Berchem Formation (Belgium), providing evidence of presence of members of this genus in the North Sea Basin and their trans-Atlantic distribution during the Miocene, and reinterpret the type specimen of Phocaenopsis sheynensis as a specimen of Kentriodon sp.
- Fossil material of a member of the genus Orcinus comparable in size to large orca males, representing the largest Pleistocene delphinid reported to date and preserving evidence of adaptations to macroraptorial feeding, is described from the strata of the Westkapelle Ground Formation from offshore localities in southern North Sea by Bakker et al. (2026).
- The first porpoise fossil material from the western North Atlantic is reported from the Pliocene strata near Charleston (South Carolina, United States) by Kofranek et al. (2026).
- Tanaka et al. (2026) report the first discovery of fossil material of a toothed whale from the Miocene (Burdigalian to Langhian) strata of the Korematsu Formation (Japan).
- Buchholtz et al. (2026) report evidence of links between sternal shape and feeding behaviors in extant baleen whales, and reconstruct the transition from raptorial predation to filter feeding during the evolutionary history of baleen whales on the basis of the study of sternal morphology in extinct members of the group.
- Strauch & Pyenson (2026) report the discovery of fossil material of cf. Salishicetus from the Oligocene or Miocene strata of the Vaqueros Formation (California, United States).
- Agnolín, Bogan & Lucero (2026) consider Balaena pampaea, Notiocetus romerianus and N. platensis to be nomina dubia, interpreting the fossil material of N. platensis as remains of an indeterminate baleen whale, and interpreting fossils of B. pampaea and N. romerianus as remains of an indeterminate balaenid.
- Lambert et al. (2026) report shark feeding traces on bones of cetacean specimens from the Pliocene Kattendijk Formation (Belgium), including evidence of a bluntnose sixgill shark feeding on a right whale Balaenella brachyrhynus and evidence of Carcharodon plicatilis feeding on a member of the genus Casatia.
- López-Galán, Ferrón & Botella (2026) study ecomorphological variation of extant and extinct filter-feeding cetaceans, pachycormiform fishes and selachians, interpreting members of the three groups as repeatedly converging toward analogous functional designs, but also interpreting their convergent evolution as influenced by lineage-specific constraints.

==== Other artiodactyls ====
Name	Novelty	Status	Authors	Age	Type locality	Country	Notes	Images
Afromerycops	Gen. et sp. nov	Valid	Pickford, AbdelGawad & Al-Riaydh	Miocene		Libya	An anthracothere. Genus includes new species A. libycus.	
Bison constantini	Sp. nov	Valid	Vislobokova, Titov & Yarmolchyk	Pleistocene		Crimea	A bison.	
Carinameryx	Gen. et sp. nov		Gentry et al.	Miocene		Pakistan	A member of the family Bovidae belonging to the subfamily Bovinae and the tribe Boselaphini. The type species is C. lindsayi.	
Chinjikeros	Gen. et sp. nov		Gentry et al.	Miocene		Pakistan	A member of the family Bovidae belonging to the subfamily Antilopinae. The type species is C. kanatti.	
Garobunodon	Gen. et comb. nov	Valid	Pickford	Miocene		India; Pakistan	An anthracothere. Genus includes "Anthracotherium" silistrense Pentland (1828), "Anthracotherium" punjabiense Lydekker (1877) and "Anthracotherium" exiguum Forster-Cooper (1924).	
Homocamelus kellyi	Sp. nov	Valid	Prothero et al.	Miocene (Barstovian)	Valentine Formation	United States (Nebraska)	A member of the family Camelidae belonging to the subfamily Miolabinae.	
Honeycamelus	Gen. et comb. nov	Valid	Prothero et al.	Miocene (Hemingfordian)	Sheep Creek Formation	United States (Nebraska)	A member of the family Camelidae related to members of Camelini and Lamini. The type species is "Alticamelus" priscus Matthew (1924).	
Leptobos etruscus flerovi	Ssp. nov	Valid	Vislobokova, Titov & Yarmolchyk	Pleistocene		Crimea	A bovid. Published online in 2026, but the issue date is listed as December 2025.	
Libycomeryx	Gen. et sp. nov	Valid	Pickford, AbdelGawad & Al-Riaydh	Miocene		Libya	An anthracothere. Genus includes new species L. sirtensis.	
Longirostrotylopus	Gen. et sp. nov	Valid	Prothero et al.	Oligocene and Miocene (Arikareean to Hemingfordian)	John Day Formation	United States (Oregon)	A member of the family Camelidae belonging to the subfamily Floridatragulinae. The type species is L. holroydae.	
Loxomeryx	Gen. et comb. nov	Valid	Fu et al.	Miocene	Dongxiang Formation	China	A lagomerycine stem-cervid; a new genus for "Stephanocemas" guangheensis Deng et al. (2014).	
Maradameryx	Gen. et comb. nov	Valid	Pickford, AbdelGawad & Al-Riaydh	Miocene		Libya	An anthracothere. Genus includes "Merycopotamus" maradensis Gaziry (1987).	
Merycops wahatensis	Sp. nov	Valid	Pickford, AbdelGawad & Al-Riaydh	Miocene		Libya	An anthracothere.	
Paratoceras friedmanae	Sp. nov		Jiménez-Hidalgo & Carbot-Chanona in Jiménez-Hidalgo, Carbot-Chanona & Gómez-Pérez	Miocene	Mazantic Shale	Mexico	A member of the family Protoceratidae.	
Procamelus webbi	Sp. nov	Valid	Prothero et al.	Miocene (Hemphillian)	Snake Creek Formation	United States (Nebraska; Oklahoma)	A member of the family Camelidae belonging to the tribe Camelini.	
Procervulus mizunami	Sp. nov	Valid	Nishioka & Ando	Miocene	Akeyo Formation	Japan	A stem-cervid.	
Prolibycosaurus	Gen. et sp. nov	Valid	Pickford, AbdelGawad & Al-Riaydh	Miocene		Egypt	An anthracothere. Genus includes new species P. qattaraensis.	
Punjabameryx	Gen. et sp. nov		Gentry et al.	Miocene		Pakistan	A member of the family Bovidae belonging to the subfamily Bovinae and the tribe Boselaphini. The type species is P. inflata.	
Rectacornis	Gen. et sp. nov		Gentry et al.	Miocene		Pakistan	A member of the family Bovidae possibly belonging to the subfamily Bovinae. The type species is R. mirabilis.	
Sivaceros antecedens	Sp. nov		Gentry et al.	Miocene		Pakistan	A member of the family Bovidae belonging to the subfamily Bovinae and the tribe Boselaphini.	
Spiraliscornis	Gen. et sp. nov		Gentry et al.	Miocene		Pakistan	A member of the family Bovidae, possibly a large spiral-horned member of the subfamily Antilopinae and the tribe Antilopini. The type species is S. inopinata.	
Strepsiportax meyeri	Sp. nov		Gentry et al.	Miocene		Pakistan	A member of the family Bovidae belonging to the subfamily Bovinae and the tribe Boselaphini.	
Syncerus ekosowan	Sp. nov	Valid	Bibi & Boisserie	Pliocene-Pleistocene transition	Shungura Formation	Ethiopia	A buffalo, a species of Syncerus.	
Urmiatherium cheni	Sp. nov		Shi & Qiu	Miocene		China	A member of the family Bovidae.	
Vampyrocamelus	Gen. et sp. nov	Valid	Marriott et al.	Miocene (Clarendonian)	Clarendon Beds	United States (Nebraska; Oklahoma; Texas)	A member of the family Camelidae belonging to the tribe Lamini. The type species is V. welshi.	

===== Other artiodactyl research =====
- Taxonomic revision and a study on biostratigraphy of oreodonts from the John Day region of Oregon (United States) is published by Emery-Wetherell, Famoso & Samuels (2026).
- Emery-Wetherell, Famoso & Samuels (2026) revise purported diagnostic characters of oreodont species from the John Day region, and argue that there is no conclusive evidence of presence of more than one species of eporeodontine (Eporeodon occidentalis) and promerycochoerine (Promerycochoerus superbus) in the studied area.
- Review of the fossil record and evolutionary history of South American camelids is published by Castillo, Corti & Samaniego (2026).
- Evidence of stability of the morphology locomotor traits in the astragali of camelids and antilocaprids from the Dove Spring Formation in spite of environmental changes in the Miocene is presented by Hardy & Kort (2026).
- Arranz et al. (2026) revise the composition of the Miocene (Vallesian) suid assemblage from the Can Llobateres 1 locality (Vallès-Penedès Basin, Spain).
- Siarabi et al. (2026) describe new fossil material of Propotamochoerus palaeochoerus from the Miocene strata from els Hostalets de Pierola (Spain), study the phylogenetic relationships of this species, and determine the first appearance of P. palaeochoerus in the Vallès-Penedès Basin to predate the earliest record of hipparionins by approximately 50,000 years.
- The best preserved skull of a male specimen of Sus lydekkeri reported to date is described from the Pleistocene strata from the Jinyuan Cave (Liaoning, China) by Dong et al. (2026), who also report evidence of overlap of intraspecific variation of Sus lydekkeri, Sus peii, Sus strozzi and the wild boar.
- A study on the phylogenetic relationships of extant and extinct ruminants, and on the impact of increased fossil taxon sampling on the results of analyses of timing of ruminant evolution, is published by Till & Smith (2026).
- Evidence of presence of fossil material of seven ruminant taxa at the Pliocene site of Jradzor (Armenia) is presented by Bukhsianidze (2026).
- Hartung & Böhme (2026) study changes in the skull of Dorcatherium naui during its ontogeny, interpreted as suggestive of similarities of life history characteristics of the studied tragulid and extant water chevrotain.
- A study on the composition of the late Middle Miocene tragulid assemblage from the Chinji Formation (Pakistan) and on the ecology of the studied tragulids is published by Nawaz et al. (2026).
- Piprek, Rams-Pociecha & Mizia (2026) consider evidence from the study of extant and extinct pecoran ruminants to be insufficient to definitively resolve the question whether the cranial appendages share a common evolutionary origin or whether they evolved independently in multiple pecoran lineages.
- A study on tooth enamel histology of Eotragus noyei and Procervulus cf. dichotomus from the Miocene site of els Casots (Vallès-Penedès Basin, Spain), providing probable evidence of fast life histories of the studied ungulates, is published by Cuccu et al. (2026).
- Magoulick & Marshall (2026) interpret lack of dispersal of pronghorns into South America during the Great American Interchange as most likely linked to lack to suitable climatic conditions in potential dispersal corridors.
- A study on the limb bone histology and life history of Ampelomeryx ginsburgi is published by Viladot et al. (2026).
- Quaranta et al. (2026) reconstruct the biogeographical history of giraffids on the basis of the Miocene to Holocene fossil record.
- Al Riaydh et al. (2026) study the assemblage of giraffid astragali from upper Miocene-Pliocene As-Sahabi deposits (Libya), and identify fossil material of two species of Samotherium (S. major and S. boissieri) that likely differed in habitat preferences.
- Zhang et al. (2026) describe new fossil material of Palaeotragus from the Miocene strata from the Linxia Basin (Gansu, China), providing new information on the morphological variability of the Chinese members of the genus, and interpret features that purportedly distinguished P. microdon from P. cf. coelophrys as not taxonomically stable.
- Tsatsalis & van der Geer (2026) reconstruct life histories of Pleistocene Axis lydekkeri and Duboisia santeng from Java (Indonesia), reporting evidence of high juvenile mortality and evidence of survival after senescence.
- Evidence from the study of the isotopic composition of tooth enamel of deer and Alpine ibex from the Melitzia Cave (Greece), indicative of presence of a Late Pleistocene refugium in the Mani Peninsula, is presented by Tzortzi et al. (2026).
- Evidence of a flexible dietary niche of reindeer living in Europe from Marine Isotope Stage 5a to Marine Isotope Stage 2 is presented by Hemmingham, Pappa & Schreve (2026).
- Liu, Li & Ni (2026) identify late Pleistocene reindeer fossil material found near Harbin (China) with similarities to the barren-ground ecotype, and argue that its presence in the area with a forest-steppe or closed woodland environment during the Pleistocene might have been linked to their displacement from tundra by humans.
- New fossil material of Sinomegaceros ordosianus, providing new information on the morphology of members of this species, is described from the Pleistocene strata from the Yitong River basin (China) by Zhang & Wang (2026).
- Rocha-Méndez et al. (2026) report evidence from the study of mitochondrial genomes of European fallow deers from the Neumark-Nord sites (Germany) indicative of loss of genetic diversity of the species since the Pleistocene, recovering the studied extinct population from a single Eemian locality with as much genetic diversity as seen in extant population with a Eurasian range.
- Chung & Cho (2026) describe new antler remains of Elaphurus formosanus from the Pleistocene of Taiwan and support recognition of the species as distinct.
- Amanova, Drucker & Fontana (2026) reconstruct the ecology and habitat use of red deers from the Epigravettian sequence of Riparo Tagliente (Italy) on the basis of the study of carbon and oxygen isotopic composition of their tooth enamel, reporting evidence of a diet based on C_{3} plants and life in the landscape dominated by open woodland environments.
- Kubo, Yamazaki & Taniguchi (2026) reconstruct the diet of early to mid-Holocene sika deers from the Iyai Rockshelter Site (Japan) on the basis of the study on their tooth wear texture, reporting evidence of abrasive food in their diets and short-term temporal changes in foraging conditions.
- Martínez-Polanco (2026) determines diet of extant Neotropical deer (including local dietary variation within species) on the basis of the study of their tooth wear, providing reference data that can be used to determine diets of fossil deer and other small- to medium-sized ungulates.
- Chen, Li & Shi (2026) study the cranial morphology and phylogenetic affinities of Tossunnoria pseudibex, recover the species as a member of the bovid tribe Urmiatheriini, and interpret its caprin-like morphology as a result of convergent evolution.
- Revision of the type material of Pachygazella grangeri is published by Bai, Wang & Dong (2026).
- Abbas et al. (2026) describe new fossil material of "Gazella" gaudryi from the Miocene Linxia Basin (China), and assign both this species and "Gazella" paotehensis to the genus Vetagazella (elevated from the rank of the subgenus).
- Evidence from the study of tooth wear of extant and Pleistocene springboks, indicative of variability of dietary signals in members of the same species both within and across different biomes, is presented by Walls et al. (2026).
- Xiao et al. (2026) reconstruct the evolutionary history of members of the genus Procapra on the basis from genomic data from modern specimens and from fossils, and identify purported Late Pleistocene specimens of Przewalski's gazelle from northeastern China as more closely related to the Mongolian gazelle.
- Dumitru et al. (2026) determine that deposition of fossils of Myotragus antiquus in Cova des Fum (Mallorca, Spain) happened between 3.60 and 3.45 million years ago, indicating that M. antiquus lived years earlier than indicated by previous estimates.
- Armaroli et al. (2026) provide new information on the late Pleistocene Alpine ibex population from Riparo Dalmeri (Italy) on the basis of the study of strontium, carbon and oxygen isotopic composition of their remains, ancient DNA data and radiocarbon dating, reporting evidence of stable density of the studied population despite intensive hunting and consistent human presence, as well as evidence dietary differences between sexes in the studied population.
- Sorbelli et al. (2026) describe fossil material of "Alephis" tigneresi from the Pliocene strata from Camp dels Ninots (Spain), and assign this species to the genus Parabos.
- Liang et al. (2026) study the phylogenetic relationships of Bubalus mephistopheles and Bubalus wansjocki on the basis of data from mitochondrial genomes, and argue that the studied water buffaloes might represent the same species and be a part of the sister group of extant anoa.
- Oppenheimer et al. (2026) reconstruct the population history of the American bison on the basis of data from modern and ancient individual living within the last 20,000 years.
- Oppenheimer et al. (2026) sequence nuclear genomes of Pleistocene bovines from the Denisova Cave belonging to the lineage sister to extant yaks that was identified by Gilardet et al. (2025), and interpret this lineage as a previously unrecognized extinct bovine species that started diverging from the extant yak lineage around 400,000 years ago.
- Al Riaydh, Merceron & Lehmann (2026) determine the taxonomic composition of the assmeblage of bovid astragali and phalanx bones from the Miocene-Pliocene site of As-Sahabi (Libya), interpreted as indicative of predominantly open environments that also included lightly wooded and forested areas.
- Kelly & Alemseged (2026) interpret the morphology of the astragali of bovids from Member G of the Shungura Formation (Ethiopia) as indicative of presence of taxa adapted to environments with varying vegetation cover, and interpret their findings as indicative of short-term fluctuations in environmental conditions.
- Kelly, Slater & Alemseged (2026) report evidence of utility of Bayesian ordinal modeling for the studies of ecomorphology of bovids based on data from their astragali.
- Evidence of preservation of ancient DNA in Pleistocene bovid remains from South Africa that are between approximately 50,000 and 12,000 years old is presented by de Jager et al. (2026).
- Evidence from dental microwear texture analysis, indicating that members of the genus Archaeotherium representing different morphotypes and size classes occupied different dietary niches, is presented by Wooten & DeSantis (2026).
- Ducrocq et al. (2026) describe new fossil material of Anthracokeryx naduongensis, Bothriogenys vietnamensis and B. langsonensis from the Eocene strata from the Na Duong coal mine (Vietnam), and emend the diagnoses of the studied species.
- Scribano et al. (2026) compare the postcranial anatomy of Libycosaurus bahri and Hexaprotodon garyam from the Miocene strata from Toros-Menalla (Chad), and establish an anatomical framework for the identification of postcranial remains of anthracotheres and hippopotamids.
- A study on tooth anomalies in specimens of Hippopotamus cf. gorgops from the Olduvai Gorge (Tanzania), interpreted as consistent with traumatic displacement likely linked to aggressive interactions and with reactions to seasonal environmental fluctuations, is published by Fidalgo et al. (2026).
- Martino et al. (2026) study the cranial phenotypic diversity of hippopotamid material from Ortona (Italy) and related specimens from the Pleistocene of Central and Western Europe, identifying two morphotypes of Hippopotamus antiquus and reporting evidence of significant sexual dimorphism in mandibles of specimens from Maglianella (Italy).
- Evidence of seasonal dietary variability of Early–Middle Pleistocene Hippopotamus antiquus from the Megalopolis Basin (Greece) is provided by Roditi et al. (2026).
- Marra (2026) studies morphological variation of Pleistocene hippopotamids from Sicily and Malta, and finds no evidence of presence of additional hippopotamid taxa besides Hippopotamus pentlandi in Sicily.
- Radović et al. (2026) identify fossil material of a hippopotamus or a related taxon from the Grebci karst area (Bosnia and Herzegovina), representing the first confirmed finding of a member of the genus Hippopotamus in southeastern Europe outside Greece.
- Martino, Di Patti & Pandolfi (2026) revise the postcranial remains of hippopotamids from the San Ciro Cave (Sicily, Italy), providing evidence of presence of at least two species with different environmental adaptations (Hippopotamus pentlandi and the hippopotamus).
- Evidence of grazing-oriented diet in Hippopotamus pentlandi is presented by Martino et al. (2026).
- Gerakakis et al. (2026) describe new fossil material of Hippopotamus creutzburgi from the Katharo Plateau (Crete, Greece), providing evidence of anatomical differences between its skull and the skull of its mainland relatives other that smaller size, as well as evidence of sexual dimorphism in the mandible.

=== Carnivorans ===
Name	Novelty	Status	Authors	Age	Type locality	Country	Notes	Images
Archaeomeles	Gen. et sp. nov	Valid	Kargopoulos et al.	Miocene		Greece	A member of the family Mustelidae belonging to the stem group of Melinae. Genus includes new species A. neglecta.	
Cryptoprocta bevatabe	Sp. nov		Lewis et al.	Holocene		Madagascar	A member of the family Eupleridae.	
Dehmictis musili	Sp. nov	Valid	Siliceo et al.	Miocene		Czech Republic	A member of the family Mustelidae.	
Dinocrocuta yingliangi	Sp. nov		Jiangzuo et al.	Miocene		China	A member of the family Hyaenidae.	
Galanthisictis	Gen. et sp. nov	Valid	Valenciano et al.	Miocene		Spain	A weasel-like mustelid. The type species is G. baskini.	
Mellivora indosinica	Sp. nov		Lopatin & Gimranov	Pleistocene		Vietnam	A species of Mellivora.	
Nyctereutes urartuensis	Sp. nov	Valid	Bartolini-Lucenti et al.	Pliocene		Armenia	A species of Nyctereutes.	
Otaria josefinae	Sp. nov		Hostos-Olivera et al.	Pliocene-Pleistocene		Peru	A sea lion.	
Paludocyon moyasolai	Sp. nov	Valid	Morales et al.	Miocene		Spain	A member of the family Amphicyonidae.	
Panthera pardus burgtonnae	Ssp. nov	Valid	Hemmer & Kahlke	Pleistocene		Germany	A subspecies of the leopard.	
Promegaviverra	Gen. et sp. nov	Valid	Valenciano, Beech & Bellucci	Miocene	Baynunah Formation	United Arab Emirates	A member of the family Viverridae. The type species is P. abudhabiensis.	
Zdanskyictis	Gen. et comb. nov	Valid	Valenciano et al.	Miocene		China	A mustelid related to the subfamilies Lutrinae and Ictonychinae; a new genus for "Proputorius" minimus Zdansky (1924).	

==== Carnivoran research ====
- Evidence of impact of competition on diversification of North American and Eurasian carnivorans throughout the last 45 million years is presented by Porto & Quental (2026).
- A study on the mandibles of extant and extinct carnivorans, providing evidence of overall decoupling of evolution of mandible shape and function, but also possible evidence of modular dynamics in the evolution of mandible, with differences in the pace and correlation of evolution of different anatomical regions, is published by Sansalone et al. (2026).
- Bartolini-Lucenti et al. (2026) document new occurrences of carnivorans in the Pliocene strata from the Jradzor locality (Armenia), including Baranogale helbingi, Chasmaporthetes lunensis, Pliocrocuta perrieri and cf. Lynx sp., expanding known geographic and temporal ranges of the studied carnivorans.
- Orcutt et al. (2026) report the discovery of new carnivoran fossil material from the John Day Formation (Oregon, United States), including the first definitive records of Osbornodon sp. and Otarocyon sp. from the studied formation, as well as a possible fossil material of a large amphicyonine.
- Espinasa et al. (2026) study the composition of the Rancholabrean carnivoran assemblage from the Calera cave system (San Luis Potosí, Mexico), including a growth sequence of Smilodon fatalis.
- Díaz de León-Muñoz, Siliceo & Ferreira (2026) study the feeding behavior of Magericyon anceps, reporting evidence of resistance of its mandible to loads during hunting, but also evidence of an unexpectedly weak bite.
- Evidence from the study of extant and extinct canids interpreted as supporting Bergmann's rule in the studied group at the interspecific level is presented by Chaves-Silveira et al. (2026).
- Evidence from the study of the fossil record of canids from the John Day Formation, indicative of stronger links of dietary behavior of the studied canids (as indicated by tooth wear) with lineage duration than with tooth morphology, is presented by Tanis, DeSantis & Terry (2026).
- Kort, Cavin & Wang (2026) describe the anatomy of the postcranial skeleton of Mesocyon coryphaeus, finding no evidence of cursorial adaptations seen in later canids, and interpret the studied canid as a likely ambush predator.
- Kropczyk & Marciszak (2026) report the discovery of fossil material of the corsac fox from the late Pleistocene strata from the Rogóżka Cave (Poland).
- Fossil material of Xenocyon lycaonoides representing one of the earliest records of this species worldwide is described from the early Pleistocene strata from the Gonghe Basin (Tibetan Plateau; China) by Huang et al. (2026).
- Frosali et al. (2026) interpret the shape and size of the frontal sinus in Canis etruscus, Canis mosbachensis and Canis borjgali as primarily influenced by the ecology of the studied canids, and interpret the morphology of the frontal sinus of the latter two species as indicative of higher proportion of meat in their diets compared to C. etruscus.
- Lyubimov, Sablin & Sedikhin (2026) identify canid fossil material from the Pleistocene strata from the Muhkai 2 locality (Dagestan, Russia) representing the first record of Canis etruscus in the Caucasus, while Lyubimov & Sablin (2026) report pathological modifications in a mandible of Canis etruscus from the Muhkai 2 locality identified as a fully healed displaced mandibular fracture, and interpret the survival of the studied individual as a likely evidence of sociality and conspecific care in C. etruscus.
- Peri et al. (2026) determine the reaction stress of skulls of Canis borjgali and C. mosbachensis in different bite scenarios, and interpret the former taxon as more likely to be able to process hard food than the latter one.
- Blázquez-Orta et al. (2026) study the fossil material of Early and Middle Pleistocene canids from the Atapuerca Mountains (Spain), interpret the morphology of the studied fossils as consistent with a gradual transition from Canis mosbachensis to the wolf, and determine the observed morphological changes to coincide with a climatic shift.
- Evidence from the study of tooth wear in late Pleistocene wolves from Britain, indicative of dietary shifts related to climate and environmental changes, is presented by Burtt et al. (2026).
- Micucci et al. (2026) compare the lengths and widths of carnassial teeth and overall body mass of Pleistocene grey wolves from eastern Beringia and recent Canadian individuals, find no evidence of significant body size differences between Pleistocene Yukon wolves and modern Canadian ones when accounting for sample size differences, and interpret Pleistocene Yukon wolves and modern Canadian wolves as belonging to the same ecotype, different from larger Pleistocene wolves from Alaska and Siberia.
- Evidence from the study of nuclear and mitochondrial genomes Paleolithic dog remains, indicative of presence and wide distribution of a genetically homogeneous dog population across Europe and Anatolia by at least 14,300 years ago, is presented by Marsh et al. (2026).
- Bergström et al. (2026) reconstruct the evolutionary history of early European dogs on the basis of the study of ancient DNA from Paleolithic and Mesolithic remains, reporting evidence of genetic diversification of European dogs before 14,200 years ago, and evidence of contribution of Mesolithic dogs to the ancestry of later, Neolithic European dogs.
- Kropczyk & Marciszak (2026) study the composition of the canid assemblage from caves from Mount Połom (Poland), including Pleistocene wolves that are morphologically comparable with extant wolves and only slightly smaller, representing one of the oldest large-bodied wolves in Europe reported to date.
- Purported partial dentary of a member of the genus Plionarctos from the Miocene Rattlesnake Formation (Oregon, United States) is considered to be only identifiable as belonging to an indeterminate bear by Schubert & Samuels (2026), who consider Plionarctos edensis from the latest Hemphillian Mt. Eden Local Fauna from California to be oldest known confirmed short-faced bear.
- Ruiz-Ramoni et al. (2026) identify fossil material of a specimen of Arctotherium wingei from Taima-Taima (Venezuela), find A. wingei to be the only species of Arctotherium present in the region, and review the fossil record of bears in Venezuela.
- Lopatin et al. (2026) describe molars of Helarctos malayanus praemalayanus from the Pleistocene strata of the Tham Hai Cave (Vietnam), and interpret the fossil record from Southeast Asia as indicative of larger body size of Middle Pleistocene sun bears compared to their extant relatives.
- Probable fossil material of the Asian black bear, representing the first known record of a member of this lineage from northeastern Iberian Peninsula, is described from the Middle Pleistocene strata from Llers Quarry (Spain) by Rufí et al. (2026).
- Gutiérrez-Carbajal et al. (2026) reconstruct the evolutionary history of cave bears from southwestern Europe on the basis of data from enamel proteomic analysis, recovering Ursus dolinensis as a basal member of the cave bear lineage.
- Kochnev et al. (2026) study the variation of the size and shape of the hard palate and choanae of Ursus kanivetz and Ursus rossicus, and report possible evidence of a link between the hard palate form and the climate.
- A study on the ecology of cave bears from Galería 1 inside the Cueva de Guantes (Palencia, Spain) as indicated by isotopic composition of tooth enamel and bone collagen is published by Rodríguez-Franco et al. (2026).
- Plichta et al. (2026) provide new information on the development of cave bears during the first years of their life on the basis of the study of cub remains from the Barová Cave (Czech Republic) and Goyet Caves (Belgium), reporting evidence of quicker skeletal development during early life in cave bears compared to brown bears.
- Hasegawa et al. (2026) study the distribution of brown bears in the Japanese Archipelago during the Late Pleistocene, reporting remains of exceptionally large individuals from Aomori, Nagano, Shizuoka and Oita.
- Estraviz-López et al. (2026) study the fossil record of Pleistocene brown bears from Portugal, reporting evidence of presence of robust individuals with features convergent with cave bears and some of the largest brown bears in the fossil record reported to date, as well as evidence of size reduction during the Holocene that might have been linked to human pressure and habitat destruction.
- Evidence from the study of mandibles of Pleistocene and Holocene browns bears, indicative of differences of masticatory adaptations of bears from warm and cold areas regardless of their geological age, is presented by van Heteren & Villalba de Alvarado (2026).
- Johnson et al. (2026) report the recovery of ancient DNA from the early Holocene glacial lake sediments in northern Sweden representing the oldest record of brown bear in the region reported to date, and report evidence of affinities of the studied individual with the southern population of Scandinavian brown bears, possibly indicating that the individual migrated northward from its birthplace.
- Evidence of a predominantly herbivorous diet of early Holocene brown bears from the Hattab II and Kehf el-Hammar sites (Morocco) is presented by Iken et al. (2026).
- Description of new fossil material of Trochotherium cyamoides from La Grive-Saint-Alban (France) and Kleineisenbach (Germany) and a study on the anatomy and affinities of members of this species is published by Sánchez-Hernández et al. (2026), who interpret T. cyamoides as a member of the stem group of Mephitidae that might have fed on terrestrial gastropods.
- Evidence from the study of the pelvis and hindlimbs of Cyonasua, indicative of morphological similarities to bones of scansorial and terrestrial generalist carnivorans such as members of the genera Galictis, Meles and Arctictis, is presented by Tarquini et al. (2026).
- Tseng (2026) describes the first known partial skeleton of Leptarctus wortmani from the Hemphillian strata from the Rome Beds (Oregon, United States), providing evidence of morphology of the postcranial skeleton similar to those of extant badgers belonging to the genus Meles.
- Lopatin et al. (2026) describe a molar of a member of the genus Mellivora from the Pleistocene strata from the Tham Hai Cave, representing the first known record of Mellivorinae in Southeast Asia.
- A new specimen of Cernictis hesperus, providing new information on the anatomy of members of this species, is described from the (probably late Hemphillian) strata of the Pinole Tuff Formation (California, United States) by Tseng (2026).
- Lopatin et al. (2026) describe fossil material of Pannonictis pliocaenica from the Taurida Cave (Crimea), extending known distribution of the species during the late Villafranchian.
- A well-preserved cranium of a Pleistocene sable is described from the Ogorokha Site (Sakha Republic, Russia) by Boeskorov et al. (2026).
- Sotnikova et al. (2026) report the discovery of new fossil material of large-bodied wolverines from the Pleistocene strata from the Indigirka River basin and New Siberia (Sakha Republic, Russia), and interpret their large size as likely to be physiological adaptation to the mammoth steppe environment.
- Pamfilie & Vitek (2026) report evidence of morphological variability of fossil mandibles of the American mink, and identify a unique morphotype from the Conard Fissure (Arkansas, United States) with higher bite force compared to extant minks.
- Evidence of adaptations for aquatic maneuvering in the forelimbs but not in the hindlimbs of Tyrrhenolutra helbingi is presented by Faggi et al. (2026).
- Rule et al. (2026) study the evolution of amphibious hearing in pinnipeds on the basis of data from extant and extinct representatives of the group and their relatives, link its evolution to the evolution of cavernous tissue in pinniped ear canal and middle ear, and report evidence of presence of amphibious hearing in the last common ancestor of "enaliarctines" and modern pinnipeds but not in more basal members of the pinniped stem group.
- The first pinniped fossil from Taiwan (a femur of a member of the genus Zalophus from the Pleistocene strata from the bottom of the Taiwan Strait) is described by Sun et al. (2026).
- Dewaele et al. (2026) study the long bone variability of extant earless seals, finding no evidence of consistently clear genus- or species-specific shapes, and note the need for reevaluation of validity of fossil taxa described on the basis of isolated long bones.
- Postcranial earless seal bones with distinctive morphology are reported from the Miocene strata from Hrytsiv (Ukraine; the type locality of Planopusa semenovi) by Otriazhyi et al. (2026).
- Dewaele (2026) revises the fossil record of earless seals from the Miocene strata of the Chesapeake Group (Maryland and Virginia, United States), reporting evidence of presence of three seal morphotypes in the studied fossil material.
- Valenzuela-Toro et al. (2026) redescribe the holotype of Kawas benegasorum, report evidence of presence of both monachine- and phocine-like traits, and reports evidence from the study of the stomach contents indicative of a diet that predominantly included fish.
- A study on the relationship between morphology and ecology of extant and extinct members of Feliformia is published by Barrett & Hopkins (2026), who identify three adaptive zones within the studied group, and find that hypercarnivorous feliforms, unlike members of the group with broader diets, can be reliably identified on the basis of the study of their dental morphology.
- Kargopoulos et al. (2026) revise the composition of the ictitheriine hyaenid assemblage from the Miocene strata from the Venta del Moro (Spain), reporting possible evidence of presence of a second species in addition to Hyaenictitherium wongii.
- Kargopoulos et al. (2026) identify bite punctures in skulls of Adcrocuta eximia from the Miocene strata from the Torrentet dels Traginers site and Chasmaporthetes lunensis from the Pleistocene strata from the La Puebla de Valverde site (Spain), interpreted as possible evidence of intraspecific aggression.
- A study on Pliocene coprolites from the Odesa catacombs (Ukraine), providing evidence of extensive bone and hair consumption by members of the genus Pliocrocuta interpreted as indicative of scavenging as primary feeding strategy, is published by Brachaniec et al. (2026).
- Evidence of morphological changes in the skull of Pachycrocuta brevirostris from the Pleistocene strata from the Taurida Cave (Crimea) during its ontogeny is presented by Lavrov et al. (2026).
- Evidence of increased adaptation of postcanine teeth of Pachycrocuta brevirostris to hypercarnivory and bone-cracking throughout the evolutionary history of the species is presented by Khantemirov et al. (2026).
- Courtenay et al. (2026) identify bite marks on a hippopotamus femur from the Pleistocene strata from the Fuente Nueva 3 site (Guadix–Baza Basin; Granada, Spain) as most likely produced by Pachycrocuta brevirostris, and propose a framework that can facilitate the identification of tooth marks of Pachycrocuta.
- Iannucci et al. (2026) report the discovery of fossil material of a hyena belonging to the genus Crocuta from the Pirro III site (Italy), and interpret this finding as indicative of presence of Middle Pleistocene deposits at Pirro Nord.
- Khantemirov et al. (2026) study the morphology of teeth of late Pleistocene cave hyenas from the Tip-Tugai cave (Bashkortostan, Russia), and report differences in teeth morphology between Ural hyenas and most of the European ones which might be evidence of higher degree of adaptation to bone cracking in Ural hyenas.
- Evidence from the study of remains of the spotted hyena from the Pleistocene strata from the San Teodoro Cave (Sicily, Italy), indicative of slightly smaller body size of the spotted hyaenas from Sicily compared to their contemporaries from mainland Europe, is presented by Iurino et al. (2026).
- A nearly complete cranium of Adelphailurus kansensis, providing new information on the skull anatomy of members of this species, is described from the Hemphillian Big Sandy Formation (Arizona, United States) by Chatar & Tseng (2026).
- Salesa et al. (2026) study the functional anatomy of the hindlimbs of Promegantereon ogygia, and report evidence of morphological similarities to hindlimbs of the early felid Proailurus lemanensis.
- Evidence from the study of the neuroanatomy of Megantereon cultridens, interpreted as possibly indicative of scansorial adaptations, enhanced visual processing and preferences for closed environments, is presented by Meli et al. (2026).
- Haji-Sheikh, Haji-Sheikh & Naples (2026) present new cranial endocasts of Smilodon fatalis, and calculate that the range of brain endocast volumes of the studied species overlaps with the published range of brain volumes of modern lions.
- Evidence of utility of CT and MicroCT scans in determining the condition of tooth sockets in skulls of Smilodon fatalis from the La Brea Tar Pits, as well as in determining whether the canines of the studied specimens were correctly associated and correctly seated in tooth sockets during restoration of the skulls, is presented by Haji-Sheikh, Haji-Sheikh & Naples (2026).
- Schmökel, Del Chicca & Hagen Argudin Pina (2026) identify pathologies in three vertebrae of Smilodon fatalis from the La Brea Tar Pits, interpreted as consistent with the diagnosis of a spinal nerve tumor.
- Fernández-Jalvo et al. (2026) identify tooth marks of Smilodon on bones of Toxodon, Notiomastodon, Doedicurus, Glossotherium and Lestodon from the Pleistocene strata from the Salto de Piedra site (Argentina).
- A felid mandible interpreted as the most definitive fossil material of Homotherium latidens from Anatolia reported to date is described from the Burdur Basin (Turkey) by Yavuz et al. (2026).
- Nikolskiy et al. (2026) report the discovery of canines of Homotherium in the late Pleistocene strata from Suruktakh in the Kolyma River basin and from the Bolshoy Lyakhovsky Island (Russia), comfirming presence of members of this genus in northeastern Siberia approximately 41,500–37,500 years ago.
- Reumer, de Vos & Wibowo (2026) interpret Hemimachairodus zwierzyckii from the Pleistocene strata from Sangiran (Java, Indonesia) as a junior synonym of Homotherium latidens.
- Pérez et al. (2026) identify fossil material of lynxes from Serpenteko Leze de Mezkiritz pit (Navarre, Spain) as including remains of both the Iberian lynx and the Eurasian lynx, providing possible evidence of overlap of ranges of both species in northern Iberia around the Pleistocene–Holocene transition.
- Witt, Hotchner & Meachen (2026) report that postcranial remains of Miracinonyx trumani and cougars can be reliably differentiated on the basis of their postcranial remains, and identify fossils of M. trumani from new localities in United States and Mexico.
- Cassatt-Johnstone et al. (2026) determine Miracinonyx trumani to be the sister taxon of the cougar on the basis of data from high-coverage paleogenomes, identify three purported Pleistocene cougar individuals from Yukon (Canada) as individuals of M. trumani instead (extending known geographical range of the species), and report evidence of dietary differences between specimens of M. trumani from Yukon and Wyoming (United States).
- Lyubimov et al. (2026) report the discovery of fossil material of Acinonyx pardinensis from the Muhkai 2 site (Dagestan, Russia), representing the first record of the species in the northeastern Caucasus.
- Hemmer (2026) interprets Pleistocene Feliopsis palaeojavanica from the Trinil site (Indonesia) as a member of a previously unrecognized pantherine lineage that also included Miocene Pachypanthera piriyai, and interprets the studied felids as possible specialized crocodile hunters.
- Jiangzuo et al. (2026) reconstruct the evolutionary history of the tiger lineage throughout its entire temporal range.
- 26 purported subfossil tiger specimens from Japan are reinterpreted as cave lions by Sun et al. (2026), indicating that cave lions were the Panthera lineage that colonized Japan during the Pleistocene.
- Evidence from the study of genomes of cave lions living across a time series spanning over 100,000 years, indicating that cave and modern lions were distinct evolutionary lineages with independent histories, as well as indicative of extensive population connectivity of cave lions and indicative of interbreeding of modern lions (likely from southwestern Asia) with cave lions during the Late Pleistocene, is presented by Stanton et al. (2026).
- Gedman et al. (2026) perform phylogenetic analyses based on paleogenomes generated from ancient DNA found in two specimens of dire wolves and report that the dire wolf lineage diverged from other canids around 4.5 million years ago, prior to the split between the black-backed jackal and other members of the subtribe Canina. Admixture analyses of the dire wolves' paleogenomes indicate hybridization between the lineage that led to the subtribe Cerdocyonina and the sister lineage to gray wolves, coyotes and dholes.

=== Chiropterans ===
Name	Novelty	Status	Authors	Age	Type locality	Country	Notes	Images
Mystacina nymphe	Sp. nov	Valid	Hand et al.	Miocene	Bannockburn Formation	New Zealand	A species of Mystacina.	
Nycticeinops kutchensis	Sp. nov	Valid	Carolin et al.	Miocene (Tortonian)		India	A species of Nycticeinops.	

==== Chiropteran research ====
- Morales et al. (2026) reconstruct the phylogenetic relationships and evolutionary history of bats on the basis of genomic data from extant taxa and from the fossil record, interpreted as indicative of European origin of the group in the Paleocene, as well as indicative of acquisition of laryngeal echolocation before the emergence of the bat crown group.
- Kaźmierkiewicz et al. (2026) reconstruct the evolutionary history of members of the genus Plecotus in Central Europe on the basis of data from ancient DNA from Pleistocene and Holocene fossils, and recover the paratype of Plecotus abeli as identical with extant brown long-eared bats.

=== Eulipotyphlans ===
Name	Novelty	Status	Authors	Age	Type locality	Country	Notes	Images
Mesoscalops irwini	Sp. nov	Valid	Albright et al.	Oligocene	Catahoula Formation	United States (Mississippi)	A member of Talpoidea belonging to the family Proscalopidae.	

==== Eulipotyphlan research ====
- Valenzuela et al. (2026) study the evolution of the postcranial skeleton in the lineage of Nesiotites from the Pliocene to the Holocene, reporting that members of the studied lineage underwent a size shift throughout their evolutionary history but retained adaptations to terrestrial generalist locomotion.
- A study on the composition and evolution of Miocene erinaceid assemblages from the Daroca-Calamocha area (Spain) is published by Cailleux et al. (2026).
- Cailleux (2026) identifies common dental pathologies in the fossil material of Galerix stehlini from the Miocene strata from La Grive-Saint-Alban (France), and interprets their recurrence as possibly linked to small population size linked to habitat fragmentation.

=== Perissodactyls ===
Name	Novelty	Status	Authors	Age	Type locality	Country	Notes	Images
Allacerops ningdongica	Sp. nov		Lu et al.	Oligocene	Qingshuiying Formation	China		
Scythicorhinus	Gen. et comb. nov	Valid	Kovalchuk et al.	Pliocene	Kvabebi fossil site	Crimea; Georgia	A rhinoceros belonging to the tribe Rhinocerotini and the subtribe Dicerorhinina. The type species is "Dicerorhinus" vekuai Tsiskarishvili (1987).	

==== Perissodactyl research ====
- Tissier & Smith (2026) reconstruct the early evolutionary history of Perissodactyla on the basis of a new phylogenetic study, recovering purported horse relatives Hyracotherium and Pliolophus as not belonging to Hippomorpha, and reporting evidence of rapid dispersals of Pliolophus and Cardiolophus in the northern continents around the Paleocene–Eocene thermal maximum.
- New fossil material of Ancylotherium hennigi, providing new information on the anatomy of members of this species, is described from the Plio-Pleistocene strata from Laetoli (Tanzania) by Harrison & Kwekason (2026).
- Radović et al. (2026) identify dental remains of Tapirus arvernensis from the Pliocene strata from the Ridjake fossil site (Serbia).
- Sun et al. (2026) describe new fossil material of Tapirus sanyuanensis from the Pleistocene strata from Renzidong Cave (Anhui, China), providing information on changes in anatomy of members of this species during their ontogeny, as well as evidence of morphological differences between populations of this species from Renzidong Cave and from the Wushan Longgupo Site (Chongqing, China).
- Handa et al. (2026) describe rhinocerotid fossils from the Phra Phut sandpit (Thailand), interpreted as indicative of late Miocene age of the studied assemblage, and report evidence of similarity of composition of the studied assemblage and other late Miocene rhinocerotid assemblages from sandpits in Chaloem Phra Kiat District in Nakhon Ratchasima.
- Sanisidro & Gutiérrez-Marco (2026) describe fossil material of Brachydiceratherium sp. from the Miocene strata of the Santalla Formation (Spain), representing the first large vertebrate from the El Bierzo Basin reported to date.
- A study on deciduous teeth and juvenile skulls of members of the genus Chilotherium, providing evidence of utility of dental characters for species discrimination, is published by Kampouridis et al. (2026).
- Pandolfi, Codrea & Solomon (2026) describe fossil material of a member of the genus Acerorhinus from the Miocene strata from the Crețești 1 site (Romania), with greatest similarity to A. simplex, and refine the species content of the genus Acerorhinus.
- Titov et al. (2026) describe fossil material of Elasmotherium chaprovicum from the Pleistocene strata from the Taurida Cave (Crimea), including the first upper milk teeth of a member of the genus Elasmotherium reported to date.
- Pandolfi et al. (2026) describe a nearly complete skeleton of a small-sized adult specimen of Stephanorhinus etruscus from the Upper Valdarno Basin (Italy) providing new information on the morphological variability of members of this species, including evidence of presence of features previously regarded as typical of Stephanorhinus hundsheimensis or Stephanorhinus jeanvireti.
- Ponomarev et al. (2026) report the discovery of fossil material of Stephanorhinus kirchbergensis in the Pleistocene strata from the Komi Republic (Russia), representing the northernmost record of the species in Europe reported to date.
- Uzunidis & Pandolfi (2026) report evidence of different dynamics of evolution of body mass of the narrow-nosed rhinoceros from Northern Europe and from the Mediterranean, as well as evidence of consistent mixed-feeding strategy in the studied species, with seasonal specialization toward either browsing or grazing in populations near the end of the temporal range of the species.
- Uzunidis, Pandolfi & Brugal (2026) identify fossil material of the narrow-nosed rhinoceros at the Mas des Caves site (France) belonging to at least nine individuals from different size classes, and report evidence of similar plant selection by individuals of different age.
- Guðjónsdóttir et al. (2026) sequence a high-coverage genome from woolly rhinoceros tissue preserved within the stomach of a permafrost-preserved wolf from Tumat (Sakha Republic, Russia) and reconstruct the evolutionary history of the woolly rhinoceros on the basis of genomic data from this and two other Siberian individuals, finding no evidence of genomic erosion or a prolonged reduction in population size before the extinction of the species.
- Lei et al. (2026) reconstruct the population history of the woolly rhinoceros on the basis of data from mitochondrial and nuclear genomes and from habitat modeling, and report evidence of higher genetic diversity in mid-latitude Eurasia compared to regions from high latitudes, as well as evidence of genetic introgression from Stephanorhinus kirchbergensis.
- Evidence from the study of morphology of petrosals and inner ears of fossil horses, indicating that the ear region is informative for the studied of phylogeny of odd-toed ungulates, is presented by Goodchild et al. (2026).
- A study on the evolution of the shape of equid skulls is published by Wisniewski & Slater (2026), who find no evidence of a significant impact of the evolution of hypsodont teeth on facial proportions in Equidae.
- Calderón et al. (2026) present new information on growth and development of teeth of Anchitherium, based on the study of their histology.
- Evidence from the study of tooth enamel of Miocene Anchitherium, indicative of similar life histories of specimens from Germany and Spain ranging from the MN5 to the MN7/8 interval, is presented by Calderón et al. (2026).
- Sanz-Pérez et al. (2026) report evidence from the study of isotopic composition of tooth enamel of Hipparion from Miocene (Vallesian) localities in Duero and Madrid basins (Spain) indicative of intensification of seasonality in central Iberian Peninsula by MN 10 interval, as well as indicative of consumption of C_{3} vegetation by the studied equids and their ecological flexibility.
- Dağ et al. (2026) study the composition of the hipparion assemblage from the Miocene strata from the Yamula Reservoir localities (Turkey), and interpret the studied assemblage as consistent with presence of regionally variable mosaic habitats.
- Shahzad et al. (2026) describe new hipparion fossil material from the Miocene-Pliocene strata from the Gazlope locality (Pakistan), extending known hipparion distribution in the western Sulaiman Range.
- Becker et al. (2026) describe hipparion fossil material from the late Pliocene Jradzor section (Armenia) and transfer "Hipparion" longipes and "H." fissurae to the genus Cremohipparion.
- Evidence indicating that occlusal enamel patterns in cheek teeth of Pleistocene equids from Alaska and Yukon cannot be used to reliably differentiate among tooth morphotypes is presented by Landry et al. (2026).
- Song et al. (2026) determine the affinities of Equus dalianensis on the basis of data from mitochondrial and two nuclear genomes, recovering the studied equid as a member of a lineage within the group of northeast Eurasian wild horse populations, and reporting evidence of contact with eastern Beringian (i.e. American) horses.

=== Other laurasiatherians ===
Name	Novelty	Status	Authors	Age	Type locality	Country	Notes	Images
Dianthusa	Gen. et sp. nov		Gelfo & López	Miocene		Argentina	A member of the family Adianthidae. Genus includes new species D. unlapla.	
Leindacia	Gen. et sp. nov		Gelfo & López	Oligocene		Argentina	A member of the family Indaleciidae. Genus includes new species L. unpasajubo.	
Metapterodon anari	Sp. nov	Valid	Mahmood et al.	Miocene	Nagri Formation	Pakistan	A member of Hyaenodonta belonging to the family Hyainailouridae and the subfamily Hyainailourinae.	
Oligopterna	Gen. et sp. nov		Badin et al.	Oligocene	Fray Bentos Formation	Uruguay	A member of Litopterna the family Proterotheriidae. Genus includes new species O. orientalis.	
Shimenotherium	Gen. et sp. nov	Valid	Xue et al.	Paleocene	Fangou Formation	China	A member of Mesonychia belonging to the family Mesonychidae. Genus includes new species S. jubilatum.	
Simidectes coombsae	Sp. nov	Valid	Zack	Uintan	Friars Formation	United States (California)	A member of Ferae of uncertain affinities.	

==== Miscellaneous laurasiatherian research ====
- A study on the preservation of different kinds of steroids in bones of Ashoroa laticosta, Behemotops katsuiei and an unidentified whale from the Oligocene Morawan Formation (Japan) is published by Umamaheswaran et al. (2026).
- Matsui, Mitoh & Tsubamoto (2026) identify a purported humerus of a member of the genus Behemotops from the Miocene Chikubetsu Formation (Japan) as actually belonging to a juvenile member of the genus Desmostylus, and interpret the specimen as indicating that members of the genus Desmostylus expanded their range across Hokkaido during the Middle Miocene Climatic Optimum.
- Mulcahy (2026) conducts a morphometric analysis of cranial morphology of Uintatherium anceps, and finds no evidence of a strong sexual dimorphism in the species.
- Kramarz & Bond (2026) revise the composition of astrapothere assemblages from the Las Flores Formation (Argentina).
- Evidence of gradual increase of body mass of macraucheniids throughout their evolutionary history, likely linked to climate changes, is presented by Lobo, Gelfo & de Azevedo (2026).
- Wilson et al. (2026) determine that early hypsodont notoungulates from the Oligocene Tinguiririca Fauna (Chile) lived in an open, woody habitat, interpret the tooth wear of the studied notoungulates as consistent with a browsing diet, and interpret the evolution of their hypsodonty as unrelated to the expansion of grasslands.
- Redescription of the anatomy of Puelia plicata is published by Vera, Folino & Scarano (2026).
- A study on the phylogenetic relationships of toxodontid notoungulates is published by Armella & Deforel (2026).
- Armella et al. (2026) make the name of the toxodontid Andinotoxodon bolivarensis, originally described in a doctoral dissertation, available under the International Code of Zoological Nomenclature.
- The first confirmed fossil material of Late Pleistocene Toxodon platensis from the San Luis Province (Argentina), providing information on the intracranial anatomy of members of this species, is described from the Barranquita Formation by Hernández Del Pino et al. (2026).
- Evidence from the study of tooth wear of Tremacyllus and Paedotherium, interpreted as indicating that pachyrukhine hegetotheriid notoungulates were mainly fruit-seed consumers rather than grazers, is presented by Armella & Croft (2026).
- A study on the evolution of the morphological similarity to molar teeth in premolar teeth of ungulates, based on data from extant and extinct artiodactyls and perissodactyls, is published by Ashbaugh, Jamniczky & Theodor (2026).
- Schwartz, DeSantis & Scott (2026) report evidence of extensive dietary overlap of Copecion, Ectocion and Sifrhippus from the Bighorn Basin (Wyoming, United States), and find evidence of only minor changes in tooth microwear of the studied ungulates across the Paleocene–Eocene thermal maximum.
- A study on tooth wear of early Pleistocene ungulates from the Quibas site (Murcia, Spain), interpreted as indicative of a broad spectrum of feeding behaviours consistent with presence of mosaic environments including grasslands with wooded patches, is published by Ramírez-Pedraza, Agustí & Piñero (2026).
- Hussain et al. (2026) reconstruct the dietary presences of Pleistocene ungulates from the Pinjor Formation (Pakistan) on the basis of the study of their tooth wear, interpreted as indicating that the studied assemblage was dominated by grazers but also included browsers and mixed-feeders.
- Abraham et al. (2026) use phylogenetic imputation to reconstruct migratory habits of extinct even- and odd-toed ungulates, and interpret the majority of ungulates that went extinct during the late Quaternary as migratory.
- A study on the composition of the Late Pleistocene carnivoran and ungulate assemblage from the Fusong Xianren Cave (Jilin, China), including common representatives of the Mammuthus-Coelodonta fauna from northeastern China, is published by Liu et al. (2026).
- Rose et al. (2026) provide new information on the forelimb anatomy of Eurotamandua joresi, interpreted as supporting its affinities with Palaeanodonta.
- Evidence from micro-computed tomography of the skeleton of Eurotamandua joresi supporting its affinities with palaeanodonts is presented by Rose et al. (2026).
- Cabasés Bru et al. (2026) study the anatomy of virtual brain endocasts of Metacheiromys marshi, and report evidence that petrosal lobules (controlling eye movements during locomotion) and olfactory bulbs of the studied mammal were larger than in extant pangolins, as well as evidence of presence of well developed orbital gyrus which might be related to the use of a protrusile tongue in mammals specialized in myrmecophagy.
- Chatar et al. (2026) report evidence from the study of tribosphenic carnassial teeth of hyaenodonts and extant and extinct members of Carnivoramorpha indicative of a trade-off during the evolution of vast majority of the studied mammals resulting in prioritization of either shearing or crushing function of the studied teeth, with only minority of predatory mammals evolving optimized dual function of carnassial teeth.
- Kort & Ricker (2026) compare pelvic morphology of Sinopa and Thinocyon with those of extant mammals, and argue that extant carnivorans might be imperfect analogs for reconstructions of configuration of musculature and locomotor modes of hyaenodonts.
- Fischer et al. (2026) study the body mass evolution in European mesonychians, hyaenodonts, oxyaenodonts and carnivoramorphs during the Paleogene, reporting evidence of increase of range of body mass of members of Carnivoramorpha after the Middle Eocene Climatic Optimum (and before the establishment of carnivoran-dominated faunas related to the Grande Coupure), and interpret the replacement of hyaenodont-dominated faunas in Europe by carnivoran-dominated ones as more likely related to climate changes than caused by competition between the different group of mammalian carnivores.

== Xenarthrans ==
=== Cingulatans ===
Name	Novelty	Status	Authors	Age	Type locality	Country	Notes	Images
Glyptotherium deuterophractum	Sp. nov	Valid	Oliveira, Hansen & Porpino	Pleistocene		Brazil; Venezuela		
Nabondasypus	Gen. et sp. nov	Valid	Barasoain et al.	Miocene	Letrero Formation	Ecuador	An armadillo. Genus includes new species N. maddeni.	

==== Cingulatan research ====
- Casali et al. (2026) study the phylogenetic affinities of armadillos and their extinct relatives.
- A study on the endocranial anatomy of pampatheriids and its evolution is published by Troyelli et al. (2026).
- Guzmán-Gutiérrez (2026) report the discovery of fossil material of Pampatherium sp. from the Pleistocene strata from the El Cedazo creek locality, representing the first record of the genus from Aguascalientes (Mexico).
- Redescription of the holotype of Asterostemma barrealense (reinterpreted as an indeterminate member of Propalaehoplophorini) and description of a new glyptodont specimen from the Chinches Formation (San Juan Province, Argentina) assigned to the group Propalaehoplophorini is published by Martini et al. (2026).
- Lagunas-Rodríguez et al. (2026) describe fossil material of Glyptotherium cylindricum from the Pleistocene strata from Puebla (Mexico), and interpret the presence of fossils of G. cylindricum in the Trans-Mexican Volcanic Belt and in the Sierra Madre del Sur within the State of Puebla as likely linked to the location of the corridor used by members of the species to disperse into North America.
- Zamorano, Vezzosi & Mones (2026) describe a caudal tube of Panochthus sp. from the Pleistocene strata (possibly Timbúes Formation) in the Santa Fe Province (Argentina) and reevaluate the validity of Panochthus florensis, considering it to be species inquirenda.
- Quiñones et al. (2026) revise Neuryurus rudis, and interpret its type material as belonging to a juvenile specimen of Panochthus.
- Taxonomic revision of late Pliocene to Middle Pleistocene glyptodonts from central Argentina is published by Zurita et al. (2026).
- Sostillo et al. (2026) provide a systematic review of glyptodonts from the Quaternary strata from eastern and central La Pampa Province (Argentina).
- García, Blanco & Rinderknecht (2026) provide estimates of body mass of Neoglyptatelus uruguayensis.
- A study on the taphonomy of osteoderms of cf. Anadasypus sp. from the Solimões Formation (Brazil), interpreted as indicative of a humid fluvial environment during the Miocene, is published by Pales et al. (2026).
- Corro et al. (2026) revise the type materials of members of the genus Proeutatus from the Santa Cruz Formation (Argentina), and report that the type specimens of the species P. carinatus and P. deleo can be identified with certainty, unlike the type specimens of the species P. oenophorus, P. lagena and P. distans.
- The first specimen of Eutatus seguini preserved with the entirety of the caudal armor is described from the Pleistocene strata from the Laguna Melincué area (Santa Fe Province, Argentina) by Barasoain et al. (2026).
- Barasoain et al. (2026) describe fossil material of the big hairy armadillo from the Pleistocene strata of the La Paz Formation (Bolivia), representing the northernmost record of the species reported to date and the first known fossil evidence of presence of the species in high-altitude environments.

=== Pilosans ===
==== Pilosan research ====
- A xenarthran metacarpal reported from the Eocene La Meseta Formation (Antarctica) is identified as belonging to an indeterminate sloth by Quaggia, Gelfo & Acosta Hospitaleche (2026).
- Casali et al. (2026) identify a poorly developed dental alveolus in a specimen of Nothrotherium maquinense from the Pleistocene strata from Brazil, occupying the position of caniniform alveolus in Neogene nothrotheriids, and interpreted as a possible case of partial re-expression of a lost ancestral dental condition in the studied individual.
- Revision of nematheriine scelidotheriid sloths from the Miocene Santa Cruz Formation (Argentina) is published by Boscaini et al. (2026), who assign all studied fossils to the genus Nematherium, with the majority of them assigned to the species N. angulatum
- New fossil material of Ocnotherium giganteum, including a nearly complete skull and two partial skeletons, is described from the Pleistocene strata from Brazil by Pujos et al. (2026), who recover O. giganteum as a mylodontine mylodontid.
- Evidence from the study of a mylodontid coprolite from the Pleistocene strata from the Cueva Cacao 1.A site (Argentina) indicative of a grazing-browsing dietary niche of the producer is presented by Velázquez et al. (2026).
- Zicos et al. (2026) compare the utility of three ancient DNA extraction methods for recovery of DNA from coprolites of Mylodon darwinii and soil samples from Cueva del Milodón (Chile), and report recovery of both sloth mitochondrial genomes and signatures of local flora.
- Harper et al. (2026) compare the morphology of the femoral neck in members of the genera Acratocnus, Megalocnus, Neocnus and Parocnus with those of extant xenarthrans, and reconstruct the locomotor behaviors of the studied extinct sloths, supporting the interpretation of Parocnus as primarily terrestrial.
- Feola et al. (2026) revise the fossil record of ground sloth footprints, and name new ichnotaxa Megatherichnidae, Falciformichnus and Megatherichnum agilis.

=== General xenarthran research ===
- McDonald et al. (2026) study the composition of the xenarthran assemblage from the Sistema Calera Cave (Mexico), reporting evidence of presence of Glyptotherium cylindricum and three sloth taxa, and report that the studied site represents the second known locality preserving fossil material of both Eremotherium and Nothrotheriops.

== Other eutherians ==
Name	Novelty	Status	Authors	Age	Type locality	Country	Notes	Images
cf. Azilestes yvettae	Sp. nov	Valid	Gheerbrant in Gheerbrant, Allain & Laurent	Late Cretaceous (Maastrichtian)	Marnes d'Auzas Formation	France	A member or a relative of the family Zhelestidae.	
Erlianoryctes	Gen. et sp. nov		Yu et al.	Eocene	Arshanto Formation	China	A member of the family Didymoconidae. Genus includes new species E. mengi.	
Pantolestes densus	Sp. nov	Valid	Qin et al.	Eocene		China	A member of the family Pantolestidae.	
Tamirkhan	Gen. et sp. nov	Valid	Giallombardo et al.	Late Cretaceous	Javkhlant Formation	Mongolia	A member of Zalambdalestoidea with zhelestid-like molars. Genus includes new species T. balcarceli.	

=== Miscellaneous eutherian research ===
- Lopatin & Averianov (2026) report the discovery of a new eutherian petrosal bone from the Lower Cretaceous (Aptian-Albian) strata from the Khovoor locality (Mongolia), and interpret the two eutherian petrosal reported from the Khovoor locality to date as likely belonging to two distinct taxa, possibly Prokennalestes minor and Hovurlestes noyon.
- Description of the endocranial anatomy of Leptictis dakotensis and L. haydeni is published by Van Gent et al. (2026).
- Raynaud et al. (2026) describe fossil material of Coryphodon from the Eocene strata from the Le Quesnoy site (France), compare the diagnostic characters of C. eocaenus, C. anthracoideus and C. oweni, and interpret the latter two species as junior synonyms of C. eocaenus.

== Metatherians ==
Name	Novelty	Status	Authors	Age	Type locality	Country	Notes	Images
Anargyrolagus bargi	Sp. nov	Valid	Abello et al.	Miocene		Argentina	An argyrolagid.	
Archetheridium	Gen. et sp. nov	Valid	Wang & Wang	Early Cretaceous (Barremian–Aptian)	Jiufotang Formation	China	A deltatheroidan. The type species is A. sinense.	
Collonlagus	Gen. et sp. nov	Valid	Abello et al.	Miocene (Colloncuran)		Argentina	An argyrolagid. The type species is C. candelae.	
Europeradectes	Gen. et comb. et 2 sp. nov	Valid	Gernelle in Gernelle, Ladevèze & Tabuce	Eocene		Belgium; France	A member of the family Peradectidae. Genus includes "Peradectes" louisi Crochet (1979), "Peradectes" russelli Crochet (1979), "Armintodelphys" dufraingi Smith & Smith (2013) and "Peradectes" crocheti Gernelle et al. (2024), as well as new species E. marivauxi and E. williamsoni.	
Lelvunlagus	Gen. et comb. nov	Valid	Abello et al.	Miocene-Pliocene? (Huayquerian)	Cerro Azul Formation	Argentina	An argyrolagid. Genus includes "Microtragulus" rusconii Goin, Montalvo & Visconti (2000).	
Lonchotrigonatus	Gen. et sp. nov		Carneiro, Bampi & Silva	Paleogene	Itaboraí Basin	Brazil	A peradectoid metatherian. The type species is L. osvaldoi.	
Miyumba	Gen. et sp. nov	Valid	Churchill et al.	Miocene	Riversleigh World Heritage Area	Australia	A dasyurid. The type species is M. chrisdickmani.	
Nyctodon	Gen. et sp. nov		Carneiro, Bampi & Silva	Paleocene-Eocene	Itaboraí Basin	Brazil	A pucadelphyid. The type species is N. ladevezeae.	
Pampaluctor	Gen. et sp. nov		Del Campo et al.	Pliocene–Pleistocene	Vorohué Formation	Argentina	A member of the family Thylacosmilidae. The type species is P. calibar.	
Phantasmodon	Gen. et 2 sp. nov	Valid	Churchill et al.	Miocene	Riversleigh World Heritage Area	Australia	A marsupial related to Keeuna woodburnei. Genus contains new species P. travouilloni and P. minuferox	
Phascolarctos sulcomaxilliaris	Sp. nov	Valid	Travouillon et al.	Pleistocene		Australia	A species of Phascolarctos.	
Pozodolops	Gen. et sp. nov	Valid	Stutz in Stutz et al.	Paleogene		Peru	A member of Polydolopimorphia belonging to the family Wamradolopidae. The type species is P. manuelorum.	
Sallalagus	Gen. et sp. nov	Valid	Abello et al.	Oligocene		Bolivia	An argyrolagid. The type species is S. forasiepi.	
Wamradolops telloi	Sp. nov	Valid	Stutz in Stutz et al.	Paleogene		Peru	A member of Polydolopimorphia belonging to the family Wamradolopidae.	

=== Metatherian research ===
- Description of the first brain endocast of Lotheridium mengi is published by Bi et al. (2026).
- Probable lower jaw of a member of the genus Leptalestes, belonging to a fully adult and likely senile individual, is described from the strata of the Upper Cretaceous Lance Formation from the Matney Ranch locality (Wyoming, United States) by Gerken et al. (2026).
- Imprint of a manus and pes of a small carnivorous mammal, interpreted as most likely to be a member of Sparassodonta, is described from the Eocene strata of the Fossil Hill Formation (King George Island, Antarctica) by Mansilla-Vera et al. (2026).
- Redescription and a study in the affinities of Eobrasilia coutoi is published by Carneiro et al. (2026).
- Redescription of the skull anatomy of Argyrolagus is published by Forasiepi et al. (2026).
- Probable marsupial tracks with possible evidence of presence of opposable thumbs in the trackmaker are described from the Eocene strata of the Fossil Hill Formation (King George Island, Antarctica) by Souza et al. (2026).
- Carneiro et al. (2026) reinterpret purported paucituberculatan Riolestes capricornicus as a junior synonym of the protodidelphid opossum species Robertbutleria mastodontoidea.
- Rich, Flannery & Vickers-Rich (2026) argue that Cretaceous tribosphenic mammals similar to Ausktribosphenos and Bishops might be ancestral to australidelphians, and that australidelphians and ameridelphians might have separate origins.
- Martin et al. (2026) provide evidence of impact of environmental factors and phylogenetic history on the skull shape diversification in extant and extinct members of Peramelemorphia.
- Gaschk et al. (2026) report evidence of similarities of locomotor biomechanics of extant carnivorous mammals with similar hunting ecology, and find locomotor strategies of the thylacine to be similar to those of extant opportunistic pouncing carnivores.
- Weisbecker et al. (2026) study the cranial morphology and function in the thylacine, and find that the combination of functional traits of skull of members of this species has no analogue among living mammalian carnivores.
- Churchill et al. (2026) identify diagnostic Tasmanian devil specimens from the Juukan 2 Rock Shelter (Pilbara, Western Australia), providing direct evidence of presence of the species in the northwestern Australian mainland during the Late Pleistocene and Holocene, and study chewed and digested bones from the same site accumulated through human activity, interpreted as likely evidence of subsistence of the Tasmanian devils off human activity at the studied site.
- Watts et al. (2026) study the hindlimb morphology of Hadronomas puckridgi, and interpret its foot with a robust fifth digit as representing an intermediate stage in sthenurine evolution, preceding the appearance of astragalar specializations and loss of the fifth digit in later sthenurines.
- Evidence from the study of extant and extinct kangaroos, indicating that giant extinct kangaroos were mechanically capable of hopping but it may not have been their primary locomotor mode, is presented by Jones, Jones & Nudds (2026).
- Couzens, King & Prideaux (2026) report evidence from the study of the fossil record of kangaroos indicative of a progressive increase in tooth enamel thickness in grass-feeding taxa that coincided with expansion of arid habitats in Australia since the late Miocene.
- Koungoulos, Kerr & O'Connor (2026) describe a manual phalanx bone of a member of the genus Protemnodon from the Taora rockshelter (Papua New Guinea), providing evidence of local survival of members of this genus into the middle Holocene.

== Monotremes ==
=== Monotreme research ===
- Flannery et al. (2026) review the fossil record and evolutionary history of monotremes.
- Chimento (2026) reports evidence of similarities of morphology of teeth and mandibles of monotremes, meridiolestidans and dryolestoids from Northern Hemisphere, and interprets the available data as consistent with origin of monotreme dental pattern from teeth of Gondwanan dryolestoids.
- Ziegler & Lockett (2026) report the discovery of a skull of Megalibgwilia owenii from the Foul Air Cave in the Buchan Caves Reserve, representing the first record of the species from Victoria (Australia).

== Other mammals ==
Name	Novelty	Status	Authors	Age	Type locality	Country	Notes	Images
Amblotherium apiarium	Sp. nov	Valid	Connelly, Rougier & Davis	Late Jurassic (Tithonian)	Morrison Formation	United States (Utah)		
Angrivarodon	Gen. et sp. nov	Valid	Martin et al.	Early Cretaceous (Barremian-Aptian)		Germany	A multituberculate belonging to the paulchoffatiid line. The type species is A. goresi.	
Bondesius major	Sp. nov		Chimento, Agnolín & Novas	Late Cretaceous (Maastrichtian)	Los Alamitos Formation	Argentina		
Camurodon	Gen. et sp. nov	Valid	Shelley et al.	Late Cretaceous	Prince Creek Formation	United States (Alaska)	A multituberculate belonging to the family Cimolomyidae. Genus includes new species C. borealis.	
Cimolodon desosai	Sp. nov	Valid	Wilson Mantilla et al.	Late Cretaceous (Campanian)	El Gallo Formation	Mexico		
Dongoconodon	Gen. et sp. nov	Valid	Bi et al.	Early Cretaceous	Jiufotang Formation	China	A member of Eutriconodonta of uncertain affinities. The type species is D. platycauda.	
Gobiconodon gongzhulingensis	Sp. nov	Valid	Wu et al.	Late Cretaceous (Cenomanian or Turonian)	Quantou Formation	China		
Hainina cassagnauensis	Sp. nov	Valid	Gheerbrant in Gheerbrant, Allain & Laurent	Late Cretaceous (Maastrichtian)	Marnes d'Auzas Formation	France	A multituberculate belonging to the family Kogaionidae.	
Kaniqsiqcosmodon	Gen. et sp. nov	Valid	Shelley et al.	Late Cretaceous	Prince Creek Formation	United States (Alaska)	A multituberculate belonging to the family Microcosmodontidae. Genus includes new species K. polaris.	
Koshikibaatar	Gen. et sp. nov		Sera et al.	Late Cretaceous (Campanian)	Himenoura Group	Japan	A multituberculate belonging to the group Cimolodonta. Genus includes new species K. kashimaensis.	
Qayaqgruk	Gen. et sp. nov	Valid	Shelley et al.	Late Cretaceous	Prince Creek Formation	United States (Alaska)	A multituberculate belonging to the group Djadochtatherioidea. Genus includes new species Q. peregrinus.	
Westphalodon	Gen. et sp. nov	Valid	Martin et al.	Early Cretaceous (Barremian–Aptian)		Germany	A member of the family Gobiconodontidae. The type species is W. goini.	

=== Other mammalian research ===
- Evidence from the study of bone histology indicative of diversity of growth strategies of Mesozoic docodonts, euharamiyidans and multituberculates is provided by Kulik et al. (2026).
- The largest mammal-like tracks from the Lower Cretaceous strata from Gondwana reported to date are described from the Botucatu Formation (Brazil) by Buck et al. (2026), expanding known size range of Early Cretaceous mammaliaforms.
- Redescription and a study on the affinities of Buginbaatar transaltaiensis is published by Lopatin & Averianov (2026).
- Lopatin & Averianov (2026) report the first discovery of fossil material of multituberculates belonging to the group Djadochtatherioidea from the Upper Cretaceous Nemegt Formation (Mongolia).
- New information on the endocranial anatomy of Kryptobaatar dashzevegi is provided by Macrini & Rowe (2026).
- Krause et al. (2026) identify fossil material of "Kimbetopsalis" simmonsae from the Paleocene strata of the Denver Formation (Colorado, United States), extending known geographical range of this species, and transfer the studied species to the genus Taeniolabis.
- Harper & Rougier (2026) describe a meridiolestidan petrosal from the Upper Cretaceous Allen Formation (Argentina), providing evidence of similarities of the morphology of the cochlear canal to those of extant therians, possibly resulting from convergent evolution.
- Bishop & Pierce (2026) reconstruct the musculature of the forelimbs five non-therian synapsids, including Vincelestes neuquenianus.

== General mammalian research ==
- Evidence from the study of extant and extinct mammals, indicating that elongation of digits is an adaptation to arboreality that is widespread in mammals rather than specific to Euarchonta, is presented by Dupont et al. (2026).
- Engelman, Pampush & Croft (2026) report evidence from the study of molars of carnivorous metatherians, hyaenodonts and carnivorans indicating that dental topographic metrics used to study diet of extinct carnivorous mammals are influenced not only by diet but also by homology and phylogeny.
- Migliaro Petroni et al. (2026) describe tracks of a small-bodied, fast-moving mammal from the Upper Cretaceous (Maastrichtian) strata of the Yacoraite Formation (Argentina), assigned to the ichnotaxon Brasilichnium cf. saltatorium and extending known stratigraphic distribution of the ichnogenus Brasilichnium.
- A new, diverse assemblage of teeth of Paleocene (Torrejonian) mammals is reported from the Tullock Member of the Fort Union Formation (Montana, United States) by Hovatter & Wilson Mantilla (2026).
- Evidence indicating that carbon isotope excursions and probable warming events during the Danian were associated with strong pulses of turnover of mammalian assemblages is reported from the study of the fossil record from the San Juan Basin (New Mexico, United States) and other basins in the Rocky Mountain Region is presented by Secord et al. (2026).
- A study on the composition of the Paleocene (Thanetian) mammalian assemblage from Butte de Therdonne in the Paris Basin (France) is published by Métais, Lhomme & Renaud (2026).
- Evidence from the study of teeth of Paleocene placentals from the Nanxiong, Qianshan and Chijiang basins (China), indicating that the studied mammals achieved high dental topographic variability during the first 10 million years of the Cenozoic and that the variability of their dental traits paralleled global and regional environmental changes, is presented by Tseng, Li & Ting (2026), who argue that living placental lineages might originate from phenotypically variable and functionally flexible ancestors such as the mammals from the studied assemblages from paleotropical Asia.
- New fossil material of a colugo and ungulates, possibly including the first known upper dentition of Pakkokuhyus lahirii, is described from the Eocene Pondaung Formation (Myanmar) by Ducrocq et al. (2026).
- He et al. (2026) date the mammalian assemblage from the Relu Basin in the Tibetan Plateau (China) to 39.2–38.1 million years ago, and find that the presence of this assemblage in the studied area coincided with a seasonal rainfall regime, climatic conditions with similarities to Mediterranean-type climate, and expansion of high-elevation subtropical forests.
- Evidence of impact of both regional climate changes (mid-Eocene aridification of Central Asia) and global ones (Paleocene–Eocene thermal maximum and cooling during the Eocene-Oligocene transition) on changes of composition of Paleogene mammal assemblages from Central Asia is presented by Benevento et al. (2026).
- A study on the species richness and morphological diversity of mammals from assemblages from the John Day Formation (Oregon, United States) is published by Peng & Famoso (2026), who find evidence of stronger relationship of sampling at sites from the studied formation with recorded taxonomic diversity than with morphological diversity.
- Reuter et al. (2026) reconstruct functional composition and trophic network structure of mammalian communities living in eastern Oregon throughout the past 32 million years, reporting evidence of changes in response to climate shifts and immigrations from Eurasia.
- Revision of the composition of the assemblages of Neogene terrestrial mammals from the Chesapeake Group (Maryland and Virginia, United States) is published by Eshelman et al. (2026), who interpret the studied faunas as indicative of presence of a combination of forest and grassland habitats, with a gradual shift towards more forested environments.
- Arias-Concha et al. (2026) reconstruct the diet of Miocene rodents and South American native ungulates from the La Venta site (Colombia) on the basis of stable isotope analyses of tooth enamel, reporting evidence of C_{3}-dominated diets of the studied mammals, but also evidence of ecological differentiation.
- Casanovas-Vilar et al. (2026) interpret the small mammal assemblage from the Vallès-Penedès Basin (Spain) as consistent with a climate during the Miocene that was transitional between humid subtropical and Mediterranean types, finding no evidence of significant climate changes at the times of major faunal turnovers.
- Martín-Perea et al. (2026) study the taphonomy of late Miocene mammalian assemblages from the Daidian and Dongmen sites (China), and interpret the studied assemblages as resulting from gradual accumulation through attritional mortality.
- Evidence from fossil data from low latitudes in Mexico, indicating that the dispersal of North American mammals into South America during the Great American Interchange was preceded and primed by their accumulation in Mexico beginning 10 million years ago, is presented by Tseng et al. (2026).
- Sun, de la Torre & Bibi (2026) study the composition of large mammal faunas in Africa and Eurasia throughout the last 10 million years, finding no evidence of waves of faunal dispersal out of Africa, no evidence that early hominins followed dispersal routes of large herbivores out of Africa, no evidence that dispersal of early hominins into Eurasia coincided with major changes in the functional structure of mammalian communities, and no evidence of signification latitudinal differences of the studied communities.
- Cantalapiedra et al. (2026) study the diversification trends of African artiodactyls, perissodactyls and proboscideans during the last 23 million years, and interpret the decline of large African herbivores as more likely caused by low speciation rates and by environmental constraints on speciation linked to prolonged aridification of Africa than by elevated extinction rates.
- Evidence from the study of dental and body mass traits of large herbivores from the Turkana Basin and Tugen Hills, indicating that, unlike individual functional traits of mammals from the studied assemblages, multivariate combinations of traits remained closely aligned with environmental conditions throughout the last 10 million years, is presented by Glöggler et al. (2026); the data and the analytical framework of this study are subsequently reevaluated by Greiner & Dagher (2026), who do not consider the conclusions of the study of Glöggler et al. to be conclusively supported by available data, while Glöggler et al. (2026) reaffirm the robustness of their results.
- Evidence linking late Miocene global cooling and northern Tibetan Plateau uplift to near-synchronous monsoon intensification and turnover of mammalian communities in Asia approximately 8.7 million years ago is presented by Han et al. (2026).
- Choudhary et al. (2026) describe new mammalian fossil material from the Tapar locality (Gujarat, India), interpreted as corroborating late Miocene age of mammals from the studied locality and providing evidence of their biogeographical links with mammals from the lower Nagri Formation.
- Patnaik et al. (2026) determine the mammalian assemblage from the Piram Island (India) to be approximately 8.7 million years old.
- Fossils of a diverse mammalian assemblage, interpreted as living in a wooded savanna environment shortly before the Messinian salinity crisis, are described from the Ouedhref Formation (Tunisia) by Ksila et al. (2026).
- A study on the mammalian assemblages from the Miocene Sahabi Formation and Pliocene Qarat Weddah Formation at the As-Sahabi site (Libya), providing evidence of changes of composition of the studied assemblages likely linked to environmental changes resulting from the Messinian salinity crisis, is published by Al Riaydh, Fara & Smith (2026).
- Evidence from geochemical analyses of teeth of Blancan proboscideans and horses from the Rancho Jorge locality (Sonora, Mexico), indicating that the studied mammals lived in arid environment and had mixed diets based on C_{3} and C_{4} plants, is presented by Hernández-Sandoval et al. (2026).
- Li et al. (2026) describe a late Pliocene proboscidean and even-toed ungulate assemblage (the Dongyancun Fauna) from the Sanmenxia Basin (Zhongtiao Mountains; China), including the first reported Pliocene record of Leptobos in northern China, and providing evidence of composition of large herbivore assemblages in northern China shortly before Quaternary climate changes, arrival of true horses and appearance of Mammuthus meridionalis.
- Vincent et al. (2026) reconstruct the environment from the Oldowan site Nyayanga (Kenya) on the basis of the study of sedimentology, phytoliths and isotopic composition of mammal remains, reporting evidence of a changing, mosaic environment with a fluctuating fluvial activity, and with hominin activity evidenced throughout environmental changes during the late Pliocene.
- Candela et al. (2026) study the composition of the Holarctic mammal assemblage from the Pliocene-Pleistocene strata of the Uquía Formation (Argentina), including a gomphothere record representing the first appearance datum of the group in South America, and interpret the studied mammals as arriving into the Humahuaca Basin within the time interval of approximately 500,000 years.
- Shidqi et al. (2026) review the fossil record of Pleistocene mammals from Sumatra (Indonesia), reporting evidence of presence of mammals with Indochinese and Sundaic affinities and evidence of limited taxonomic losses since the late Middle Pleistocene.
- Zhang et al. (2026) report the discovery of new fossil material of Early Pleistocene mammals from the Yeka locality in the Shangri-La region (Yunnan, China), and interpret the composition of the studied assemblage as indicative of an environment including a forest mixed with a grassland landscape.
- Linchamps et al. (2026) study the composition of the Early Pleistocene small mammal assemblage from the Gondolin GD2 locality (South Africa), interpreted as indicative of environments dominated by grassland and open savannas.
- Evidence from the study of carbon and oxygen isotope composition of tooth enamel of equids, bovids and hippopotamids from Melka Wakena and Gadeb, interpreted as indicative of presence of montane grasslands with shrubs and aquatic habitats in Ethiopian highlands that provided recurrent access to water and vegetation to mammals (including Acheulean-making hominins) in the late Early Pleistocene, is presented by Briatico et al. (2026).
- A study on the composition of the Pleistocene small mammal assemblages from the Kurtak-22-2025 locality in the northern Minusinsk Basin (Siberia, Russia), including elements of European, Siberian and Altai-Sayan faunas (with the easternmost record of Microtus ex gr. hintoni nutiensis-thenii reported to date among the former), is published by Markova et al. (2026).
- Evidence from the study of the composition of Middle and Late Pleistocene small mammalian assemblages from the East European Plain, interpreted as consistent with presence of semi-arid and arid steppe habitats during the warmest and driest phases of the Pleistocene interglacials, is presented Markova, Puzachenko & Tsatskin (2026).
- Robu et al. (2026) reconstruct trophic relationships of Late Pleistocene mammals from cave sites in the Romanian Carpathians with and without bears on the basis of an isotopic analysis of their bones, reporting evidence of overall similar dietary behavior of the studied mammals throughout Europe during Marine Isotope Stage 3, as well as evidence of mainly herbivorous diet of cave bears that included varying levels of animal protein consumption, and interpret the dietary behavior of the studied cave bears as possibly influenced by abundance of the carnivores.
- Russo et al. (2026) study the composition of Pleistocene faunal assemblages from the Naame, Nahr Ibrahim and Ras el-Kelb sites (Lebanon) and tooth wear of ungulates from these sites, while Russo et al. (2026) study the isotopic composition of tooth enamel of ungulates from the three studied sites; the two studies provide evidence interpreted as indicative of persistence of Mediterranean seasonality and woodland ecosystems in the area of central Levantine coast between 400,000 and 100,000 years ago, resulting in existence of an ecological refugium that supporting diverse ungulate assemblages and enabled distinct, seasonal hominin foraging strategies, and evidence indicative of ecological differentiation between central and southern Levant in the studied time interval.
- Zeigen et al. (2026) study the isotopic composition of carbonate from the tooth enamel of the Persian fallow deers from sediments of the Amud Cave (Israel) associated with Neanderthal activity, interpreted as suggestive of exploitation of different habitats by fallow deer and gazelles from the site, and suggesting that fallow deer and gazelles were targeted by Neanderthals from the Amud Cave through different procurement strategies.
- Orbach et al. (2026) study the mammalian remains from a Pleistocene hyena den from the Geula Cave (Israel), reporting evidence of exploitation of similar ungulate communities by hyenas and humans during the mid-Middle Paleolithic, likely made possible by high ungulate diversity at the time, reducing competitive pressure between hyenas and humans.
- Hartman et al. (2026) reconstruct the environment of Pleistocene gazelles and Persian fallow deer from the Mughr el-Hamamah site (Jordan) on the basis of isotopic analysis of their teeth, interpret their findings as indicative of conditions that were favorable for human occupations during a humid phase of the Last Glacial cycle, and estimate that the hunting area of Early Upper Paleolithic humans from the site covered ∼36 square kilometers.
- García-Morato et al. (2026) review the fossil record of small-bodied mammals from Middle to Later Stone Age sites in South Africa, and report evidence of impact of site-specific ecological factors on the composition of the studied assemblages.
- Sawada et al. (2026) interpret burned bone fragments from the terminal Paleolithic strafa from the Fukui Cave (Japan) as more likely to be evidence of human exploitation of medium-sized artiodactyls than evidene of exploitation of large mammals that became extinct in the Pleistocene.
- Evidence indicating that deposition of sediments preserving bones of mammals (mostly mammoths) at The Mammoth Site (South Dakota, United States) happened during Marine Isotope Stages 6 and 7 is presented by Mahan et al. (2026).
- Pym et al. (2026) reconstruct changes of late Pleistocene megafaunal populations from the Isthmus of Panama on the basis of the study of spores of coprophilous fungi from sediments of the La Yeguada lake, providing evidence of three distinct phases of decline and recovery coinciding with shifts in vegetation composition.
- Marin-Monfort et al. (2026) study the taphonomy of Pleistocene large mammal remains from the Salto de Piedra paleontological locality (Argentina), report evidence of tooth marks produced by Smilodon populator and by medium-sized canids (possibly Dusicyon avus), and interpret the accumulation, disarticulation and rapid skeletonization of remains from the studied assemblage as linked to carnivore activities.
- Asevedo et al. (2026) determine the diet and habitats of Pleistocene Notiomastodon platensis, Toxodon platensis and cf. Eremotherium from the Teles Pires basin in Brazilian Amazon on the basis of tooth wear and carbon and oxygen stable isotope data from their remains, interpreting T. platensis and cf. Eremotherium as browsers from woodland habitats, and interpreting different individuals of N. platensis as browsers from woodlands and mixed feeders from savanna-like landscapes.
- Brito, Leal & Dantas (2026) report the discovery of a new assemblage of Pleistocene mammals from fossiliferous tank deposits in the municipalities of Mirante and Anagé (Bahia, Brazil), and interpret carbon and oxygen isotopic composition of the studied bones as consistent with overall generalist herbivorous diets of the studied mammals.
- Oliveira et al. (2026) study the composition of the Late Pleistocene mammalian assemblage from the Toca Fria cave (Brazil), and interpret the studied assemblage as including mammals from two habitas: a low-density forest and an open savanna.
- Cruz, Bocherens & Dantas (2026) reconstruct the diet of Eremotherium laurillardi and indeterminate toxodontines from the Serra do Medo site (Pernambuco, Brazil) on the basis of the study of the isotopic composition of their teeth, and interpret the studied mammals as living in warmer and drier habitat compared to other late Pleistocene localities from the Brazilian Intertropical Region.
- Evidence of impact of depositional context on the composition of the fossil assemblages of Quaternary mammals from the Brazilian Intertropical Region is presented by Araújo-Júnior et al. (2026).
- Carrasco et al. (2026) report evidence of losses of functional diversity of terrestrial mammalian assemblages from Brazilian Pampa resulting from late Quaternary extinctions, and find that only some of the introduced mammals might be ecological substitutes for extinct megafauna.
- Neves et al. (2026) study the composition of the Quaternary small mammal assemblage from the Araras Ravine at the Lajedo de Soledade site (Rio Grande do Norte, Brazil), providing evidence of similarities with extant faunas from open environments in the Caatinga and Cerrado.
- Yrarrazaval et al. (2026) study the taphonomy of the Pleistocene mammalian remains from the GNL Quintero 1 site (Chile), and find no conclusive evidence of formation of the bonebed through human activity.
- A study on the late Pleistocene/early Holocene fauna from the Pikimachay Cave (Peru) is published by Yataco et al. (2026), who interpret the studied site as likely to be a giant ground sloth burrow that was also used by carnivores and/or humans.
- Hullot et al. (2026) propose a standardized methodological framework for the study of enamel histology in fossil taxa, and apply it to the study of enamel histology and growth of molars of toxodont notoungulates Pleurostylodon modicus, Eurygenium pacegnum, Adinotherium ovinum and Nesodon imbricatus.
- Von Koenigswald (2026) reviews the morphological diversity of incisors and canines in extant and fossil mammals.
- Wilson et al. (2026) compare the wear of bilophodont teeth in xenungulates, pyrotheres, fossil and modern tapirs and in extant marsupials, and interpret their findings as suggestive of browsing feeding behaviors of xenungulates and fossil tapirs, as well as of variable diets of different members of Pyrotheria.
- Evidence of preservation of amino acids in tooth enamel of fossil proboscideans, equids and rhinocerotids dating back as far as 48 million years is presented by Gatti et al. (2026).
- Herrando-Pérez et al. (2026) present a dataset of ages obtained through radiocarbon dating by accelerator mass spectrometry of bone collagen from remains of late Quaternary mammalian megafauna from Eurasia and North America.
- Review of advances in the study of paleogenomics of Chinese Quaternary proboscideans, even- and odd-toed ungulates and large carnivorans from the preceding years is published by Sheng et al. (2026).
- Köhler (2026) reviews the evolution of traits of organims from inland environments (including extinct Myotragus) that are adaptations to life in low-mortality isolated ecosystems with limited resources, and notes similarities with the evolution of traits of organisms adapted to life in caves.
- Schowanek et al. (2026) study factors influencing survival probability of mammals living in tropical forests of Africa, the Americas and the Indomalayan realm during the past 130,000 years, and report that analyses utilizing different statistical models recover similar predictors of extinction risk at the global scale, but recover variable predictors of extinction risk at smaller spatial scales.
- Kennedy & Sumanarathna (2026) present the first three-dimensional palaeoart reconstructions of Palaeoloxodon namadicus sinhaleyus and the Quaternary rhinoceros from the Sabaragamuwa Basin (Sri Lanka) historically referred to as Rhinoceros sinhaleyus.
- Faria et al. (2026) determine the ecology of Holocene Eremotherium laurillardi, Notiomastodon platensis, Toxodon platensis, Smilodon populator, Palaeolama major and Xenorhinotherium bahiense from the Jirau and Rio Miranda sites (Brazil) on the basis of the study of the isotopic composition of their teeth, and interpret the Brazilian Intertropical Region as one of the last environmental refuges for the studied mammals.
- Toledo et al. (2026) compare the complexity of the organization of the manus and pes of extant mammals and extinct xenarthrans and litopterns, reporting evidence of convergences in the organization of limb extremities of litopterns and extant ungulates, and of atypical patterns in xenarthrans.
- Evidence from the study of extant mammals, indicative of impact of multiple factors on variability of carbon isotope ratios in herbivore tooth enamel and overall strongest impact of the dietary guild membership, is presented by Davenport, Irmis & Norwood (2026).
- Sotelo et al. (2026) simulate possible future fossil record of extant land mammals, and interpret their findings as indicating that conclusions on the evolution of body mass and diet drawn from the study of the fossil record of mammals might be significantly affected by biases such as incompleteness of the fossil record.
