= Calafiacetus =

Calafiacetus Temporal range: Late Oligocene

Scientific classification
- Kingdom: Animalia
- Phylum: Chordata
- Class: Mammalia
- Order: Artiodactyla
- Infraorder: Cetacea
- Parvorder: Mysticeti
- Clade: Chaeomysticeti
- Genus: †Calafiacetus
- Species: †C. longipinna

Binomial name
- †Calafiacetus longipinna Solis-Añorvea et al., 2026

Extinct genus of baleen whale

Calafiacetus is an extinct genus of baleen whale that lived during the Chattian stage of the Oligocene epoch.

== Palaeobiology ==
=== Locomotion ===
Calafiacetus longipinna exhibited an undulatory locomotory pattern, which was facilitated by its vertebral centra being elongated.
