= Otaria josefinae =

Otaria josefinae Temporal range: Late Pliocene–Early Pleistocene

Scientific classification
- Kingdom: Animalia
- Phylum: Chordata
- Class: Mammalia
- Order: Carnivora
- Parvorder: Pinnipedia
- Family: Otariidae
- Genus: Otaria
- Species: O. josefinae

Binomial name
- Otaria josefinae Hostos-Olivera et al., 2026

Extinct species of pinniped

Otaria josefinae is an extinct species of pinniped in the genus Otaria that lived during the Pliocene and Pleistocene epochs.

== Palaeobiology ==
=== Social structure ===
Otaria josefinae was a moderately sized otariid that exhibited substantial sexual dimorphism and was polygynous.
