= Galanthisictis =

Galanthisictis Temporal range: Messinian

Scientific classification
- Kingdom: Animalia
- Phylum: Chordata
- Class: Mammalia
- Order: Carnivora
- Family: Mustelidae
- Genus: †Galanthisictis
- Species: †G. baskini

Binomial name
- †Galanthisictis baskini (Valenciano et al., 2026)

Extinct genus of musteline mustelid

Galanthisictis is an extinct monotypic genus of mustelid carnivoran that lived in what is now Spain during the Messinian stage of the Miocene epoch.

== Etymology ==
Its original generic name, Galanthis, refers to the Greek mythological woman Galanthis. This name turned out to be preoccupied by the name of a genus of marine gastropod Galanthis Gistel (1848), necessitating the creation of a replacement name. The specific epithet of the type species, G. baskini, honours Dr. Jon A. Baskin, a vertebrate palaeontologist who specialised in studying Neogene musteloids.
