= Lonchotrigonatus =

Lonchotrigonatus Temporal range: Thanetian–Ypresian

Scientific classification
- Kingdom: Animalia
- Phylum: Chordata
- Class: Mammalia
- Genus: †Lonchotrigonatus
- Species: †L. osvaldoi

Binomial name
- †Lonchotrigonatus osvaldoi Carneiro et al., 2026

Extinct genus of notometatherian

Lonchotrigonatus is an extinct monotypic genus of notometatherian that lived in South America during the Thanetian and Ypresian stages of the Palaeogene period.

== Palaeobiology ==
=== Diet ===
The buccolingual compression of the main cusp of P_{2} and P_{3} in Lonchotrigonatus osvaldoi suggests it was carnivorous, though it was not as specialised for carnivory as sparassodonts like hathliacynids.
