= Pozodolops =

Pozodolops Temporal range: Bartonian–Chattian

Scientific classification
- Kingdom: Animalia
- Phylum: Chordata
- Class: Mammalia
- Order: †Polydolopimorphia
- Family: †Wamradolopidae
- Genus: †Pozodolops
- Species: †P. manuelorum

Binomial name
- †Pozodolops manuelorum Stutz et al., 2026

Extinct genus of wamradolopid mammals

Pozodolops is an extinct monotypic genus of wamradolopid metatherian that lived in South America during the Eocene and Oligocene epochs.

== Description ==
Pozodolops was extremely small in body mass, weighing between 3 and 55 g. It had an extremely long P^{3} and P_{3} relative to M^{1} and M_{1} respectively. Its molars were bunodont, with its maxillary molars possessing metaconules that were large in size and lingually displaced, though that did not reach the level of the protocone lingually. The metaconules also had a developed postmetaconular crest, while lacking a premetaconular crest or possessing only a very small one.
