= Bison constantini =

Bison constantini Temporal range: Early Pleistocene

Scientific classification
- Kingdom: Animalia
- Phylum: Chordata
- Class: Mammalia
- Order: Artiodactyla
- Family: Bovidae
- Subfamily: Bovinae
- Genus: Bos
- Subgenus: Bison
- Clade: †Eobison
- Species: †B. constantini

Binomial name
- †Bison constantini Vislobokova, Titov and Yarmolchyk, 2026

Extinct species of Bison

Bison constantini is an extinct species of Bison with remains dating from the Early Pleistocene of the Taurida Cave in the central Crimean peninsula. The species was named by Vislobokova, Titov and Yarmolchyk (2026) based on remains from multiple individuals, including horn cores, incomplete mandibles (lower jaw) and upper jaw bones of both juvenile and adult individuals, teeth and limb bones.
