= Nicholas Pyenson =

American paleontologist

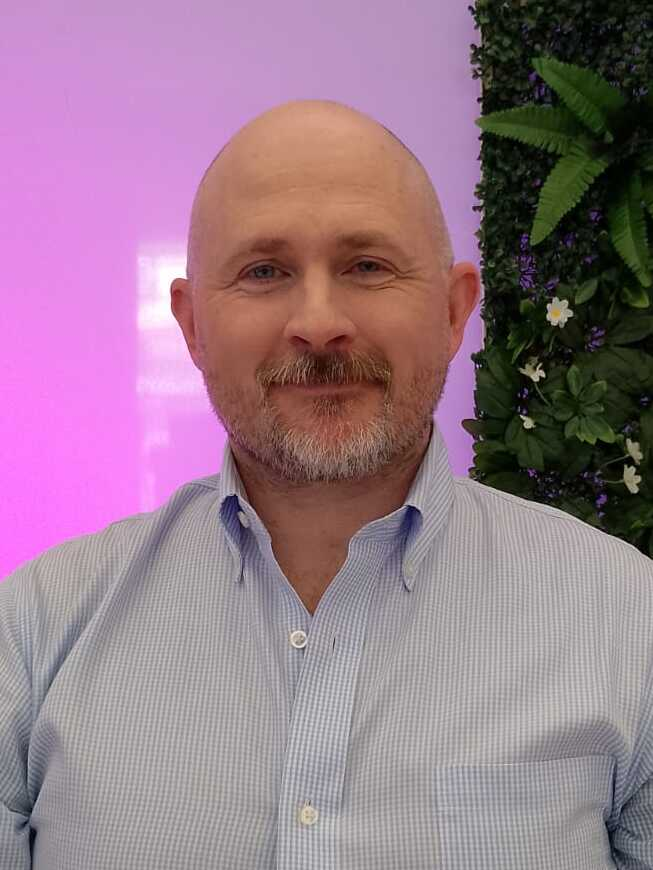
- Pyenson in 2025
- Born: Nicholas D. Pyenson; 1980 (age 45–46)
- Education: Emory University (BA); University of California, Berkeley (PhD)
- Awards: Presidential Early Career Award for Scientists and Engineers; World Economic Forum Young Scientist Award
- Scientific career
- Fields: Paleontology, Cetology
- Workplaces: National Museum of Natural History

Nicholas D. Pyenson (born 1980) is a paleontologist and the curator of fossil marine mammals at the Smithsonian Institution’s National Museum of Natural History in Washington, DC. He is the author of numerous popular science works including the book Spying on Whales: The Past, Present, and Future of Earth's Most Awesome Creatures.

== Education ==
Pyenson received a Bachelor's Degree from Emory University. In 2002, Pyenson moved to the University of California, Berkeley, where he received a PhD in Integrative Biology in 2008, advised by Anthony Barnosky and David Lindberg. During this time, he was also working in the University of California Museum of Paleontology. Pyenson's interest in whales led him to his dissertation topic, "Understanding the paleoecology and evolution of cetaceans in the Eastern North Pacific Ocean during the Neogene." Following his PhD, Pyenson completed a postdoctoral fellowship at the University of British Columbia.

== Research and career ==
Pyenson's research centers focuses on evolutionary patterns in marine animals through time, with a particular focus on patterns of convergent evolution in whales, but has also studied sea-cows, sea turtles, pinnipeds, sharks, and other marine animals. Pyenson has published over 70 scientific publications, including cover articles in the journals Science and Nature, studying questions about the evolution of body size in papers like "Why whales are big but not bigger: Physiological drivers and ecological limits in the age of ocean giants" (2019) and "Early and fast rise of Mesozoic ocean giants" (2021). In 2012, Pyenson and colleagues reported the discovery of a novel sensory organ that facilitates the behavior in some rorqual baleen whales known as "lunge feeding". Other work has developed the understanding of the odontocete melon, a structure involved in echolocation.

In 2017, Pyenson was awarded a Presidential Early Career Award for Scientists and Engineers by President Barack Obama, and has won numerous research awards from the Smithsonian, including the Secretary’s Research Prize. Pyenson is a member of the Young Scientists community at the World Economic Forum, a Kavli Fellow at the National Academy of Sciences, and a Fulbright Specialist at the US State Department.

== Writing and media ==
Pyenson's writing on topics from whales to science and society have appeared in publications such as The New York Times, Scientific American, Smithsonian, and The Washington Post. His work has been the subject of articles in publications including National Geographic, The New York Times, The Wall Street Journal, The New Yorker, NPR, and more.

His book, Spying on Whales: The Past, Present, and Future of Earth's Most Awesome Creatures (Viking Press, 2018) was called “the best of science writing” by noted biologist E. O. Wilson, was positively reviewed by NPR and The New York Times, and was a finalist in 2019 for the Best Young Adult Science Book from the American Association for the Advancement of Science.
