= Nyctodon =

Nyctodon Temporal range: Thanetian–Ypresian

Scientific classification
- Kingdom: Animalia
- Phylum: Chordata
- Class: Mammalia
- Family: †Pucadelphyidae
- Genus: †Nyctodon
- Species: †N. ladevezeae

Binomial name
- †Nyctodon ladevezeae Carneiro et al., 2026

Extinct genus of metatherian mammal

Nyctodon is an extinct monotypic genus of metatherian mammal that lived in Brazil during the Palaeogene period.

== Description ==
Nyctodon possessed small entoconids, extremely enlarged hypoconulids, large and broad trigonids relative to talonids, and a broad, V-shaped protocone characterised by a well-developed protoconal bulge.
