= Procervulus =

Procervulus Temporal range: Miocene
- Reconstructed skull, skeleton, and life restoration of P. mizunami

Scientific classification
- Kingdom: Animalia
- Phylum: Chordata
- Class: Mammalia
- Order: Artiodactyla
- Family: Cervidae
- Subfamily: †Procervulinae
- Genus: †Procervulus

Extinct genus of deer

Procervulus is an extinct genus of deer found in Neogene deposits in Europe and Asia. It possessed horns that were not shed.

== Palaeobiology ==
Osteohistological analysis of Procervulus praelucidus long bones suggests that the species grew more slowly than modern deer, and comparisons between it and other extinct and extant cervids suggest that its inferred growth rate was the slowest growth rate in the cervid family. Enamel histology shows Procervulus cf. dichotomus from els Casots exhibited a fast daily secretion rate (DSR) of its tooth enamel, indicative of a fast growth rate and life history. The same method reveals Procervulus ginsburgi had a rapid DSR and enamel extension rate (EER) as well as a short crown formation time (CFT), each of these variables suggesting a fast lif history for this species. This is in contrast to P. praelucidus, whose life history was significantly slower.

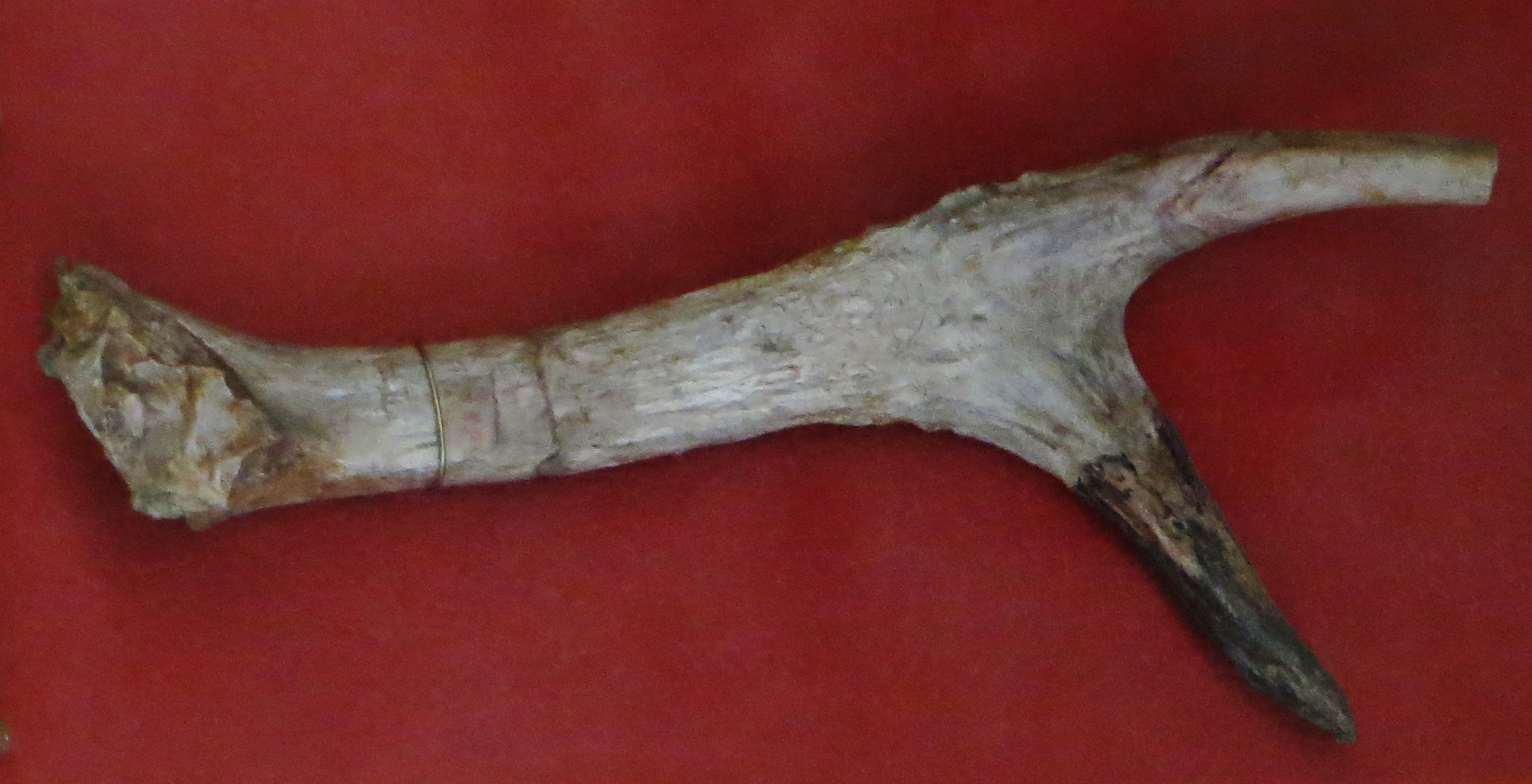
Antler of P. aurelianensis

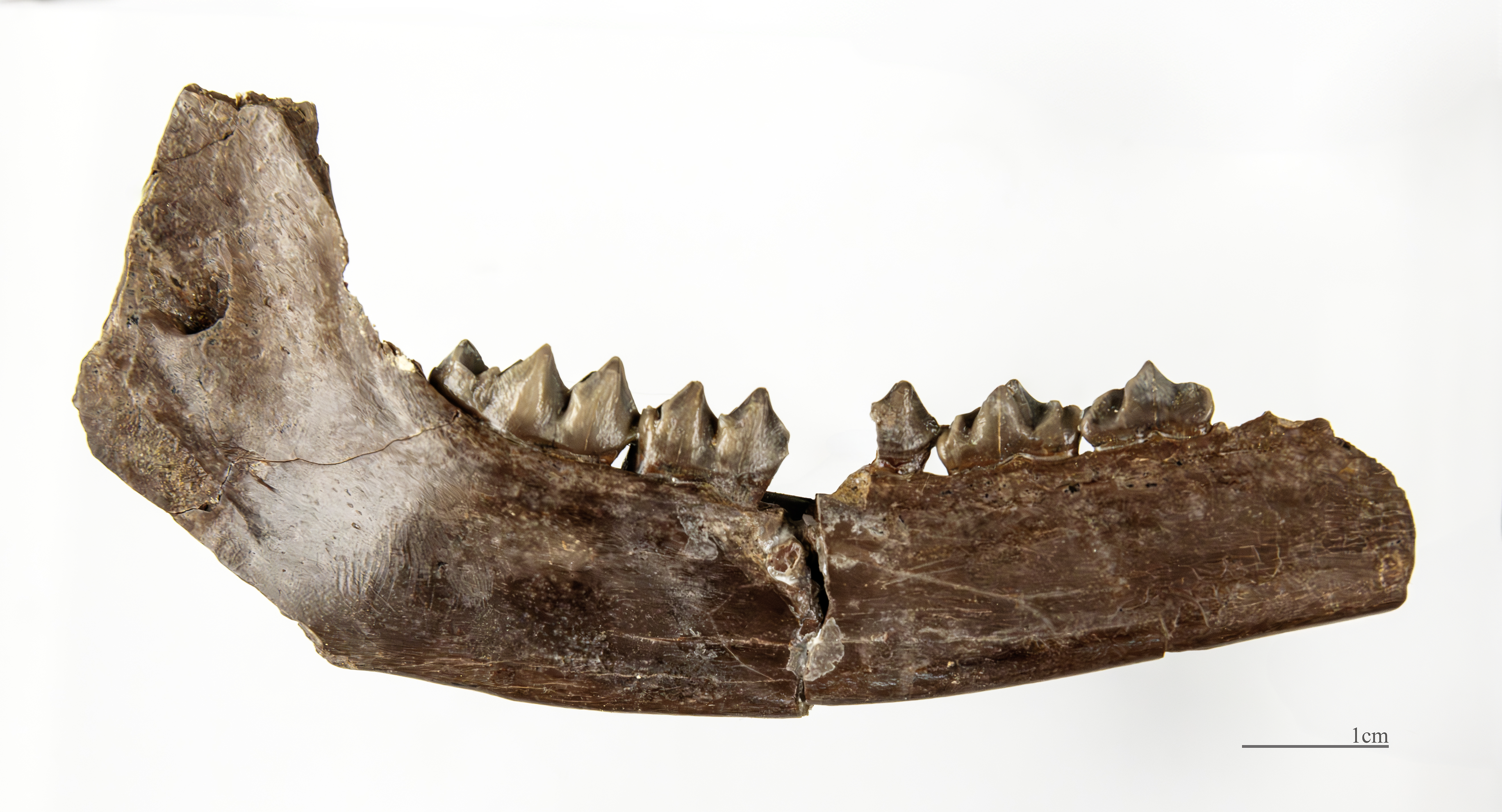
P. dichotomus left hemimandible, MHNT

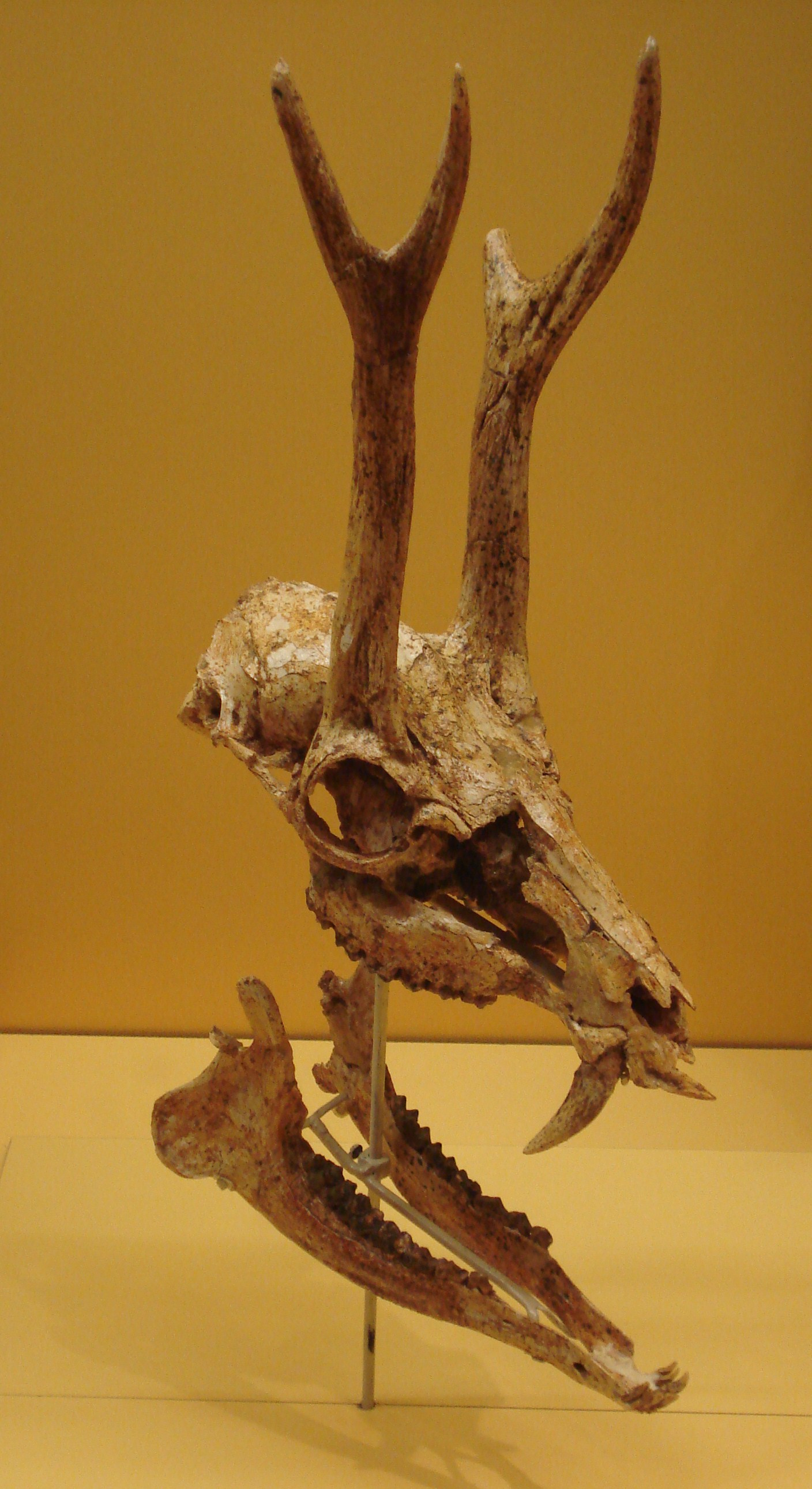
Skull of Procervulus sp., Museum Mensch und Natur, München
