= Bondesius =

Bondesius Temporal range: Maastrichtian

Scientific classification
- Kingdom: Animalia
- Phylum: Chordata
- Class: Mammalia
- Subclass: Theria
- Genus: †Bondesius; Bonaparte, 1990

Type species
- Bondesius ferox Bonaparte, 1990

Other species
- Bondesius major Chimento et al. 2026

Extinct genus of therian mammal

Bondesius is an extinct genus of therian mammal that lived during the Maastrichtian stage of the Late Cretaceous epoch.

== Palaeobiology ==
=== Palaeoecology ===
Based on the shape and morphology of its teeth, Bondesius major had a faunivorous or insectivorous diet.
