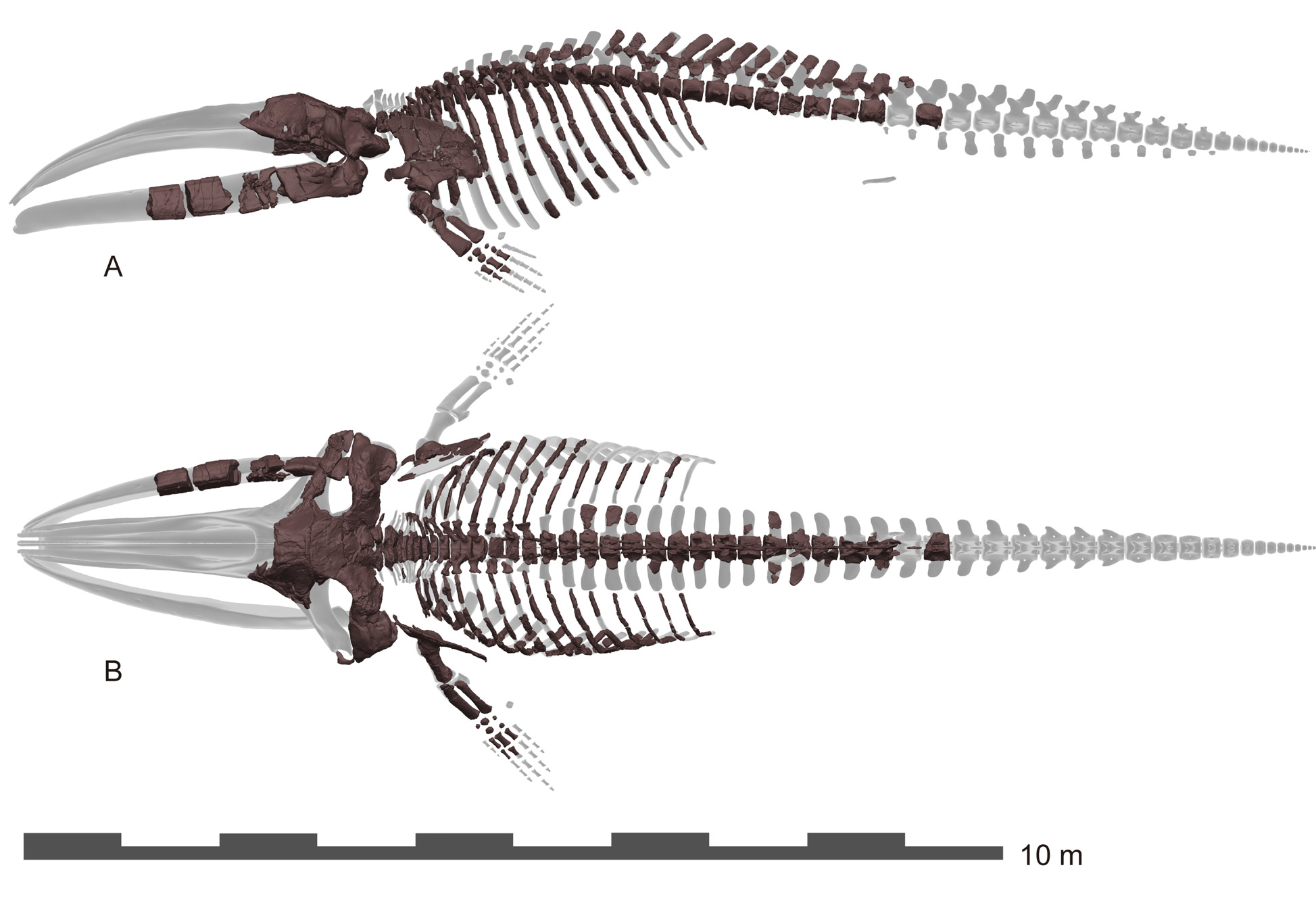
- Reconstructed skeleton of the holotype

Scientific classification
- Kingdom: Animalia
- Phylum: Chordata
- Class: Mammalia
- Order: Artiodactyla
- Infraorder: Cetacea
- Parvorder: Mysticeti
- Family: Balaenidae
- Genus: †Megabalaena; Tanaka et al., 2025
- Species: †M. sapporoensis

Binomial name
- †Megabalaena sapporoensis Tanaka et al., 2025

= Megabalaena =

Megabalaena Temporal range: Late Miocene (Tortonian), 9.4–8.6 Ma

Extinct baleen whale genus

Megabalaena (lit. '"large Balaena"') is an extinct genus of baleen whale known from the Toyama Formation of Japan, which dates to the late Miocene epoch (~9 million years ago). The genus contains a single species, Megabalaena sapporoensis, known from a partial skeleton including a partial skull. It is classified within the family Balaenidae, which contains the modern right whales and bowhead whale. Megabalaena likely had a full body length of 12.7 metres (42 ft).

== Discovery and naming ==
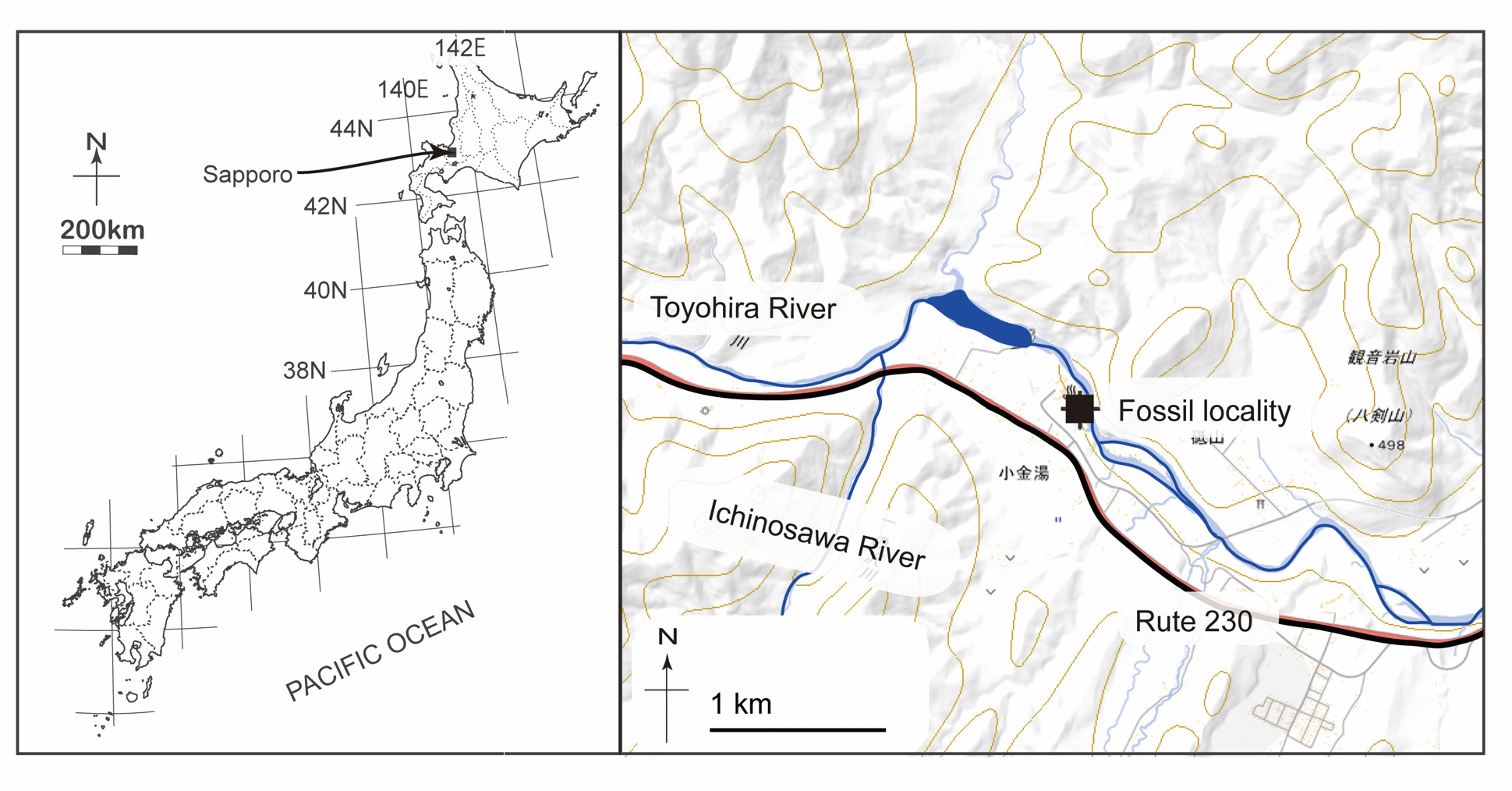
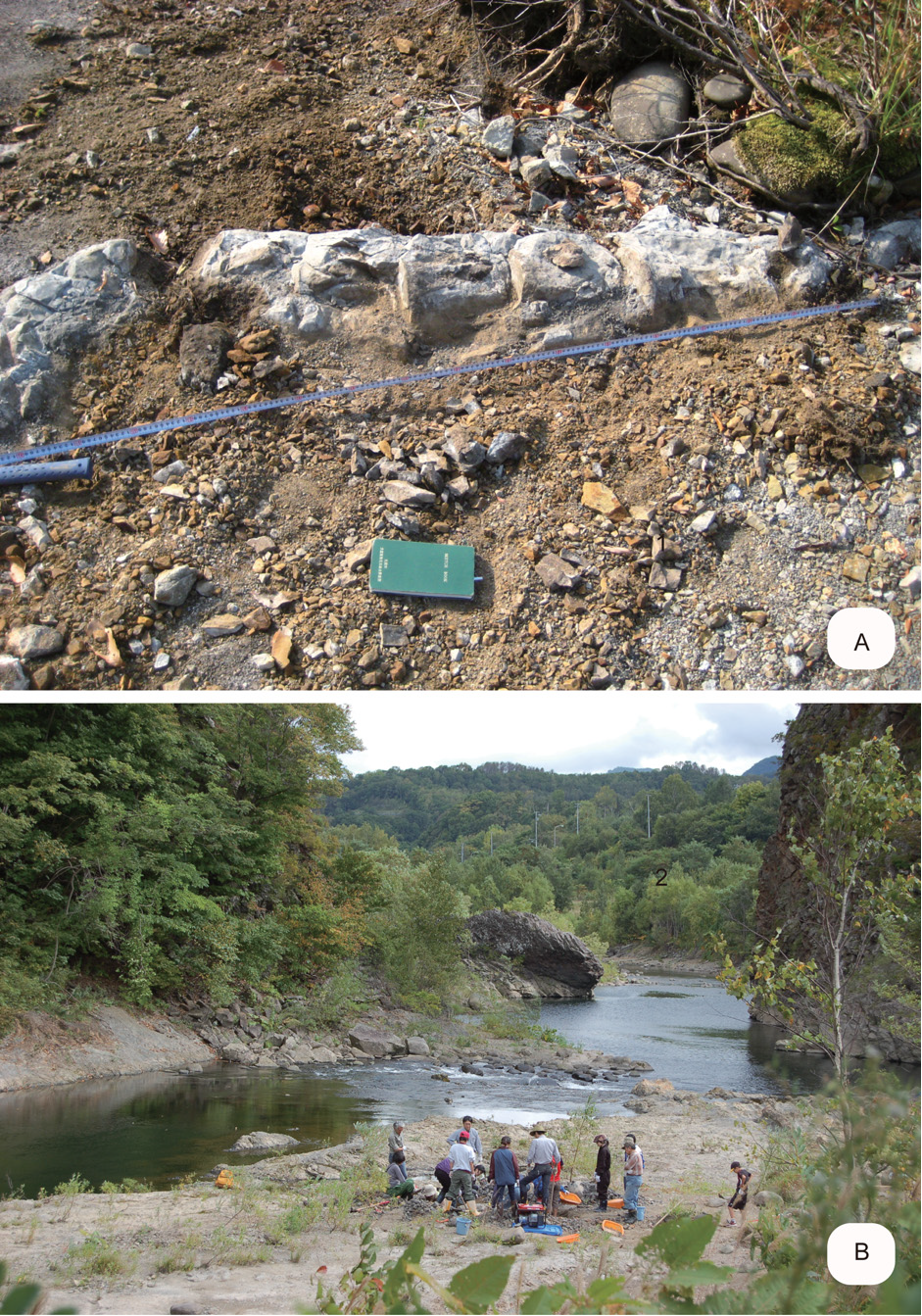
Map of the type locality in Japan (left) and photographs of the holotype excavation (right)

The Megabalaena holotype specimen, SMAC 2731, was discovered in October 2008 by Kazuhisa Mori in outcrops of the Toyama Formation on the bank of the Toyohira River in Sapporo of Hokkaido, Japan. The specimen was excavated and collected over the following several years. It comprises a partial skeleton, including the posterior (rear) skull and right mandible, bones of the hyoid apparatus, the sternum, 32 vertebrae, most of which were found in articulation (seven cervical (neck) vertebrae, nine thoracic vertebrae, and 16 more posterior vertebrae), many rib fragments, both scapulae, and much of the left forelimb (humerus, ulna, radius, five carpals, three metacarpals, and two phalanges).

In 2025, Tanaka and colleagues described Megabalaena sapporoensis as a new genus and species of balaenid whales based on these fossil remains. The generic name, Megabalaena, combines the Ancient Greek word μέγας (mégas), meaning "large" and "great", with the genus Balaena (the bowhead whale), the type genus of the family Balaenidae. The specific name, sapporoensis, references the discovery of the holotype in the city of Sapporo. The name Sapporo whale has also been used for this species.

== Description ==
Using different equations derived from measurements of the width of the skull, the total body length of Megabalaena can be calculated at either 12.7 metres (42 ft) or 15 m (49 ft). Tanaka et al. (2025) preferred the former, as the equation used is specialized for balaenid whales. This would classify Megabalaena as a large-sized (10–13.5 m (33–44 ft)) balaenid, though the upper estimate would make it a gigantic taxon (>14 m (46 ft)).

In comparison to modern right whales, which are characterized by their especially thick bodies and strongly-arched rostra, Megabalaena has a more slender body and an elongate, weakly curved snout.

== Classification ==
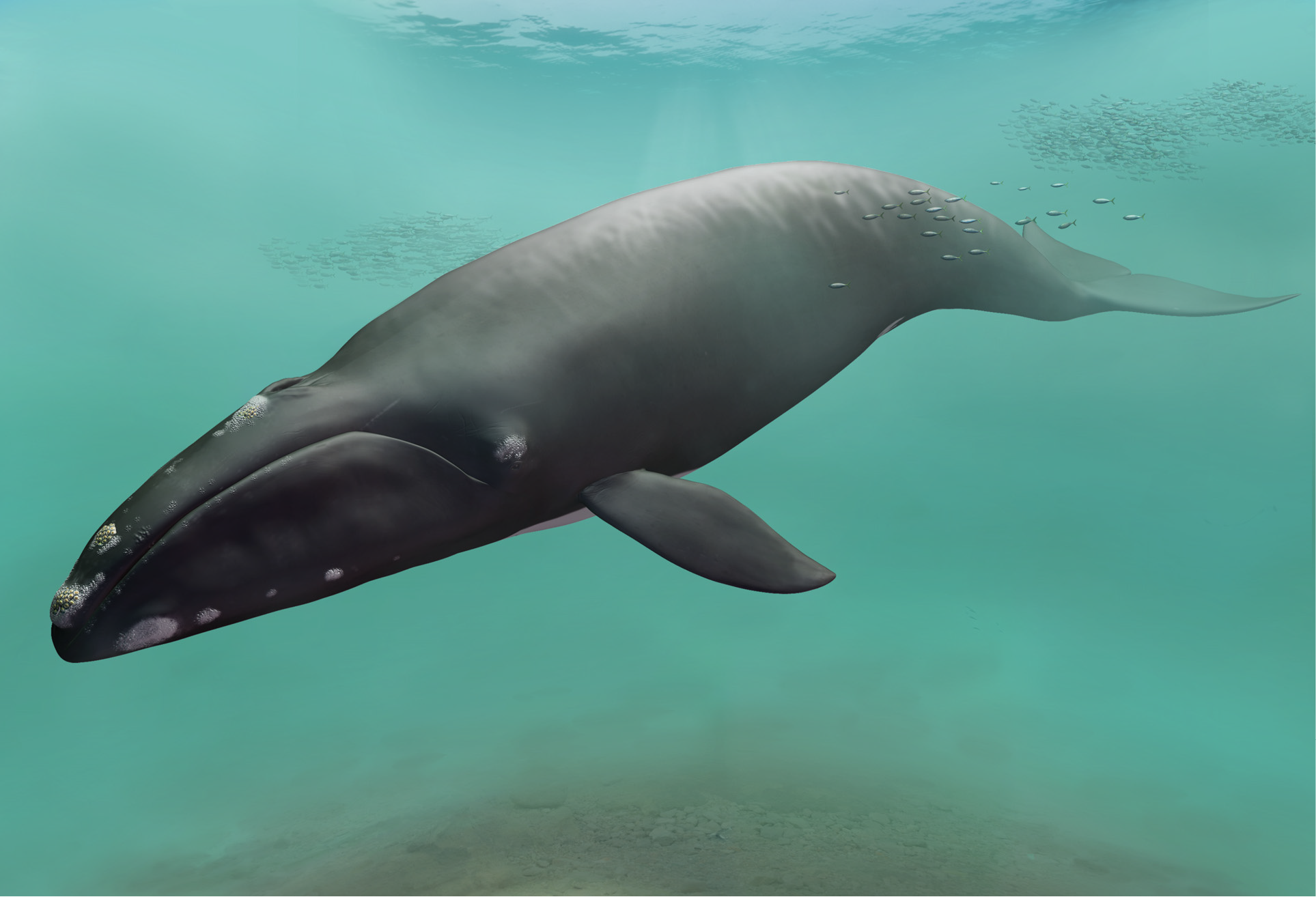
Speculative life restoration

Size compared to a human

In their phylogenetic analysis using implied weighting (k=3), Tanaka et al. (2025) recovered Megabalaena as a member of the mysticete (baleen whale) family Balaenidae, as the sister taxon to a clade containing the extinct taxa Antwerpibalaena and Eubalaena ianitrix (known from Belgium) and Charadrobalaena (known from Italy). It notably helps to fill a ~9 million-year-old 'ghost lineage' between the oldest known balaenids (Morenocetus and Peripolocetus) and all other known fossil balaenids, which are known from much more recent layers. These phylogenetic results are displayed in the cladogram below:

- Balaenidae
  - †Morenocetus parvus
  - †Peripolocetus vexillifer
  - - - †Megabalaena sapporoensis
      - - †Antwerpibalaena liberatlas
        - †Charadrobalaena valentinae
        - †Eubalaena ianitrix
    - - - †Archaeobalaena dosanko
        - †Balaenula astensis
        - †Balaenella brachyrhynchus
      - - - †Balaena ricei
          - †Balaena montalionis
          - Balaena mysticetus (bowhead whale)
        - - Eubalaena japonica (North Pacific right whale)
          - Eubalaena australis (Southern right whale)
          - - Eubalaena glacialis (North Atlantic right whale)
            - †Eubalaena shinshuensis
