= List of mammals of Svalbard and Jan Mayen =

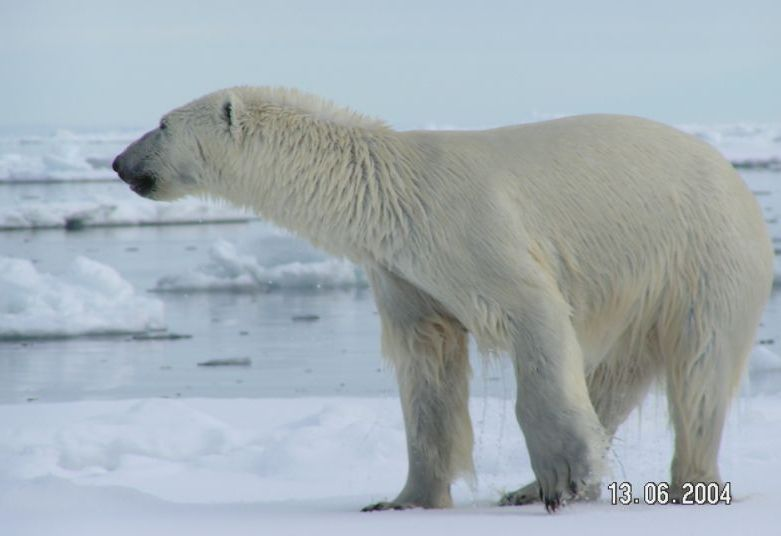
Polar bear

This is a list of mammal species recorded in Svalbard and Jan Mayen. There are seventeen mammal species in Svalbard and Jan Mayen, of which three are endangered and three are vulnerable.

Icons which state each species' global IUCN status:
CR	Critically endangered	In imminent risk of extinction in the wild
EN	Endangered	Facing an extremely high risk of extinction in the wild
VU	Vulnerable	Facing a high risk of extinction in the wild
NT	Near threatened	Doesn't meet any of the criteria that would categorise it as risking extinction but likely to in the future
LC	Least concern	No current identifiable risks to this species
DD	Data deficient	There is inadequate information to make an assessment of the risks to this species

== Order: Rodentia (rodents) ==
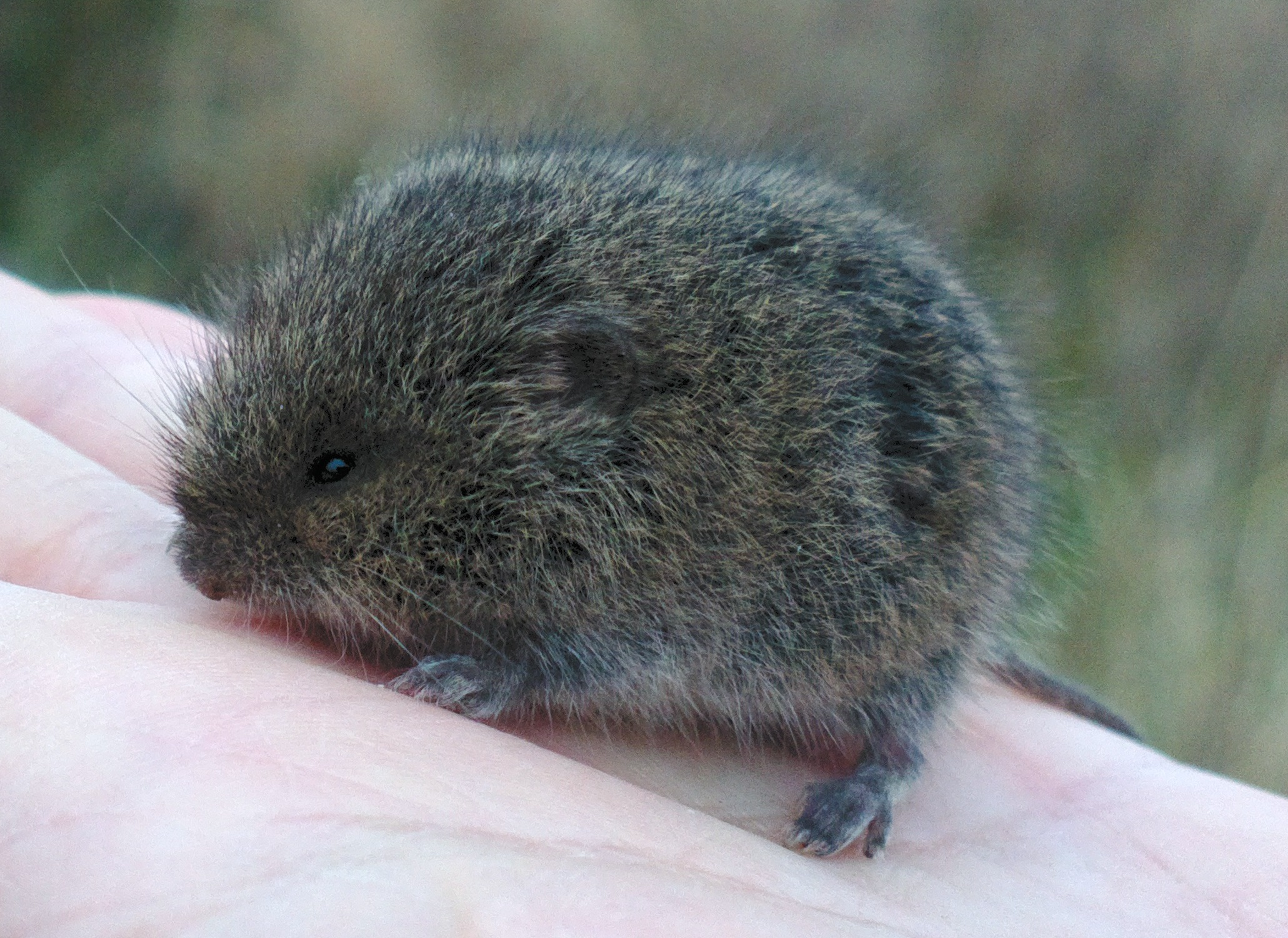
Southern vole

Rodents make up the largest order of mammals, with over 40 percent of mammalian species. They have two incisors in the upper and lower jaw which grow continually and must be kept short by gnawing.

- Suborder: Sciurognathi
    - Family: Cricetidae
      - Subfamily: Arvicolinae
        - Genus: Microtus
          - Southern vole, Microtus levis LC introduced

== Order: Lagomorpha (rabbits, hares and pikas) ==
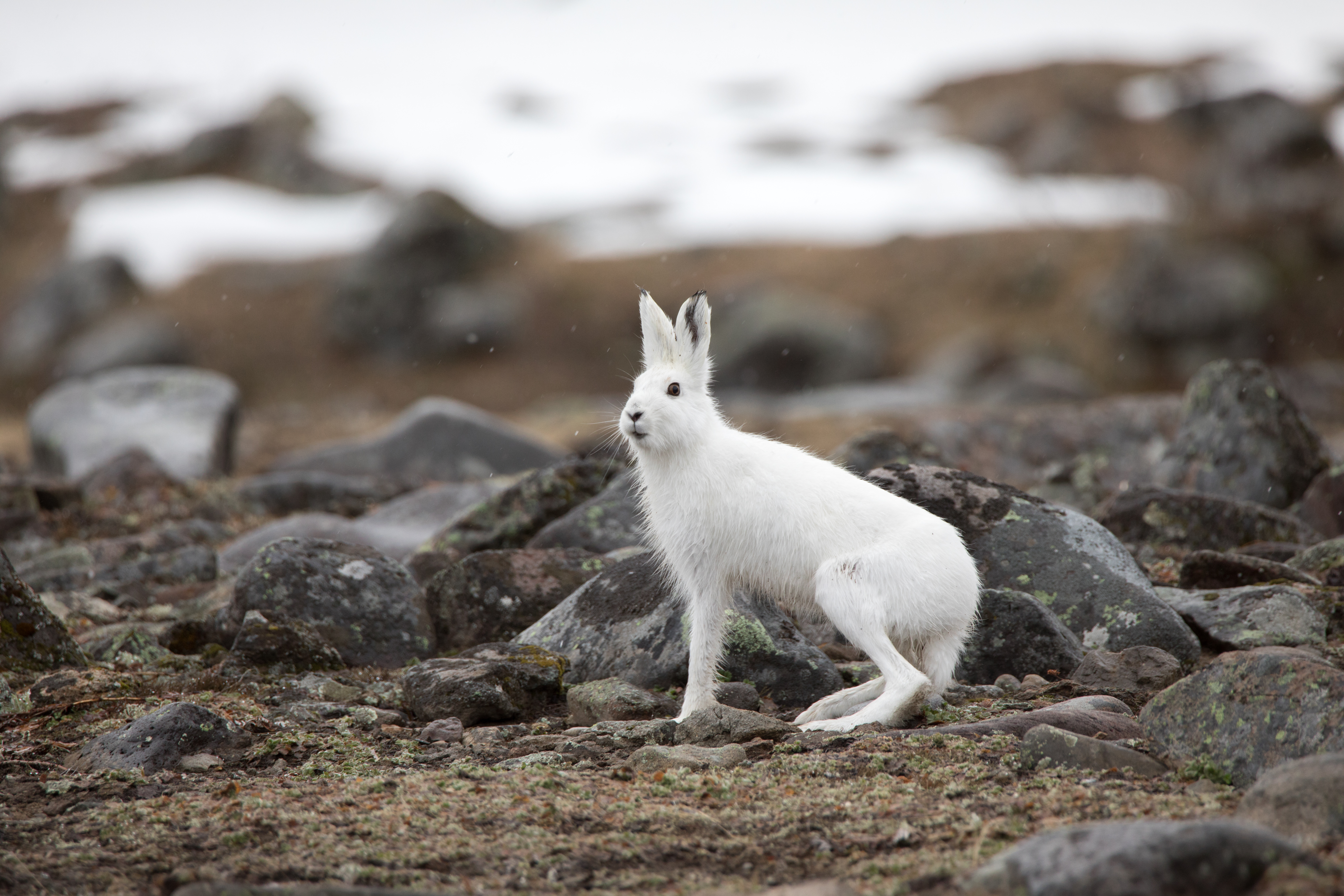
Mountain hare in winter pelage

The lagomorphs comprise two families, Leporidae (hares and rabbits), and Ochotonidae (pikas). Though they can resemble rodents, and were classified as a superfamily in that order until the early 20th century, they have since been considered a separate order. They differ from rodents in a number of physical characteristics, such as having four incisors in the upper jaw rather than two.

- Family: Leporidae (rabbits, hares)
  - Genus: Lepus
    - Mountain hare, L. timidus LC introduced, extirpated

== Order: Cetacea (whales) ==
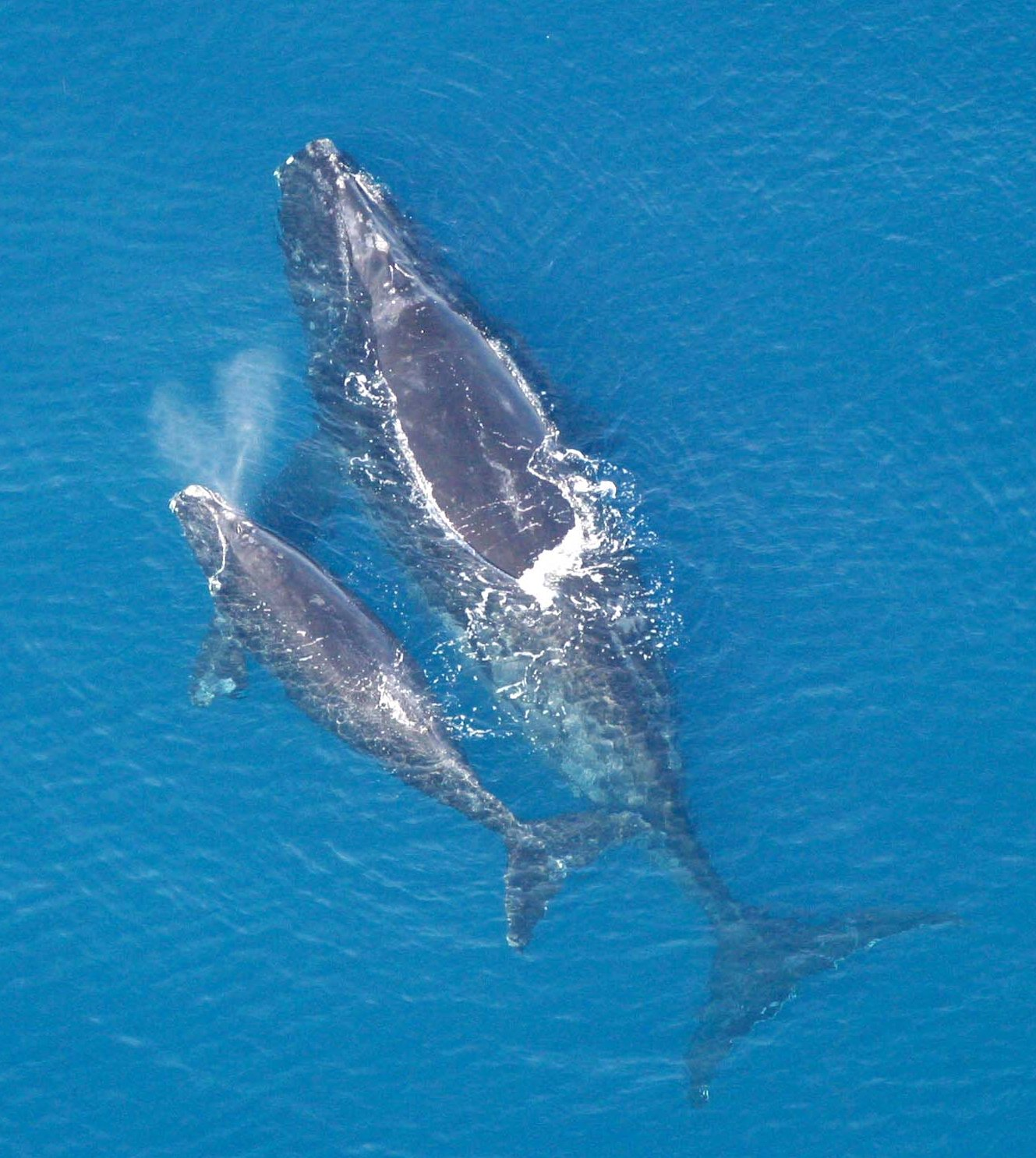
North Atlantic right whale and calf

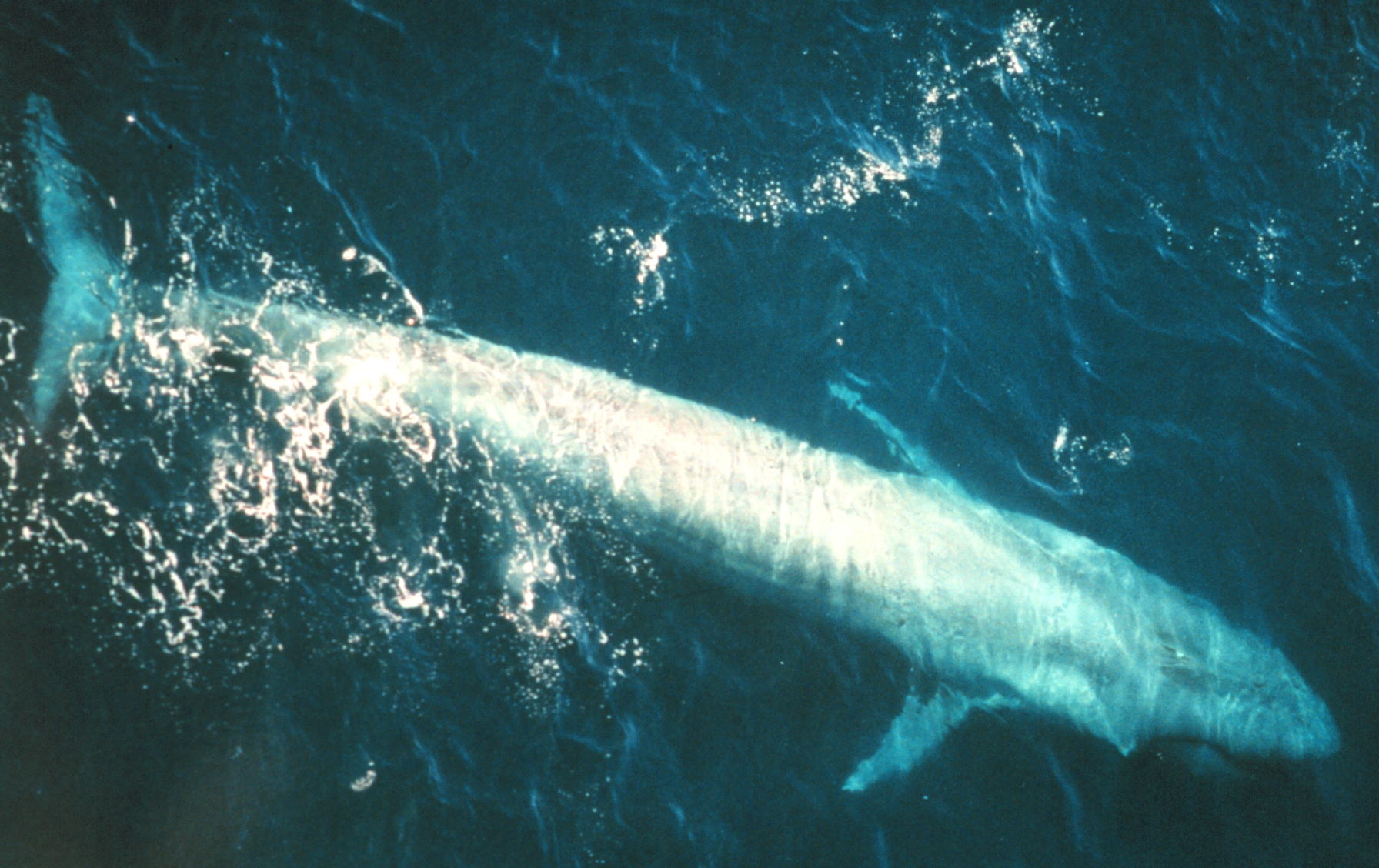
Blue whale

The order Cetacea includes whales, dolphins and porpoises. They are the mammals most fully adapted to aquatic life with a spindle-shaped nearly hairless body, protected by a thick layer of blubber, and forelimbs and tail modified to provide propulsion underwater.

- Suborder: Mysticeti
  - Family: Balaenidae (right whales)
    - Genus: Balaena
      - Bowhead whale, Balaena mysticetus LC
    - Genus: Eubalaena
      - North Atlantic right whale, Eubalaena glacialis CR
  - Family: Balaenopteridae (rorquals)
    - Subfamily: Balaenopterinae
      - Genus: Balaenoptera
        - Common minke whale, Balaenoptera acutorostrata LC
        - Blue whale, Balaenoptera musculus EN
        - Fin whale, Balaenoptera physalus VU
    - Subfamily: Megapterinae
      - Genus: Megaptera
        - Humpback whale, Megaptera novaeangliae LC
- Suborder: Odontoceti
  - Superfamily: Delphinoidea
    - Family: Delphinidae (marine dolphins)
      - Genus: Lagenorhynchus
        - White-beaked dolphin, Lagenorhynchus albirostris LC
      - Genus: Leucopleurus
        - Atlantic white-sided dolphin, Leucopleurus acutus LC
      - Genus: Orcinus
        - Killer whale, Orcinus orca DD
    - Family: Monodontidae (narwhal and beluga)
      - Genus: Monodon
        - Narwhal, Monodon monoceros LC
      - Genus: Delphinapterus
        - Beluga, Delphinapterus leucas LC
    - Family: Ziphiidae (beaked whales)
      - Subfamily: Hyperoodontinae
        - Genus: Hyperoodon
          - Northern bottlenose whale, Hyperoodon ampullatus NT

== Order: Carnivora (carnivorans) ==
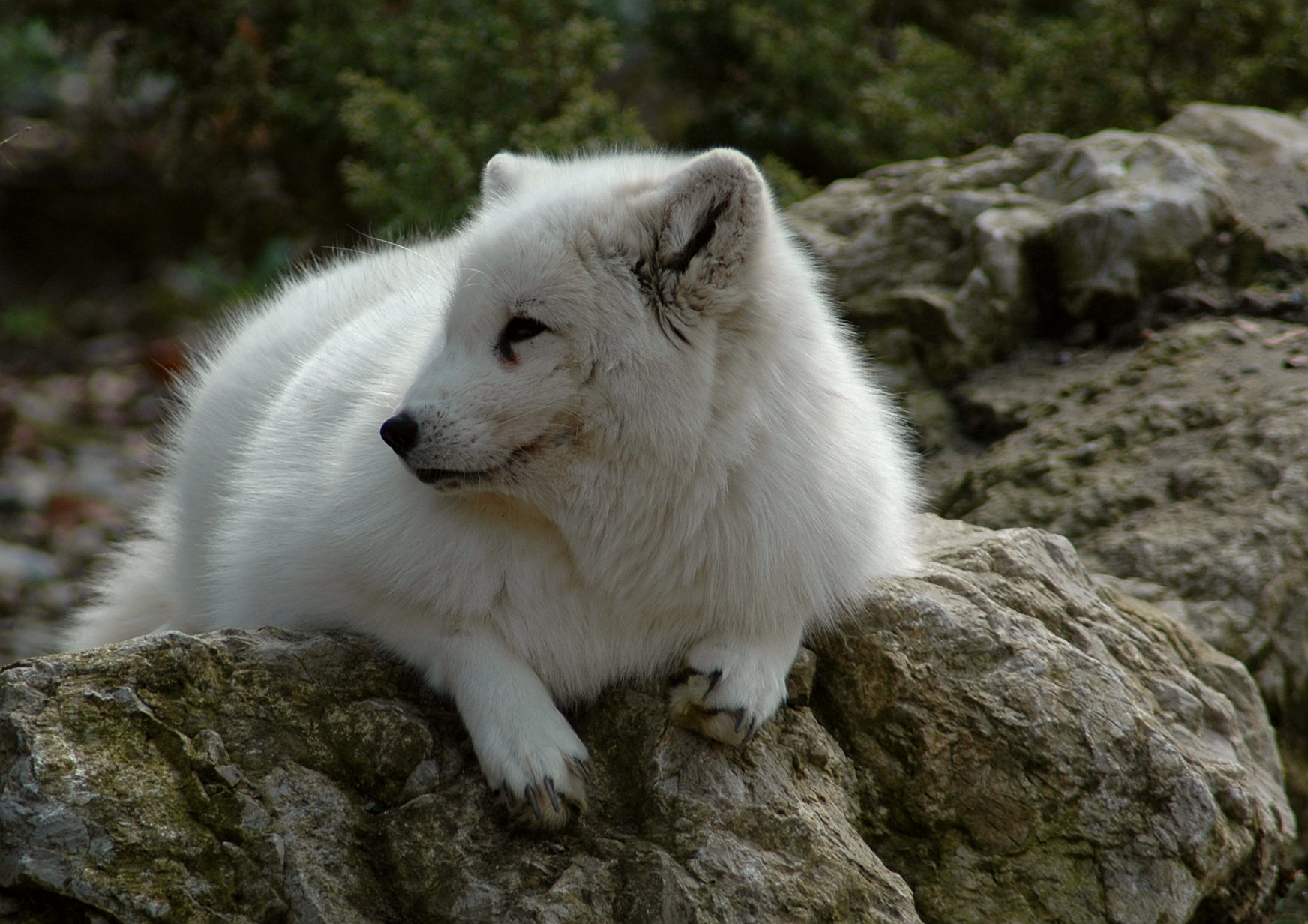
Arctic fox

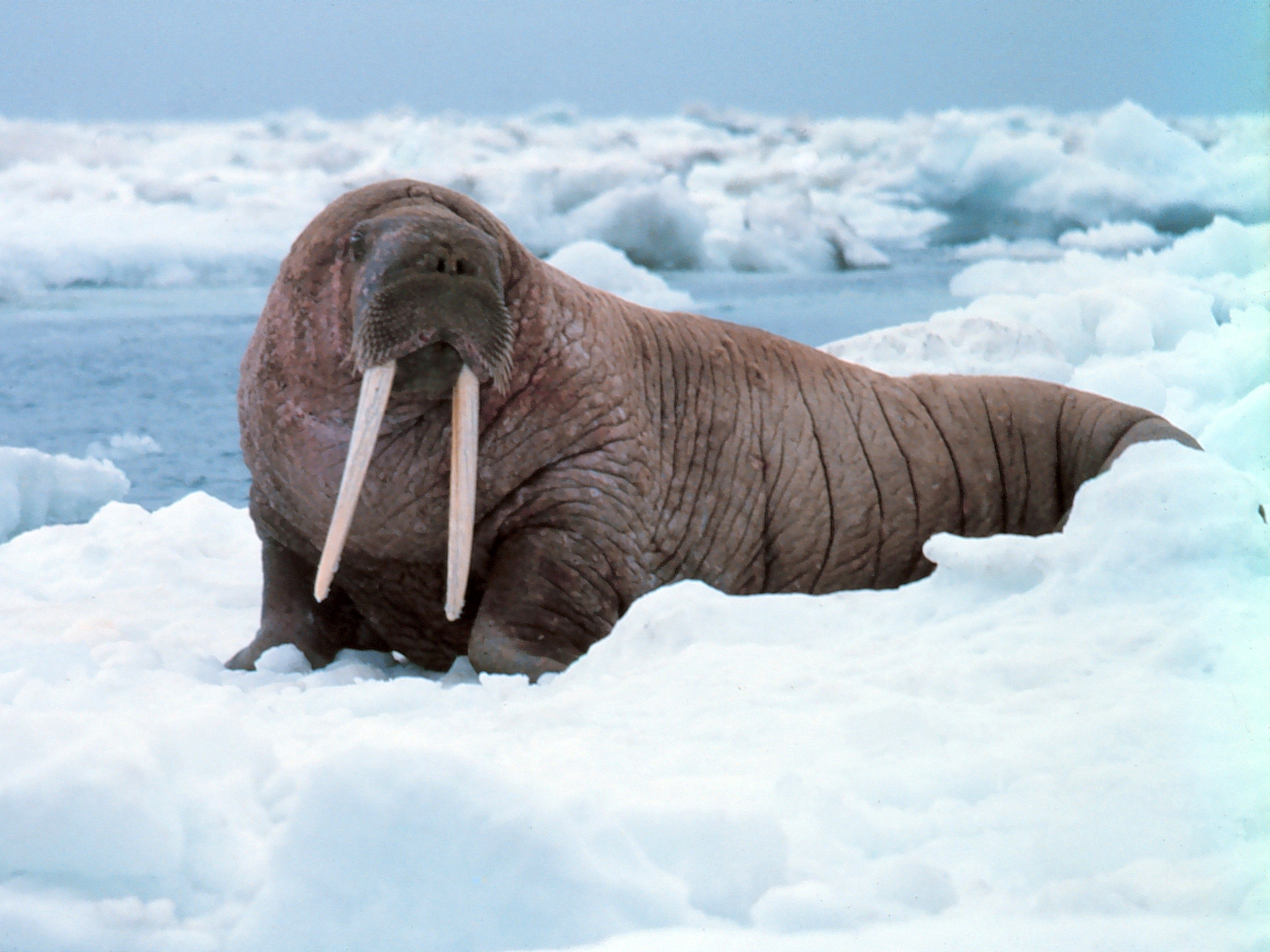
Walrus

There are over 260 species of carnivorans, the majority of which feed primarily on meat. They have a characteristic skull shape and dentition.

- Suborder: Caniformia
  - Family: Canidae (dogs, foxes)
    - Genus: Vulpes
      - Arctic fox, Vulpes lagopus LC
  - Family: Ursidae (bears)
    - Genus: Ursus
      - Polar bear, Ursus maritimus VU
  - Family: Odobenidae
    - Genus: Odobenus
      - Walrus, Odobenus rosmarus VU
  - Family: Phocidae (earless seals)
    - Genus: Cystophora
      - Hooded seal, Cystophora cristata EN
    - Genus: Erignathus
      - Bearded seal, Erignathus barbatus NT
    - Genus: Pagophilus
      - Harp seal, Pagophilus groenlandicus NT
    - Genus: Phoca
      - Harbor seal, Phoca vitulina LC
    - Genus: Pusa
      - Ringed seal, Pusa hispida LC

== Order: Artiodactyla (even-toed ungulates) ==
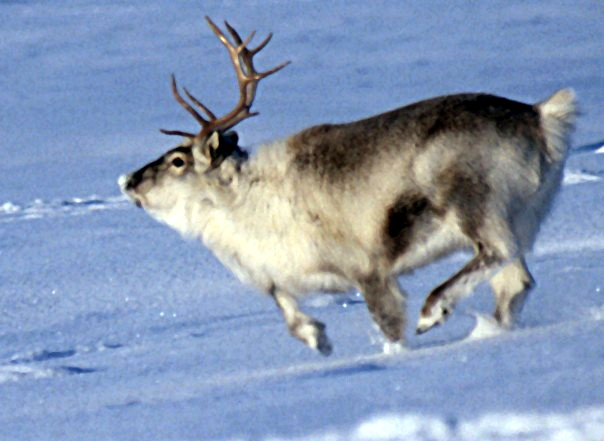
A Svalbard reindeer, an endemic subspecies characterized for its smaller size and shorter legs.

The even-toed ungulates are ungulates whose weight is borne about equally by the third and fourth toes, rather than mostly or entirely by the third as in perissodactyls. There are about 220 artiodactyl species, including many that are of great economic importance to humans.

- Family: Bovidae (cattle, antelope, sheep, goats)
  - Subfamily: Caprinae
    - Genus: Ovibos
      - Muskox, O. moschatus LC introduced, extirpated
- Family: Cervidae (deer)
  - Subfamily: Capreolinae
    - Genus: Rangifer
      - Reindeer, R. tarandus VU
        - Svalbard reindeer, R. t. platyrhynchus

== See also ==
- List of chordate orders
- Lists of mammals by region
- List of prehistoric mammals
- Mammal classification
- List of mammals described in the 2000s
