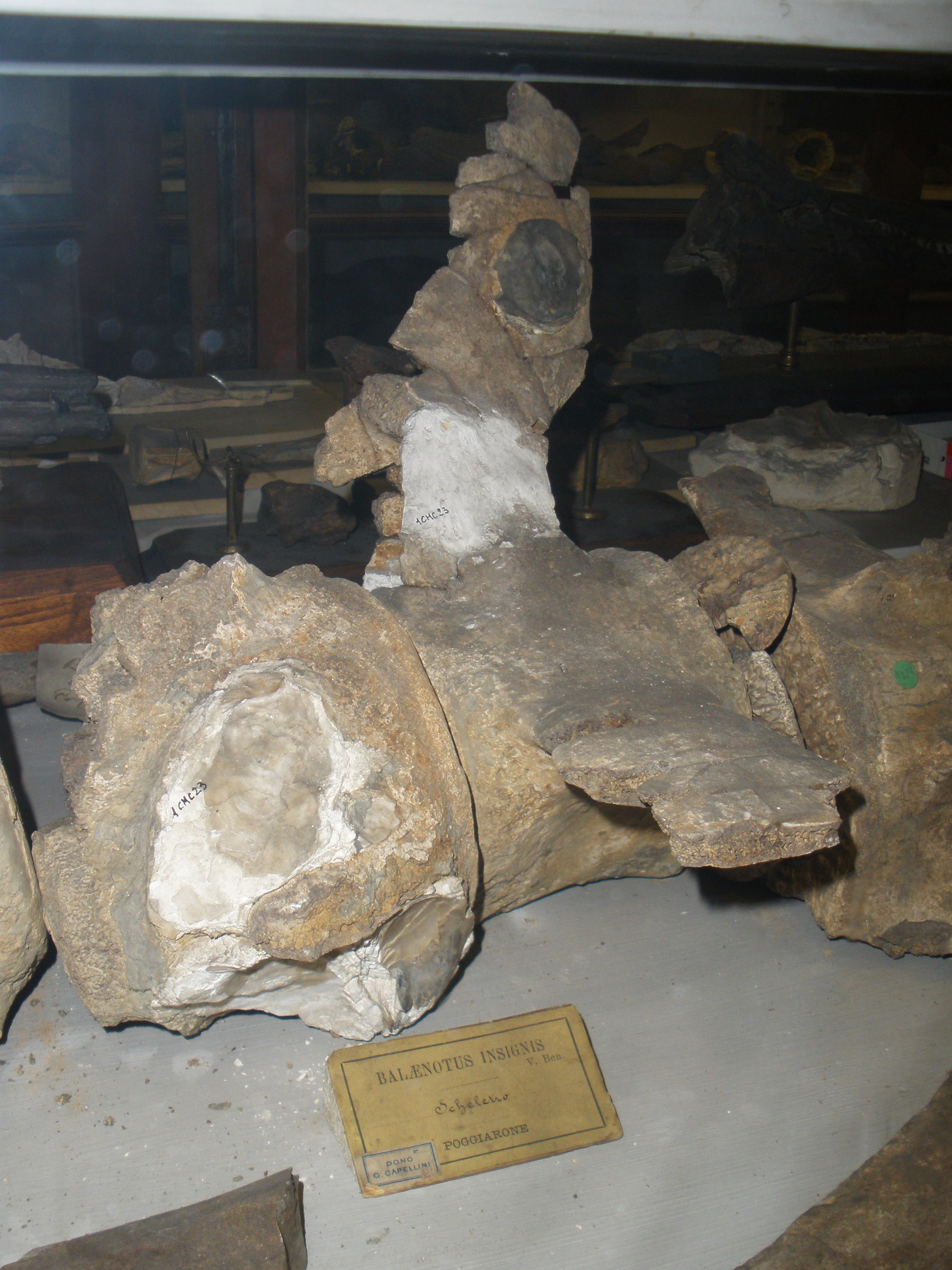
- Balaenotus insignis vertebra

Scientific classification
- Domain: Eukaryota
- Kingdom: Animalia
- Phylum: Chordata
- Class: Mammalia
- Order: Artiodactyla
- Infraorder: Cetacea
- Family: Balaenidae
- Genus: †Balaenotus; Van Beneden, 1872

Species
- †B. insignis Van Beneden 1872 (Type)

= Balaenotus =

Balaenotus Temporal range: Pliocene

Extinct genus of cetaceans

Balaenotus is an extinct genus of cetaceans from the Pliocene of Belgium.

== Classification ==
Balaenotus is known only from the type species B. insignis.
