= Balaenella =

Balaenella Temporal range: early Pliocene

Scientific classification
- Kingdom: Animalia
- Phylum: Chordata
- Class: Mammalia
- Infraclass: Placentalia
- Order: Artiodactyla
- Infraorder: Cetacea
- Family: Balaenidae
- Genus: †Balaenella; Bisconti, 2005

Species
- †B. brachyrhynus Bisconti, 2005 (type)

Extinct genus of mammals

Balaenella is an extinct genus of balaenid whale known from the early Pliocene of what is now Antwerp, Belgium. The type species is Balaena brachyrhynus.

== Classification ==
A cladistic analysis of Balaenidae places Balaenella as the sister taxon of the modern bowhead whale in a clade separate from right whales.

== Palaeobiology ==
A partial skull attributed to B. brachyrhynus from the Kattendijk Formation shows evidence of bite marks made by a bluntnose sixgill shark. It is hypothesized that these bite marks may have occurred on an upside-down, floating carcass, which could indicate a scavenging event.
