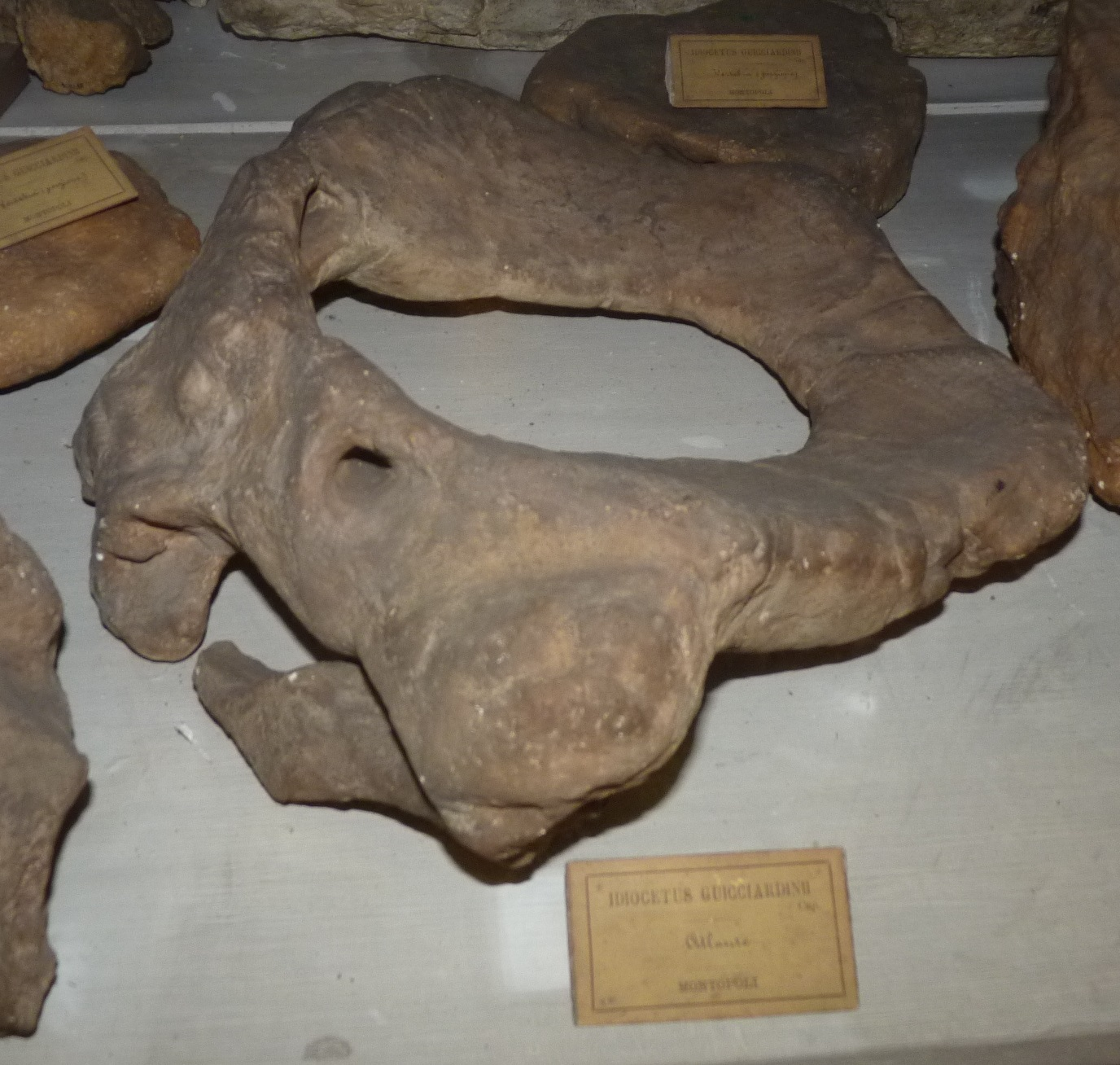
- Atlas of I. guicciardinii, from Italy

Scientific classification
- Kingdom: Animalia
- Phylum: Chordata
- Class: Mammalia
- Infraclass: Placentalia
- Order: Artiodactyla
- Infraorder: Cetacea
- Family: Balaenidae
- Genus: †Idiocetus; Capellini 1876

Species
- I. guicciardinii Capellini 1876

= Idiocetus =

Idiocetus Temporal range: Tortonian–Piacenzian

Extinct genus of mammals

Idiocetus ("unique whale") is a genus of extinct cetaceans of the family Balaenidae.

== Discovery ==
Fossils belonging to this genus were first found in Piacenzian (Upper Pliocene) strata near Montopoli in Val d'Arno, a town in Tuscany (central Italy). The Italian paleontologist Giovanni Capellini described the whale in 1876 and attributed it to a new genus and species, establishing the type species Idiocetus guicciardinii. Some decades later, in 1926, other fossil remains possibly belonging to the genus were discovered from the Tortonian (Upper Miocene) of Japan.
