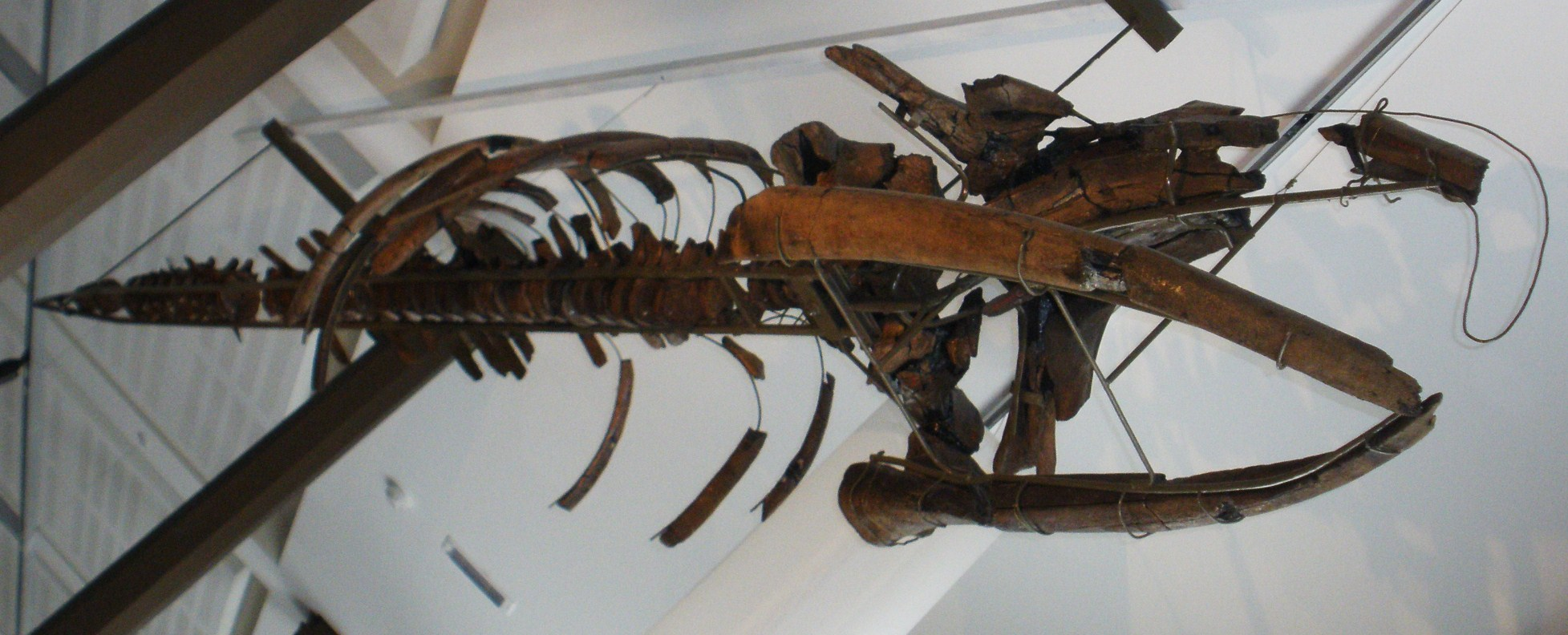
- Balaenula balaenopsis holotype skeleton

Scientific classification
- Kingdom: Animalia
- Phylum: Chordata
- Class: Mammalia
- Order: Artiodactyla
- Infraorder: Cetacea
- Family: Balaenidae
- Genus: †Balaenula van Beneden, 1872

Type species
- Balaenula balaenopsis van Beneden, 1872

Species
- †Balaenula balaenopsis Van Beneden, 1872 (Type); †Balaenula astensis Trevisan, 1942 (from Italy)

= Balaenula =

Balaenula Temporal range: Pliocene

Extinct genus of cetaceans

Balaenula is an extinct genus of baleen whale species which lived during the Pliocene epoch of Europe and possibly North America. Balaenula is a small whale measuring within the range of 6–8 metres (20–26 ft) in length.

== Taxonomy ==
Historically, Balaenula has been treated as a wastebasket taxon, so recent taxonomic revisions have resulted in only two named species of Balaenula to be known from the Pliocene epoch in the marine strata of Belgium and Italy, but the recognition of the type specimen as an individual is doubtful.

An unnamed species previously described from Japan has been redescribed as a separate taxon Archaeobalaena dosanko. An unnamed species with most complete specimen is known from the U.S. (as well as the only one on display in North America) was found at Lake Waccamaw, North Carolina in 2008. The whale's skull was excavated from the limestone outcropping by the state's Underwater Archaeology Branch, prepared, and permanently displayed at the Lake Waccamaw Depot Museum starting 2012.
