= Antwerpibalaena =

Antwerpibalaena Temporal range: Pliocene

Scientific classification
- Kingdom: Animalia
- Phylum: Chordata
- Class: Mammalia
- Infraclass: Placentalia
- Order: Artiodactyla
- Infraorder: Cetacea
- Family: Balaenidae
- Genus: †Antwerpibalaena
- Species: †A. liberatlas

Binomial name
- †Antwerpibalaena liberatlas De Lavigerie et al., 2020

Antwerpibalaena is an extinct genus of balaenid that lived during the Pliocene epoch.

== Distribution ==
Antwerpibalaena liberatlas fossils are known from Belgium.
