= Charadrobalaena =

Charadrobalaena Temporal range: Early Pliocene

Scientific classification
- Kingdom: Animalia
- Phylum: Chordata
- Class: Mammalia
- Infraclass: Placentalia
- Order: Artiodactyla
- Infraorder: Cetacea
- Family: Balaenidae
- Genus: †Charadrobalaena
- Species: †C. valentinae

Binomial name
- †Charadrobalaena valentinae Bisconti et al., 2023

Extinct genus of balaenid baleen whale

Charadrobalaena is an extinct monotypic genus of balaenid baleen whale that lived during the Zanclean stage of the Pliocene epoch.

== Etymology ==
The generic name Charadrobalaena derives from charadra, meaning gully in Greek, and balaena, meaning whale in Latin. The specific epithet of the type species, Charadrobalaena valentinae is in reference to the nickname "Valentina" that was given to the type specimen.
