= Archaeobalaena =

Archaeobalaena Temporal range: Zanclean

Scientific classification
- Kingdom: Animalia
- Phylum: Chordata
- Class: Mammalia
- Infraclass: Placentalia
- Order: Artiodactyla
- Infraorder: Cetacea
- Family: Balaenidae
- Genus: †Archaeobalaena
- Species: †A. dosanko

Binomial name
- †Archaeobalaena dosanko Tanaka et al., 2020

Extinct genus of whales

Archaeobalaena is an extinct genus of balaenid whale that lived during the Zanclean stage of the Pliocene epoch.

== Distribution ==
Archaeobalaena dosanko is known from fossils found in the Chippubetsu Formation of Japan.
