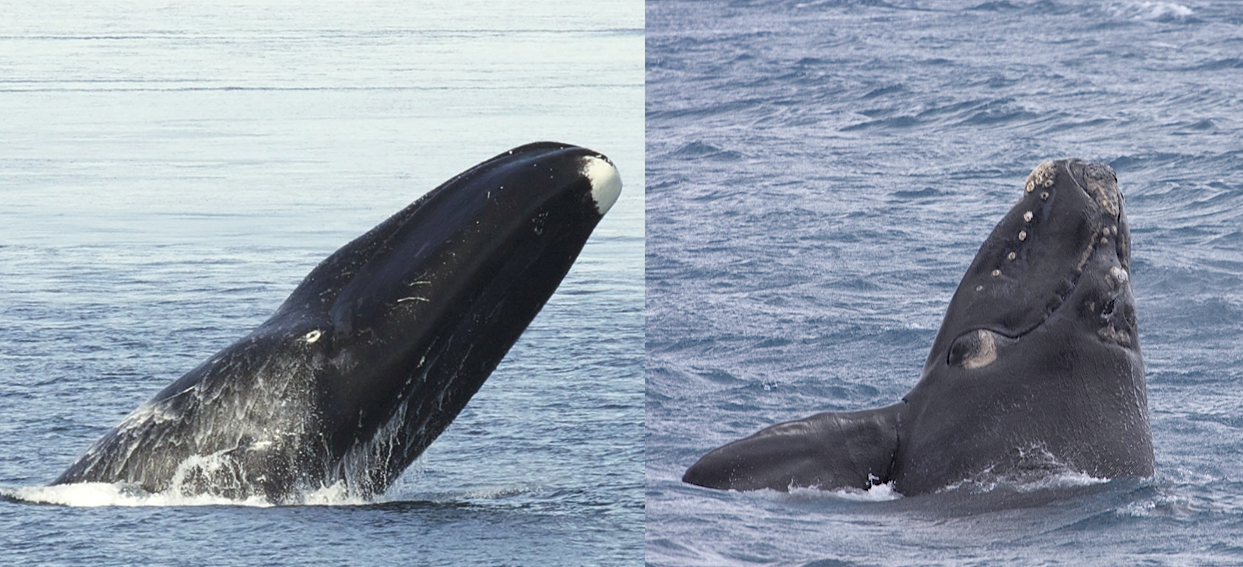
- Montage of two extant balaenids, Balaena mysticetus (right) and Eubalaena australis (left)

Scientific classification
- Kingdom: Animalia
- Phylum: Chordata
- Class: Mammalia
- Order: Artiodactyla
- Infraorder: Cetacea
- Parvorder: Mysticeti
- Family: Balaenidae; Gray, 1821

Type genus
- Balaena Linnaeus, 1758

Genera
- Balaena; Eubalaena †Antwerpibalaena †Archaeobalaena †Balaenella †Balaenula †Balaenotus †Charadrobalaena †Idiocetus †Megabalaena †Mesoteras †Morenocetus †Peripolocetus †Protobalaena †Quasibalaena

= Balaenidae =

Balaenidae Temporal range: Miocene to present

Family of mammals

Balaenidae (/bəˈlɛnɪdeɪ, -diː/) is a family of whales of the parvorder Mysticeti (baleen whales) that contains mostly fossil taxa and two living genera: the right whale (genus Eubalaena), and the closely related bowhead whale (genus Balaena).

== Taxonomy ==
- Family Balaenidae
  - Genus Balaena
    - Bowhead whale, Balaena mysticetus
  - Genus Eubalaena
    - North Atlantic right whale, Eubalaena glacialis
    - North Pacific right whale, Eubalaena japonica
    - Southern right whale, Eubalaena australis

Until recently, all right whales of the genus Eubalaena were considered a single species—E. glacialis. In 2000, genetic studies of right whales from the different ocean basins led scientists to conclude that the populations in the North Atlantic, North Pacific and Southern Hemisphere constitute three distinct species. Further genetic analysis in 2005 using mitochondrial DNA and nuclear DNA has supported the conclusion that the three populations should be treated as separate species, and the separation has been adopted for management purposes by the U.S. National Marine Fisheries Service and the International Whaling Commission.

The cladogram is a tool for visualizing and comparing the evolutionary relationships between taxa. The point where a node branches off is analogous to an evolutionary branching – the diagram can be read left-to-right, much like a timeline. The following cladogram of the family Balaenidae serves to illustrate the current scientific consensus as to the relationships between the North Pacific right whale and the other members of its family:

- Balaenidae
  - Balaena (bowhead whales)
    B. mysticetus bowhead whale
  - Eubalaena (right whales)
    - E. glacialis North Atlantic right whale
    - - E. japonica North Pacific right whale
      - E. australis Southern right whale

=== Evolutionary history ===
Baleen whales belong to a monophyletic lineage of Mysticeti. Mysticeti are large filter-feeding cetaceans that also include some of the largest animals on earth as well as some of the most critically endangered. Based on morphology and molecular data, four extant family-level clades are recognized within Mysticeti: Balaenidae (bowhead and right whales), Neobalaenidae (pygmy right whales), Eschirichtiidae (gray whales), and Balaenopteridae (rorquals). Phylogenetic relationships of the mysticeti order remain unclear due to legal and logistical challenges. However, recent morphological analysis, support Balaenidae as a monophyletic group that is the sister group to Neobalaenidae.

== Description ==
Size of the southern right whale compared to an average human

Balaenids are large whales, with an average adult length of 15 to 17 metres (45–50 feet), and weighing 50-80 tonnes. Their principle distinguishing feature is their narrow, arched, upper jaw, which gives the animals a deeply curved jawline. This shape allows for especially long baleen plates. The animals utilise these by ram feeding, swimming at or near the surface with their mouth open for minutes at a time, and straining food from the water, which they then scrape off the baleen with their tongues – a feeding method that contrasts with those of the rorquals and the gray whale. Their diet consists of small crustaceans, primarily copepods, although some species also eat a significant amount of krill. Similarities in terms of physical appearances of jawlines and usages between balaenidae and flamingo have been pointed as a result of possible convergent evolution.

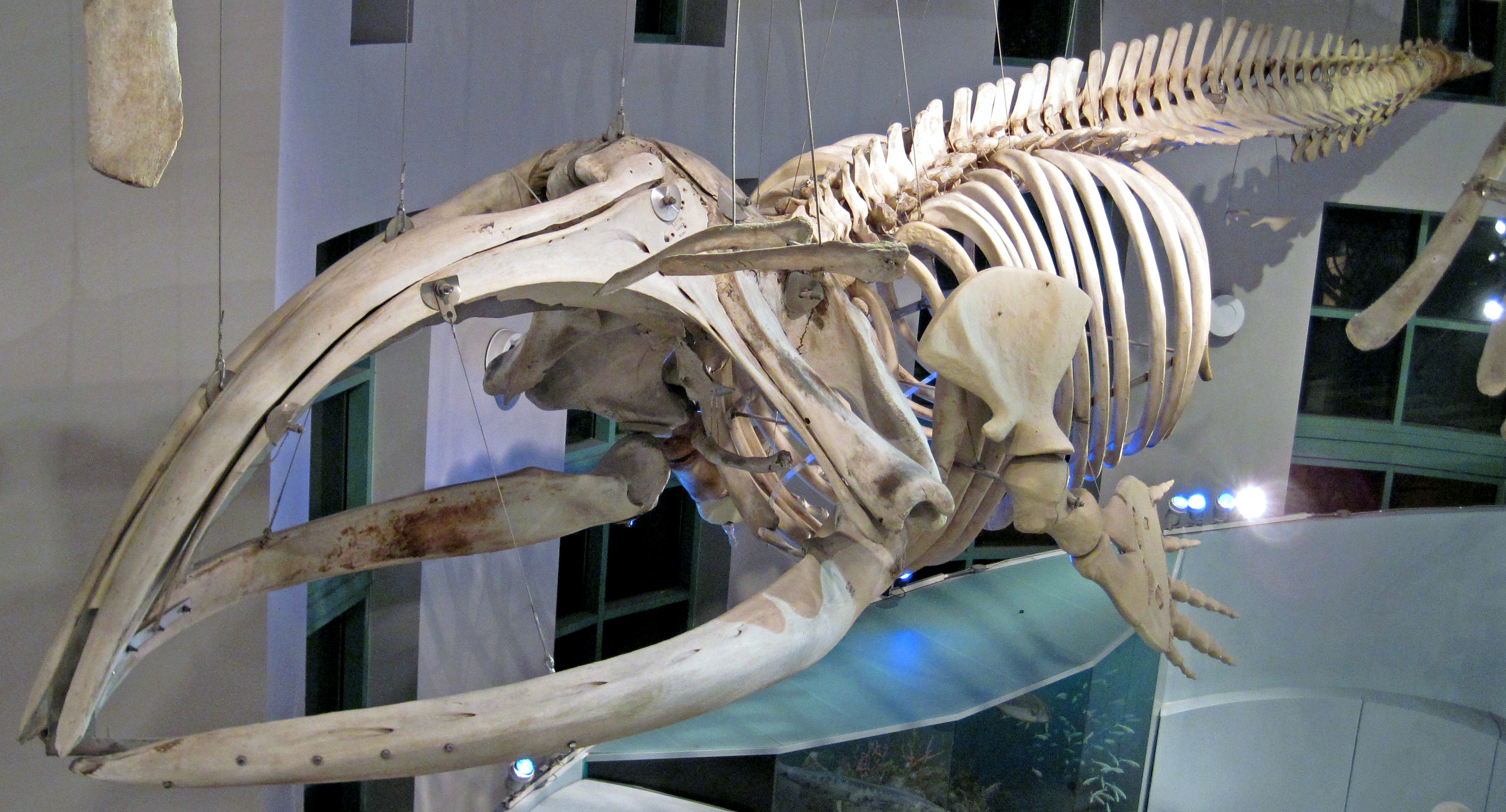
Skull and skeleton of the North Atlantic right whale

Balaenids are also robustly built by comparison with the rorquals, and lack the grooves along the throat that are distinctive of those animals. They have exceptionally large heads in comparison with their bodies, reaching 40% of the total length in the case of the bowhead whale. They have short, broad, flippers, and lack a dorsal fin.

All species are at least somewhat migratory, moving into warmer waters during the winter, during which they both mate and give birth. Gestation lasts 10–11 months, results in the birth of a single young, and typically occurs once every three years.

== Distribution ==
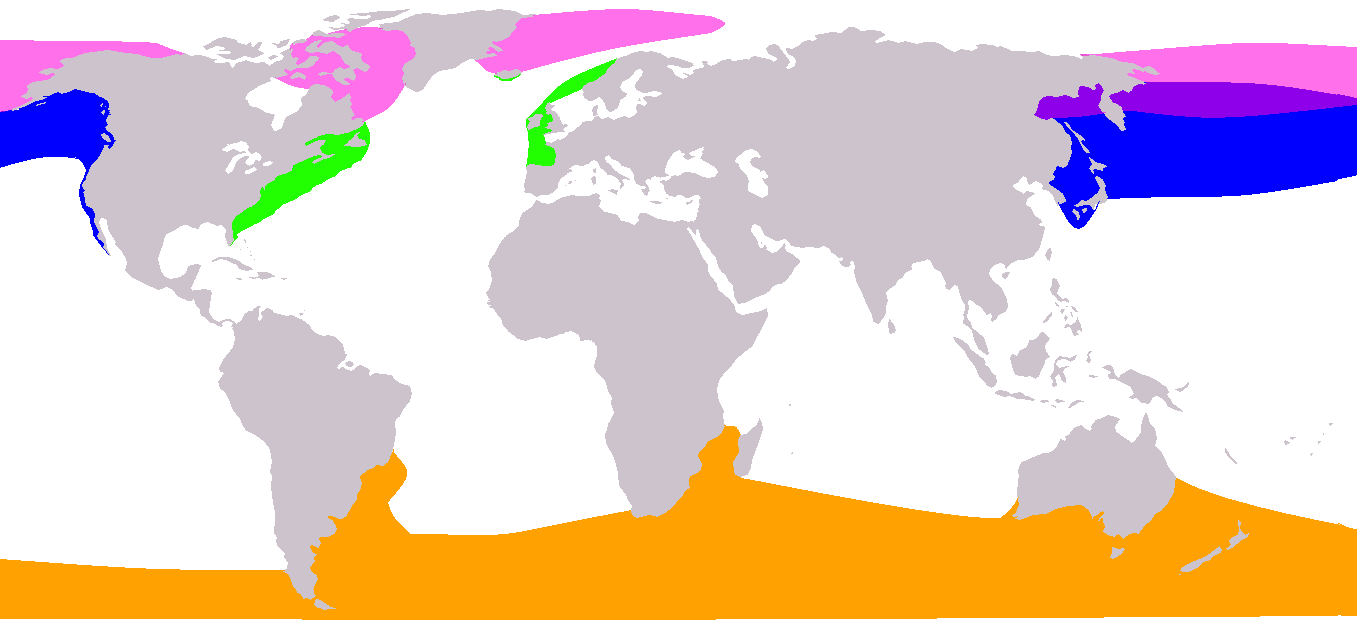
Range of Balaenidae species

The four species of the Balaenidae are found in temperate and polar waters; Eubalaena glacialis (North Atlantic right whale), Eubalaena japonica (North Pacific right whale), Eubalaena australis (southern right whale), and Balaena mysticetus (bowhead whale). Bowhead and right whales can reach up to 18 meters in length and over 100 tons at maturity.

== Exploitation and conservation status ==
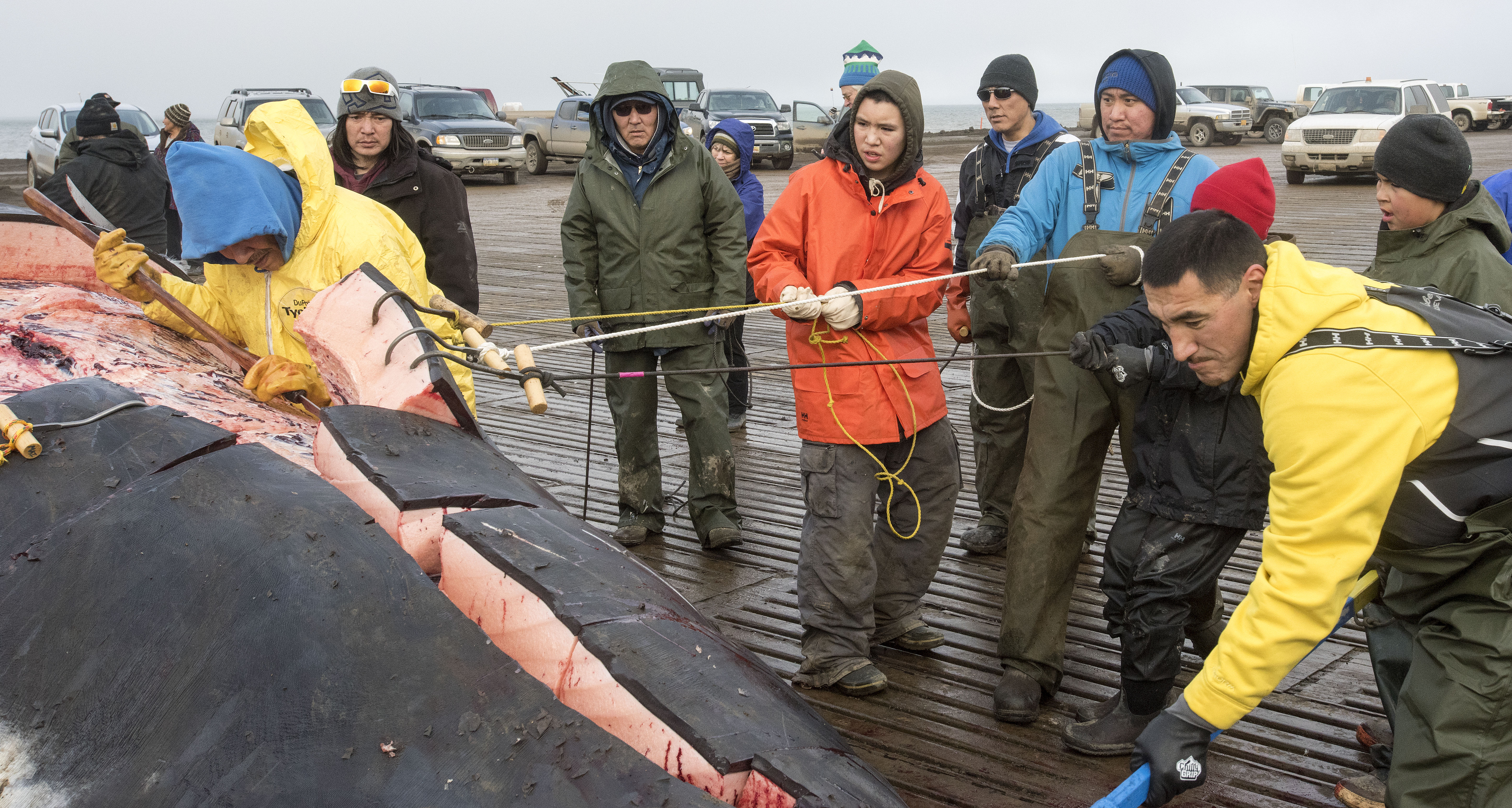
Iñupiat in the process of flensing a bowhead whale, Alaska

Members of Balaenidae can live over 70 years and were hunted extensively in the late 1800s for their blubber. Approximately 40% of right whales' body mass is blubber, and thus they were known as the "right" whale to kill.

After death, the large blubber deposits caused right whales to float to the surface, which facilitated an easier oil harvest. With a population estimated at between 300-350 individuals, the North Atlantic right whale is the most critically endangered great whale. The Northern Pacific right whale is also endangered with only about 500 individuals extant. The Southern right whale (~7500 individuals in 1997) and the Bowhead whale (20,000 to 40,000) have made stronger recoveries since whale hunting was significantly curtailed by international agreement.
