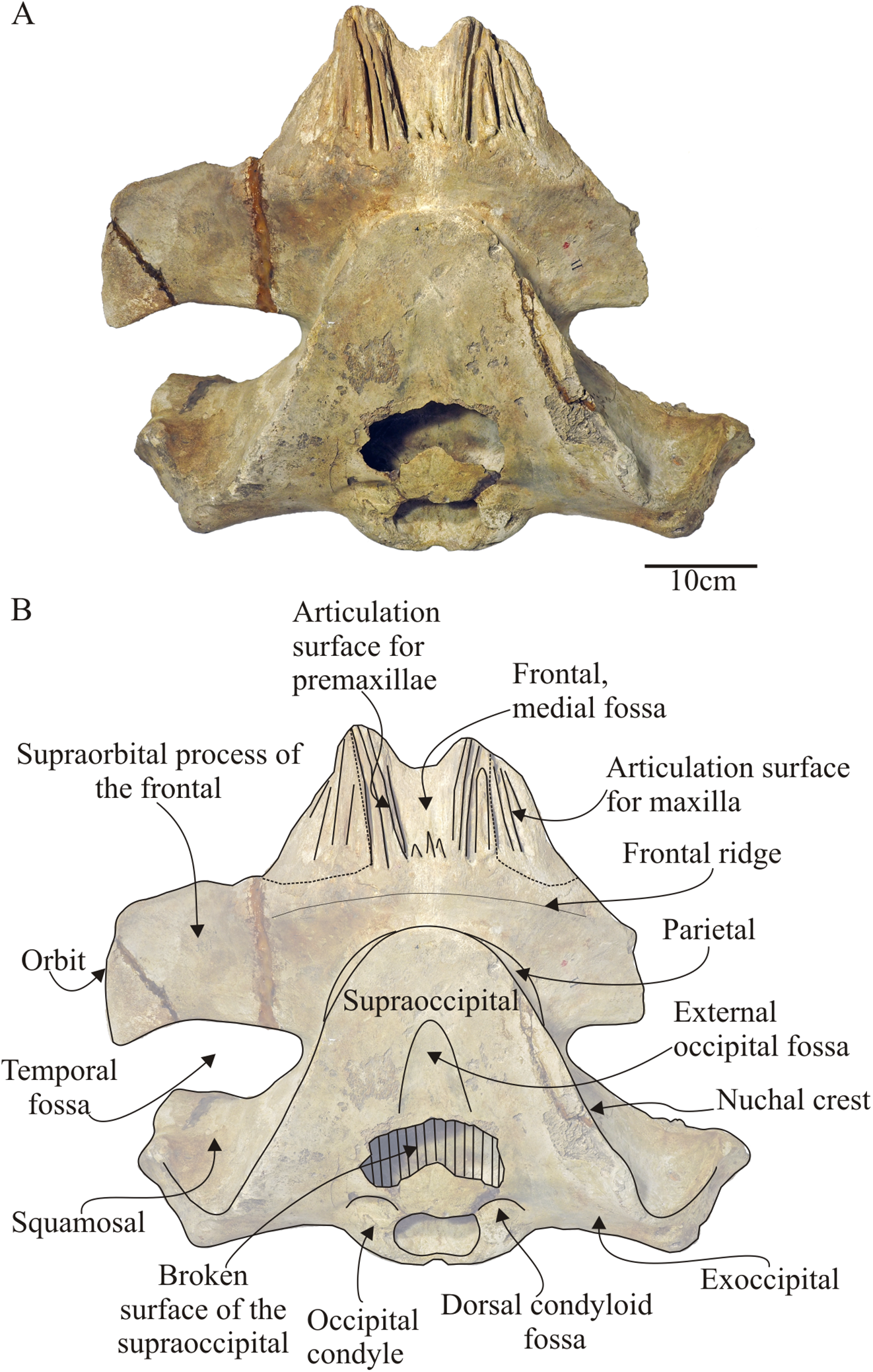
- Holotype cranium

Scientific classification
- Kingdom: Animalia
- Phylum: Chordata
- Class: Mammalia
- Order: Artiodactyla
- Infraorder: Cetacea
- Family: Balaenidae
- Genus: †Morenocetus; Cabrera 1926

Species
- †M. parvus Cabrera 1926 (type)

= Morenocetus =

Morenocetus Temporal range: Early Miocene (Colhuehuapian) ~20–16 Ma

Extinct genus of whale-like animals

Morenocetus is an extinct genus of primitive balaenid from the Early Miocene (Burdigalian and Colhuehuapian in the SALMA classification) Gaiman Formation of Patagonia, Argentina.

== Description ==
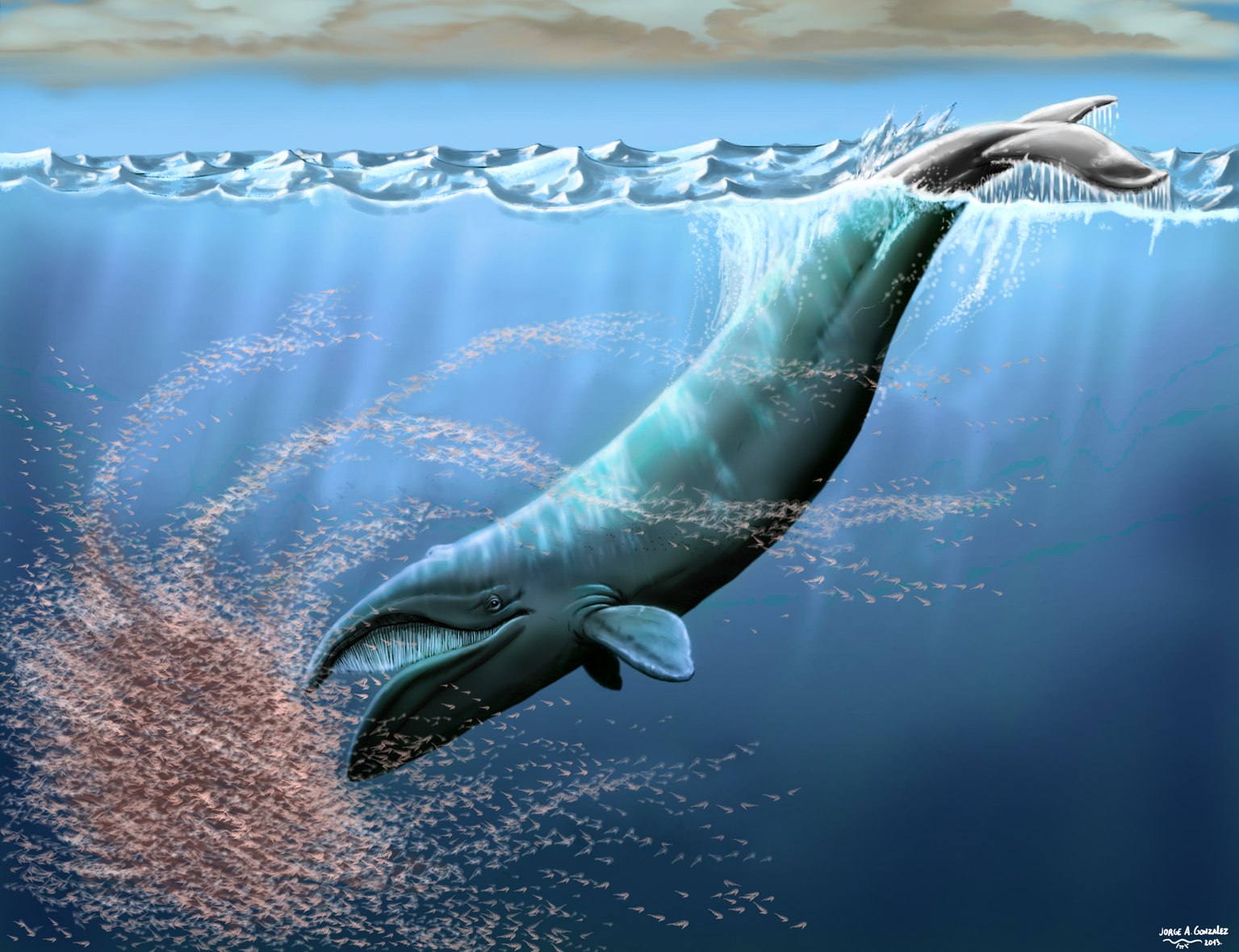
Life restoration

Morenocetus is distinguished from more derived balaenids in the narrow exposure of the squamosal lateral to the exoccipital, a short supraorbital process of the frontal, straight lateral edges of the supraoccipital, and a postorbital process of the frontal oriented posteriorly. It can be distinguished from the only other Miocene balaenid, Peripolocetus in having a dorsoventrally expanded zygomatic process of the squamosal. The body length of Morenocetus is estimated at 5.2–5.6 metres (17–18 ft), and the rostrum is moderately arched dorsoventrally in contrast to crown Balaenidae.

== Classification ==
Morenocetus is the oldest named extinct balaenid so far, although a chaeomysticete specimen from late Oligocene marine deposits in New Zealand was reported as a stem-balaenid in an SVP 2002 abstract by Ewan Fordyce.
