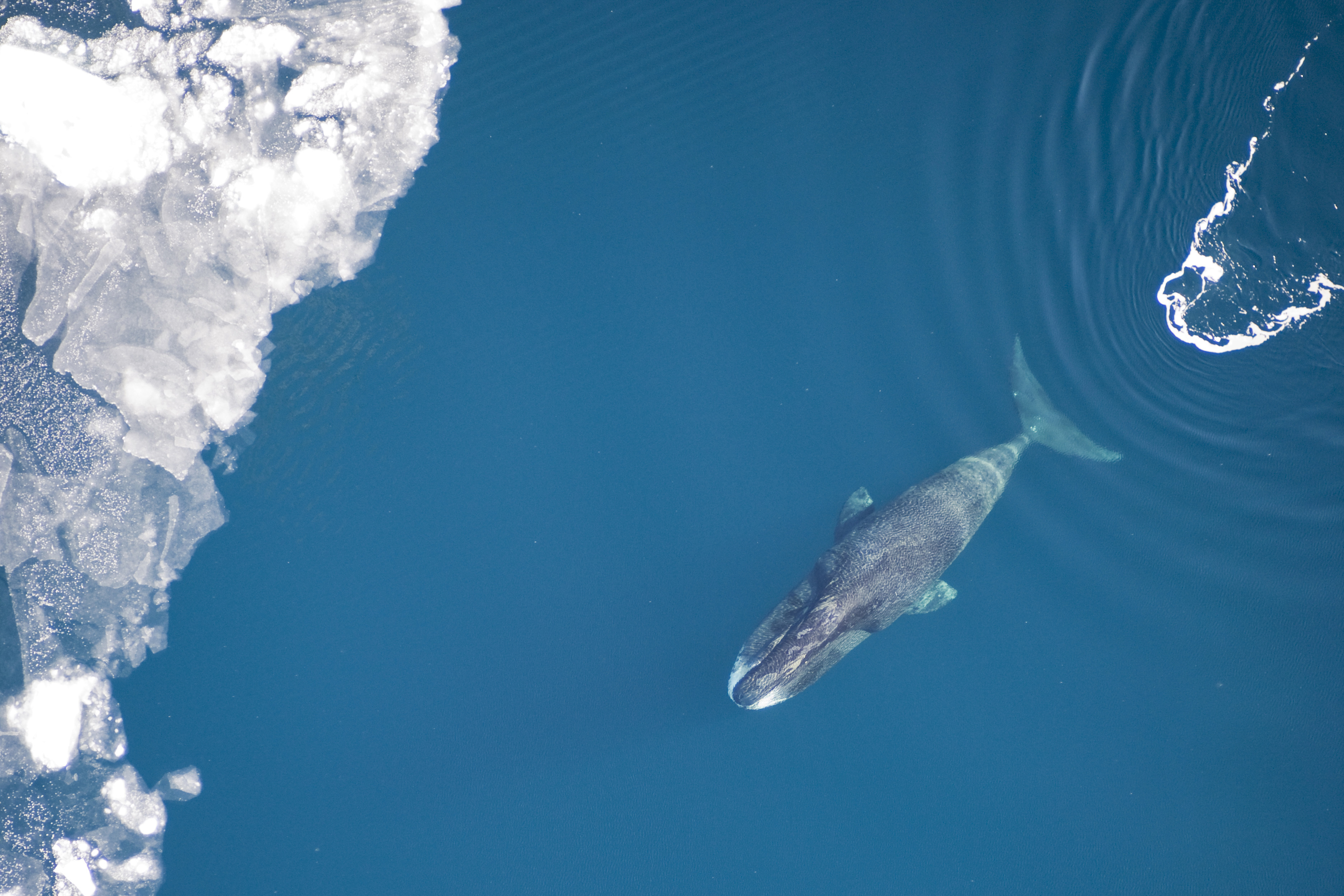

- Size compared to an average human

Conservation status
- Least Concern (IUCN 3.1)

- Vulnerable (NatureServe)
- CITES Appendix I

Scientific classification
- Kingdom: Animalia
- Phylum: Chordata
- Class: Mammalia
- Order: Artiodactyla
- Infraorder: Cetacea
- Family: Balaenidae
- Genus: Balaena
- Species: B. mysticetus

Binomial name
- Balaena mysticetus Linnaeus, 1758
- Bowhead whale range

= Bowhead whale =

Bowhead whale Temporal range: 8–0 Ma Late Miocene to recent

Baleen whale endemic to the Arctic

The bowhead whale (Balaena mysticetus), sometimes known as the Greenland right whale, Arctic whale, and polar whale, is a species of baleen whale belonging to the family Balaenidae and is the only living representative of the genus Balaena. It is the only baleen whale endemic to the Arctic and subarctic waters, and is named after its characteristic massive triangular skull, which it uses to break through Arctic ice.

Bowheads have the largest mouth of any animal, representing almost one-third of the length of the body. They also have the longest baleen plates among whales, with a maximum length of 2.97 to 5.2 metres (9.7 to 17.1 ft). They may be the longest-lived of all mammals, with the ability to reach an age of more than 200 years.

The bowhead was an early whaling target. Their population was severely reduced before a 1966 moratorium was passed to protect the species. Of the five stocks of bowhead populations, three are listed as endangered, one as vulnerable, and one as lower risk, conservation dependent according to the IUCN Red List. The global population is assessed as of least concern.

== Taxonomy ==
Carl Linnaeus named this species in the tenth edition of his Systema Naturae (1758). It was seemingly identical to its relatives in the North Atlantic, North Pacific, and Southern Oceans, and as such they were all thought to be a single species, collectively known as the "right whale", and given the binomial name Balaena mysticetus.

Today, the bowhead whale occupies a monotypic genus, separate from the right whales, as proposed by the work of John Edward Gray in 1821. For the next 180 years, the family Balaenidae was the subject of great taxonometric debate. Authorities have repeatedly recategorized the three populations of right whale plus the bowhead whale, as one, two, three or four species, either in a single genus or in two separate genera. Eventually, it was recognized that bowheads and right whales were different, but there was still no strong consensus as to whether they shared a single genus or two. As recently as 1998, Dale Rice listed just two species – B. glacialis (the right whales) and B. mysticetus (the bowheads) – in his comprehensive and otherwise authoritative classification.

Studies in the 2000s finally provided clear evidence that the three living right whale species comprise a phylogenetic lineage, distinct from the bowhead, and that the bowhead and the right whales are rightly classified into two separate genera. The right whales were thus confirmed to be in a separate genus, Eubalaena. The relationship is shown in the cladogram below:

Family Balaenidae

- Balaenidae
  - Eubalaena (right whales)
    - E. glacialis (North Atlantic right whale)
    - - E. japonica (North Pacific right whale)
      - E. australis (Southern right whale)
  - Balaena (bowhead whales)
    B. mysticetus (bowhead whale)

The bowhead whale, genus Balaena, in the family Balaenidae (extant taxa only)

The earlier fossil record shows no related cetacean after Morenocetus, found in a South American deposit dating back 23 million years.

An unknown species of right whale, the so-called "Swedenborg whale", which was proposed by Emanuel Swedenborg in the 18th century, was once thought to be a North Atlantic right whale. Based on later DNA analysis, those fossil bones claimed to be from Swedenborg whales were confirmed to be from bowhead whales.

== Description ==
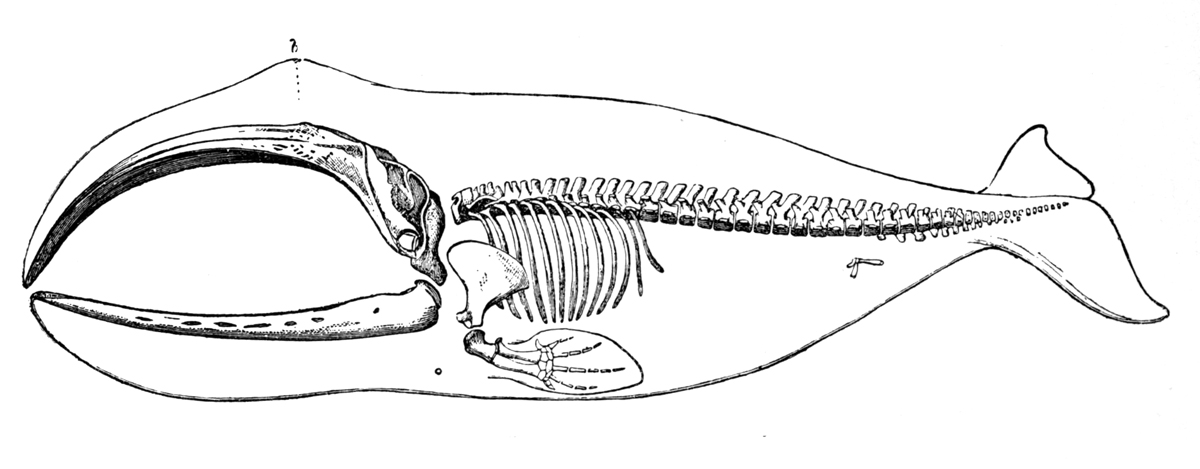
Skeleton of a bowhead whale

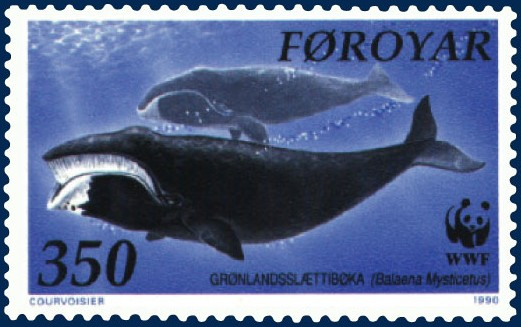
1990 stamp of the Faroe Islands with a drawing depicting a mother and a calf

The bowhead whale is among the largest baleen whale species and is distinguished by its round body with an exceptionally curved rostrum, a large head, and long, dark baleen plates. Relative to its size, the bowhead whale has the largest head of any cetacean, measuring nearly 40% of the total body length. Two blowholes are situated atop its head, and help propel a stream of water up to 6.1 m (20 ft) in the air. The lower lips encompass the baleen racks and resemble a curved circular shape when viewed from the side. It also has wide, trigonal flukes and fairly large, oar-shaped flippers. The skin is mostly black with white patches around the flukes, tail, eyes, and chin. These patches develop throughout life, with the exception of the patch surrounding the chin, which is usually visible in newborn calves, and increases in size at the same rate as the whale's overall growth.

An adult whale usually measures 14 to 18 m (46 to 59 ft) in length and 75 to 100 t (74 to 98 long tons; 83 to 110 short tons) in weight. The fluke of this species measures 2–6 m (6 ft 7 in – 19 ft 8 in) long and the 230 to 360 baleen plates are thought to grow to 4 m (13 ft) long, which is longer than that of any other whale by more than a meter. This species is sexually dimorphic as females usually reach lengths of 16–18 m (52–59 ft), while males average 14–16 m (46–52 ft). There are, however, some specimens that exceed these sizes. In one instance, a female killed off the waters of Pond Inlet in the 1800s allegedly measured 19.5 m (64 ft). Some estimates put the total maximum length higher at about 20 m (66 ft).

A 2013 discovery has clarified the function of the bowhead's large palatal retial organ. The bulbous ridge of highly vascularized tissue, the corpus cavernosum maxillaris, extends along the centre of the hard plate, forming two large lobes at the rostral palate. The tissue is histologically similar to that of the corpus cavernosum of the mammalian penis. This organ is thought to provide a mechanism of cooling for the whale (which is normally protected from the cold Arctic waters by 40 centimetres (16 in) or more of fat). During physical exertion, the whale must cool itself to prevent hyperthermia (and ultimately brain damage). This organ becomes engorged with blood, and as the whale opens its mouth cold seawater flows over the organ, thus cooling the blood.

In one study, the brain size of two males that measured 12 and 13.3 m (39 and 44 ft) in total length, were recorded at 2.072 and 2.280 kilograms (4.57 and 5.03 lb), respectively. With a gyrencephalic index of 2.32, the brains of the two males were found to exhibit extreme gyrification. Compared to other cetaceans, their brain had a lower level of gyrification in the cerebral cortex, more vertically-aligned gyri, and a relatively dull temporal pole region.

The bowhead whale's penis can reach up to 3 m (9.8 ft) in length, and its testicles usually weigh less than 150 kg (330 lb) in adults, but an individual estimated to weigh about 54 t (53 long tons; 60 short tons) had testicles weighing 211 kg (465 lb) and measuring 1.5 m (4.9 ft) in length.

== Behaviour ==
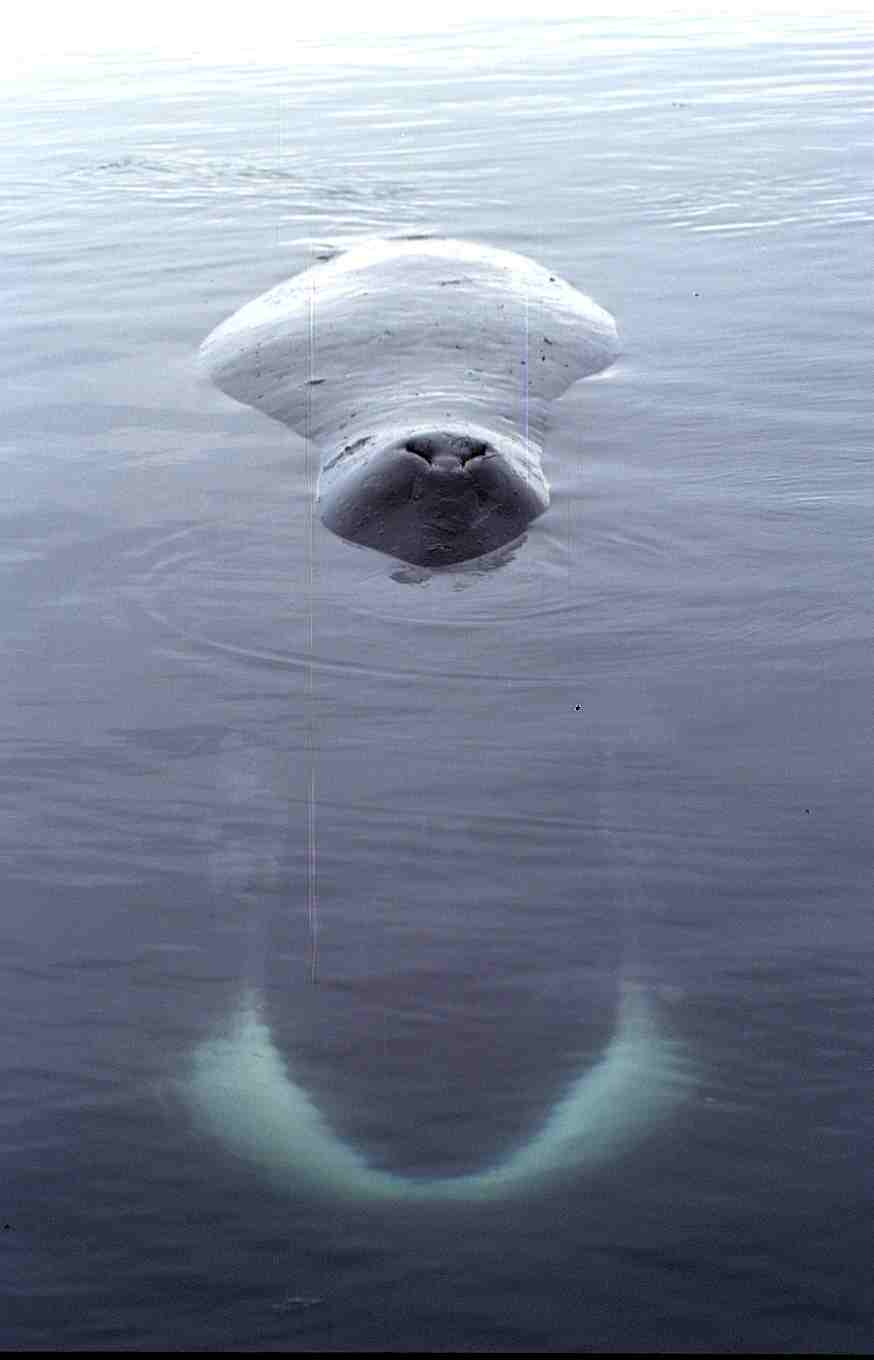
Resting on water surface in Foxe Basin

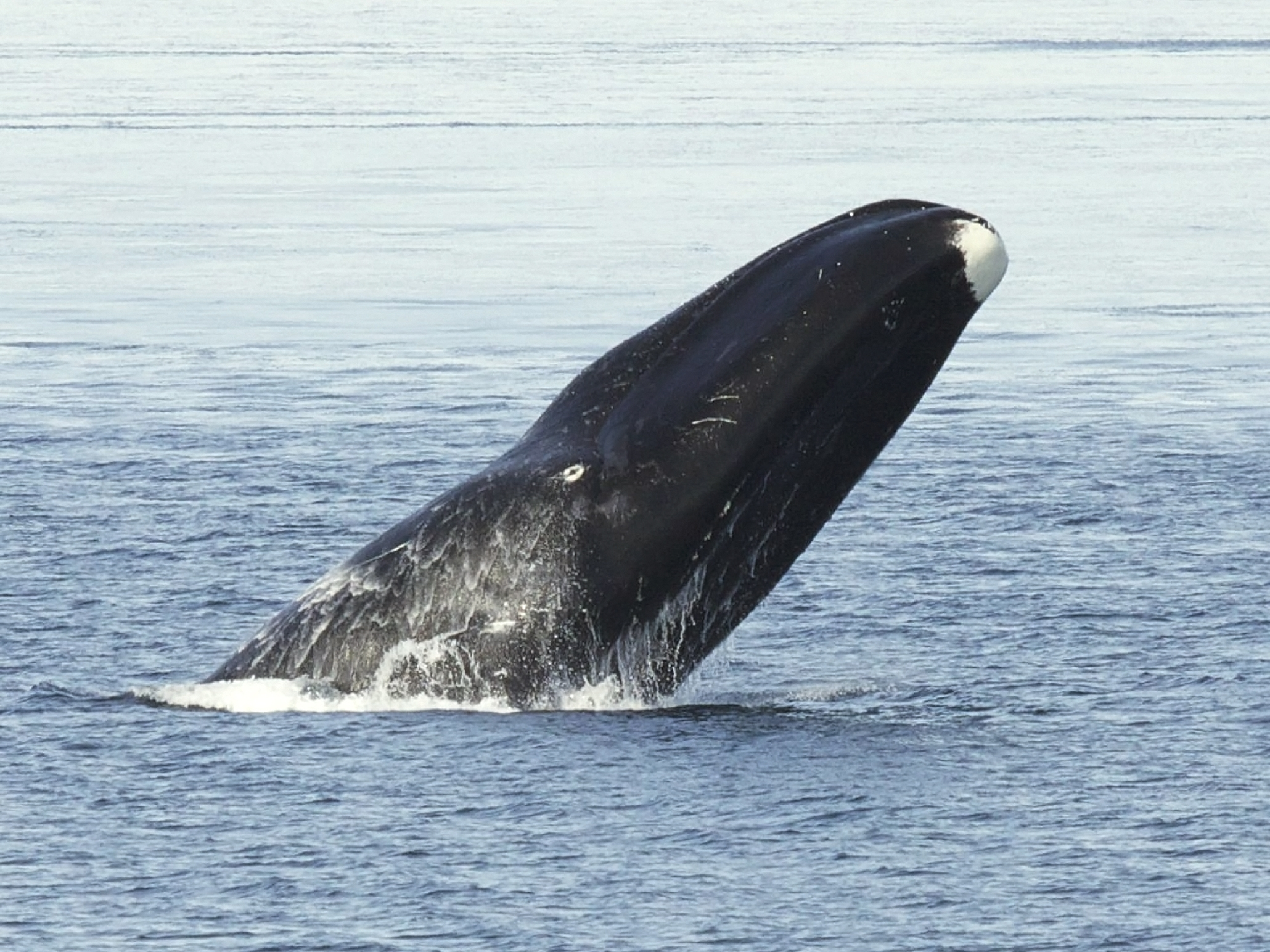
Breaching off Alaskan coast

=== Swimming ===
The bowhead whale typically travels alone or in small pods of up to six. It is able to dive and remain submerged under water for up to an hour. The time spent under water in a single dive is usually limited to 9–18 minutes. The bowhead is not thought to be a deep diver, but can reach a depth down to 150 m (500 ft). It is a slow swimmer, normally travelling around 2 to 5 kilometres per hour (0.56 to 1.39 m/s; 1.2 to 3.1 mph). When fleeing from danger, it can travel at a speed of 10 km/h (2.8 m/s; 6.2 mph). During periods of feeding, the average swim speed is increased to 1.1–2.5 m/s (4.0–9.0 km/h; 2.5–5.6 mph).

=== Feeding ===
The head of the bowhead whale comprises a large portion of its body length, creating an enormous feeding apparatus. The bowhead whale is a filter feeder, and feeds by swimming forward with its mouth wide open. It has hundreds of overlapping baleen plates consisting of keratin hanging from each side of the upper jaw. The mouth has a large, upturning lip on the lower jaw that helps to reinforce and hold the baleen plates within the mouth. This also prevents buckling or breakage of the plates from the pressure of the water passing through them as the whale advances. To feed, water is filtered through the fine hairs of keratin of the baleen plates, trapping the prey inside near the tongue where it is then swallowed. The diet consists of mostly zooplankton, which includes krill, copepods, mysids, amphipods, and many other crustaceans. About 1.8 t (2 short tons) of food are consumed each day. While foraging, bowheads are solitary or occur in groups of two to 10 or more.

=== Vocalization ===
Bowhead whale song.

Bowhead whales are highly vocal and use low frequency (<1000 Hz) sounds to communicate while travelling, feeding, and socialising. Intense calls for communication and navigation are produced especially during migration season. During breeding season, bowheads make long, complex, variable songs for mating calls. Many tens of distinct songs are sung by a population in a single season. From 2010 through to 2014, near Greenland, 184 distinct songs were recorded from a population of around 300 animals.

=== Reproduction ===
Sexual activity occurs between pairs and in boisterous groups of several males and one or two females. Breeding season is observed from March through August; conception is believed to occur primarily in March when song activity is at its highest. Sexual maturity is estimated to be reached at 15–25 years, and physical maturity at 50–60 years. The gestation period is 13–14 months with females producing a calf once every three to four years. There is no evidence of reproductive aging in males, and a case of penile sperm discharge from a male bowhead whale estimated to be 159 years old has been reported. However, there is evidence of possible reproductive aging in female bowhead whales, with females aged 133, 139, and 149 years, respectively, suggesting reproductive cessation or senescence. The oldest female captured with a fetus was estimated to be 121 years old. Lactation typically lasts about a year. Female bowheads may be capable of producing calves for 100 years. To survive in the cold water immediately after birth, calves are born with a thick layer of blubber. Within 30 minutes of birth, bowhead calves are able to swim on their own. A newborn calf is typically 4–4.5 m (13–15 ft) long, weighs roughly 1,000 kg (2,200 lb), and grows to 8.2 m (27 ft) within the first year.

== Health ==
=== Lifespan ===
Bowhead whales are considered to be the longest-living mammals, living for over 200 years. In May 2007, a 15 m (49 ft) specimen caught off the Alaskan coast was discovered with the 89 mm (3.5 in) head of an explosive bomb lance of a model manufactured between 1879 and 1885 lodged in its body, so the whale was probably bomb lanced sometime between those years, and its age at the time of death was estimated at between 115 and 130 years. Spurred by this discovery, scientists measured the ages of other bowhead whales captured between 1978 and 1996; one male specimen was estimated to be 211 years old. Other bowhead whales were estimated to be between 135 and 172 years old. This discovery showed the longevity of the bowhead whale is much greater than originally thought. Researchers at CSIRO, Australia's national science agency, estimated that bowhead whales' maximum natural lifespan is 268 years based on genetic analysis.

=== Genetic benefits ===
A greater number of cells present in an organism was once believed to result in greater chances of mutations that cause age-related diseases and cancer. Although the bowhead whale has thousands of times more cells than other mammals, it has a much higher resistance to cancer and aging. In 2015, scientists from the US and UK were able to successfully map the whale's genome. Through comparative analysis, two alleles that could be responsible for the whale's longevity were identified. These two specific gene mutations linked to the bowhead whale's ability to live longer are the ERCC1 gene and the proliferating cell nuclear antigen (PCNA) gene. ERCC1 is linked to DNA repair and increased cancer resistance. PCNA is also important in DNA repair. These mutations enable bowhead whales to better repair DNA damage, allowing for greater resistance to cancer. The whale's genome may also reveal physiological adaptations such as having low metabolic rates compared to other mammals. Changes in the gene UCP1, a gene involved in thermoregulation, can explain differences in the metabolic rates in cells.

== Ecology ==
=== Range and habitat ===
The bowhead whale is the only baleen whale to spend its entire life in the Arctic and subarctic waters. The Alaskan population spends the winter months in the southwestern Bering Sea. The group migrates northward in the spring, following openings in the ice, into the Chukchi and Beaufort seas. The whale's range varies depending on climate changes and on the forming/melting of ice.

Historically, bowhead whales' range may have been broader and more southerly than currently thought. Bowheads were abundant around Labrador, Newfoundland (Strait of Belle Isle) and the northern Gulf of St Lawrence until at least the 16th and 17th centuries. It is unclear whether this was due to the colder climate during these periods. The distribution of Balaena spp. during the Pleistocene were far more southerly as fossils have been excavated from Italy and North Carolina, thus could have overlapped between those of Eubalaena based on those locations.

=== Population ===
Worldwide, there are an estimated 10,000-25,000 bowhead whales, with a maximum population of 43,000.

Generally, five stocks of bowhead whales are recognized: 1) the Western Arctic stock in the Bering, Chukchi, and Beaufort Seas, 2) the Hudson Bay and Foxe Basin stock, 3) the Baffin Bay and Davis Strait stock, 4) the Sea of Okhotsk stock, and 5) the Svalbard-Barents Sea stock. However, recent evidence suggests that the Hudson Bay and Foxe Basin stock and the Baffin Bay and Davis Strait stock should be considered one stock based on genetics and movements of tagged whales.

==== Western Arctic ====
The Western Arctic bowhead population, also known as the Bering-Chukchi-Beaufort population, has recovered since the commercial harvest of this stock ceased in the early 1900s. A 2019 study estimated that the Western Arctic population was 12,505; although it was lower than the 2011 value of 16,820, the surveyors believed there was no significant decline in 2011–2019 due to the unusual conditions of whale migration and observation in 2019. The yearly growth rate of the Western Arctic bowhead population was 3.7% from 1978 to 2011. These data suggest that the Western Arctic bowhead stock may be near its precommercial whaling level. Migration patterns of this population are being affected by climate change.

Alaskan Natives continue to hunt small numbers of bowhead whales for subsistence purposes. The Alaska Eskimo Whaling Commission co-manages the bowhead subsistence harvest with the National Oceanic and Atmospheric Administration. The Alaskan villages that participate in the bowhead subsistence harvest include Barrow, Point Hope, Point Lay, Wainwright, Nuiqsut, Kaktovik, Gambell, Savoonga, Kivalina, Wales, and Little Diomede. The annual subsistence harvest of the Western Arctic stock has ranged from 14 to 72, amounting to an estimated 0.1-0.5% of the population.

==== Baffin Bay and Davis Strait ====
In March 2008, Canada's Department of Fisheries and Oceans stated the previous estimates in the eastern Arctic had undercounted, with a new estimate of 14,400 animals (range 4,800–43,000). These larger numbers correspond to prewhaling estimates, indicating the population has fully recovered. However, if climate change substantially shrinks sea ice, these whales could be threatened by increased shipping traffic.

The status of other populations is less well known. About 1,200 were off West Greenland in 2006, while the Svalbard population may only number in the tens. However, the numbers have been increasing in recent years.

==== Hudson Bay and Foxe Basin ====
The Hudson Bay – Foxe Basin population is distinct from the Baffin Bay – Davis Strait group. The original population size of this local group is unclear, but possibly about 500 to 600 whales annually summered in the northwestern part of the bay in the 1860s. It is likely that the number of whales that actually inhabit Hudson Bay is much smaller than the total population size of this group, but reports from local indigenous people indicate that this population is increasing over decades. Larger portions of the bay are used for summering, while wintering is on a smaller scale. Some animals winter in Hudson Strait, most notably north of Igloolik Island and north eastern Hudson Bay. Distribution patterns in these regions are affected by the presence of orca, and bowheads can disappear from normal ranges in the presence of atypical numbers of orca. Increased mortality caused by orca attack is a possible outcome of climate change, as reduced ice coverage is expected to result in fewer areas that the bowheads can use for shelter from attack. Whaling grounds in the 19th century stretched from Marble Island to Roes Welcome Sound and to Lyon Inlet and Fisher Strait, and whales still migrate through most of these areas.

Distribution within Hudson Bay is mostly restricted to the northwestern part along with Wager Bay, Repulse Bay, Southampton Island (one of two main known summering areas), Frozen Strait, northern Foxe Basin, and north of Igloolik in summer. Satellite tracking indicates that some portions of the group within the bay do not venture further south than Whale Cove and areas south of Coats and Mansel Islands. Cow – calf pairs and juveniles up to 13.5 m (44 ft) in length make up the majority of summering aggregation in the northern Foxe Basin, while matured males and noncalving females may use the northwestern part of Hudson Bay. Fewer whales also migrate to the west coast of Hudson Bay and Mansel and Ottawa Islands. Bowhead ranges within Hudson Bay are usually considered not to cover southern parts, but at least some whales migrate to locations further south such as Sanikiluaq and Churchill river mouth.

Congregation within Foxe Basin occurs in a well-defined area of 3,700 km^{2} (1,400 sq mi) north of Igloolik Island to Fury and Hecla Strait and Kapuiviit and Gifford Fiord, and into Gulf of Boothia and Prince Regent Inlet. Northward migrating along western Foxe Basin to eastern side of the basin also occurs in spring.

==== Sea of Okhotsk ====
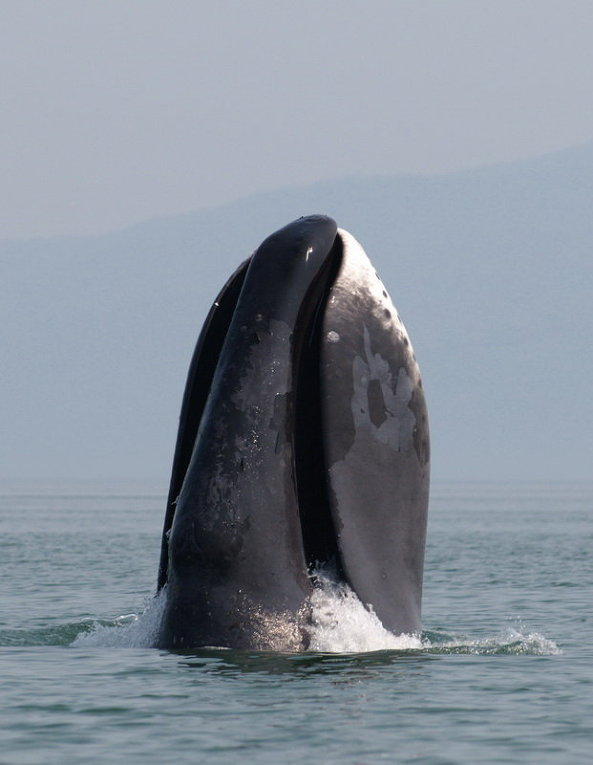
A bowhead whale spyhops in Ulbansky Bay, northwestern Okhotsk Sea

Not much is known about the endangered Sea of Okhotsk population. To learn more about the population, these mammals have been regularly observed near the Shantar Islands, very close to the shore, such as at Ongachan Bay. Several companies provide whale-watching services, which are mostly land-based. According to Russian scientists, this total population likely does not exceed 400 animals. Scientific research on this population was seldom done before 2009, when researchers studying belugas noticed concentrations of bowheads in the study area. Thus, bowheads in the Sea of Okhotsk were once called "forgotten whales" by researchers. The WWF welcomed the creation of a nature sanctuary in the region.

Possibly, vagrants from this population occasionally reach into Asian nations such as off Japan or the Korean Peninsula (although this record might be of a right whale). The first documented report of the species in Japanese waters was of a strayed infant (6.4–7 m (21–23 ft)) caught in Osaka Bay on 23 June 1969, and the first live sighting was of a 10 m (33 ft) juvenile around Shiretoko Peninsula (the southernmost of ice floe range in the Northern Hemisphere) on 21 to 23 June 2015. Fossils have been excavated on Hokkaido, but it is unclear whether the northern coasts of Japan were once included in seasonal or occasional migration ranges.

Genetic studies suggest Okhotsk population share common ancestry with whales in Bering-Chukchi-Beaufort Seas, and repeated mixings had occurred between whales in the two seas.

==== Svalbard-Barents Sea ====
The most endangered but historically largest of all bowhead populations is the Svalbard/Spitsbergen population. Occurring normally in Fram Strait, Barents Sea and Severnaya Zemlya along Kara Sea to Laptev Sea and East Siberian Sea regions, these whales were seen in entire coastal regions in European and Russian Arctic, even reaching to Icelandic and Scandinavian coasts and Jan Mayen in Greenland Sea, and west of Cape Farewell and western Greenland coasts. Also, bowheads in this stock were possibly once abundant in areas adjacent to the White Sea region, where few or no animals currently migrate, such as the Kola and Kanin Peninsula. Today, the number of sightings elsewhere is very small, but with increasing regularities with whales having strong regional connections. Whales have also started approaching townships and inhabited areas such as around Longyearbyen. The waters around the marine mammal sanctuary of Franz Josef Land is possibly functioning as the most important habitat for this population.

It is unclear whether this population is a remnant of the historic Svalbard group, recolonized individuals from other stocks, or if a mixing of these two or more stocks has taken place. In 2015, discoveries of the refuge along eastern Greenland where whaling ships could not reach due to ice floes and largest numbers of whales (80–100 individuals) ever sighted between Spitsbergen and Greenland indicate that more whales than previously considered survived whaling periods, and flows from the other populations are possible.

==== Possible moulting area off Baffin Island ====
During expeditions by a tour operator 'Arctic Kingdom', a large group of bowheads seemingly involved in courtship activities was discovered in very shallow bays south of Qikiqtarjuaq in 2012. Floating skins and rubbing behaviours at sea bottom indicated possible moulting had taken place. Moulting behaviours had never or seldom been documented for this species before. This area is an important habitat for whales that were observed to be relatively active and to interact with humans positively, or to rest on sea floors. These whales belong to Davis Strait stock.

Isabella Bay in Niginganiq National Wildlife Area is the first wildlife sanctuary in the world to be designed specially for bowhead whales. However, moultings have not been recorded in this area due to environmental factors.

=== Predation ===
In 1978 the International Whaling Commission (IWC) introduced a hunting strike quota for the Bering-Chukchi-Beaufort Sea (BCB) bowhead. The quota has remained at 67 strikes per year since 1998 and represents about 0.5 percent of BCB population. The population of bowheads in West Greenland and Canada is estimated to be 6,000 and rising, and hunts in this are minimal (<0.001 percent). Both stocks are rising, and the indigenous hunts seem to be self-sustaining. Orca are also known predators. There is no consensus on the number of deaths by orca. Bowheads seek the ice and shallow waters' safety when threatened by orca. However, there are also cases where bowhead whales have killed attacking orcas by striking their heads with the tip of their tail fins. Inuit have a traditional word for this behavior to give historical context that this is not a new phenomenon. Global warming is increasing the frequency that orca are observed in the far north. A once-rare event, orca are now seen more frequently.

There are no reports of attacks on bowheads by sharks.

== Whaling ==
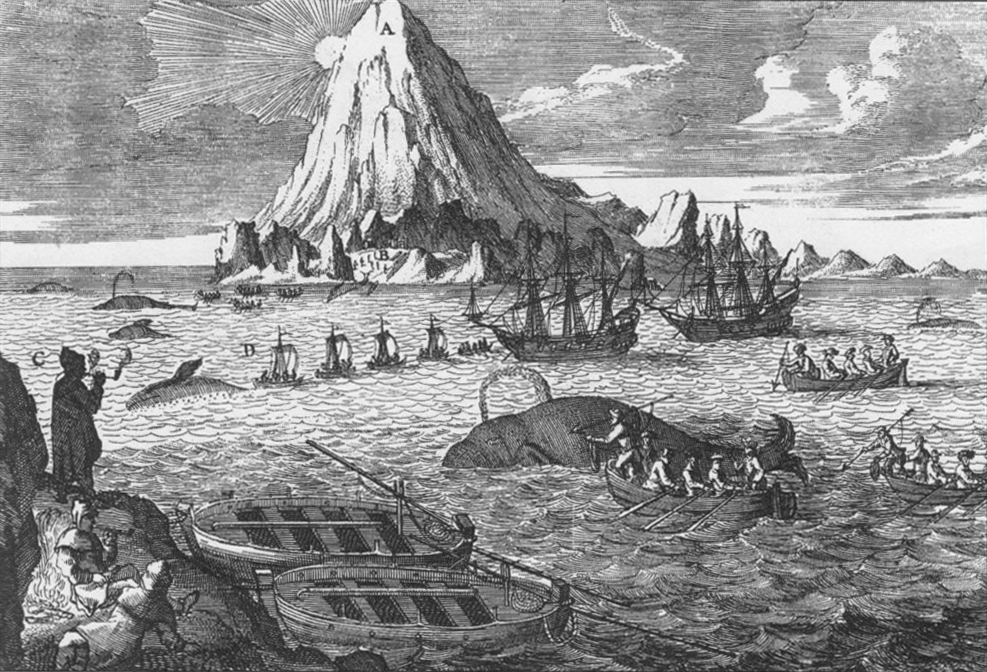
Eighteenth-century engraving showing Dutch whalers hunting bowhead whales in the Arctic

The bowhead whale has been hunted for blubber, meat, oil, bones, and baleen. Like the right whale, it swims slowly, and floats after death, making it ideal for whaling. Before commercial whaling, they were estimated to number 50,000. Paleo-Eskimo sites indicate bowhead whales were eaten in sites from perhaps 4000 BC. Inuit near the Pacific developed specific hunting tools, with the whales providing food and fuel.

Commercial bowhead whaling began in the 16th century when the Basques killed them as they migrated south through the Strait of Belle Isle in the fall and early winter. In 1611, the first whaling expedition sailed to Spitsbergen. The whaling settlement Smeerenburg was founded on Spitsbergen in 1619. By midcentury, the population(s) there had practically been wiped out, forcing whalers to voyage into the "West Ice"—the pack ice off Greenland's east coast. By 1719, they had reached the Davis Strait, and by the first quarter of the 19th century, Baffin Bay.

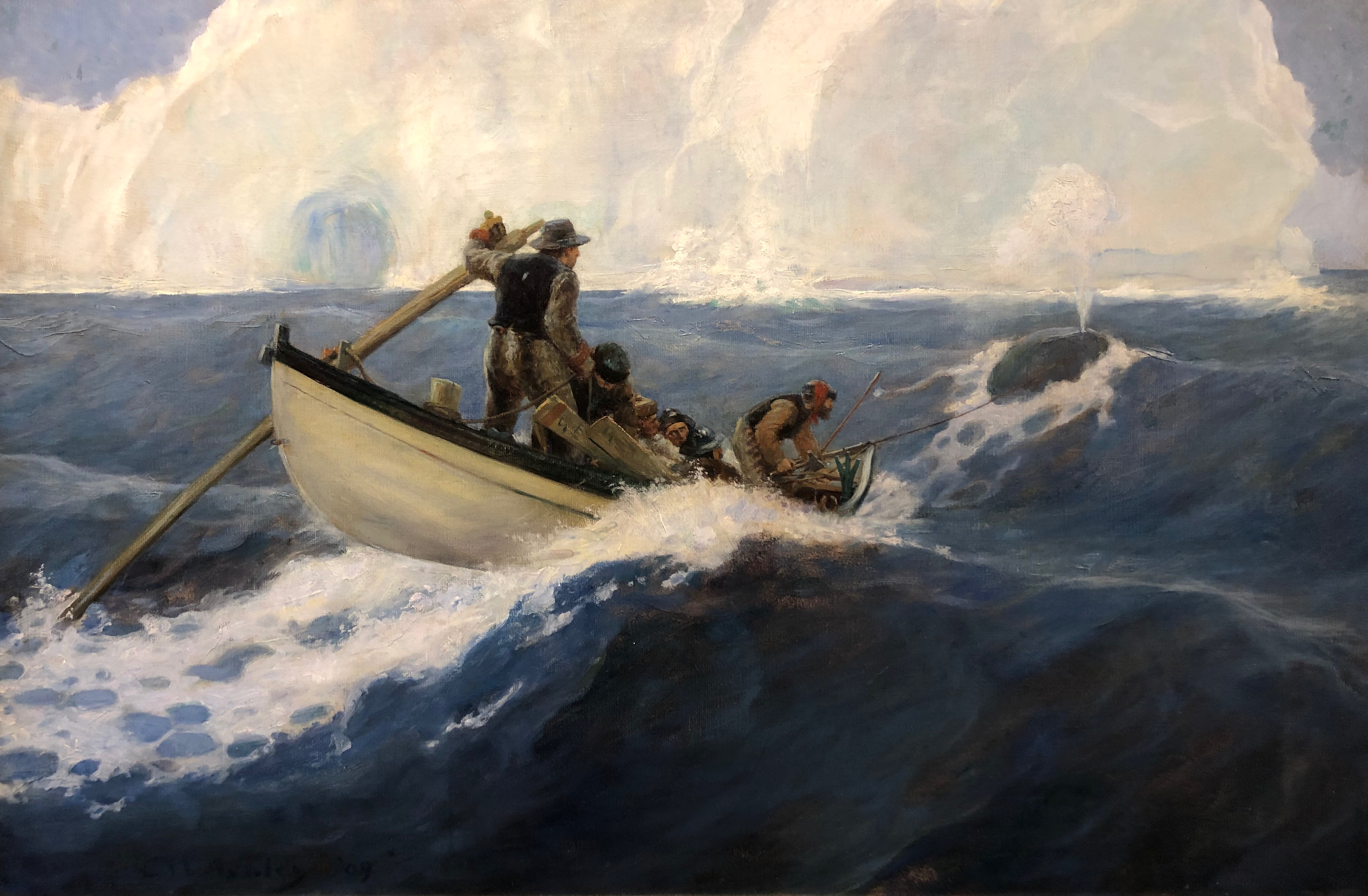
The Chase of the Bowhead Whale (1909) by Clifford Warren Ashley

In the North Pacific, the first bowheads were taken off the eastern coast of Kamchatka by the Danish whaleship Neptun, Captain Thomas Sodring, in 1845. In 1847, the first bowheads were caught in the Sea of Okhotsk, and the following year, Captain Thomas Welcome Roys, in the bark Superior, of Sag Harbor, caught the first bowheads in the Bering Strait region. By 1849, 50 ships were hunting bowheads in each area; in the Bering Strait, 500 whales were killed that year, and that number jumped to more than 2000 in 1850. By 1852, 220 ships were cruising around the Bering Strait region, which killed over 2,600 whales. Between 1854 and 1857, the fleet shifted to the Sea of Okhotsk, where 100–160 ships cruised annually. During 1858–1860, the ships shifted back to the Bering Strait region, where the majority of the fleet cruised during the summer until the early 20th century. An estimated 18,600 bowheads were killed in the Bering Strait region between 1848 and 1914, with 60% of the total being reached within the first two decades. An estimated 18,000 bowheads were killed in the Sea of Okhotsk during 1847–1867, 80% in the first decade.

Bowheads were first taken along the pack ice in the northeastern Sea of Okhotsk, then in Tausk Bay and Northeast Gulf (Shelikhov Gulf). Soon, ships expanded to the west, catching them around Iony Island and then around the Shantar Islands. In the Western Arctic, they mainly caught them in the Anadyr Gulf, the Bering Strait, and around St. Lawrence Island. They later spread to the western Beaufort Sea (1854) and the Mackenzie River delta (1889).

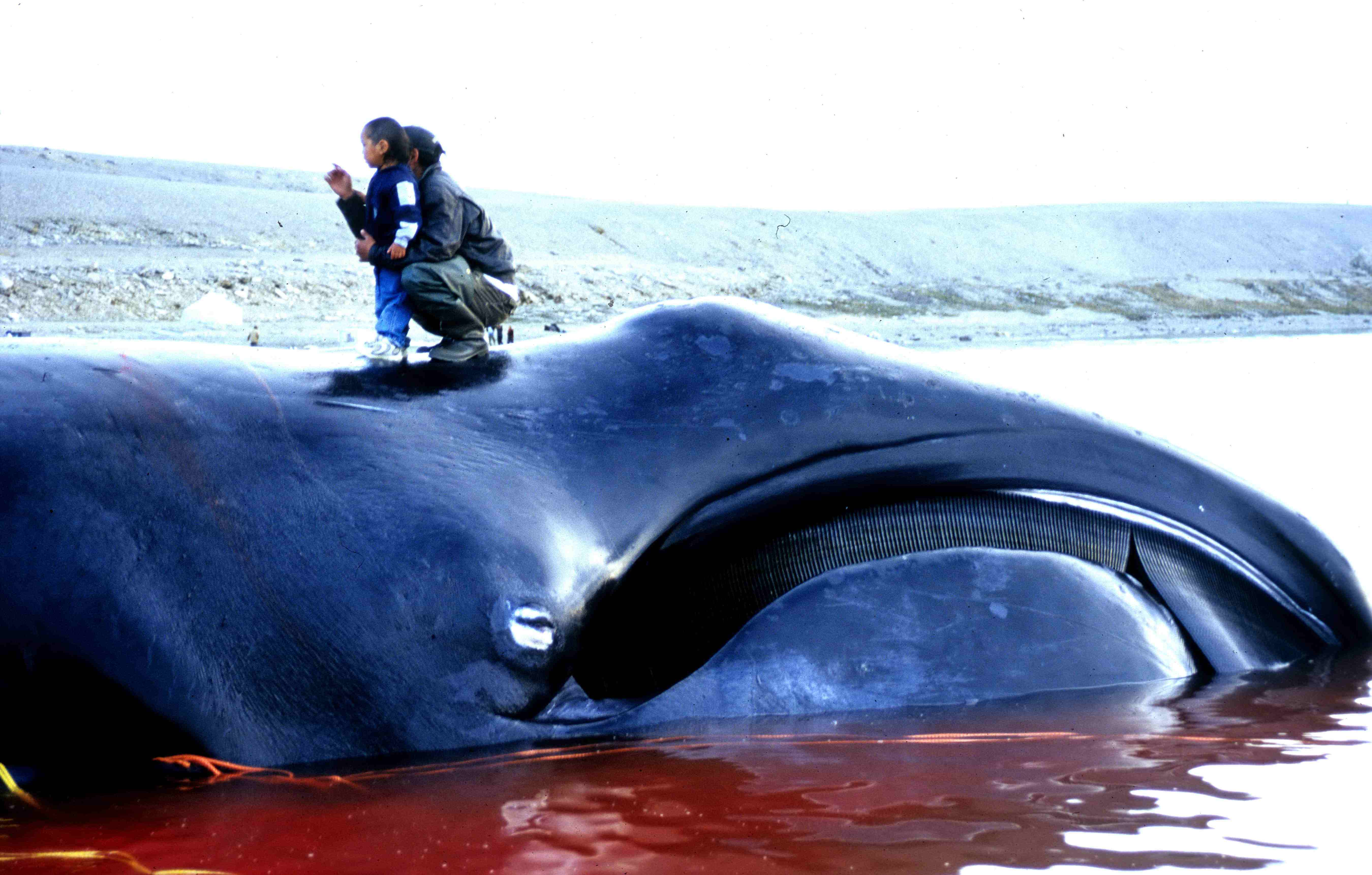
Inuit man and child standing on bowhead whale after a 2002 subsistence hunt

Commercial whaling, the principal cause of the population decline, is over. Bowhead whales are now hunted on a subsistence level by native peoples of North America.

In 2024, the Inuit hunters of Aklavik, Northwest Territories were permitted to hunt and kill one bowhead whale to distribute the whale meat, an important part of Inuit cuisine, to Inuvialuit and Gwich'in communities in the region.

== Conservation ==
The bowhead is listed in Appendix I of CITES. While the global population is thought to be secure, thus assigned least concern status, some populations are listed by the National Marine Fisheries Service as endangered under the auspices of the United States' Endangered Species Act. The IUCN Red List data are:

- Svalbard population – critically endangered
- Sea of Okhotsk subpopulation – endangered
- Baffin Bay-Davis Strait stock – endangered
- Hudson Bay-Foxe Basin stock – vulnerable (estimated to be 1,026 individuals in 2005 by DFO)
- Bering-Chukchi-Beaufort stock – lower risk – conservation dependent

The Alaska Department of Fish and Game and the USA government list the bowhead whale as federally endangered.

The bowhead whale is listed in Appendix I of the Convention on the Conservation of Migratory Species of Wild Animals (CMS), as this species has been categorized as being in danger of extinction throughout all or a significant proportion of its range. CMS Parties strive towards strictly protecting these animals, conserving or restoring the places where they live, mitigating obstacles to migration, and controlling other factors that might endanger them.

== See also ==
- List of cetaceans
- Muktuk

== Cited sources ==
- Burns, J. J.; Montague, J. J.; Cowles, C. J., eds. (1993). The Bowhead Whale. Special Publication No. 2. Lawrence, Kansas: The Society for Marine Mammalogy. ISBN 0-935868-62-3.
