= Peripolocetus =

Peripolocetus Temporal range: Miocene

Scientific classification
- Domain: Eukaryota
- Kingdom: Animalia
- Phylum: Chordata
- Class: Mammalia
- Order: Artiodactyla
- Infraorder: Cetacea
- Family: Balaenidae
- Genus: †Peripolocetus; Kellogg, 1931

Species
- †P. vexillifer Kellogg, 1931 (Type)

Extinct genus of mammals

Peripolocetus is a genus of balaenid baleen whale from the middle Miocene of Kern County, California.

== Classification ==
Like other non-balaenopteroid thalassotheres, Peripolocetus was classified as a cetotheriid in the past. When named by American zoologist Remington Kellogg in 1931, it was assigned to Cetotheriidae, an opinion followed by subsequent authors. However, it was assigned to Mysticeti incertae sedis by one source, and a cladistic analysis of Herpetocetus morrowi recovered Peripolocetus as a member of Balaenoidea. The assignment of Peripolocetus to Balaenoidea was further reinforced by a new specimen from the type locality at Sharktooth Hill Bonebed.
