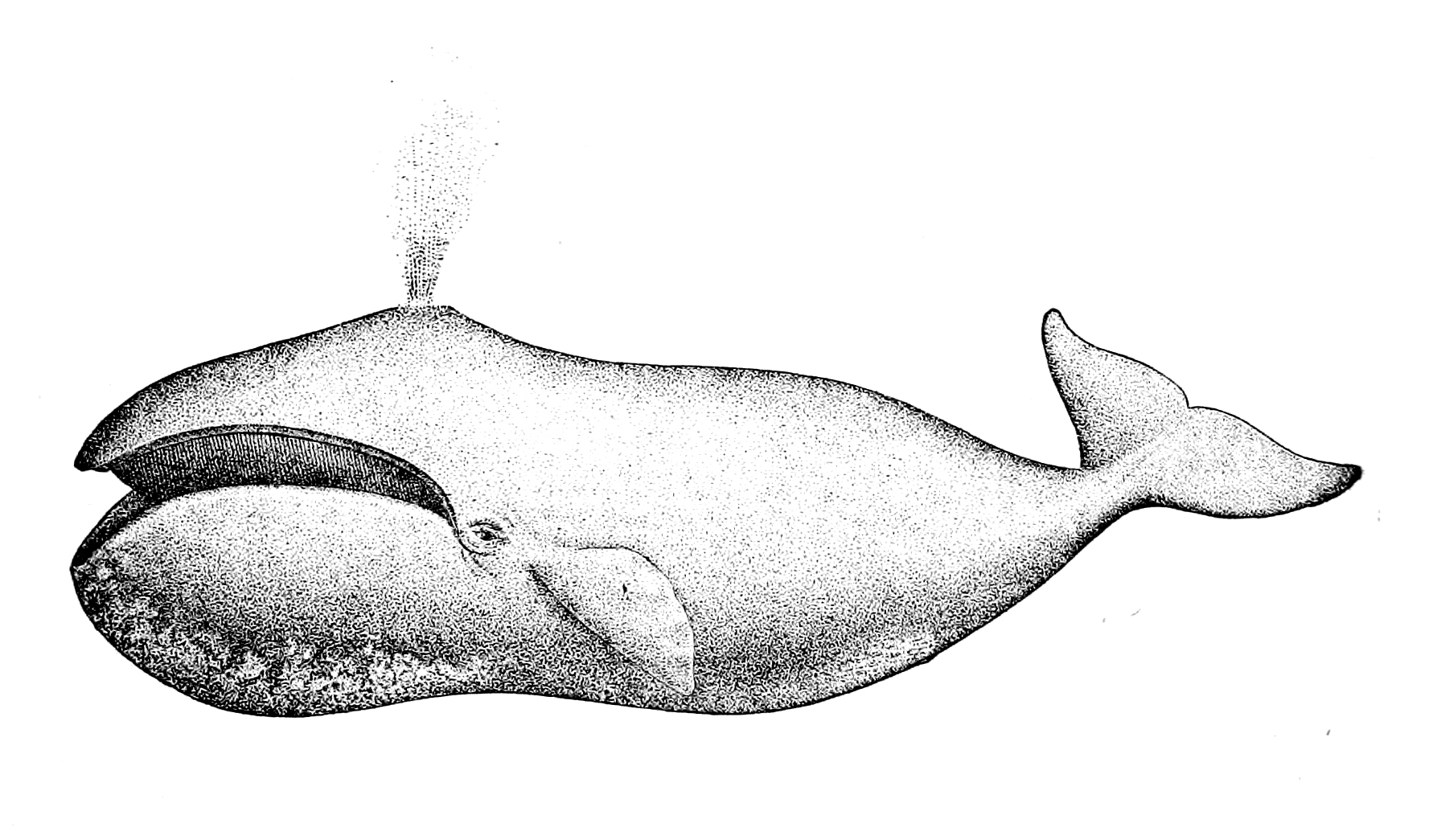
- Balaena mysticetus Illustration based on recovered fossils

Scientific classification
- Kingdom: Animalia
- Phylum: Chordata
- Class: Mammalia
- Order: Artiodactyla
- Infraorder: Cetacea
- Family: Balaenidae
- Genus: Balaena; Linnaeus, 1758

Type species
- B. mysticetus Linnaeus, 1758

Species
- B. mysticetus – Bowhead whale

Synonyms
- Balena Scopoli, 1777; Leiobalaena Eschricht, 1849

= Balaena =

Balaena Temporal range: Miocene–Recent

Genus of mammals

Balaena is a genus of cetacean (whale) in the family Balaenidae. Balaena is considered a monotypic genus, as it has only a single extant species, the bowhead whale (B. mysticetus). It was named in 1758 by Linnaeus, who at the time considered all of the right whales (and the bowhead) as a single species. Historically, both the family Balaenidae and genus Balaena were known by the common name, "right whales", however Balaena are now known as bowhead whales.

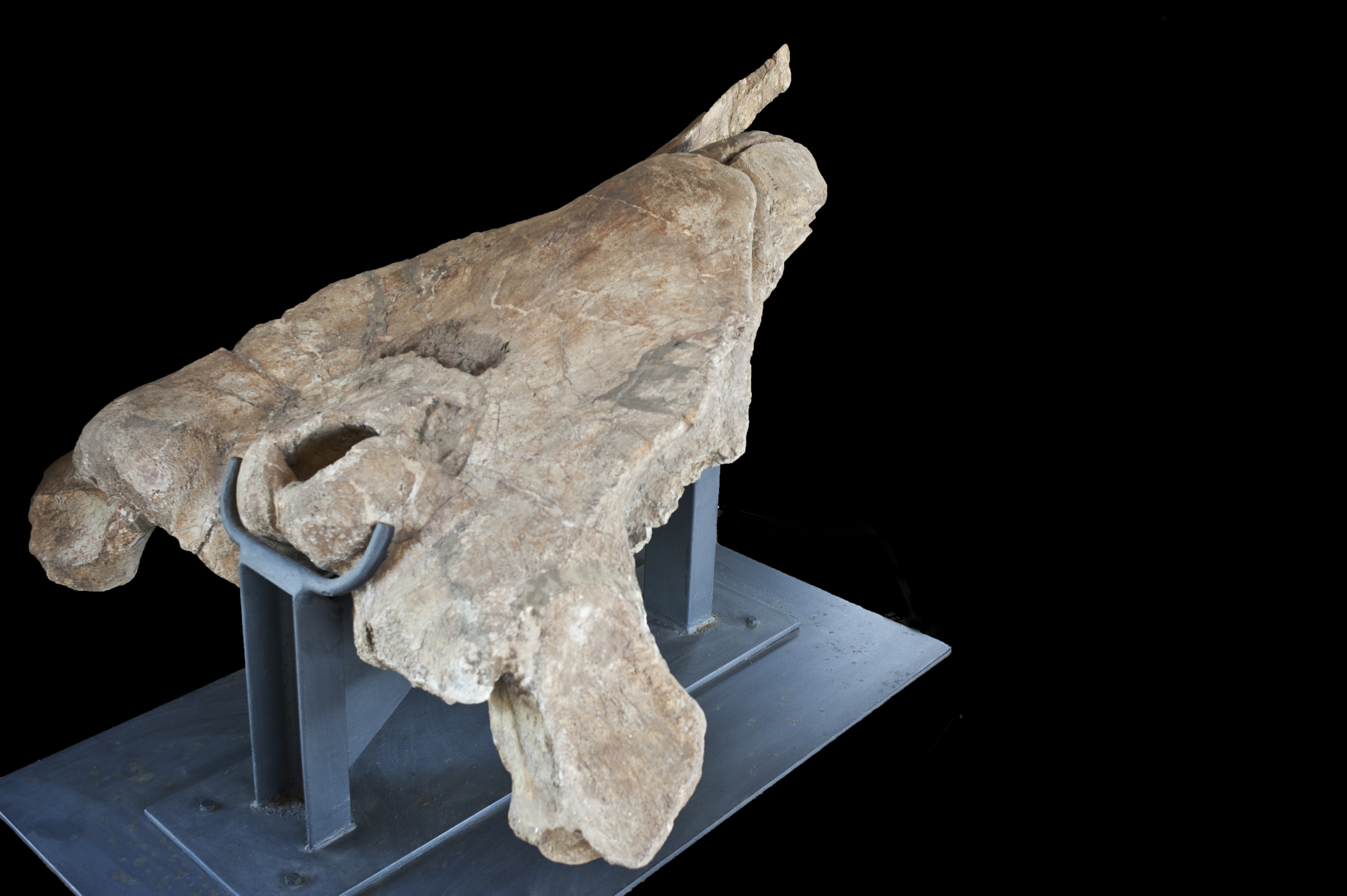
Holotype of Balaena montalionis

Throughout history, the family Balaenidae has been the subject of great taxonomic debate. Authorities have repeatedly recategorized the three populations of right whale plus the bowhead whale, as one, two, three or four species, either in a single genus or in two separate genera. In the early whaling days, they were all thought to be a single species, Balaena mysticetus. Eventually, it was recognized that bowheads and right whales were in fact different. Later, morphological factors such as differences in the skull shape of northern and southern right whales indicated at least two species of right whale—one in the Northern Hemisphere, the other in the Southern Ocean. As recently as 1998, Dale Rice, in his comprehensive and otherwise authoritative classification, Marine mammals of the world: systematics and distribution, listed just two species: Balaena glacialis (the right whales) and Balaena mysticetus (the bowheads).

A DNA study by Rosenbaum in 2000, and another study by Churchill in 2007 finally provided clear evidence to conclude that the three living right whale species do comprise a phylogenetic lineage, distinct from the bowhead, and that the bowhead and the right whales are rightly classified into two separate genera. The right whales, therefore, are now officially in the genus Eubalaena.

The fossil record of Balaena, dating to the late Miocene, encompasses ten species known from finds in Europe, North America, and South America. Balena, described by Scopoli in 1777, and Leiobalaena, described by Eschricht in 1849, are junior synonyms of Balaena.

== Taxonomy ==
- Balaena Bowhead whales
  - †Balaena affinis (Pliocene; Red Crag Formation, UK)
  - †Balaena montalionis (Piacenzian; Casina, Italy).
  - Balaena mysticetus, Bowhead whale (Late Miocene to Modern)
  - †Balaena ricei (Piacenzian; Rice's Pit, Yorktown Formation, Virginia, USA).

=== Dubious species ===
- †Balaena arcuata (Miocene/Pliocene; Belgium)
- †Balaena forsythmajori (Zanclean; Case il Poggio. Italy)
- †Balaena larteti (Neogene; Landes, France)
- †Balaena macrocephalus (Langhian; Sos, France)
- †Balaena simpsoni (Miocene/Pliocene; Ancud, Chile) (possibly a member of Neobalaenidae)
- †Balaena pampaea (Calabrian; Pampeana Formation, Bahía Blanca, Argentina)

Family Balaenidae

- Family Balaenidae
  - Eubalaena (right whales)
    - E. glacialis North Atlantic right whale
    - - E. japonica North Pacific right whale
      - E. australis Southern right whale
  - Balaena (bowhead whales)
    B. mysticetus bowhead whale

The bowhead whale, genus Balaena, in the family Balaenidae (extant taxa only)
