= 2020 in paleomammalogy =

This paleomammalogy list records new fossil mammal taxa that were described during the year 2020, as well as notes other significant paleomammalogy discoveries and events which occurred during the year.

== Afrotherians ==
=== Proboscidea ===
==== Proboscidea research ====
- A study on dietary differences among Pleistocene proboscideans in North America, and their implications for the knowledge of the causes of extinction of Cuvieronius, is published by Smith & DeSantis (2020).
- Evidence of dietary resource partitioning among three proboscidean taxa from the early Pliocene locality of Langebaanweg in South Africa (Anancus capensis, Mammuthus subplanifrons and Loxodonta cookei) is presented by Groenewald et al. (2020).
- A study on the morphology of teeth and mandible of "Serridentinus" gobiensis and Miomastodon tongxinensis, as well as on the phylogenetic affinities of these taxa, is published by Wang, Zhang & Li (2020), who reestablish Miomastodon as a genus distinct from Zygolophodon, and transfer S. gobiensis to the genus Miomastodon. update headers and lead
- A study on the phylogeography of the American mastodon, based on data from 35 complete mitochondrial genomes, is published by Karpinski et al. (2020).

=== Sirenia ===
Name	Novelty	Status	Authors	Age	Type locality	Country	Notes	Images
Trichechus hesperamazonicus	Sp. nov	Valid	Perini, Nascimento & Cozzuol	Late Pleistocene	Rio Madeira Formation	Brazil	A manatee.	

==== Sirenian research ====
- The hindlimbs of the quadrupedal sirenian Sobrarbesiren cardieli from the Eocene of Northeastern Spain are described in detail with suggestions on the aquatic locomotion of the species.
- Review of the Miocene sirenian fossil record from Sardinia is published by Carone & Rizzo, with referral of specimens to Metaxytherium cf. M. krahuletzi, and reaffirmation of "Metaxytherium lovisati" as nomen dubium.

=== Other afrotherians ===
Name	Novelty	Status	Authors	Age	Type locality	Country	Notes	Images
Stylolophus major	Sp. nov	Valid	Gheerbrant et al.	Eocene (Ypresian)	Ouled Abdoun	Morocco	An early member of Embrithopoda. Announced in 2020; the final article version was published in 2021.	

==== Miscellaneous afrotherian research ====
- A study on the anatomy of the petrosal and inner ear of Ocepeia daouiensis is published by Gheerbrant, Schmitt & Billet (2020).

== Euarchontoglires ==
=== Primates ===
Name	Novelty	Status	Authors	Age	Type locality	Country	Notes	Images
Fanchangia	Gen. et sp. nov	Valid	Harrison et al.	Early Miocene		China	A member of Pliopithecoidea. Genus includes new species F. jini.	
Kapi	Gen. et sp. nov	Valid	Gilbert et al.	Miocene		India	A catarrhine of uncertain affinities; originally identified as a gibbon, but subsequently argued to be a pliopithecoid. Genus includes new species K. ramnagarensis.	
Nesomomys	Gen. et sp. nov	Valid	Beard et al.	Eocene (Lutetian)	Uzunçarşidere	Turkey	A member of the family Omomyidae. Genus includes new species N. bunodens. Announced in 2020; the final version of the article naming was published in 2021.	
Ucayalipithecus	Gen. et sp. nov	Valid	Seiffert et al.	Paleogene	Santa Rosa locality	Peru	A member of the family Parapithecidae. Genus includes new species U. perdita.	

==== General primate research ====
- A study aiming to determine whether the relationship between primate brain size and brain shape is characterized by allometry, and whether any such relationship may reflect shared macroevolutionary trends in primate brain shape, based on data from extant and four fossil primates (Homo heidelbergensis, Australopithecus africanus, Antillothrix bernensis and Archaeolemur sp.), is published by Sansalone et al. (2020).
- Marigó et al. (2020) describe navicular bones of Anchomomys frontanyensis from the Eocene fossil site of Sant Jaume de Frontanyà-3C (Barcelona, Spain), representing first known navicular bones of an Eocene euprimate from Europe, and evaluate the implications of these fossils for the knowledge of early patterns of locomotor evolution in primates.
- A study evaluating the potential impact of a large-scale mid-Cenozoic extinction and diversification event on lemurs from Madagascar, based on comparison of the terrestrial vertebrate fauna of Madagascar in the Holocene to that of early Cenozoic continental Africa and on phylogenetic modeling, is published by Godfrey et al. (2020).
- Virtual endocast of a specimen of Necrolemur antiquus is presented by Harrington, Yapuncich & Boyer (2020), who compare the endocast morphology of N. antiquus with those of other Eocene primates.
- New fossil material of Ganlea megacanina is described by Jaeger et al. (2020), who evaluate the implications of this finding for the knowledge of the phylogenetic relationships of amphipithecine primates, and interpret amphipithecines as stem anthropoids.
- A study on the anatomy of the talus of Paralouatta marianae and P. varonai, evaluating its implications for the knowledge of the locomotor behaviors of these primate (especially for the knowledge whether or not Paralouatta represents the first known semi-terrestrial platyrrhine), is published by Püschel et al. (2020).
- New specimens of Mesopithecus pentelicus, representing the easternmost occurrence of this genus to date, are described from the Miocene site of Shuitangba (Yunnan, China) by Jablonski et al. (2020), who evaluate the implications of these fossils for the knowledge of primate dispersals and paleoecology in the late Miocene.
- A study on the evolution of the vestibular apparatus in hominoids and on the utility of the study of the inner ear morphology for reconstructions of phylogenetic relationships of fossil apes, based on data from extant anthropoids and two fossil taxa (Oreopithecus and Australopithecus), is published by Urciuoli et al. (2020).
- A study on the biomechanical performance of the patella of Pierolapithecus catalaunicus is published by Pina et al. (2020).
- A study reevaluating the anatomical evidence for bipedalism in Danuvius guggenmosi is published by Williams et al. (2020).
- A study on the ecology of fossil hominins and co-existing primates in the Turkana Basin area (circa 4 to 2 Ma), based on data from tooth enamel stable calcium isotope values, is published by Martin et al. (2020).

==== Paleoanthropological research ====
- A study on the impact caused by hard plant tissues in contact with tooth enamel is published by van Casteren et al. (2020), who evaluate the implications of their findings for the knowledge of the diet of early hominins.
- A study on the mandible morphology, chewing biomechanics and probable diet of early hominins is published by Marcé-Nogué et al. (2020).
- A study on metacarpal trabecular and cortical bone in early hominins, and on its implications for the knowledge of diversity in hominin hand use (especially in Australopithecus sediba), is published by Dunmore et al. (2020).
- A study on the phalangeal curvature of a chimpanzee who was raised during the 1930s to live much like a human, having very few opportunities to engage in arboreal activities, is published by Wallace, Burgess & Patel (2020), who attempt to determine the extent to which phalangeal curvature is shaped by arboreal locomotion during life relative to genetic factors, and evaluate the implications of their findings for the interpretations of phalangeal curvature among fossil hominins.
- A study on the evolution of human brain size, shape, and asymmetry, based on data from apes and from species belonging to the genus Homo, is published by Melchionna et al. (2020), who report evidence indicating a significant shift in the rate of brain shape evolution in the clade including modern humans, Neanderthals and Homo heidelbergensis.
- Two hominin skulls, representing the earliest definitive occurrence of Paranthropus robustus and the earliest occurrence of a cranium with clear affinities to Homo erectus reported so far, are described from Drimolen (South Africa) by Herries et al. (2020), who interpret their findings as evidence that Homo, Paranthropus and Australopithecus were contemporaneous at ~2 million years ago.
- A study on the locomotion of two hominins from the Sterkfontein Caves in South Africa (Australopithecus africanus and a geologically younger hominin of uncertain phylogenetic placement, either Paranthropus robustus or a member of the genus Homo), testing for evidence of committed terrestrial bipedalism and for significant bouts of climbing, is published by Georgiou et al. (2020).
- A study on changes of the diet of the hominins from the Shungura and Usno Formations (Ethiopia) through time, as indicated by carbon isotope data, is published by Wynn et al. (2020).
- A study on the maturational pattern of Paranthropus robustus, based on data from fossils from the Kromdraai B cave site (South Africa), is published by Cazenave et al. (2020), who report evidence indicating that P. robustus had a maturational pattern that more closely approached the extant ape rather than the human condition.
- A study on the histology of a third permanent molar of a specimen of Paranthropus robustus from the Swartkrans site (South Africa), evaluating its implications for the knowledge of the timing of teeth maturation in this hominin, is published by Dean et al. (2020).
- An approximately 2-million-year-old skull of a male Paranthropus robustus is described from the Drimolen Main Quarry by Martin et al. (2020), who argue that the morphology of this specimen refutes existing hypotheses of sexual dimorphism in this hominin, and instead documents microevolutionary changes within this species.
- Detailed comparative description of the DNH 7 skull from Drimolen is published by Rak et al. (2020).
- Richmond et al. (2020) report the first associated hand and upper limb skeleton of Paranthropus boisei from the Ileret site (Kenya).
- A study aiming to determine the length of the Achilles tendon in Australopithecus is published by McNutt & DeSilva (2020).
- A study on the anatomy of the atlas of the Australopithecus specimen Stw 573 ("Little Foot") and an additional Australopithecus specimen StW 679 from the Sterkfontein Member 4 (South Africa, evaluating their implications for the knowledge of kinematics of head-neck movements and blood supply contributing to brain metabolism in Australopithecus is published by Beaudet et al. (2020).
- A study on brain organization and growth in Australopithecus afarensis is published by Gunz et al. (2020).
- A 1.4-million-y-old large bone fragment shaped into handaxe-like form is described from the Konso Formation (Ethiopia) by Sano et al. (2020), expanding the documented technological repertoire of African Early Pleistocene Homo.
- An assemblage of immature remains of Homo naledi, including the first partial skeleton of a juvenile member of this species, is reported from the Dinaledi Chamber of the Rising Star Cave (South Africa) by Bolter et al. (2020).
- Bolter & Cameron (2020) utilize the methods used to study human growth and development for the reconstruction of ontogeny of Homo naledi.
- A study on the morphology of the mandibular premolars of Homo naledi, and on its implications for the knowledge of possible evolutionary links between H. naledi and hominins from Sterkfontein and Swartkrans, is published by Davies et al. (2020).
- A study on the timing of the first appearance of Homo erectus at the Sangiran site (Indonesia) is published by Matsu'ura et al. (2020).
- Semaw et al. (2020) report the discovery of crania of Homo erectus and both Acheulean and Oldowan artifacts at the Busidima North and Dana Aoule North sites (Gona, Afar, Ethiopia), and interpret these findings as evidence of behavioral diversity and flexibility of H. erectus.
- Reconstruction of the thorax of the juvenile H. erectus skeleton KNM-WT 15000 from Nariokotome (Kenya) is presented by Bastir et al. (2020), who evaluate the implications of the anatomy of this individual for the knowledge of the evolution of the modern human body shape.
- A study on the anatomy of the Dali Man is published by Wu (2020).
- Welker et al. (2020) present tooth enamel proteomes of Homo antecessor from Atapuerca (Spain) and Homo erectus from Dmanisi (Georgia), and evaluate the implications of their findings for the knowledge of the phylogenetic placement of H. antecessor.
- A study on tooth enamel development in hominins from the paleontological sites of the Atapuerca complex, aiming to determine whether the Atapuerca hominins shared a suite or pattern of dental developmental characteristics with Homo sapiens, is published by Modesto-Mata et al. (2020).
- A study on the morphology of hominin bones from the Sima de los Huesos site (Atapuerca, Spain) is published by Bartsiokas & Arsuaga (2020), who interpret their findings as likely evidence of hibernation in the Atapuerca hominins.
- A study on the age of the Kabwe 1 skull from Broken Hill (Zambia), and on its implications for the knowledge of human evolution, is published by Grün et al. (2020).
- Evidence of interbreeding between common ancestors of Neanderthals and Denisovans with a different hominin population that separated from other humans about 2 million years ago is presented by Rogers, Harris & Achenbach (2020).
- Petr et al. (2020) sequence Y chromosomes from Neanderthals and Denisovans, and evaluate the implications of their findings for the knowledge of the evolutionary history of Neanderthals and Denisovans.
- Zhang et al. (2020) report the discovery of Denisovan mitochondrial DNA from sediments of the Baishiya Karst Cave deposited ~100 thousand, ~60 thousand and possibly as recently as ~45 thousand years ago, and interpret their findings as evidence of long-term occupation of this cave by Denisovans.
- A study on the early life of Neanderthals, based on data from three Neanderthal individuals from northeastern Italy, is published by Nava et al. (2020), who interpret their findings as indicating that the modern human nursing strategy was present among these Neanderthals.
- A study on the exploitation of bivalves by Neanderthals from the Moscerini cave site (Italy) is published by Villa et al. (2020), who report evidence indicating that Neanderthals collected aquatic resources by skin diving.
- Zilhão et al. (2020) present evidence from the Figueira Brava site on the Atlantic coast of Portugal indicating that Middle Paleolithic Neanderthals from this site exploited marine resources at a scale on par with the modern human–associated Middle Stone Age of southern Africa.
- A study on an assemblage of Neanderthal remains and Middle Paleolithic artifacts from the Chagyrskaya Cave (Russia) is published by Kolobova et al. (2020), who compare this assemblage with other Altai sites, and interpret their findings as evidence of at least two Neanderthal incursions into southern Siberia.
- A high-quality genome of a Neanderthal from the Chagyrskaya Cave is sequenced by Mafessoni et al. (2020), who interpret the data from the genes expressed in the striatum of the brain as indicating that the striatum may have evolved unique functions in Neanderthals.
- Evidence of use of fibre technology by Neanderthals is reported from the Abri du Maras site (France) by Hardy et al. (2020), who evaluate the implications of this finding for the knowledge of cognitive abilities of Neanderthals.
- García-Martínez et al. (2020) reconstruct the ribcages of perinatal and infant Neanderthal individuals, and report evidence indicating that most of the skeletal differences between the Neanderthal and modern human thorax were already largely established at birth.
- Two new reconstructions of the Kebara 2 pelvis are presented by Adegboyega et al. (2020), who evaluate the implications of this specimen for the knowledge of the Neanderthal pelvic morphology.
- Evidence of stable climatic and environmental conditions in Apulia (Italy) during the Middle to Upper Palaeolithic transition, when Neanderthals and modern humans coexisted, is presented by Columbu et al. (2020), who interpret their findings as indicating that climate did not play a key role in the disappearance of Neanderthals in this area.
- A study on the biological affinities of the Olduvai Hominid 1 is published by Willman et al. (2020), who also report evidence from tooth wear indicating that this individual wore three facial piercings.
- A study on environmental dynamics associated with the replacement of the Acheulean by early Middle Stone Age, aiming to determine how shifts in landscape-scale ecological resources might have influenced hominin adaptation during this interval on the basis of data from the Olorgesailie basin, is published by Potts et al. (2020).
- A study on an assemblage more than 400 Late Pleistocene human footprints from Engare Sero (Tanzania), and on their implications for the knowledge of the body sizes, locomotor behaviors and composition of the group of humans who generated these tracks, is published by Hatala et al. (2020), who interpret these tracks as likely evidence of cooperative and sexually divided foraging behaviors in Late Pleistocene humans.
- Wadley et al. (2020) report the discovery of grass bedding likely used to create comfortable areas for sleeping and working by people who lived in Border Cave (South Africa) at least 200,000 years ago.
- A study on the evolution of early symbolic behavior in Homo sapiens, based on data from the engraved ochre and ostrich eggshell fragments from the South African Blombos Cave and Diepkloof Rock Shelter dating up to about 100,000 years ago, is published by Tylén et al. (2020).
- Hublin et al. (2020) report the discovery and study the age of human remains found in association with Initial Upper Paleolithic artefacts from the Bacho Kiro cave (Bulgaria), and argue that this assemblage represents the earliest arrival of Upper Paleolithic Homo sapiens in Europe reported so far; a study on the ^{14}C chronology of this site is published by Fewlass et al. (2020).
- Newborns from a double grave from the Gravettian site Krems-Wachtberg (Austria) are identified as the earliest known case of monozygotic twins by Teschler-Nicola et al. (2020).
- A study on the genome of a ~34,000-year-old hominin skull cap discovered in the Salkhit Valley in northeastern Mongolia is published by Massilani et al. (2020), who present evidence indicating that this individual was a woman from a modern human population carrying genomic segments of Denisovan ancestry derived from the same Denisovan admixture event that contributed to present-day mainland Asians.
- Evidence indicating that the Paleolithic colonization of the Ryukyu Islands was a result of active and continued exploration, backed up by technological advancement, is presented by Kaifu et al. (2020).
- A study aiming to determine the varying reliance of early human colonisers of Wallacea on tropical forest and terrestrial versus marine resources, as indicated by stable carbon and oxygen isotope data from human and faunal tooth enamel from six Late Pleistocene/Holocene archaeological sequences on Timor and Alor Island, is published by Roberts et al. (2020).
- Bordes et al. (2020) identify bone micro-residues on two cobbles from the Cerutti Mastodon site (California, United States), and interpret this finding as evidence supporting human agency on bone and stone artefacts from this site.
- Evidence from fecal biomarkers indicating that pre-Clovis coprolites from the Paisley Caves complex (Oregon, United States) are human is presented by Shillito et al. (2020).
- A study on the timing of the peopling of the Americas, based on chronometric data from 42 North American and Beringian archaeological sites, is published by Becerra-Valdivia & Higham (2020).
- Evidence of human presence in the Americas during the Last Glacial Maximum is reported from the Chiquihuite Cave (Zacatecas, Mexico) by Ardelean et al. (2020), who interpret their findings as pushing back dates for human dispersal to the region possibly as early as 33,000–31,000 years ago.
- A study on the age and duration of the Clovis complex is published by Waters, Stafford & Carlson (2020).
- Two Early Holocene hunter-gatherer burials, including a burial of a young adult woman associated with a hunting toolkit of stone projectile points and animal processing tools, are reported from the Wilamaya Patjxa site (Peru) by Haas et al. (2020), who also review other Late Pleistocene and Early Holocene burials throughout the Americas, and interpret their findings as consistent with nongendered labor practices in which early hunter-gatherer women were big-game hunters.

=== Rodents ===
Name	Novelty	Status	Authors	Age	Type locality	Country	Notes	Images
Anomalomys grytsivensis	Sp. nov	In press	Nesin & Kovalchuk	Miocene		Ukraine	A member of the family Anomalomyidae	
Argaleogaulus	Gen. et sp. nov	Valid	Korth & Kron	Arikareean	Troublesome	United States (Colorado)	A member of the family Mylagaulidae. Genus includes new species A. primoticus.	
Arvicola nahalensis	Sp. nov	Valid	Maul, Rabinovich & Biton	Late Pleistocene		Israel	A species of Arvicola. Announced in 2020; the final version of the article naming it was published in 2021.	
Balantiomys coloradensis	Sp. nov	Valid	Korth & Kron		Troublesome	United States (Colorado)	A member of the family Heteromyidae.	
Bibimys massoiai	Sp. nov	Valid	Das Neves et al.	Late Quaternary		Brazil	A species of Bibimys.	
Borikenomys	Gen. et sp. nov		Marivaux et al.	late Early Oligocene	San Sebastián	United States (Puerto Rico)	A member of the superfamily Chinchilloidea, possibly belonging to the family Dinomyidae. The type species is B. praecursor.	
Ceratogaulus cornutasagma	Sp. nov	Valid	Calede & Samuels			United States (Nebraska)		
"Cricetodon" venczeli	Sp. nov	Valid	Hír, Codrea & Prieto	Miocene		Romania	A large hamster. Announced in 2019; the final version of the article naming it was published in 2020.	
Ctenomys viarapaensis	Sp. nov	In press	De Santi et al.	Holocene		Argentina	A tuco-tuco	
Cupidinimus robinsoni	Sp. nov	Valid	Korth & Kron		Troublesome	United States (Colorado)	A member of the family Heteromyidae.	
Entoptychus rensbergeri	Sp. nov	Valid	Korth & Kron		Troublesome	United States (Colorado)	A gopher.	
Episiphneus dalianensis	Sp. nov	Valid	Qin et al.	Late Pliocene		China	A zokor. Announced in 2020; the final version of the article naming it was published in 2021.	
Golunda aouraghei	Sp. nov	Valid	Piñero et al.	Pliocene-Pleistocene boundary		Morocco	A relative of the Indian bush rat	
Gregorymys mixtecorum	Sp. nov	Valid	Ortiz-Caballero, Jiménez-Hidalgo & Bravo-Cuevas	Oligocene (Arikareean)		Mexico	A gopher.	
Gregorymys montanus	Sp. nov	Valid	Korth & Kron		Troublesome	United States (Colorado)	A gopher.	
Gregorymys tavenneri	Sp. nov	Valid	Calede & Rasmussen	Arikareean	Renova	United States (Montana)	A gopher.	
Harrymys cyanothos	Sp. nov	Valid	Korth & Kron		Troublesome	United States (Colorado)	A member of the family Heteromyidae.	
Harrymys taussigi	Sp. nov	Valid	Korth & Kron		Troublesome	United States (Colorado)	A member of the family Heteromyidae.	
Honeymys	Gen. et comb. nov	Valid	Martin et al.	Miocene (Clarendonian)		United States (Nebraska; Nevada; Oklahoma)	A member of the family Cricetidae, possibly belonging to the subfamily Sigmodontinae; a new genus for "Copemys" mariae Baskin & Korth (1996). Genus also includes "Copemys" esmeraldensis Clark, Dawson & Wood (1964).	
Huerzelerimys asiaticus	Sp. nov	Valid	Wang, Qiu & Li	Late Miocene	Liushu	China	A member of the family Muridae belonging to the subfamily Murinae	
Hystrix brevirostra	Sp. nov	Valid	Wang & Qiu	Late Miocene and early Pliocene	Hewangjia; Liushu	China	A species of Hystrix.	
Luantus sompallwei	Sp. nov	In press	Solórzano et al.	Miocene	Cura-Mallín	Chile	A member of Caviomorpha.	
Namaphiomys	Gen. et sp. nov	Valid	Pickford	Eocene		Namibia	A member of Phiomorpha of uncertain phylogenetic placement. The type species is N. scopulus.	
Oregonomys perilaccos	Sp. nov	Valid	Korth & Kron		Troublesome	United States (Colorado)	A member of the family Heteromyidae.	
Paraethomys baeticus	Sp. nov	Valid	Piñero & Verzi	Pliocene (Ruscinian)	Baza	Spain	A member of the family Muridae belonging to the subfamily Murinae.	
Pareumys flynni	Sp. nov	Valid	Korth	Eocene (Bridgerian and Uintan)	Washakie	United States (Wyoming)	A member of the family Cylindrodontidae.	
Pareumys muffleri	Sp. nov	Valid	Lofgren et al.	Eocene		United States (Montana)		
Pauromys turnbulli	Sp. nov	Valid	Korth	Eocene (Uintan)	Washakie	United States (Wyoming)	A member of the family Sciuravidae.	
Perasciuravus	Gen. et sp. nov	Valid	Korth	Eocene (Bridgerian)	Washakie	United States (Wyoming)	A member of the family Sciuravidae. Genus includes new species P. mcintoshi.	
Petaurista tetyukhensis	Sp. nov	Valid	Tiunov & Gimranov	Late Pleistocene		Russia	A species of Petaurista. Announced in 2019; the final version of the article naming it was published in 2020.	
Pleurolicus compressus	Sp. nov	Valid	Korth & Kron		Troublesome	United States (Colorado)	A gopher.	
Pleurolicus gwinni	Sp. nov	Valid	Calede & Rasmussen	Arikareean	Renova	United States (Montana)	A gopher.	
Pleurolicus mensae	Sp. nov	Valid	Korth & Kron		Troublesome	United States (Colorado)	A gopher.	
Pleurolicus nelsoni	Sp. nov	Valid	Calede & Rasmussen	Arikareean	Renova	United States (Montana)	A gopher.	
Pleurolicus rensbergeri	Sp. nov	Valid	Calede & Rasmussen	Arikareean	Renova	United States (Montana)	A gopher.	
Protospermophilus parvus	Sp. nov	Valid	Korth & Kron		Troublesome	United States (Colorado)	A member of the family Sciuridae.	
Pseudocylindrodon yihesubuensis	Sp. nov	Valid	Li	Late Eocene	Erlian Basin	China	A member of the family Cylindrodontidae.	
Rupestromys	Gen. et sp. nov	Valid	Pickford	Eocene		Namibia	A member of Phiomorpha of uncertain phylogenetic placement. The type species is R. brevirostris.	
Schizodontomys bareia	Sp. nov	Valid	Korth & Kron		Troublesome	United States (Colorado)	A member of the family Heteromyidae.	
Spermophilinus kumkolensis	Sp. nov	Valid	Li et al.	Middle Miocene	Shimagou	China	A member of the family Sciuridae belonging to the subfamily Sciurinae. Announced in 2019; the final version of the article naming it was published in 2020.	
Thisbemys intermedius	Sp. nov	Valid	Korth	Bridgerian	Washakie	United States (Wyoming)	A member of the family Ischyromyidae.	
Thryonomys kamulai	Sp. nov	Valid	Tanabe et al.	Late Miocene	Nakali	Kenya	A cane rat.	
Uromys aplini	Sp. nov	Valid	Cramb, Hocknull & Price	Middle Pleistocene		Australia	A species of Uromys.	

==== Rodentian research ====
- Description of new fossil material of Cephalomys arcidens from the Deseadan locality of Cabeza Blanca (Argentina), and a study on the species belonging to the genus Cephalomys and on the phylogenetic relationships of cephalomyids, is published by Busker, Dozo & Soto (2020).
- A study on brain anatomy and size in Neoepiblema acreensis is published by Ferreira et al. (2020).
- A study on the anatomy of the auditory region of the skull of Prospaniomys priscus is published by Arnaudo, Arnal & Ekdale (2020).
- A study on the locomotor agility of fossil ischyromyid, sciurid and aplodontid rodents, as inferred from the anatomy of the semicircular canals in their inner ear, is published by Bhagat, Bertrand & Silcox (2020).
- A study on a specimen of Ischyromys douglassi from the White River Formation of West Canyon Creek (Wyoming, United States), representing the oldest and most complete articulated skeleton yet known of Ischyromys, is published by Rankin, Emry & Asher (2020), who report that this specimen exhibits anatomical sciuromorphy, and evaluate its implications for the knowledge of jaw musculature evolution in rodents.
- A study on the locomotor behavior of Paramys delicatus is published by Prufrock, Ruff & Rose (2020), who also attempt to determine the body mass of P. delicatus and other early North American paramyines.
- A study on the morphology of the skull of the endemic dormouse Leithia melitensis from the Pleistocene of Sicily is published by Hennekam et al. (2020), who present a composite digital model of the skull of this rodent.
- A study on the evolution of island gigantism in fossil dormice from Sicily and the Balearic Islands is published by Hennekam et al. (2020).
- A study on the diet of Pliocene beavers belonging to the genus Dipoides from the High Arctic Beaver Pond fossil locality (Ellesmere Island, Canada), aiming to determine whether early woodcutting behaviour of beavers was driven by nutritional needs, is published by Plint et al. (2020).
- Partial mitochondrial genome of the extinct beaver Castoroides is reported by Xenikoudakis et al. (2020), who evaluate the implications of this finding for the knowledge of the origin of aquatic behavior of beavers.
- A study on the anatomy of the skeleton of Copemys loxodon is published by Ronez, Martin & Pardiñas (2020).
- A study on the anatomy and phylogenetic relationships of Megaoryzomys curioi is published by Ronez et al. (2020).
- A study aiming to determine whether insularity might have affected bone metabolism in Late Quaternary murine rodents from Timor is published by Miszkiewicz et al. (2020).

=== Other euarchontoglires ===
Name	Novelty	Status	Authors	Age	Type locality	Country	Notes	Images
Alilepus spassovi	Sp. nov	Valid	Sen	Early Pliocene	Chepino Basin	Bulgaria	A member of the family Leporidae.	
Chiromyoides kesiwah	Sp. nov	Valid	Beard et al.	Tiffanian		United States (Wyoming)	A member of the family Plesiadapidae.	
Tonomochota	Gen. et 3 sp. nov	Valid	Tiunov & Gusev	Late Pleistocene		Russia	A pika. Genus includes new species T. khasanensis, T. sikhotana and T. major. Announced in 2020; the final version of the article naming it was published in 2021.	

==== Miscellaneous euarchontoglires research ====
- Virtual endocast of the stem lagomorph Megalagus turgidus is reconstructed by López-Torres et al. (2020).
- Description of new fossil material of Arnebolagus leporinus from the Eocene Naran Bulak Formation (Mongolia) and a study on the phylogenetic relationships of this taxon is published by Lopatin & Averianov (2020), who name new clades Eulagomorpha and Epilagomorpha.
- A study on the body mass, eco-evolutionary dynamics and adaptations to insular conditions in fossil pikas Prolagus apricenicus and Prolagus imperialis is published by Moncunill-Solé (2020).
- A study on the morphology of teeth and likely dietary ecology of the fossil treeshrews Prodendrogale yunnanica and Ptilocercus kylin is published by Selig et al. (2020).
- A study on the anatomy of the skull of Microsyops annectens is published by Silcox, Gunnell & Bloch (2020).

== Xenarthrans ==
=== Cingulata ===
Name	Novelty	Status	Authors	Age	Type locality	Country	Notes	Images
Chlamydophractus	Gen. et sp. nov	Valid	Barasoain et al.	Late Miocene	Arroyo Chasicó Formation	Argentina	A fairy armadillo. The type species is C. dimartinoi.	
Glyptodon jatunkhirkhi	Sp. nov	Valid	Cuadrelli et al.	Quaternary		Bolivia		
Panochthus florensis	Sp. nov	Disputed	Brambilla, Lopez & Parent	Late Pleistocene		Argentina	A glyptodont. Considered to be species inquirenda by Zamorano, Vezzosi & Mones (2026).	
Prozaedyus scillatoyanei	Sp. nov	Valid	Barasoain et al.	Miocene (Chasicoan)	Loma de Las Tapias Formation	Argentina	An armadillo belonging to the subfamily Euphractinae.	

==== Cingulatan research ====
- Osteoderms from three Brazilian Holmesina cryptae specimens are reported showing lesions of possible ectoparasitic origin, and similar to lesions created by Tungidae fleas.

=== Pilosa ===
Name	Novelty	Status	Authors	Age	Type locality	Country	Notes	Images
Magdalenabradys	Gen. et comb. et sp. nov	Valid	Rincón & McDonald	Miocene (Laventan to Huayquerian)	Urumaco Formation; Villavieja Formation	Colombia; Venezuela	A Mylodontidae sloth. The type species is "Pseudoprepotherium" confusum Hirschfeld (1985) genus also includes new species M. kolossiaia.	
Sibotherium	Gen. et sp. nov	Valid	Rincón, Valerio & Laurito	Miocene (Hemphillian)	Curré Formation	Costa Rica	A Megatheriidae sloth. The type species is S. ka.	
Xibalbaonyx exinferis	Sp. nov	In press	Stinnesbeck et al.	Pleistocene		Mexico	A Megalonychidae sloth.	

==== Pilosan research ====
- A study on the anatomy of the skull of Pronothrotherium typicum, and on the validity of the species assigned to the genus Pronothrotherium, is published by Gaudin et al. (2020).
- Barbosa et al. (2020) describe a femur of a specimen of Nothrotherium maquinense from the Lapa dos Peixes I cave (Brazil) affected by parosteal osteosarcoma, representing the first case of cancer in a Quaternary non-human mammal reported so far.
- A study on an assemblage of at least 22 specimens of Eremotherium laurillardi from the Pleistocene locality Tanque Loma (Ecuador) is published by Lindsey et al. (2020), who interpret this assemblage as likely resulting from a mass mortality event, and evaluate its implications for the knowledge of the ecology of ground sloths.
- Previously unreported postcranial material of the holotype specimen of Xibalbaonyx oviceps, providing information on the locomotion capabilities of this species, is described by Stinnesbeck et al. (2020).
- A study on the external and internal anatomy of the skull of Catonyx tarijensis is published by Boscaini et al. (2020).
- A study on the anatomy of the skeleton of the manus of Scelidotherium, and on the phylogenetic relationships of this genus, is published by Nieto et al. (2020).
- A study on a late Pleistocene assemblage of several individuals of Lestodon armatus from Playa del Barco site (Argentina), aiming to determine the origin of this assemblage and its implications for the knowledge of the biology of L. armatus, is published by Tomassini et al. (2020).
- A study on the anatomy and phylogenetic relationships of Glossotherium wegneri is published by De Iuliis et al. (2020), who argue against the recognition of Oreomylodon as a distinct genus.
- A study testing the inhibitory cascade model on the evolution of the dentition of sloths is published by Varela et al. (2020).

=== Other xenarthans ===
==== Miscellaneous xenarthan research ====
- A metacarpal of a member of Xenarthra of uncertain phylogenetic placement is reported from the Eocene La Meseta Formation (Seymour Island) by Davis et al. (2020), supporting previously controversial reports of Xenarthra from Antarctica.

== Laurasiatherians ==
=== Chiroptera ===
Name	Novelty	Status	Authors	Age	Type locality	Country	Notes	Images
Cuvierimops penalveri	Sp. nov	Valid	Crespo et al.	Early Miocene		Spain	A free-tailed bat.	
Macroderma handae	Sp. nov	Valid	Aplin & Armstrong in Armstrong, Aplin & Motokawa	Pliocene or early Pleistocene		Australia		
Mops kerio	Sp. nov	Valid	Gunnell & Manthi	Pliocene	Kanapoi site	Kenya	Announced in 2018; the final article version was published in 2020.	
Mops turkwellensis	Sp. nov	Valid	Gunnell & Manthi	Pliocene	Kanapoi site	Kenya	Announced in 2018; the final article version was published in 2020.	
Rousettus pattersoni	Sp. nov	Valid	Gunnell & Manthi	Pliocene	Kanapoi site	Kenya	Announced in 2018; the final article version was published in 2020.	
Saccolaimus kenyensis	Sp. nov	Valid	Gunnell & Manthi	Pliocene	Kanapoi site	Kenya	Announced in 2018; the final article version was published in 2020.	
Turkanycteris	Gen. et sp. nov	Valid	Gunnell & Manthi	Pliocene	Kanapoi site	Kenya	A very large fruit bat, larger than all extant fruit bats other than select Pteropus and Hypsignathus. The type species is T. harrisi. Announced in 2018; final article version published in 2020.	

==== Chiropteran research ====
- Part of the humerus of a large-bodied vampire bat (similar in body size to Desmodus draculae) is described from the late Pliocene or early Pleistocene asphalt-bearing deposit of El Breal de Orocual (Venezuela) by Czaplewski & Rincón (2020), representing one of the oldest vampire bats in the fossil record reported so far.

=== Notoungulates ===
- Studies on the anatomy of the skull of Paedotherium and Tremacyllus, and on its implications for the knowledge of the paleobiology of these notoungulates, are published by Ercoli et al. (2020).

Name	Novelty	Status	Authors	Age	Type locality	Country	Notes	Images
Archaeogaia	Gen. et sp. nov	In press	Zimicz et al.	Paleocene	Mealla	Argentina	An early notoungulate. Genus includes new species A. macachaae.	
Juchuysillu	Gen. et sp. nov	Valid	Croft & Anaya	Miocene	Nazareno	Bolivia	A member of the family Interatheriidae. Genus includes new species J. arenalesensis.	
Teratopithecus	Gen. et sp. nov	Valid	López et al.	Early Eocene	?Laguna del Hunco	Argentina	A member of the family Archaeopithecidae. Genus includes new species T. elpidophoros.	

=== Odd-toed ungulates ===
- A study comparing changes of body mass of ungulates belonging to the genera Lophiodon and Propalaeotherium from the middle Eocene site of Geiseltal (Germany) is published by Ring et al. (2020).
- A study on the diet of lophialetid tapiroids from the Eocene of the Erlian Basin (China), as indicated by tooth wear, is published online by Gong et al. (2020).
- A study on the sexual dimorphism and body size of Plesiaceratherium gracile is published by Lu et al. (2020), who also present a reconstruction of the body of P. gracile.
- Iurino et al. (2020) describe the braincase with a natural brain endocast of a 12–18 months old rhinocerotine rhinoceros from the Middle Pleistocene site of Melpignano (Italy).
- A study on the demographic history of the woolly rhinoceros leading up to its extinction, based on data from one complete nuclear genome and 14 mitogenomes, is published by Lord et al. (2020).
- A study aiming to determine the diet of the woolly rhinoceros and Stephanorhinus kirchbergensis is published by Stefaniak et al. (2020).
- Revision of the fossil material of hipparionines from the Miocene locality of Tizi N'Tadderht (Morocco) is published by Cirilli et al. (2020).
- Catalano et al. (2020) reconstruct a near complete mitogenome of a specimen of Equus hydruntinus from San Teodoro Cave (Sicily, Italy), and evaluate the implications of their findings for the knowledge of the phylogenetic relationships of this taxon.
- A study on the geographical origin and mobility behavior of Rancholabrean horses from the La Cinta-Portalitos and La Piedad-Santa Ana sites (Mexico), as indicated by radiogenic strontium and stable oxygen isotope data from tooth enamel, is published by Marín-Leyva et al. (2020).
- A study on near-complete mitochondrial genomes retrieved from specimens of Equus dalianensis and Przewalski's horse from Late Pleistocene strata in northeastern China, evaluating their implications for the knowledge of the phylogenetic relationships of these horses, is published by Yuan et al. (2020).

Name	Novelty	Status	Authors	Age	Type locality	Country	Notes	Images
Amynodontopsis jiyuanensis	Sp. nov	Valid	Wang et al.	Middle Eocene	Niezhuang	China	A member of the family Amynodontidae	
"Dihoplus" bethlehemsis	Sp. nov	Valid	Pandolfi, Rivals & Rabinovich	Pliocene		Israel-Palestine water divide	A rhinoceros	
Ephyrachyus woodi	Sp. nov	Valid	Bai et al.	Early–middle Eocene	Arshanto	China	Possibly a member of the family Hyracodontidae.	
Gobioceras	Gen. et sp. nov	Junior homonym	Bai et al.	Early Eocene	Arshanto	China	A relative of Forstercooperia. The type species is G. wangi. The generic name is preoccupied by Gobioceras Bogoslovskaya (1988).	
Hyrachyus? tumidus	Sp. nov	Valid	Bai et al.	Early Eocene	Arshanto	China	A member of the family Hyrachyidae.	
Iriritherium	Gen. et sp. nov	Valid	Pickford	Early Miocene		Uganda	A chalicothere belonging to the subfamily Chalicotheriinae. The type species is I. pyroclasticum.	
Mesaceratherium tschani	Sp. nov	Valid	Tissier, Antoine & Becker	Late Oligocene		Switzerland	A rhinoceros.	
Rhodopagus guoi	Sp. nov	Valid	Paepen et al.	Eocene (Arshantan)	Arshanto	China	Announced in 2020; the final version of the article naming was published in 2021.	
Triplopus? youjingensis	Sp. nov	Valid	Bai et al.	Early Eocene	Arshanto	China	A member of Rhinocerotoidea of uncertain phylogenetic placement.	
Winamia	Nom. nov	Valid	Pickford	Early Miocene	Hiwegi	Kenya	A chalicothere belonging to the subfamily Chalicotheriinae; a replacement name for Butleria de Bonis et al. (1995).	
Yimengia chaganense	Sp. nov	Valid	Bai et al.	Early Eocene	Arshanto	China	A member of Rhinocerotoidea of uncertain phylogenetic placement.	
Yimengia magna	Sp. nov	Valid	Bai et al.	Early Eocene	Nomogen	China	A member of Rhinocerotoidea of uncertain phylogenetic placement.	

=== Even-toed ungulates ===
- A systematic revision of the even-toed ungulate fauna from Aumelas and Saint-Martin-de-Londres localities (France), and a study on the implications of these ungulates for the knowledge of the phylogenetic relationships and evolutionary history of early endemic even-toed ungulates from Europe, is published by Busker, Dozo & Soto (2020).
- New sample of isolated fossil auditory ossicles of cainotheriids is reported from the Paleogene karstic infillings of Dams (France) by Assemat et al. (2020), who provide the first description of a reconstructed ossicular chain of Caenomeryx filholi.
- A study on the Old World fossil record of the family Camelidae, aiming to determine the timing of the divergence between the Bactrian camel and the dromedary, is published by Geraads et al. (2020).
- A study on the phylogenetic relationships of fossil South and North American camelids is published by Lynch, Sánchez-Villagra & Balcarcel (2020), who also describe a partial skeleton of a member of Lamini from the Ensenadan locality of San Nicolas (Buenos Aires Province, Argentina).
- A study on the systematic relationships of extant and fossil members of the family Cervidae is published by Heckeberg (2020).
- A study on the evolution of the cycle of growth, death and regeneration of antlers in cervids, based on data from fossil and extant taxa, is published by Rössner, Costeur & Scheyer (2020).
- A study on the brain endocast of Antifer ensenadensis is published by Fontoura et al. (2020).
- A study on the diet of Cervus astylodon, as indicated by data from tooth microwear, is published by Kubo & Fujita (2020).
- Postcranial remains and first almost complete skulls of members of the genus Samotherium are described from the Middle Maragheh sequence (northwest Iran) by Parizad et al. (2020), who also discuss the validity of the genus Alcicephalus.
- Description of new fossil bovid material from Xishuigou (Gansu, China) and a revision of the type material of "Eotragus" halamagaiensis from the Halamagai Formation (Xinjiang, China) is published by Li et al. (2020), who transfer "E." halamagaiensis to the genus Turcocerus.
- New fossil material of Miotragocerus monacensis, including the most complete skull of a member of this species reported so far, is described from the late Miocene hominid locality Hammerschmiede (southern Germany) by Hartung, Lechner & Böhme (2020).
- A record of the European water buffalo dating to the time of the Bølling–Allerød warming is reported from the Moscow Region of Russia by Vislobokova et al. (2020), who evaluate the implications of this finding for the knowledge of the dispersal and final extinction of this species.
- A study on the anatomy of molars of extant and fossil suids, and on its implications for reconstructions of diets of fossil suids from the Plio-Pleistocene Turkana Basin (Kenya), is published by Rannikko et al. (2020).
- A study on the anatomy of the deciduous teeth of members of Cetartiodactyla, and on its implications for the knowledge of the phylogenetic relationships within Hippopotamoidea, is published by Rodrigues et al. (2020), who interpret their findings as supporting the emergence of the family Hippopotamidae within bothriodontine anthracotheres from the Paleogene of Africa.
- A study comparing the distribution of ecomorphologies in the artiodactyl communities of North American Neogene savannas and modern-day African savannas is published by Morales-García, Säilä & Janis (2020).

Name	Novelty	Status	Authors	Age	Type locality	Country	Notes	Images
Bubalus murrensis extremus	Subsp. nov	Valid	Vislobokova, Tarasenko & Lopatin	Late Pleistocene		Russia (Moscow Oblast)	A subspecies of the European water buffalo.	
Cervus canadensis combrayicus	Subsp. nov	Valid	Croitor	Late Pleistocene		France	A subspecies of the elk. Announced in 2019; the final version of the article naming it was published in 2020.	
Geniokeryx	Gen. et comb. nov	Valid	Ducrocq	Late Eocene	Krabi Basin	Thailand	A member of the family Anthracotheriidae; a new genus for "Anthracokeryx" thailandicus Ducrocq (1999).	
Heliosus	Gen. et sp. nov	Valid	Burger & Jolley	Eocene (Bridgerian)	Washakie	United States (Wyoming)	A member of the family Helohyidae. The type species is H. apophis.	
Metkatius babbiangalensis	Sp. nov	Valid	Waqas & Rana	Eocene	Subathu	India	A member of the family Raoellidae	
Nyanzachoerus nakaliensis	Sp. nov	Valid	Tsubamoto et al.	Late Miocene	Nakali	Kenya	A member of the family Suidae belonging to the subfamily Tetraconodontinae	
Palembertina	Gen. et sp. nov	Valid	Weppe et al.	Eocene	Quercy Phosphorites	France	A member of the family Cainotheriidae. The type species is P. deplasi.	
Paukkaungmeryx	Gen. et sp. nov	Valid	Ducrocq et al.	Middle Eocene	Pondaung	Myanmar	A relative of Archaeomeryx. Genus includes new species P. minutus.	
Praemuntiacus	Gen. et comb. nov	Valid	Croitor, Zakharov & Mararescul	Pliocene		China; Italy; Moldova	A small muntjac-like deer. The type species is "Eostyloceros" pidoplitschkoi Korotkevich (1964); genus also includes P. triangularis (Zdansky, 1925).	
Prolistriodon	Gen. et sp. nov	Valid	Pickford et al.	Early Miocene	Soma	Turkey	A member of the family Suidae belonging to the subfamily Listriodontinae. The type species is P. smyrnensis.	
Qurliqnoria chorakensis	Sp. nov	Valid	Kostopoulos et al.	Late Miocene		Turkey	A stem-caprine bovid. Announced in 2019; the final version of the article naming it was published in 2020.	
Stenomeryx	Gen. et sp. nov	Valid	Ducrocq et al.	Middle Eocene	Pondaung	Myanmar	Probably an early chevrotain. Genus includes new species S. bahinensis.	

=== Cetaceans ===
- A study on the evolution of asymmetry in the skulls of living and extinct cetaceans is published by Coombs et al. (2020).
- A study comparing the morphology of the carpus of Ambulocetus natans, other archaeocetes and Eocene terrestrial even-toed ungulates, and evaluating its implications for the knowledge of the evolution of the forelimbs of early cetaceans, is published by Gavazzi et al. (2020).
- A study on the distributional patterns of the aetiocetids is published by Cisneros & Velez-Juarbe (2020).
- A vertebra of a small member of Neoceti, representing one of the earliest known members of this group, is described from the Eocene Submeseta Formation (Seymour Island, Antarctica) by Davydenko, Mörs & Gol'din (2020), who evaluate the implications of this finding for the knowledge of the early evolution of Neoceti.

Name	Novelty	Status	Authors	Age	Type locality	Country	Notes	Images
Ankylorhiza	Gen. et comb. nov		Boessenecker et al.	Oligocene	Ashley; Chandler Bridge	United States (South Carolina)	A large dolphin. Genus includes "Squalodon" tiedemani.	
Antwerpibalaena	Gen. et sp. nov	Valid	Lavigerie et al.	Pliocene		Belgium	A stem-balaenid. Genus includes new species A. liberatlas.	
Archaebalaenoptera liesselensis	Sp. nov	Valid	Bisconti et al.	Miocene (Tortonian)	Breda	Netherlands	A rorqual	
Archaeobalaena	Gen. et sp. nov	Valid	Tanaka, Furusawa & Kimura	Pliocene (Zanclean)	Chippubetsu	Japan	A member of the family Balaenidae. The type species is A. dosanko.	
Atlanticetus	Gen. et comb. et sp. nov	Valid	Bisconti et al.	Miocene	Calvert; Pietra da Cantoni	Italy; United States	An early baleen whale. The type species is "Aglaocetus" patulus Kellogg (1968); genus also includes new species A. lavei.	A. patulus
Cozzuoliphyseter	Gen. et comb. nov	Valid	Paolucci et al.	Miocene	Gran Bajo del Gualicho	Argentina	A member of the family Physeteridae; a new genus for "Aulophyseter" rionegrensis.	
Dolgopolis	Gen. et sp. nov	Valid	Viglino et al.	Miocene (Burdigalian)	Gaiman	Argentina	A toothless platanistoid dolphin. Genus includes new species D. kinchikafiforo. Announced in 2020; the final version of the article naming it was published in 2021.	
Ensidelphis	Gen. et sp. nov	Valid	Bianucci et al.	Miocene (Burdigalian)	Chilcatay	Peru	A member of Platanistoidea. The type species is E. riveroi.	
Furcacetus	Gen. et sp. nov	Valid	Bianucci et al.	Miocene (Burdigalian)	Chilcatay	Peru	A member of the family Squalodelphinidae. The type species is F. flexirostrum.	
Marzanoptera	Gen. et sp. nov	Valid	Bisconti et al.	Pliocene		Italy	A rorqual. Genus includes new species M. tersillae.	
Norisdelphis	Gen. et sp. nov	Valid	Kimura & Hasegawa	Miocene (Tortonian)	Haraichi	Japan	An oceanic dolphin. Genus includes new species N. annakaensis.	
Perditicetus	Gen. et sp. nov	Valid	Nelson & Uhen	Oligocene–Miocene (Chattian–Aquitanian)	Nye	United States (Oregon)	A member of Platanistoidea. Genus includes new species P. yaconensis.	
Platyscaphokogia	Gen. et sp. nov	Valid	Collareta et al.	Miocene (Messinian)	Pisco	Peru	A member of the family Kogiidae belonging to the subfamily Scaphokogiinae. The type species is P. landinii.	
Protororqualus wilfriedneesi	Sp. nov	Valid	Bisconti & Bosselaers	Pliocene (Zanclean	Kattendijk Sands; Yorktown	Belgium; Netherlands; United States (North Carolina)		
Rhaphicetus	Gen. et sp. nov	Valid	Lambert et al.	Miocene (Burdigalian)	Chilcatay	Peru	A member of Physeteroidea. Genus includes new species R. valenciae.	
Samaydelphis	Gen. et sp. nov	Valid	Lambert et al.	Miocene (Tortonian)	Pisco	Peru	A member of the family Pontoporiidae. Genus includes new species S. chacaltanae.	
Scaphokogia totajpe	Sp. nov	Valid	Benites-Palomino et al.	Late Miocene	Pisco	Peru	A member of the family Kogiidae.	

=== Carnivorans ===
- A study on changes in hindlimb functional diversity in North American carnivoran communities (especially in felids) over the last 19 million years is published by Polly (2020).
- Description of the tarsal bones of the bear dogs from the Paleogene of Europe, and a study on the evolution of posture and locomotion of European bear dogs, is published by Fournier et al. (2020).
- New fossil material of Megamphicyon giganteus, providing new information on the locomotor adaptations of this species and allowing an estimation of its body mass, is described from the middle Miocene (MN6) site of Carpetana (Spain) by Siliceo et al. (2020).
- A study aiming to determine the impact of large body size and adaptation to hypercarnivory on extinction risk throughout the evolutionary history of North American canids is published by Balisi & Van Valkenburgh (2020).
- A study on the anatomy of the holotype specimen of Vulpes alopecoides and on the diversity of the Plio-Pleistocene members of the genus Vulpes from Europe is published by Bartolini Lucenti & Madurell-Malapeira (2020), who consider the species Vulpes praeglacialis and V. praecorsac to be junior synonyms of V. alopecoides.
- A study on the anatomy and likely diet of "Canis" ferox is published online by Bartolini Lucenti & Rook (2020), who transfer this species to the genus Eucyon.
- Tong et al. (2020) document dental injuries (likely caused by processing hard food, such as bones) and infections and a healed tibia fracture in specimens of Canis chihliensis from the Early Pleistocene Nihewan Basin (China), and interpret these findings as possible evidence of social hunting and family care in this canid.
- A study comparing the anatomy of hyoid bones of dire wolves and coyotes from La Brea Tar Pits with those of extant canids, and evaluating the implications of reported anatomical differences for the knowledge of likely vocalizations of fossil canids, is published by Flores et al. (2020).
- The study of the extensive record of Canis from Dmanisi showed the combination so primitive and derived species that contrast with the previous interpretation of these specimens to Canis etruscus and support the description of the new species Canis borjgali, very close to Canis mosbachensis and probably to modern wolves, coyotes and affine dogs (Bartolini Lucenti et al. 2020)
- Partial fragment of the mandible of a dire wolf is described from the Late Pleistocene of northeastern China by Lu et al. (2020), representing the first record of this species from Eurasia reported so far.
- Ramos-Madrigal et al. (2020) sequence the genomes of four Pleistocene wolves from Northeast Siberia, including specimens with divergent skull morphologies.
- A study on a 57,000-years-old wolf pup mummy discovered in thawing permafrost in the Klondike goldfields (Yukon, Canada), aiming to determine her appearance, evolutionary relationships, life history and ecology, is published by Meachen et al. (2020).
- A study on fossil canid remains from the Pleistocene of the Paglicci Cave and the Romanelli Cave (southern Italy) is published by Boschin et al. (2020), who interpret their findings as attesting the presence of dogs in Italy at least 14,000 calibrated years before present.
- A study on the genomes of modern Greenland sled dogs, an ~9500-year-old Siberian dog associated with archaeological evidence for sled technology, and an ~33,000-year-old Siberian wolf is published by Sinding et al. (2020), who interpret their findings as indicating that sled dogs represent an ancient lineage going back at least 9500 years and that wolves bred with the ancestors of sled dogs and precontact American dogs.
- A study on aiming to reconstruct dog population history, based on data from 27 ancient (up to 10.9 thousand years old) dog genomes from Europe, the Near East and Siberia, is published by Bergström et al. (2020).
- New specimen of Agnotherium antiquum, providing new information on the anatomy of this species, is described from the Miocene locality of Eppelsheim (Germany) by Morlo et al. (2020), who interpret this species as a powerful, strictly carnivorous ambush hunter.
- A metacarpal bone of a short-faced bear is described from Daisy Cave (San Miguel Island, California Channel Islands) by Mychajliw et al. (2020), who attempt to the determine the most likely explanation of the occurrence of this specimen on San Miguel Island.
- A study on anatomical specializations in cave bears for longer hibernation periods, and on their impact on feeding biomechanics in cave bears, is published by Pérez-Ramos et al. (2020).
- A study on the diet of cave bears from cave sites in Romania, as indicated by nitrogen isotope values of individual amino acids from fossil collagen, is published by Naito et al. (2020).
- A study on the relationship between the shape of tooth crown surfaces and feeding behaviour in living bears, evaluating its implications for the knowledge of likely diet and possible extinction causes of cave bears, is published by Pérez-Ramos et al. (2020).
- Description of new fossils and a review of the fossil material of large mustelids Sivaonyx hendeyi and Plesiogulo aff. monspessulanus from the Pliocene of the Langebaanweg fossil site (South Africa) is published by Valenciano & Govender (2020).
- Description of new fossil material of Mellivora benfieldi from the Langebaanweg site and a revision of the taxonomic status of Mio–Pliocene African mellivorines is published by Valenciano & Govender (2020), who name a new tribe Eomellivorini.
- A study on the phylogenetic relationships of extant and fossil pinnipeds is published by Paterson et al. (2020).
- New fossil material of pinnipeds, including fossils referrable to Phocidae and a humerus referrable specifically to Monachinae, is described from the Upper Miocene–Lower Pliocene Beaumaris Local Fauna (Victoria, Australia) by Rule, Adams & Fitzgerald (2020), who evaluate the implications of these fossils for the knowledge of the origins of the southern true seals from the Southern Ocean.
- Rule, Hocking & Fitzgerald (2020) describe a tooth of a monachine seal from the Pliocene Whalers Bluff Formation (Victoria, Australia), and evaluate its implications for the knowledge of the timing of pinniped faunal turnovers in the Southern Hemisphere.
- Fossil teeth of a hyaenid Adcrocuta eximia and a saber-toothed cat belonging or related to the genus Paramachaerodus are described from the Miocene Chu Formation (Kyrgyzstan) by Miller et al. (2020), who evaluate the implications of these fossils for the knowledge of endemism in the fossil fauna in Kyrgyzstan.
- A study on the evolutionary history of the genus Crocuta, based on paleogenomic data from Late Pleistocene cave hyenas from across Eurasia and on population-level genomic data from sub-Saharan spotted hyenas, is published by Westbury et al. (2020).
- Description of a skull of Machairodus giganteus from the late Miocene locality Hadjidimovo (Bulgaria), and a study on the evolution of the genus Machairodus, is published by Geraads & Spassov (2020).
- A study on the evolutionary history of Homotherium, as indicated by genomic analyses, is published by Barnett et al. (2020).
- An almost complete skull of Smilodon populator, likely belonging to one of the largest known specimens of the genus with an estimated body mass over 400 kg, is described from the Lujanian Dolores Formation (Uruguay) by Manzuetti et al. (2020).
- Fossil material of Panthera gombaszoegensis georgica, representing the first record of the Eurasian jaguar in southern Asia, is described from the middle Early Pleistocene Haro River quarry (Pakistan) by Jiangzuo & Liu (2020), who present a new dispersal scenario of the jaguar in Eurasia, and compare the morphology of the teeth of the Eurasian jaguar and the living jaguar.
- A study on the evolutionary history of the cave lion, based on data from mitochondrial genomes of cave lions from across their entire prehistoric range, is published by Stanton et al. (2020).
- A study on the evolutionary history of lions, based on whole-genome resequencing data from a set of modern, historic, and Pleistocene lions, is published by de Manuel et al. (2020).

Name	Novelty	Status	Authors	Age	Type locality	Country	Notes	Images
Agriotherium hendeyi	Sp. nov	Valid	Jiangzuo & Flynn	Late Hemphillian	Quiburis	United States (Arizona)	Announced in 2019; the final version of the article naming it was published in 2020.	
Aurorarctos	Gen. et sp. nov		Jiangzuo & Flynn	Late Barstovian		United States (Nebraska)	A bear belonging to the subfamily Ursinae. The type species is A. tirawa.	
Canis borjgali	Sp. nov.	Valid	Bartolini Lucenti et al.	Early Pleistocene	Dmanisi	Georgia	An ancestor of wolf-like canids	
Circamustela peignei	Sp. nov	Valid	Valenciano et al.	Miocene (Vallesian)	Cerro de los Batallones fossil site	Spain	A member of the family Mustelidae belonging to the subfamily Guloninae.	
Cryptailurus tinaynakti	Sp. nov	Valid	Barrett et al.	Hemingfordian	Mascall	United States (Oregon)	A hypercarnivorous feliform	
Cynelos stenos	Sp. nov	Valid	Hunt & Yatkola	Early Miocene	Runningwater	United States (Nebraska)	A bear dog	
Cynodictis peignei	Sp. nov	Valid	Le Verger, Solé & Ladevèze	Late Eocene to early Oligocene	Quercy Phosphorites	France	A bear dog	
Eodesmus	Gen. et sp. nov	Valid	Tate-Jones et al.	Miocene (Burdigalian)	Astoria	United States (Oregon)	An early member of the family Desmatophocidae. Genus includes new species E. condoni.	
Eomonachus	Gen. et sp. nov	Valid	Rule et al.	Pliocene	Tangahoe	New Zealand	A monk seal. Genus includes new species E. belegaerensis.	
Ferrucyon	Gen. et comb. nov	Valid	Ruiz-Ramoni et al.	Pliocene		Mexico	A vulpine canid; a new genus for "Cerdocyon" avius.	
Jinomrefu	Gen. et sp. nov	Valid	Friscia et al.	Paleogene–Neogene boundary		Kenya	A member of the family Barbourofelidae. Genus includes new species J. lakwanza.	
Leptoplesictis peignei	Sp. nov	Valid	Grohé et al.	Miocene	Mae Moh Basin	Thailand	A mongoose	
Lycophocyon tabrumi	Sp. nov	Valid	Lofgren et al.	Eocene		United States (Montana)	A caniformian carnivoran.	
Martes crassidens	Sp. nov	Valid	Jiangzuo et al.	Early Pleistocene		China	A marten. Announced in 2020; the final version of the article naming it was published in 2021.	
Oriensmilus	Gen. et sp. nov	Valid	Wang, White & Guan	Middle Miocene	Tongxin	China	A barbourofeline. Genus includes new species O. liupanensis.	
Osodobenus	Gen. et sp. nov	Valid	Biewer, Velez-Juarbe & Parham	Miocene (Messinian)	Capistrano	United States (California)	A member of the family Odobenidae. The type species is O. eodon.	
Panthera balamoides	Sp. nov	Valid	Stinnesbeck et al.	Pleistocene		Mexico	A species of Panthera. Announced in 2018; the final version of the article naming it was published in 2020.	
Pontolis barroni	Sp. nov	Valid	Biewer, Velez-Juarbe & Parham	Miocene (probably Tortonian)	Monterey	United States (California)	A member of the family Odobenidae.	
Pontolis kohnoi	Sp. nov	Valid	Biewer, Velez-Juarbe & Parham	Miocene (Messinian)	Capistrano	United States (California)	A member of the family Odobenidae.	
Sarcodectes	Gen. et sp. nov	Valid	Rule et al.	Pliocene (Zanclean)	Yorktown	United States (North Carolina)	An earless seal belonging to the subfamily Monachinae. The type species is S. magnus.	
Siamictis	Gen. et sp. nov	Valid	Grohé et al.	Miocene	Mae Moh Basin	Thailand	A member of the family Viverridae belonging to the subfamily Paradoxurinae. The type species is S. carbonensis.	
Siamogale bounosa	Sp. nov	Valid	Grohé et al.	Miocene	Mae Moh Basin	Thailand	An otter	
Skopelogale	Gen. et sp. nov	Valid	Baskin	Miocene (Barstovian)		United States (Nebraska)	A member of the family Mustelidae of uncertain phylogenetic placement. The type species is S. melitodes.	
Storchictis	Gen. et comb. nov	Valid	De Bonis	Possibly middle or late Eocene	Quercy phosphorites	France	A bear dog. The type species is "Cynodon" miacinus Teilhard de Chardin (1915).	
Tungurictis peignei	Sp. nov	Valid	Wang et al.	Middle Miocene	Suosuoquan	China	A hyena	
Vishnuonyx maemohensis	Sp. nov	Valid	Grohé et al.	Miocene	Mae Moh Basin	Thailand	An otter	

=== Other laurasiatherians ===
Name	Novelty	Status	Authors	Age	Type locality	Country	Notes	Images
Africtis	Gen. et sp. nov	In press	Mattingly et al.	Early Oligocene		Libya	An early member of Carnivoraformes. Genus includes new species A. sirtensis.	
Atelerix steensmai	Sp. nov	Valid	Van Dam, Mein & Alcalá	Late Miocene	Teruel Basin	Spain	A hedgehog, a species of Atelerix.	
Desmana marci	Sp. nov	Valid	Minwer-Barakat et al.	Early Pliocene		Spain	A relative of the Russian desman.	
Ereberix	Gen. et sp. nov	Valid	Lopatin	Early Miocene	Loo	Mongolia	A member of the family Erinaceidae. Genus includes new species E. erebericulus.	
Lantanotherium anthrace	Sp. nov	Valid	Cailleux et al.	Miocene	Mae Moh	Thailand	A gymnure.	
Leonhardtina meridianum	Sp. nov	Valid	Solé, Marandat & Lihoreau	Eocene		France	A member of the family Hyaenodontidae.	
Matthodon peignei	Sp. nov	Valid	Solé, Marandat & Lihoreau	Eocene		France	A member of the family Hyaenodontidae.	
Mesolicaphrium	Gen. et comb. nov	Valid	McGrath, Anaya & Croft	Miocene (Laventan)	Honda Group (La Venta)	Colombia	A member of Litopterna belonging to the family Proterotheriidae, a new genus for "Prolicaphrium" sanalfonensis.	
Oxyaenoides aumelasiensis	Sp. nov	Valid	Solé, Marandat & Lihoreau	Eocene		France	A member of the family Hyaenodontidae.	
Plioblarinella	Gen. et comb. nov	Valid	Koenigswald & Reumer	Pliocene		Austria	A shrew belonging to the tribe Blarinellini; a new genus for "Petenyia" dubia	
Proscalops brevidens	Sp. nov	Valid	Korth	Oligocene (Whitneyan)		United States (South Dakota)	A soricomorph.	
Pseudobrachytherium	Gen. et sp. nov	Valid	Corona et al.	Miocene (Huayquerian)	Camacho	Uruguay	A member of Litopterna belonging to the family Proterotheriidae. Genus includes new species P. breve.	
Pseudotrimylus metaxy	Sp. nov	Valid	Korth	Oligocene (Whitneyan)		United States (South Dakota)	A shrew belonging to the subfamily Heterosoricinae. Originally described as a species of Pseudotrimylus, but subsequently transferred to the genus Noritrimylus.	
Rodcania	Gen. et sp. nov	Valid	Gelfo, García-López & Bergqvist	Paleocene	Río Loro	Argentina	A member of Xenungulata. Genus includes new species R. kakan.	
Saltaodus	Gen. et sp. nov	Valid	Gelfo et al.	Eocene	Lumbrera	Argentina	A native South American ungulate belonging to the family Didolodontidae. Genus includes new species S. sirolli. Announced in 2019; the final version of the article naming it was published in 2020.	
Suncus honeyi	Sp. nov	Valid	Flynn et al.	Late Miocene	Dhok Pathan; Nagri	Pakistan	A shrew, a species of Suncus	

==== Miscellaneous laurasiatherian research ====
- A review of the origins, evolution and paleoecology of major clades of extinct native South American ungulates is published by Croft, Gelfo & López (2020).
- Redescription of the type material of Carodnia feruglioi, providing new information on the anatomy of this species, is published by Vera, Fornasiero & del Favero (2020).
- A study on the phylogenetic relationships of the litopterns is published by Chimento & Agnolin (2020), who recover the litopterns as pan-perissodactyls, and evaluate the palaeobiogeographical implications of litoptern affinities.
- A study on the dietary habits of Macrauchenia patachonica and Xenorhinotherium bahiense is published by de Oliveira et al. (2020); the study is subsequently criticized by Dantas, Lobo & Bernardes (2020).
- A study on the anatomy, phylogenetic relationships and likely diet and locomotion of Cambaytherium is published by Rose et al. (2020), who also name a new clade Perissodactylamorpha containing the group Anthracobunia and odd-toed ungulates.

== Other eutherians ==
Name	Novelty	Status	Authors	Age	Type locality	Country	Notes	Images
Bisonalveus gracilis	Sp. nov	Valid	Fox & Scott	Paleocene (Tiffanian)	Paskapoo	Canada (Alberta)	A member of the family Pentacodontidae.	
Wyonycteris kingi	Sp. nov	Valid	Hooker	Paleogene	Woolwich	United Kingdom	A member of the family Nyctitheriidae. Announced in 2018; the final version of the article naming it was published in 2020.	

=== Miscellaneous eutherian research ===
- Eberle, von Koenigswald & Eberth (2020) study the enamel microstructure of mammalian tooth fragments from the Strathcona Fiord Fossil Forest (Eocene Margaret Formation; Ellesmere Island, Canada), and identify them as teeth of Coryphodon.

=== General eutherian research ===
- A study on the evolution of feeding strategies in marine mammals throughout their evolutionary history is published by Berta & Lanzetti (2020).
- A study on zinc isotope ratios in tooth enamel of Late Pleistocene mammals from the Tam Hay Marklot cave (Laos) is published by Bourgon et al. (2020), who evaluate potential utility of zinc isotopes as dietary tracers in paleontology and archeology.
- A study on the dietary patterns of nine herbivore families from the Shungura Formation (Ethiopia) throughout the late Pliocene and early Pleistocene, as indicated by carbon isotope data from fossil teeth, is published by Negash et al. (2020).
- Hominin and non-hominin mammal footprints and fossils dating to the last interglacial are reported from the Alathar lacustrine deposit in the western Nefud Desert (Saudi Arabia) by Stewart et al. (2020), who interpret this finding as likely to be the earliest evidence of Homo sapiens in the Arabian Peninsula reported so far.
- A study on ancient DNA recovered from fragmented bovid and rhinoceros specimens from the Neolithic site of Shannashuzha is published by Chen et al. (2020), who interpret their findings as indicating that the gaur and a rhinoceros closely related to the extant Sumatran rhinoceros lived as far north as the margin of the northeastern Tibetan Plateau during the late Neolithic.

== Metatherians ==
Name	Novelty	Status	Authors	Age	Type locality	Country	Notes	Images
Amphidolops intermedius	Sp. nov	Valid	Chornogubsky	Eocene	Huancache Formation; Laguna del Hunco Formation	Argentina	A member of Polydolopimorphia belonging to the family Polydolopidae.	
Amphidolops minimus	Sp. nov	Valid	Chornogubsky	Eocene	Tufolitas Laguna del Hunco	Argentina	A member of Polydolopimorphia belonging to the family Polydolopidae.	
Apeirodon	Gen. et sp. nov	Valid	Babot et al.	Eocene (Priabonian)	Geste Formation	Argentina	A small bunodont metatherian, possibly an early divergent member of Polydolopimorphia. Type species A. sorianoi. Announced in 2019; final published article in 2020.	
Aquiladelphis analetris	Sp. nov	Valid	Cohen, Davis & Cifelli	Late Cretaceous	Judith River Formation	United States (Montana)	An Aquiladelphidae Pediomyoidea.	
Australogale	Gen. et sp. nov	Valid	Engelman, Anaya & Croft	Laventan (Serravallian)	Honda Group	Bolivia	A member of Sparassodonta. Type species A. leptognathus. Announced in 2018; final published article in 2020.	
Copedelphys superstes	Sp. nov	Valid	Korth et al.	Whitneyan	Brule Formation	United States (North Dakota)	A member of the family Herpetotheriidae.	
Eomakhaira	Gen. et sp. nov	Valid	Engelman et al.	Early Oligocene	Abanico Formation	Chile	A Thylacosmilinae Sparassodonta. Type species is E. molossus.	
Glasbius piceanus	Sp. nov	Valid	Cohen, Davis & Cifelli	Late Cretaceous (Edmontonian)	Williams Fork Formation	United States (Colorado)	A member of Marsupialiformes belonging to the group Pediomyoidea. Originally described as a species of Glasbius; subsequently made the type species of the separate genus Heleocola.	
Hypodolops	Gen. et sp. nov	Valid	Chornogubsky	Eocene	Huancache; Tufolitas Laguna del Hunco	Argentina	A Polydolopidae Polydolopimorphia. Type species is H. sapoensis.	
Lekaneleo	Gen. et comb. nov	Valid	Gillespie, Archer & Hand	Oligocene–Miocene	Riversleigh	Australia	A marsupial lion; A new genus for "Priscileo" roskellyae Gillespie (1997)	
Mukupirna	Gen. et sp. nov	Valid	Beck et al.	Late Oligocene	Namba Formation	Australia	A member of Vombatoidea. Type species is M. nambensis.	
Pujatodon	Gen. et sp. nov	Valid	Goin et al.	Eocene (Ypresian)	La Meseta Formation	Antarctica (Seymour Island)	A probable Polydolopimorphia. Type species P. ektopos. Announced in 2018; final article version published in 2020.	
Scalaria	Gen. et 2 sp. nov	Junior homonym	Cohen, Davis & Cifelli	Late Cretaceous (Turonian)	Straight Cliffs Formation	United States (Utah)	An aquiladelphid Pediomyoidea. Genus includes new species S. martini and S. aquilana. "Scalaria" is preoccupied by Scalaria Lamarck (1801). The replacement name Scalaridelphys was coined in 2021.	

=== Metatherian research ===
- Two isolated teeth of stagodontid metatherians are described from the Cenomanian of France by Vullo et al. (2020), representing the first reported occurrence of stagodontids in Europe.
- A study on the anatomy of the skull of Andinodelphys cochabambensis, and on the phylogenetic relationships of this species, is published by de Muizon & Ladevèze (2020).
- A study comparing the anatomy of the skull and teeth of Thylacosmilus atrox and placental saber-toothed carnivores is published by Janis et al. (2020), who question the interpretation of T. atrox as having a similar type of predatory behavior to placental saber-tooths, and consider it unlikely that T. atrox used its canines to dispatch its prey.
- A study on the anatomy of the petrosal and inner ear of Peratherium elegans and Amphiperatherium elegans, and on its implications for the knowledge of the phylogenetic relationships of herpetotheriids and peradectids, is published online by Ladevèze, Selva & de Muizon (2020).
- A study on the anatomy of the teeth of Groeberia, and on the phylogenetic affinities of this genus, is published by Zimicz & Goin (2020).
- A study on the relationship between variation in skull and mandibular shape of extant and extinct macropodiforms and ecological factors such as diet, locomotion and body mass, and on the implications of this relationship for the knowledge of the feeding ecology of the fossil macropodiforms from the Riversleigh World Heritage Area, is published online by Butler et al. (2020).
- A study on the morphology of the humeri of fossil kangaroos belonging to the subfamily Sthenurinae and of Protemnodon, evaluating its implications for the knowledge of the mode of locomotion in these marsupials, is published online by Janis et al. (2020).
- The hypothesis that marsupial forelimbs are restricted by long-term developmental constraints resulting from their reproductive strategy, is challenged in a paper to be published by Martin-Serra and Benson (2020).

== Allotheria ==
=== Euharamiyida ===
Name	Novelty	Status	Authors	Age	Type locality	Country	Notes	Images
Cryoharamiya	Gen. et sp. nov	Valid	Averianov et al.	Early Cretaceous	Batylykh Formation	Russia (Sakha)	An euharamiyidan of uncertain phylogenetic placement. Type species is C. tarda.	

=== Gondwanatheria ===
Name	Novelty	Status	Authors	Age	Type locality	Country	Notes	Images
Adalatherium	Gen. et sp. nov	Valid	Krause, Hoffmann, Wible & Rougier in Krause et al.	Late Cretaceous (Maastrichtian)	Maevarano Formation	Madagascar	A Gondwanatherian. The type species is A. hui.	
Magallanodon	Gen. et sp. nov	Valid	Goin et al.	Late Cretaceous (late Campanian to early Maastrichtian)	Chorrillo Formation; Dorotea Formation	ArgentinaChile	A Gondwanatherian, possibly a Ferugliotheriidae. The type species is M. baikashkenke.	

=== Multituberculata ===
Name	Novelty	Status	Authors	Age	Type locality	Country	Notes	Images
Bructerodon	Gen. et sp. nov	In press	Martin et al.	Early Cretaceous (Barremian–Aptian)		Germany	A pinheirodontid multituberculate. Genus includes new species B. alatus.	
Cheruscodon	Gen. et sp. nov	In press	Martin et al.	Early Cretaceous (Barremian–Aptian)		Germany	An eobaatarid multituberculate. Type species C. balvensis.	
Dolichoprion	Gen. et sp. nov	Valid	Kusuhashi, Wang & Jin	Early Cretaceous	Fuxin Formation	China	An eobaatarid multituberculate. Type species D. lii. Announced in 2019; the final article version was published in 2020.	
Filikomys	Gen. et comb. nov	In press	Weaver et al.	Late Cretaceous	Belly River Group; Judith River Formation; Kaiparowits Formation; Two Medicine Formation	Canada (Alberta); United States (Montana; Utah; Wyoming)	A ptilodontoid multituberculate. Type species is F. primaevus (Lambe, 1902); Possibly also including "Mesodma" minor Eaton (2002).	
Sinobaatar pani	Sp. nov	Valid	Mao et al.	Early Cretaceous (Aptian)	Jiufotang Formation	China	An eobaatarid multituberculate.	
Tagaria	Gen. et sp. nov	Valid	Averianov et al.	Middle Jurassic (Bathonian)	Itat Formation	Russia (Krasnoyarsk Krai)	A member of Multituberculata. Genus includes new species T. antiqua.	
Tashtykia	Gen. et sp. nov	Valid	Averianov et al.	Middle Jurassic (Bathonian)	Itat Formation	Russia; Krasnoyarsk Krai	A multituberculate. The type species is T. primaeva.	

==== Multituberculate research ====
- A study on the evolution of morphological diversity of fourth premolars in cimolodontan multituberculates is published by Weaver & Wilson (2020).

== Other mammals ==
Name	Novelty	Status	Authors	Age	Type locality	Country	Notes	Images
Amblotherium megistodon	Sp. nov	Valid	Foster, Pagnac & Hunt-Foster	Late Jurassic	Morrison Formation	United States (Wyoming)	A member of the family Dryolestidae.	
Fuxinoconodon	Gen. et sp. nov	Valid	Kusuhashi et al.	Early Cretaceous (Aptian–Albian)	Fuxin Formation	China	A gobiconodontid eutriconodontan. The type species is F. changi. Announced in 2019; the final article version was published in 2020.	
Kryoparvus	Gen. et sp. nov	Valid	Rich et al.	Early Cretaceous (late Barremian to early Aptian)		Australia	A possible Ausktribosphenidae?. Type species is K. gerriti.	
Origolestes	Gen. et sp. nov		Mao et al.	Early Cretaceous (Aptian)	Yixian Formation	China	A zhangheotheriid. Type species O. lii. Announced in 2019; the final article version was published in 2020.	
Stirtodon	Gen. et sp. nov	Valid	Rich, Flannery & Vickers-Rich	Early Cretaceous (Albian)	Griman Creek Formation	Australia	A monotreme. The type species is S. elizabethae.	
Sundrius	Gen. et sp. nov	In press	Rich et al.	Early Cretaceous (Albian)	Eumeralla Formation	Australia	A possible monotreme. The type species is S. ziegleri.	
Triconodon averianovi	Sp. nov	valid	Jäger, Cifelli & Martin	Early Cretaceous (Berriasian)	Lulworth Formation	United Kingdom	A triconodonid Eutriconodontan	

=== Miscellaneous mammalian research ===
- A study on the phylogenetic relationships of Mesozoic mammals, aiming to determine the morphological character complexes with a high potential to introduce phylogenetic error, is published by Celik & Phillips (2020).
- A study on maximum lifespans and blood flow rates of Morganucodon and Kuehneotherium, evaluating their implications for the knowledge of basal and maximum metabolic rates in these taxa, is published by Newham et al. (2020); their conclusions are subsequently contested by Meiri & Levin (2022).
- A study on the jaw morphology, jaw movement and occlusion in Priacodon, and on its implications for the knowledge of the occlusal mode and likely diet of triconodontids in general, is published by Jäger, Cifelli & Martin (2020).

== General research ==
- A study on the phylogenetic relationships of the haramiyidans and on the consistency between the known morphology and age of Juramaia and other mammaliaforms from the Yanliao Biota, as indicated by Bayesian tip-dated phylogenetic methods, is published by King & Beck (2020).
- A study on the community-level response of North American mammals to Paleocene–Eocene Thermal Maximum is published by Fraser & Lyons (2020).
- A study aiming to determine resource and habitat use, niche occupation and trophic interactions of mammals living during the Great American Interchange, as indicated by carbon and oxygen stable isotope compositions of tooth enamel of fossil mammals from the late Miocene to the late Pleistocene of the Pampean region of Argentina, is published by Domingo et al. (2020).
- A study on predator richness in mammalian communities from the Miocene Santa Cruz Formation (Argentina), aiming to determine whether the mammalian predator guild from this area was impoverished prior to the Great American Interchange, is published by Rodríguez-Gómez et al. (2020).
- A study on the causes of the asymmetrical character of the Great American Biotic Interchange, with an increasing dominance of mammals of North American origin in South America during the Pleistocene, is published by Carrillo et al. (2020), who argue that the asymmetry was caused by higher extinction of mammals with South American origin, which in turn reduced the diversity of South American taxa that dispersed into North America.
- A study on environmental changes in Southeast Asia from the Early Pleistocene to the Holocene, based on stable isotope data from Southeast Asian mammals, and on their impact on the evolution of mammals (including hominins), is published by Louys & Roberts (2020).
- A study on changes of mammalian extinction rates over the past 126,000 years, aiming to determine whether, and to what extent, species extinctions during this time period can be attributed to anthropogenic or to climatic factors, is published by Andermann et al. (2020).
