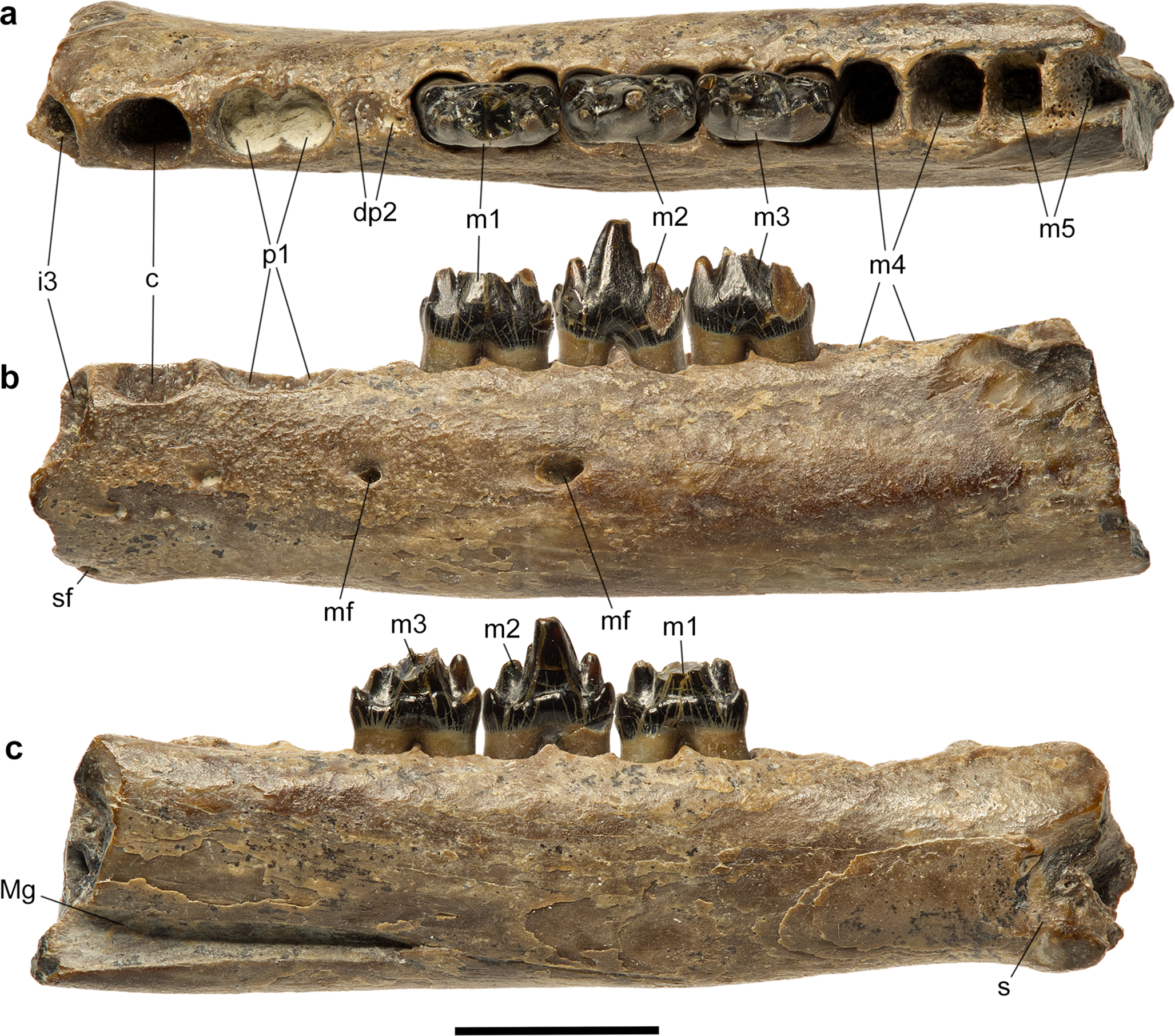
- Holotype specimen

Scientific classification
- Kingdom: Animalia
- Phylum: Chordata
- Class: Mammalia
- Order: †Eutriconodonta (?)
- Family: †Gobiconodontidae
- Genus: †Westphalodon; Martin et al., 2026
- Species: †W. goini

Binomial name
- †Westphalodon goini Martin et al., 2026

= Westphalodon =

Westphalodon Temporal range: Early Cretaceous, Barremian–Aptian

Genus of extinct mammal

Westphalodon is an extinct genus of mammal in the family Gobiconodontidae, known from the Early Cretaceous (Barremian–Aptian ages) Busche quarry (Balve-Beckum locality) of Germany. The genus contains a single species, Westphalodon goini, known from two partial dentaries (lower jaw bones), one of which preserves teeth. It is the largest mammal known from the locality from which it was collected, and one of the largest mammals from the Mesozoic of Europe.
