= Bibimys chacoensis =

Conservation status
- Least Concern (IUCN 3.1)

Scientific classification
- Kingdom: Animalia
- Phylum: Chordata
- Class: Mammalia
- Order: Rodentia
- Family: Cricetidae
- Subfamily: Sigmodontinae
- Genus: Bibimys
- Species: B. chacoensis

Binomial name
- Bibimys chacoensis (Shamel, 1931)

Synonyms
- Akodon chacoensis

Species of rodent

Bibimys chacoensis is a species of small rodent of the family Cricetidae living in the north-central part of Southern Cone of South America. The common name of this species is Chaco crimson-nosed rat (in Spanish: ratón de hocico rosado norteño [Northern pink-nosed mouse]). It is one of the three species currently recognized under the genus Bibimys.

The species was described in 1931 by zoologist Harold H. Shamel, under the denomination of Akodon chacoensis. The etymology of this species is a toponym for the locality where the type material was collected, Chaco Province in Argentina. The exact locality in the label is: "Las Palmas, provincia del Chaco, Argentina". In 1980, Argentinian mammalogist Elio Massoia transferred it to the genus Bibimys.

Bibimys chacoensis is considered to be an endemic species of the gallery forests and open spaces of the Humid Chaco region between the provinces of Formosa Province, Chaco, and Misiones Province. It has been also reported from Paraguay.

According to the IUCN Red List of Threatened Species, Bibimys chacoensis is listed as a species of least concern. However, Argentinian conservationist Juan Carlos Chebez (1962 - 2011) placed this species under threat in a paper published in 2009. Very little is known about the reproduction, maternal care, lifespan, longevity, behaviour, and economic impact of this species.
