= Bibimys torresi =

Conservation status
- Vulnerable (IUCN 3.1)

Scientific classification
- Kingdom: Animalia
- Phylum: Chordata
- Class: Mammalia
- Infraclass: Placentalia
- Order: Rodentia
- Family: Cricetidae
- Subfamily: Sigmodontinae
- Genus: Bibimys
- Species: B. torresi

Binomial name
- Bibimys torresi Massoia, 1979

Species of rodent

Bibimys torresi, also known as Torres's crimson-nosed rat, is a species of rodent in the family Cricetidae. It is found in Argentina.
