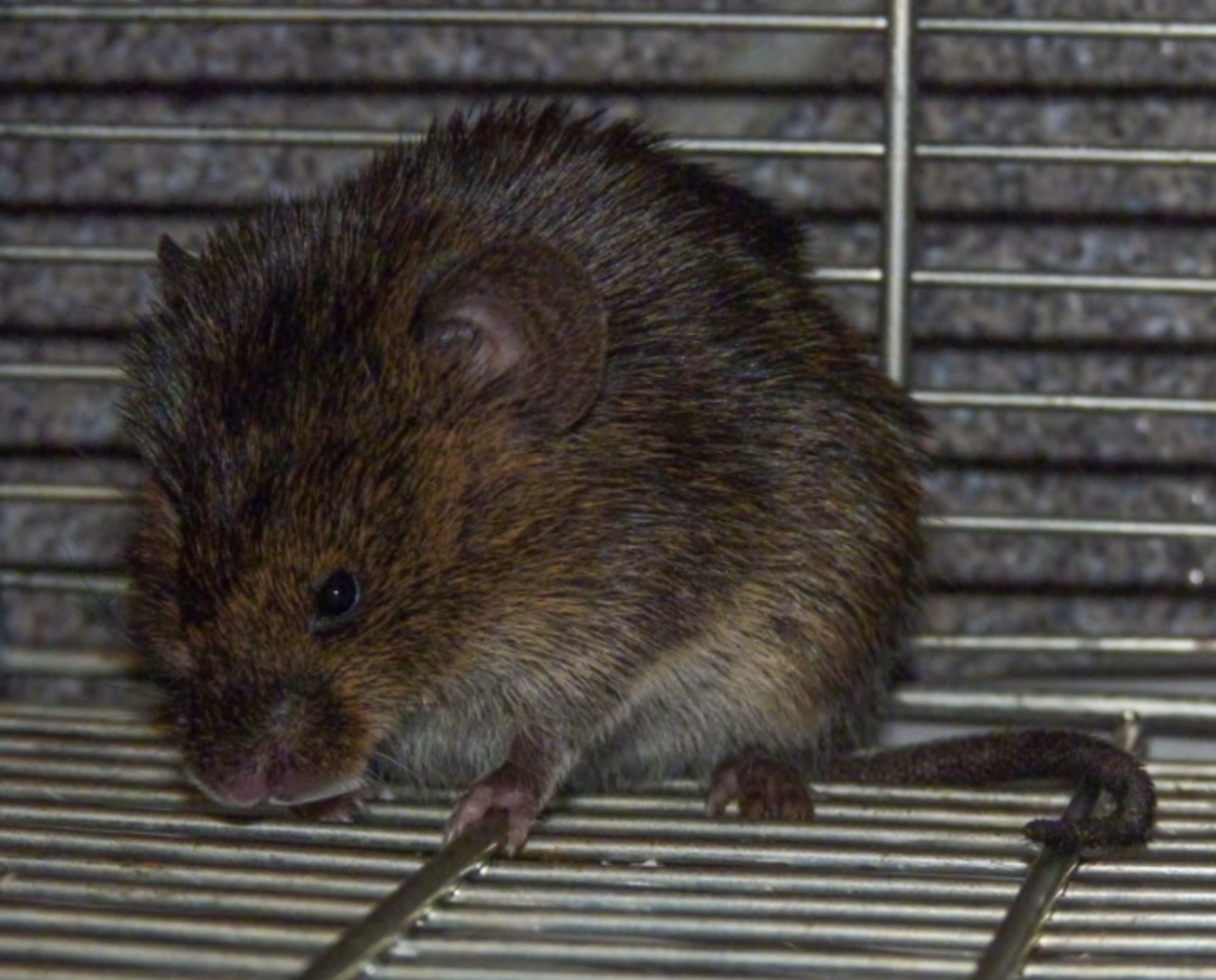
- Bibimys labiosus

Conservation status
- Least Concern (IUCN 3.1)

Scientific classification
- Kingdom: Animalia
- Phylum: Chordata
- Class: Mammalia
- Infraclass: Placentalia
- Order: Rodentia
- Family: Cricetidae
- Subfamily: Sigmodontinae
- Genus: Bibimys
- Species: B. labiosus

Binomial name
- Bibimys labiosus (Winge, 1887)

Synonyms
- Akodon labiosus

= Bibimys labiosus =

Species of rodent

Bibimys labiosus, also known as the large-lipped crimson-nosed rat, is a species of rodent in the family Cricetidae. It is found in Brazil and Argentina.
