= Hangjinia =

Hangjinia Temporal range: Early Cretaceous

Scientific classification
- Kingdom: Animalia
- Phylum: Chordata
- Class: Mammalia
- Order: †Eutriconodonta (?)
- Family: †Gobiconodontidae
- Genus: †Hangjinia
- Species: †H. chowi

Binomial name
- †Hangjinia chowi Godefroit & Guo, 1999

Extinct genus of gobiconodontine mammal

Hangjinia is an extinct monotypic genus of gobiconodontid mammal that lived in East Asia during the Early Cretaceous epoch.

== Etymology ==
The generic name Hangjinia references Hangjin Qi, the town near which the fossil was found. The specific epithet of the type species, Hangjinia chowi, honours the palaeontology professor Chow Minchen for his knowledge of palaeomammalogy.
