= Ereberix =

Ereberix Temporal range: Early Miocene

Scientific classification
- Kingdom: Animalia
- Phylum: Chordata
- Class: Mammalia
- Order: Eulipotyphla
- Family: Erinaceidae
- Genus: †Ereberix
- Species: †E. erebericulus

Binomial name
- †Ereberix erebericulus Lopatin, 2020

Extinct genus of mammals

Ereberix is an extinct genus of brachyericine that lived during the Early Miocene.

== Distribution ==
Ereberix erebericulus is known from the Loh Formation of Mongolia.
