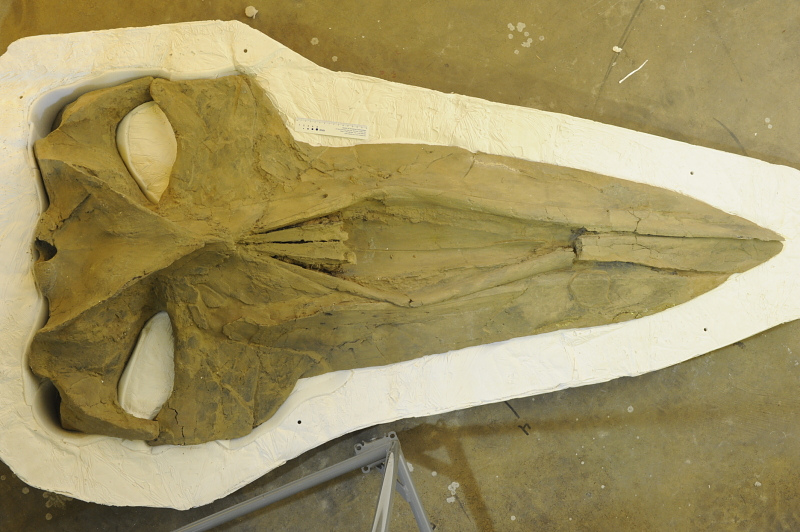
- A. patulus skull

Scientific classification
- Kingdom: Animalia
- Phylum: Chordata
- Class: Mammalia
- Order: Artiodactyla
- Infraorder: Cetacea
- Parvorder: Mysticeti
- Clade: Chaeomysticeti
- Genus: †Atlanticetus; Bisconti et al., 2020

Type species
- †Aglaocetus patulus Kellogg, 1968

Species
- †A. patulus (Kellogg, 1968) (type); †A. lavei Bisconti et al., 2020

= Atlanticetus =

Atlanticetus Temporal range: Early Miocene ~20.4–16 Ma

Extinct genus of whales

Atlanticetus is a genus of extinct baleen whales known from the Early Miocene of Italy and the US Eastern Seaboard.

== Species ==
The type species, Atlanticetus patulus was originally described as Aglaocetus patulus from the Calvert Formation by Remington Kellogg in 1968. However, it was recovered by Bisconti et al. (2013) in a different phylogenetic position than the Aglaocetus type species Aglaocetus moreni. In 2020, A. patulus was made the type species of a new genus Atlanticetus. A second species, A. lavei, is known from the early Miocene Gruppo Pietra da Cantoni of Piedmont, Italy.
