= P. David Polly =

American paleontologist (born 1966)

- Born: 1966 (age 59–60); Jefferson City, Missouri
- Education: BA, PhD
- Alma mater: University of Texas at Austin; University of California, Berkeley
- Known for: work on fossil Carnivora and Creodonta, quantitative evolution, geometric morphometrics
- Awards: Joseph T. Gregory Award 2001; President, Society of Vertebrate Paleontology 2016–2018; Fellow, American Association for the Advancement of Science 2021
- Scientific career
- Fields: Vertebrate Paleontology, Evolutionary Biology
- Institutions: Indiana University; Queen Mary, University of London; Natural History Museum, London; University of Michigan
- Doctoral advisor: William A. Clemens, Jr.
- Website: earth.indiana.edu/directory/faculty/polly-p.html

Paul David Polly is an American paleontologist and the Robert R. Shrock Professor in the Department of Earth and Atmospheric Sciences at Indiana University as well as the sitting chair of the department.

== Research ==
Polly's research focuses on quantitative evolution, phylogeny, and paleoecology of vertebrates. Much of his work has been on the phylogenetics and functional evolution of mammals, especially Carnivora and Creodonta, on the correspondence between phenotypic and genetic differentiation, on the role of functional traits in structuring mammalian communities, and on the evolution of multivariate quantitative morphological traits. With lead author Jason Head and other co-authors, he helped describe the giant fossil snake Titanoboa and the associated methods for estimating paleotemperature from the size of extinct reptiles.

== Education and organisational affiliations ==
Polly received a BA from the Plan II Honors program at University of Texas at Austin in 1987 and a PhD in Paleontology from the Department of Integrative Biology at University of California, Berkeley in 1993 for his work on the phylogeny of creodonts. He was then a member of the Michigan Society of Fellows from 1994 to 1996, and on the faculty of the St. Bartholomew's and Royal London School of Medicine and Dentistry, and later the School of Biological Sciences, at Queen Mary, University of London from 1997 to 2006. He moved to Indiana University in 2006. In 2021 he became a Fellow of the American Association for the Advancement of Sciences (AAAS).

Polly served as president of the Society of Vertebrate Paleontology from 2016 through 2018. During Polly's term as SVP president, US President Donald Trump and Interior Secretary Ryan Zinke downsized two national monuments that protect vertebrate paleontological resources, Grand Staircase–Escalante and Bears Ears national monuments. Polly was involved in lawsuits by SVP to reverse those actions, which are currently ongoing.

== Work on early website, awards ==
With Robert P. Guralnick and Allen Collins, Polly started one of the first 50 websites in the world in 1993, the University of California Museum of Paleontology site. In 2001, Polly received the Joseph T. Gregory Award from the Society of Vertebrate Paleontology for putting the society on the web and developing an online abstract submission system.
