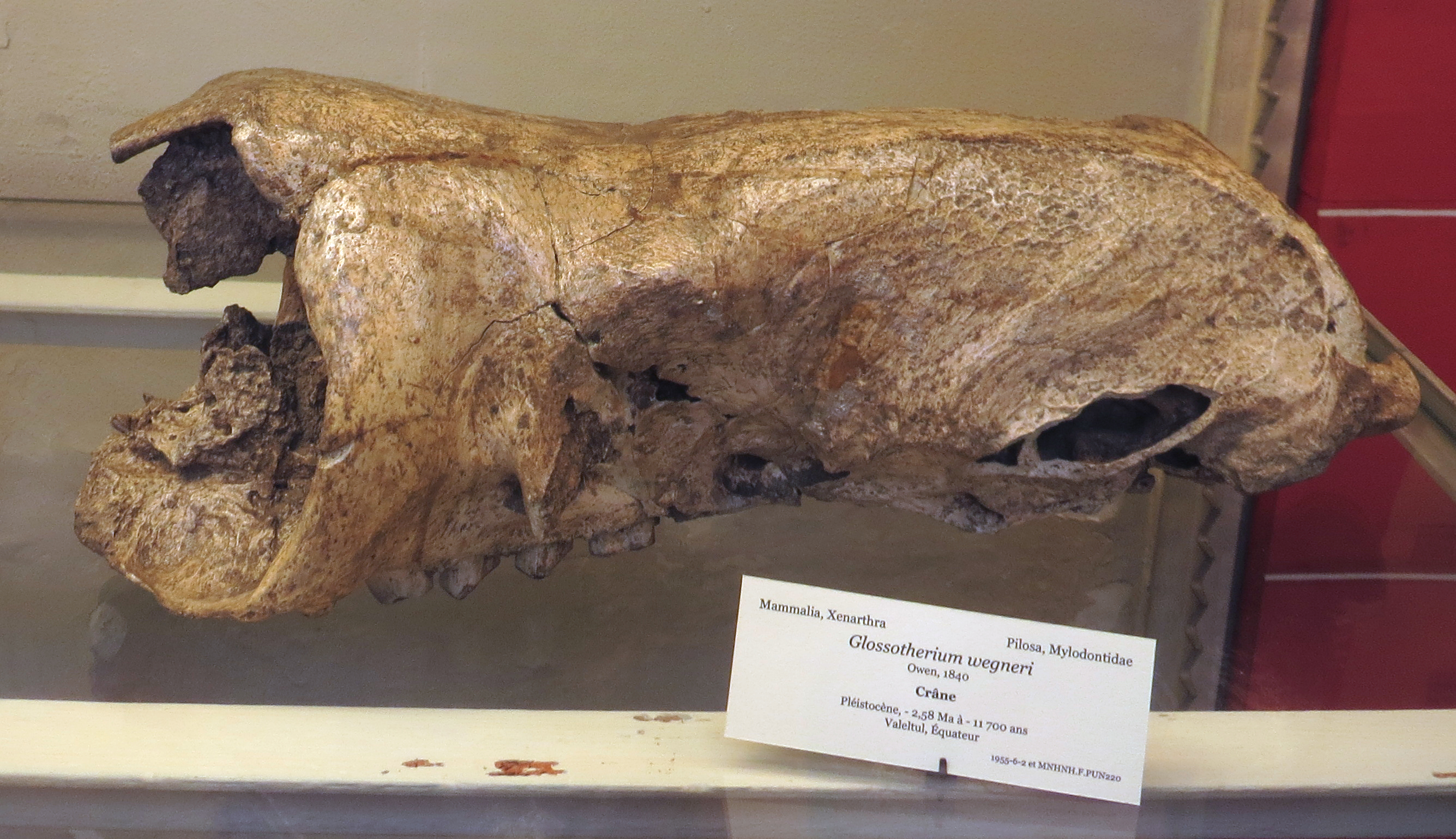
- Skull of Oreomylodon

Scientific classification
- Kingdom: Animalia
- Phylum: Chordata
- Class: Mammalia
- Infraclass: Placentalia
- Order: Pilosa
- Suborder: Folivora
- Family: †Mylodontidae
- Subfamily: †Mylodontinae
- Genus: †Oreomylodon; Hoffstetter 1949

Species
- O. wegneri Spillmann 1931

= Oreomylodon =

Oreomylodon Temporal range: Late Pleistocene ~0.129–0.011 Ma

Extinct genus of sloths

Oreomylodon is an extinct genus of ground sloth in the family Mylodontidae, endemic to Ecuador during the Pleistocene. The only species, O. wegneri, was long considered to be either a species or subgenus of Glossotherium (as G. wegneri) or a junior synonym of Glossotherium robustum, but studies of its cranial anatomy published in 2019 have supported Oreomylodon as a valid genus, and suggested it is more closely related to Paramylodon. However, a subsequent analysis published in 2020 again sank Oreomylodon wegneri into Glossotherium, as a distinct species.

== Palaeoecology ==
O. wegneri shows adaptations to living in a high-altitude habitat, and its fossils have frequently been unearthed in the Interandean Valles of Ecuador, at elevations of between 2,450 and 3,100 meters. This is in contrast to the closely related Glossotherium tropicorum, which was restricted to coastal lowland environments, suggesting substantial ecological differences between the two.
