= Prolistriodon =

Prolistriodon Temporal range: Burdigalian

Scientific classification
- Kingdom: Animalia
- Phylum: Chordata
- Class: Mammalia
- Infraclass: Placentalia
- Order: Artiodactyla
- Family: Suidae
- Subfamily: †Listriodontinae
- Genus: †Prolistriodon
- Species: †P. smyrnensis

Binomial name
- †Prolistriodon smyrnensis Pickford et al., 2020

Extinct genus of mammals

Prolistriodon is an extinct genus of listriodontine suid that lived in Anatolia during the Burdigalian stage of the Neogene period.

== Distribution ==
Prolistriodon smyrnensis is known from Sabuncubeli, a site belonging to the Soma Formation of Turkey.
