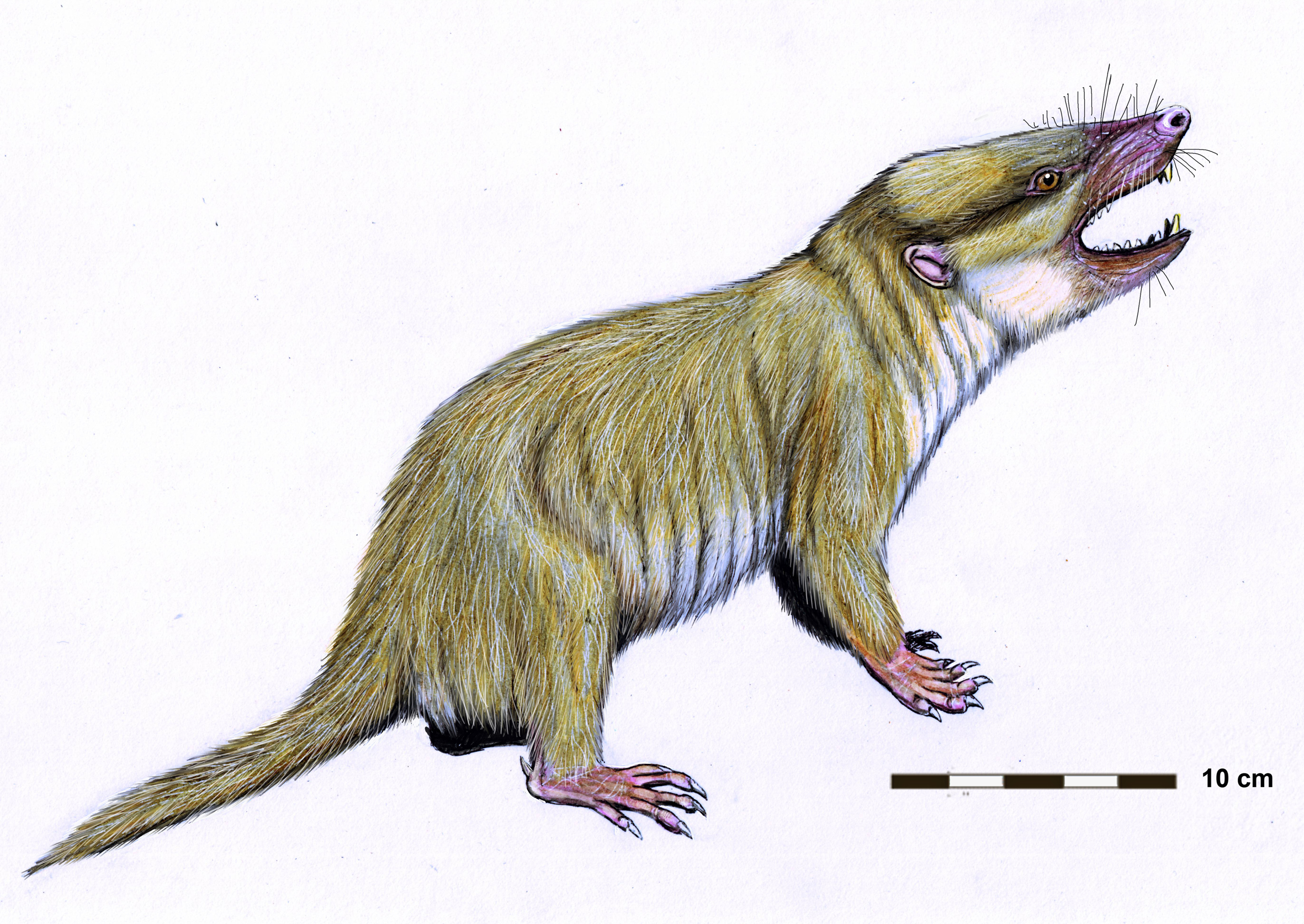
- Life restoration of Gobiconodon

Scientific classification
- Kingdom: Animalia
- Phylum: Chordata
- Class: Mammalia
- Order: †Eutriconodonta (?)
- Family: †Gobiconodontidae; Jenkins Jr. & Schaff, 1988

Genera
- Fuxinoconodon; Gobiconodon Trofimov, 1978; Hangjinia Godefroit & Guo, 1999; Huasteconodon Montellano et al., 2008; Meemannodon Meng et al., 2005; Repenomamus Li et al., 2000; Spinolestes Martin et al., 2015; Westphalodon Martin et al., 2026

= Gobiconodontidae =

Gobiconodontidae Temporal range: 184–94 Ma

Extinct family of mammals

Gobiconodontidae is a family of extinct mammals that ranged from the mid-Jurassic to the early Late Cretaceous, though most common during the Early Cretaceous. The Gobiconodontids form a diverse lineage of carnivorous non-therian mammals, and include some of the best preserved Mesozoic mammal specimens.

== Biology ==
Like many other non-therian mammals, gobiocontids retained classical mammalian synapomorphies like epipubic bones (and likely the associated reproductive constrictions), venomous spurs and sprawling limbs. Through Spinolestes we also know that they had fur similar to that of modern mammals, with compound hair follicles with primary and secondary hairs. Spinolestes also possesses a clear diaphragm like modern mammals, as well as spines, dermal scutes and an ossified Meckel's cartilage. Furthermore, it may also display signs of dermatophytosis, suggesting that gobiconodontids, like modern mammals, were vulnerable to this type of fungal infection.

Gobiconodontid dentition, being classically triconodont, has no analogue among living mammals, so comparisons are difficult. Like amphilestids but unlike triconodontids, occlusion happens by the molars essentially interlocking, with lower cusp "a" basically fitting between two upper molars. Nonetheless, it's clear that most if not all gobiconodontids were primarily carnivorous, given the presence of long, sharp canines and incisors, (Note: In Gobiconodon, the canine-like lower incisors outrightly replace the true canines, which are vestigial.) premolars with trenchant main cusps that were well suited to grasp and pierce prey, strong development of the mandibular abductor musculature, bone crushing ability in at least some species and several other features.

Gobiconodontids are often among the largest mammals in Mesozoic faunal assemblages, with forms like Repenomamus and Gobiconodon exceeding 2 kilos. They were among the first mammals to be specialised to hunt vertebrate prey, and likely occupied the highest trophic levels among mammals in their faunal communities. Several forms like Gobiconodon and Repenomamus show evidence of scavenging, being among the few Mesozoic mammals to have significantly exploited that. Evidence of predation on significantly larger dinosaurs is also known.

At least in carnivorous niches, gobiconodontids were probably replaced by deltatheroidean metatherians, which are the dominant carnivorous mammals in Late Cretaceous faunal assemblages. Competition between both groups is unattested, but in Asia the Early Cretaceous gobiconodontid diversity is replaced entirely by a deltatheroidean one, while in North America Nanocuris appears after the absence of Gobiconodon and other larger eutriconodonts.

At least Spinolestes had xenarthrous vertebrae and osseous scutes, convergent to those of modern xenarthrans and to a lesser extent the hero shrew. This genus may have displayed an ecological role similar to that of modern anteaters, pangolins, echidnas, aardvark, aardwolf and numbat, being the second known Mesozoic mammal after Fruitafossor to have done so.

Uniquely among crown-group mammals, gobiconodontids replaced their molariform teeth by successors of similar complexity, while in other mammals less complex replacements are the norm.

== Phylogeny ==
Cladogram after Marisol Montellano, James A. Hopson, James M. Clark (2008) and Gao et al. (2010).

- Gobiconodontidae
  - Hangjinia
  - - - ? Meemannodon
      - Repenomamus
    - - Gobiconodon
      - Huasteconodon
