= Tonomochota =

Tonomochota Temporal range: Late Pleistocene

Scientific classification
- Domain: Eukaryota
- Kingdom: Animalia
- Phylum: Chordata
- Class: Mammalia
- Order: Lagomorpha
- Family: Ochotonidae
- Genus: †Tonomochota; Tiunov & Gusec, 2021

Type species
- †Tonomochota khasanensis Tiunov & Gusec, 2021

Other species
- †T. sikhotana Tiunov & Gusec, 2021; †T. major Tiunov & Gusec, 2021; †T. khinganica Tiunov & Gusev, 2023

Extinct genus of lagomorph

Tonomochota is an extinct genus of ochotonid endemic to the Russian Far East region that is known currently from the Late Pleistocene and possibly the Early Holocene. Dental remains belonging to the genus were uncovered from fossil deposits in multiple eastern Russian caves and later formally described by Russian researchers starting in 2021. The genus name is an anagram of the extinct ochotonid genus Ochotonoma. There are four species assigned to Tonomochota in total.

Tonomochota is one of two ochotonid genera known from the Pleistocene, the other being the extant Ochotona, which contains pikas. It would have coexisted with a few extinct small mammals along with plenty of extant small mammal species in a blend of forested and open habitats.

== Taxonomy ==
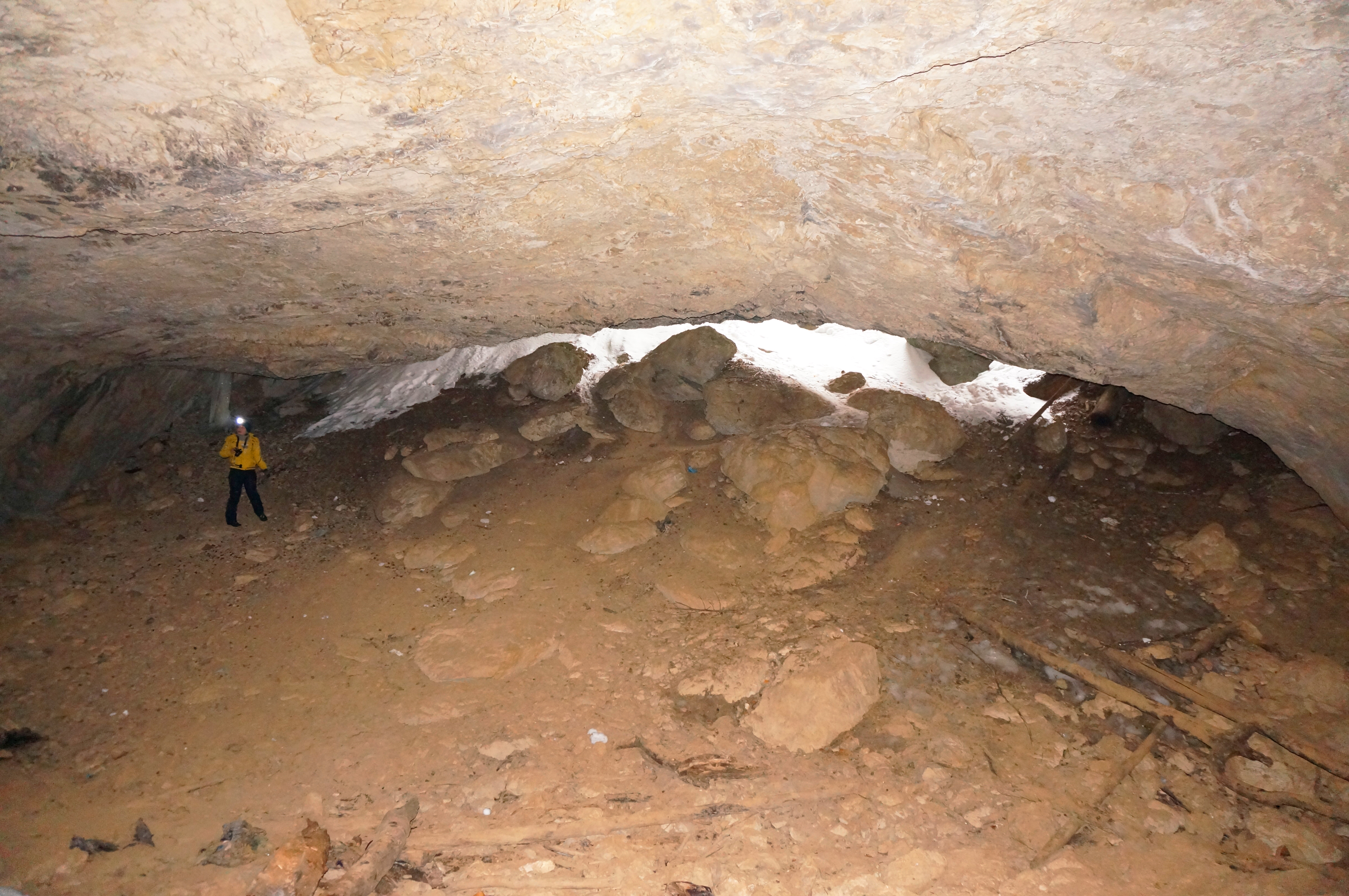
Interior of Sukhaya Cave, where dental remains of Tonomochota were found

From 2012 to 2016, paleontologists excavated dental fossils belonging to the Ochotonidae from two eastern Russian limestone caves: Sukhaya Cave and Tetyukhinskaya Cave. The fossils found in both caves date to the Late Pleistocene and may have accumulated because of predatory animal and bird activities. Excavators recovered 17 teeth of undescribed ochotonid species from Tetyukhinskaya Cave from 2012 to 2015; they later uncovered 27 additional ochotonid teeth from Sukhaya Cave in 2016.

In 2021, the Russian paleontologists Mikhail P. Tiunov and Alexander E. Gusev erected the genus Tonomochota, describing its naming origin as an anagram of the fossil ochotonid genus Ochotonoma. The type and first newly recognized species is Tonomochota khasanensis, thus making the genus type locality Sukhaya Cave; the species name derives from the Khasansky District where the cave is found. The second species that the two researchers erected was T. sikhotana from Tetyukhinskaya Cave, whose name derives from the Sikhote-Alin mountain range in Primorsky Krai where the cave is located. The third species they named was T. major from Sukhaya Cave, its name being in reference to its large size.

Another series of ochotonid dental fossil excavations were done at Korydornaya Cave at the Jewish Autonomous Oblast at Russia from 2017 to 2018. In 2023, Russian paleontologists Alexander E. Gusev and Mikhail P. Tiunov studied the ochotonid teeth and erected T. khinganica, named after the Greater Khingan mountain range in China.

=== Classification ===
Tonomochota belongs to the Ochotonidae, of which the only extant genus is Ochotona (which contains pikas). The family is divided into two subfamilies, the Ochotoninae and Sinolagomyinae. The earliest fossil record of the Ochotonidae is recorded in the early Late Oligocene of Mongolia. The Sinolagomyinae was the earlier-appearing family known initially from Mongolia and China that later dispersed to Europe, Africa, and North America and lasted up to the Middle Miocene. The Ochotoninae made its first appearance in the Eurasian landmass during the Early Miocene and was especially diverse during the Middle Miocene. During the Late Miocene, newer ochotonine genera appeared in response to drier and cooler climates that led to more open environments. The evolutionary diversity of the Ochotoninae declined beginning in the Pliocene likely due to competition with the cricetid subfamily Arvicolinae, leading to the eventual extinction of most ochotonid genera by the late Pliocene. Ochotona and Tonomochota are the only two ochotonid genera known from the Pleistocene.

== Description ==
The Ochotoninae is defined based on specific dental traits of P_{3} (third lower premolar), namely a prominent anteroconid cusp that is either round or triangular in shape and opposite shallow front and back folds (paraflexid and protoflexid). Tonomochota is diagnosed solely based on dental traits. The P_{3} tooth has a triangular anteroconid containing a cementum-filled front fold and a back fold that may or may not have cementum. The inward-facing anteroconid folds lean towards the sides. It differs from Ochotona based on the typical presence of cementum-filled side folds. It can also be distinguished from Ochotonoma and Ochotonoides by the deeper side folds that frontwards on both the front and back sides. It additionally differs from Pliolagomys by its smaller size, the presence of cementum-filled folds, and the specific connection of the paraflexid and protoflexid that results in the former being deep and the latter being shallow.

Tonomochota is described as ranging from small to large sizes relative to other members of its family. T. khasanensis is a small-sized species as well as the smallest species of its genus. T. khasanensis and T. khinganica are both medium-sized species, although the latter is larger than both the former and the northern pika (Ochotona hyperborea). T. major is a large-sized ochotonid and the largest of its genus.

== Paleoecology ==
Tonomochota is exclusively known from mountain ranges of the Russian Far East during the Late Pleistocene, the fossil deposits containing it dating back to MIS 3 of the marine isotope stages. During MIS 3, climates were warmer than the modern day and allowed for forested and rocky landscape habitats to co-occur with more open habitats. Dental records of T. khasanensis suggest that it could have lived up to the early Holocene.

Within the Tetyukhinskaya Cave, fossils of various other small mammals have been recovered such as those of the extinct squirrel species Petaurista tetyukhensis along with those of various extant species like the Amur hedgehog, Ussuri mole, Asian lesser white-toothed shrew, northern pika, Siberian flying squirrel, red squirrel, long-tailed ground squirrel, brown rat, northern red-backed vole, and wood lemming. The Korydornaya Cave contains similar small mammal fauna fossils in addition to the extinct shrew genus Beremendia but additionally contains those of large mammal fossils like the sable, red fox, gray wolf, brown bear, Siberian musk deer, moose, and wild boar.
