= Arvicola nahalensis =

Arvicola nahalensis Temporal range: Late Pleistocene

Scientific classification
- Kingdom: Animalia
- Phylum: Chordata
- Class: Mammalia
- Infraclass: Placentalia
- Order: Rodentia
- Family: Cricetidae
- Subfamily: Arvicolinae
- Genus: Arvicola
- Species: †A. nahalensis

Binomial name
- †Arvicola nahalensis Maul et al., 2021

Extinct species of rodent

Arvicola nahalensis is an extinct species of vole in the genus Arvicola. It lived during the Late Pleistocene.

== Distribution ==
Arvicola nahalensis is known from Israel.
