= Atelerix steensmai =

Atelerix steensmai Temporal range: Late Miocene

Scientific classification
- Kingdom: Animalia
- Phylum: Chordata
- Class: Mammalia
- Infraclass: Placentalia
- Order: Eulipotyphla
- Family: Erinaceidae
- Genus: Atelerix
- Species: †A. steensmai

Binomial name
- †Atelerix steensmai Van Dam et al., 2020

Extinct species of mammal

Atelerix steensmai is an extinct species of Atelerix that inhabited Spain during the Late Miocene.
