= Heleocola =

Heleocola Temporal range: Late Cretaceous

Scientific classification
- Kingdom: Animalia
- Phylum: Chordata
- Class: Mammalia
- Order: †Pediomyoidea
- Family: †Glasbiidae
- Genus: †Heleocola
- Species: †H. piceanus

Binomial name
- †Heleocola piceanus Eberle et al., 2024

Extinct genus of mammal

Heleocola is an extinct genus of pediomyoid metatherian from the Late Cretaceous of Colorado, United States. It is a monotypic genus that contains the species H. piceanus.

== Palaeoecology ==
Based on its molar morphology, in particular the low height differential between the trigonid and talonid and the low inflated cusps, H. piceanus was an omnivore whose diet was predominantly plant-based.
