= Canis borjgali =

Canis borjgali Temporal range: Early Pleistocene

Scientific classification
- Kingdom: Animalia
- Phylum: Chordata
- Class: Mammalia
- Order: Carnivora
- Family: Canidae
- Genus: Canis
- Species: C. borjgali

Binomial name
- Canis borjgali Lucenti et al., 2020

Extinct species of canis

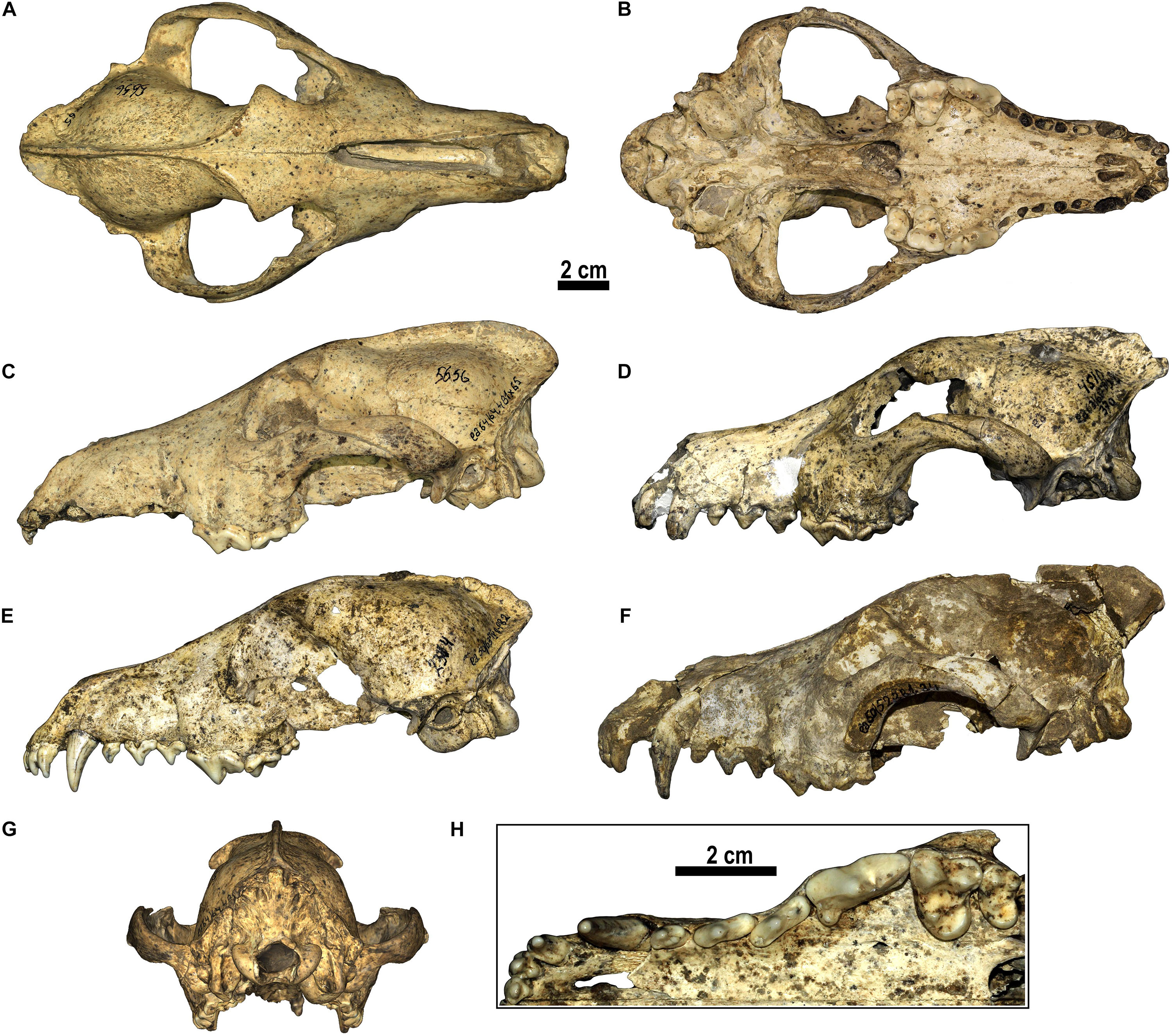
Canis from Dmanisi. (A–C, G) D5656, cranium in (A) dorsal, (B) ventral, (C) left lateral, (G) occipital views. (D) D4510, cranium in left lateral view. (E) D2314, cranium in left lateral view. (F) Dm.50/52.3B1.34, cranium in left lateral view. (H) Detailed view of the occlusal morphology of the upper teeth of Canis from Dmanisi (D2314).

Canis borjgali is an extinct species of Canis that lived during the Early Pleistocene.

== Distribution ==
Canis borjgali fossils are known from the site of Dmanisi in Georgia.
