= Nesomomys =

Nesomomys Temporal range: Eocene

Scientific classification
- Kingdom: Animalia
- Phylum: Chordata
- Class: Mammalia
- Infraclass: Placentalia
- Order: Primates
- Family: †Omomyidae
- Genus: †Nesomomys; Beard et al., 2021
- Species: †N. bunodens

Binomial name
- †Nesomomys bunodens Beard et al., 2021

Nesomomys is an extinct genus of omomyid that inhabited Turkey during the Eocene epoch. It is a monotypic genus known from a single species, N. bunodens.
