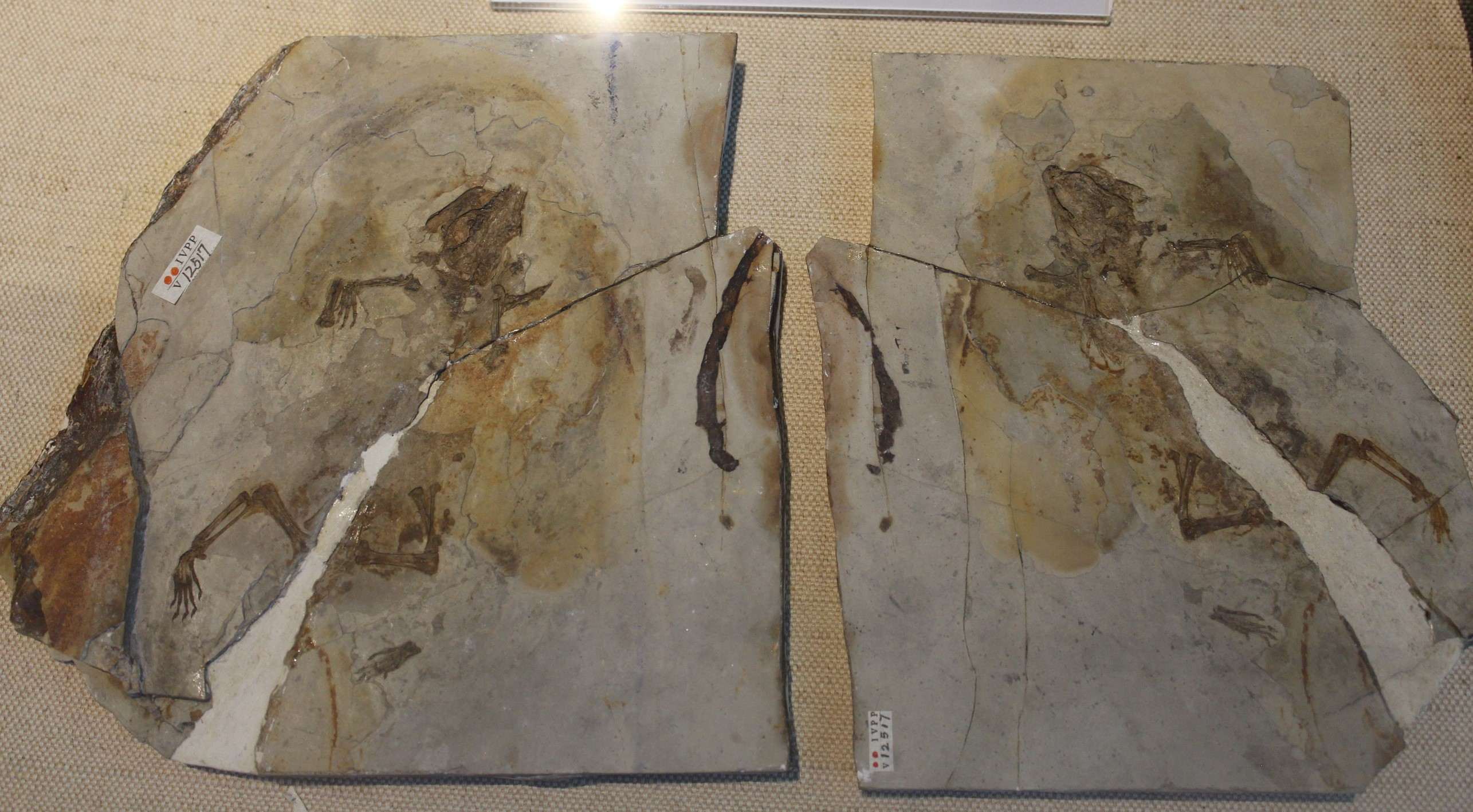
- Holotype of S. lingyuanensis, Paleozoological Museum of China

Scientific classification
- Domain: Eukaryota
- Kingdom: Animalia
- Phylum: Chordata
- Class: Mammalia
- Order: †Multituberculata
- Family: †Eobaataridae
- Genus: †Sinobaatar; Hu & Wang, 2002

Type species
- †Sinobaatar lingyuanensis Hu & Wang, 2002

Species
- †Sinobaatar lingyuanensis Hu & Wang, 2002 †Sinobaatar xiei Kusuhashi et al, 2009 †Sinobaatar fuxinensis Kusuhashi et al, 2009

= Sinobaatar =

Sinobaatar Temporal range: Early Cretaceous

Extinct family of mammals

Sinobaatar is a genus of extinct mammal from the Lower Cretaceous of China. It is categorized within the also extinct order Multituberculata and among these it belongs to the plagiaulacid lineage (a possible infraorder). Sinobaatar was a small herbivore during the Mesozoic era, commonly called "the age of the dinosaurs". The genus was named by Hu Y. and Wang Y. in 2002. Three species have been described.

It has been found in Lower Cretaceous strata of the Yixian Formation in Liaoning, China. According to Hu & Wang (2002),

"[t]he dental features of Sinobaatar show again that eobaatarids are obviously intermediate between Late Jurassic multituberculates and the later forms".

Many Multituberculata are only known from teeth, but the type specimen of Sinobaatar is a reasonably complete skeleton.

A probable tyrannosauroid specimen GMV 2124 (also known as NGMC 2124), previously attributed to Sinosauropteryx, contained a jaw of Sinobaatar in its stomach region.

== Etymology ==
The name Sinobaatar is a Latin and Mongolian mixture of "Sino–" and "Bataar" (Baghatur) and means "Chinese hero". The type species name is in honor of Lingyuan City.
