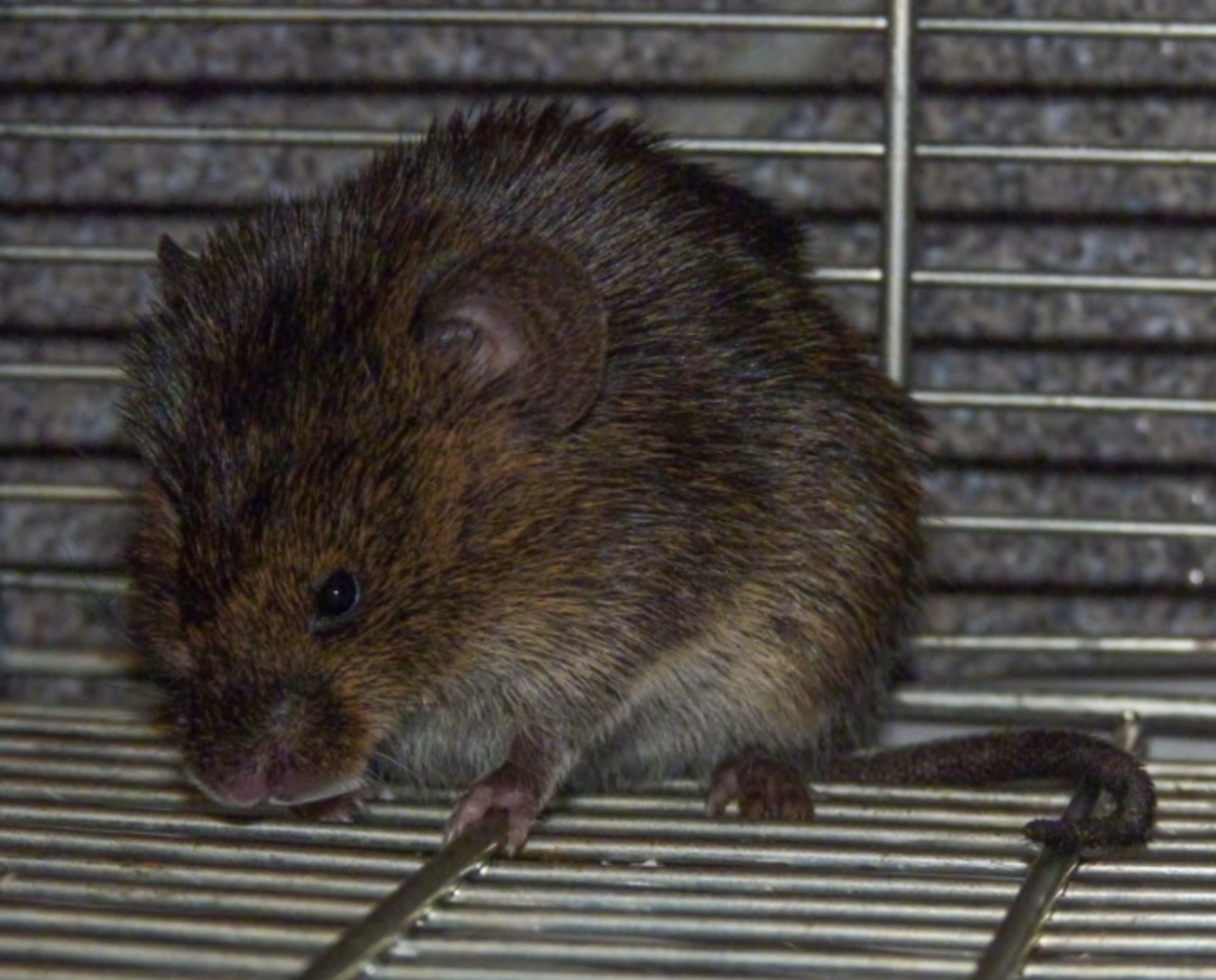
- Bibimys labiosus

Scientific classification
- Kingdom: Animalia
- Phylum: Chordata
- Class: Mammalia
- Order: Rodentia
- Family: Cricetidae
- Subfamily: Sigmodontinae
- Tribe: Akodontini
- Genus: Bibimys; Massoia, 1979

Type species
- Bibimys torresi

Species
- B. chacoensis B. labiosus B. torresi

= Bibimys =

Bibimys Temporal range: Pleistocene–Recent

Genus of rodents

Bibimys is a genus of new world rats. Commonly known as the crimson-nosed rats, there are three species:

- Bibimys chacoensis - Chaco crimson-nosed rat - found in north-east Argentina and Paraguay
- Bibimys labiosus - Large-lipped crimson-nosed rat - south-east Brazil
- Bibimys torresi - Torres's crimson-nosed rat - central Argentina

An extinct species Bibimys massoiai is known from Quaternary remains in northeastern Brazil.

Presently, species of Bibimys are found in Argentina, Brazil and Paraguay.

As with most of the species in the South American Sigmodontinae, Bibimys has been arranged as a genus based mainly on morphological differences from the other living genera. Bibimys belongs to the tribe Scapteromyini, first informally described by P. Hershkovitz in 1966 and formally introduced later by E. Massoia in 1979. The scapteromyines are a small sigmodontine tribe, consisting of the three genera: Bibimys, Kunsia and Scapteromys. Many of the species have been described from badly preserved specimens.

One of the greatest challenges lying with sigmodontine systematics is that there is much confusion and disagreement amongst authors regarding the relationship between their tribes. There are some disagreements regarding the validity of the scapteromyines and of Bibimys as a genus. In a broad phylogenetic study, Smith and Patton found that the scapteromyine genera Kunsia and Scapteromys formed a clade closely related to the Akodontini. In another study, D´Elia, Pardiñas and Myers have provisionally retained three species of Bibimys. Given the inadequacies of sample size and geographic representation, however, they acknowledged that morphological, karyotypic, and genetic evidence for their separation is unpersuasive.

== Sources ==
- David Macdonald (2001). The New Encyclopedia of Mammals. Oxford University Press. ISBN 0198508239.
- Hershkovitz, P. "South American swamp and fossorial rats of the scapteromyine group (Cricetinae, Muridae) with comments to the glans penis in murid taxonomy. Zeitschrift für Säugetierkunde 31: 81-149. (1966)
- Massoia, E. "Descripción de un género y especie nuevos: Bibimys torresi (Mammalia-Rodentia-Cricetidae-Sigmodontinae-Scapteromyni) Physis, C38: 1-7 (1979)
