= Martes crassidens =

Martes crassidens Temporal range: Early Pleistocene

Scientific classification
- Kingdom: Animalia
- Phylum: Chordata
- Class: Mammalia
- Infraclass: Placentalia
- Order: Carnivora
- Family: Mustelidae
- Genus: Martes
- Species: †M. crassidens

Binomial name
- †Martes crassidens Jiangzuo et al., 2021

Extinct species of mammal

Martes crassidens is an extinct species of Martes that lived in China during the Early Pleistocene.
