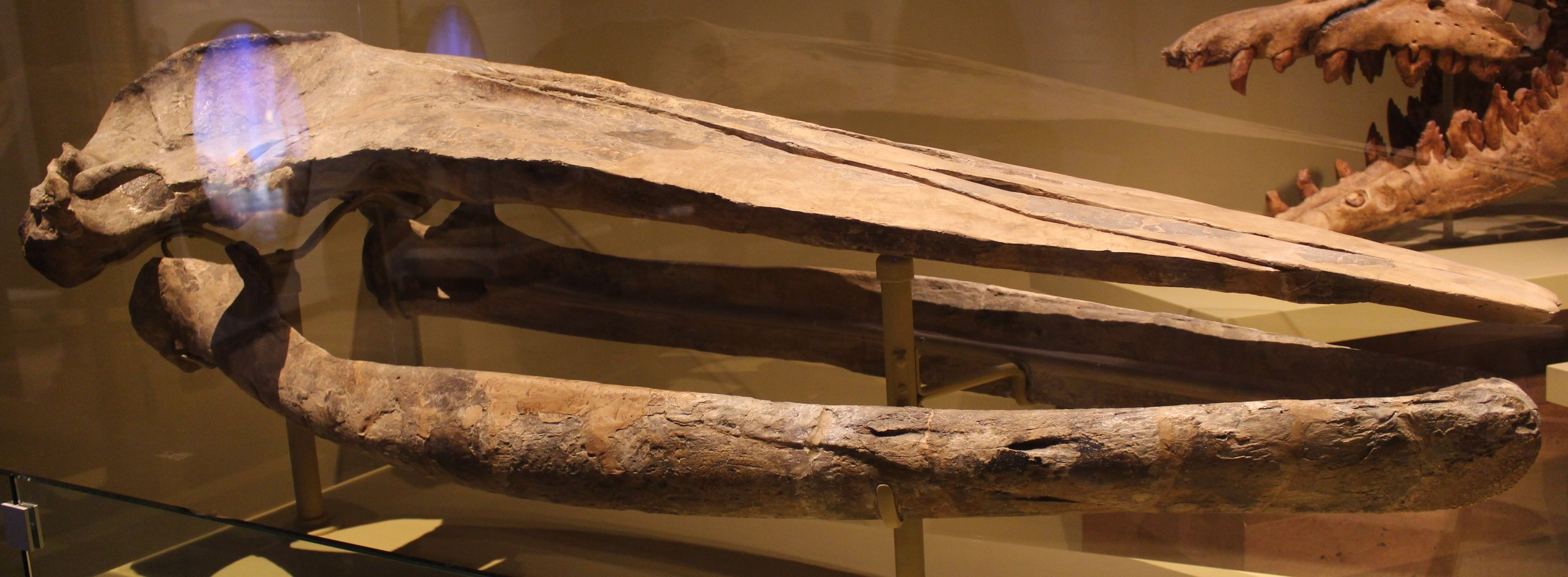
- A. moreni skull

Scientific classification
- Domain: Eukaryota
- Kingdom: Animalia
- Phylum: Chordata
- Class: Mammalia
- Order: Artiodactyla
- Infraorder: Cetacea
- Superfamily: Balaenopteroidea
- Family: †Aglaocetidae; Steeman 2007
- Genus: †Aglaocetus; Kellogg 1934

Species
- A. latifrons (van Beneden 1880); A. longifrons (van Beneden 1880); A. moreni (Lydekker 1894) (type); A. rotundus (van Beneden 1880)

Synonyms
- Amphicetus rotundus van Beneden 1880; Cetotherium moreni Lydekker 1894; Idiocetus longifrons; Mesocetus latifrons; Plesiocetus longifrons; Plesiocetus latifrons

= Aglaocetus =

Aglaocetus Temporal range: Early-Late Miocene ~20.4–7.2 Ma

Extinct genus of mammals

Aglaocetus is a genus of extinct baleen whales known from the Miocene of Patagonia, the US Eastern Seaboard, Japan and the Low Countries. It was once considered a member of Cetotheriidae along with many other putative cetotheres, but was recently recognized as representing a distinct family from true Cetotheriidae.

== Species ==
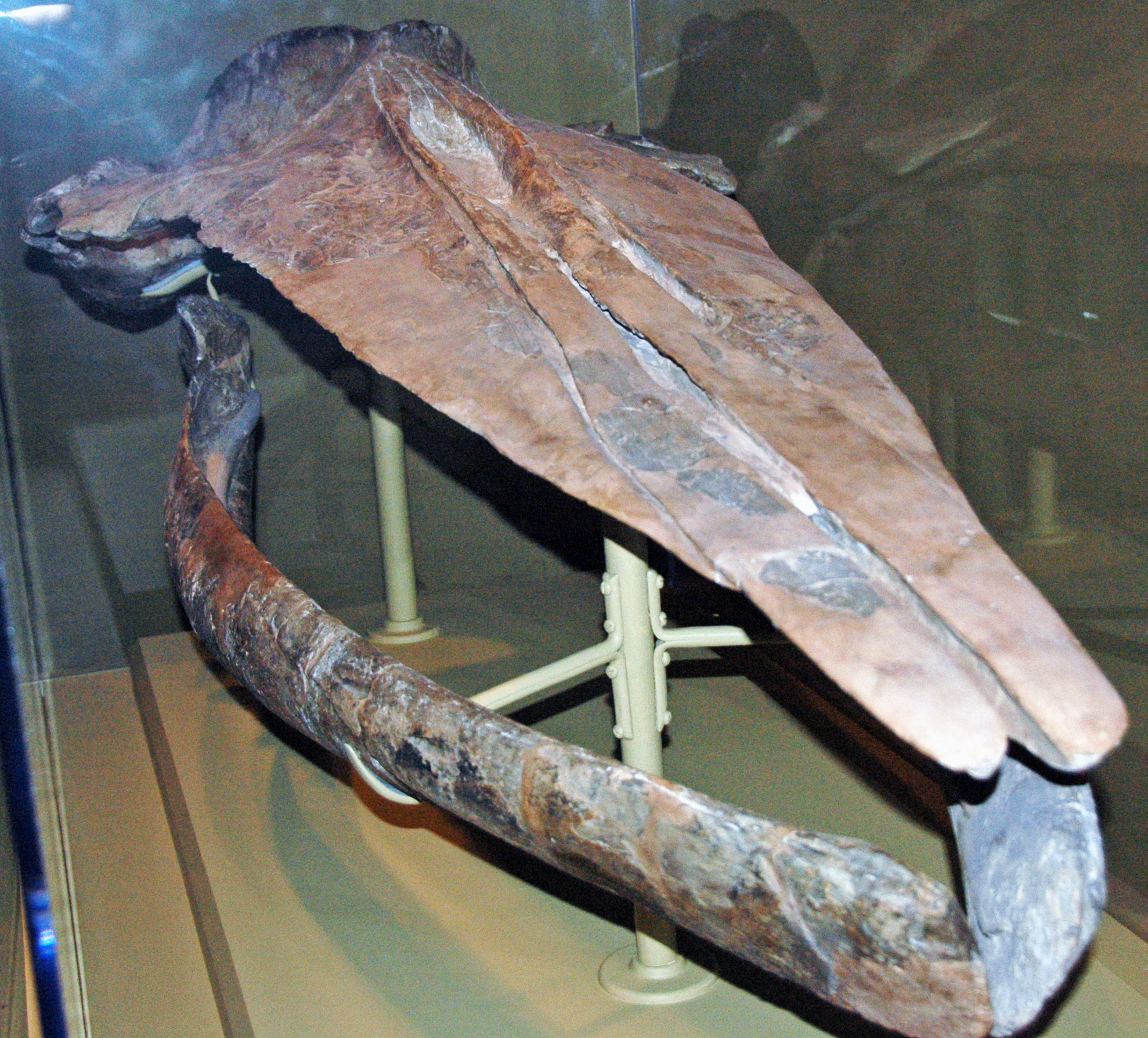
Front view of A. moreni skull

There are three currently recognized valid species: Aglaocetus moreni, A. latifrons, and A. rotundus.

The type species, Aglaocetus moreni, was originally described as a species of Cetotherium, but later recognized as generically distinct from the latter. "Aglaocetus" patulus, described from the Calvert Formation by Remington Kellogg in 1968, was recovered by Bisconti et al. (2013) in a different phylogenetic position than the Aglaocetus type species. In 2020, A. patulus was renamed Atlanticetus.

== Distribution ==
Fossils of Aglaocetus have been found in:

Miocene

- Gaimán Formation (Colhuehuapian-Santacrucian), Argentina
- Diest and Berchem Formations, Belgium
- Eibergen Member, Netherlands
