= Fuxinoconodon =

Fuxinoconodon Temporal range: Early Cretaceous

Scientific classification
- Kingdom: Animalia
- Phylum: Chordata
- Class: Mammalia
- Order: †Eutriconodonta (?)
- Family: †Gobiconodontidae
- Genus: †Fuxinoconodon
- Species: †F. changi

Binomial name
- †Fuxinoconodon changi Kusuhashi et al., 2020

Extinct genus of mammals

Fuxinoconodon is an extinct genus of gobiconodontid that lived in China during the Early Cretaceous. It contains a single species, F. changi.
