= Thermal Maximum =

Thermal Maximum may refer to:

- Cretaceous Thermal Maximum
- Paleocene–Eocene Thermal Maximum
- Eocene Thermal Maximum 2
- Early Eocene Climatic Optimum, also known as the Early Eocene Thermal Maximum
- Middle Eocene Climatic Optimum, also known as the Middle Eocene Thermal Maximum
- Middle Miocene Climatic Optimum, also known as the Middle Miocene Thermal Maximum
- Holocene climatic optimum, also known as the Holocene Thermal Maximum

== See also ==
- Thermal optimum
