= Latest Danian Event =

Hyperthermal event at the end of the Danian stage

The Latest Danian Event (LDE) was a hyperthermal event that occurred at the end of the Danian age.

== Timing ==
The LDE is believed to have lasted around 200,000 years and occurred from around 62.28-61.98 million years ago. The LDE consisted of two distinct δ^{13}C excursions, which are referred to as LDE1 and LDE2, respectively.

== Effects ==
The LDE was similar in essence to the Palaeocene-Eocene Thermal Maximum (PETM), although significantly smaller in magnitude. Seawater warmed by about 2-3 °C in both the surface oceans and the deep oceans. The LDE led to a significant shoaling of the oceanic lysocline, which is evidenced by the greatly reduced calcium carbonate preservation that occurred during the event. Significant black shale deposition occurred during the LDE, a consequence of sea level rise and clastic starvation combined with enhanced nutrient input into the ocean and anoxia.

The planktonic foraminifer genus Morozovella, especially the species Morozovella angulata, increased in abundance. Sediment core analysis from the Shatsky Rise shows that 40,000 years before LDE1, an increase in phytodetritus occurred, increasing the abundance of the benthic foraminifer Tappanina selmensis. The start of LDE1 brought about oligotrophic conditions on the seafloor, which continued through LDE2. Unlike the PETM, the LDE did not result in an extinction of benthic foraminifera. Within San Juan Basin, the warming resulted in transient seasonal drying, which was associated with the decrease in the percent toal of organic carbon, which would have resulted in decreased primary productivity. There was also an increase in the extinction rate of mammals within the San Juan Basin.

== Comparisons with present global warming ==
As the first global hyperthermal event of the Cenozoic era, the LDE has been interpreted as analogous to present-day anthropogenic global warming. Based on what happened during the LDE, researchers predict the immediate future, in geologic terms, will be characterised by significant ocean acidification and enhanced atmospheric circulation creating a smaller latitudinal temperature gradient.

== See also ==
- Palaeocene-Eocene Thermal Maximum
- Eocene Thermal Maximum 2
- Late Lutetian Thermal Maximum
- Tortonian Thermal Maximum
