= Eocene Thermal Maximum 3 =

Hyperthermal event

Eocene Thermal Maximum 3 (ETM3), also known as the K or X event, was a hyperthermal event that occurred during the middle of the Ypresian stage of the Eocene epoch.

== Timing ==
ETM3 has been dated to about 52.5 Ma. It is demarcated in the chronostratigraphic record by a marked negative δ^{13}C and δ^{18}O excursion.

== Causes ==
ETM3 was caused by a massive input of isotopically light carbon into the atmosphere. It has been suggested that methane hydrate reservoirs, recharged over millennia after melting during previous Eocene hyperthermals, were the source of this light carbon during ETM3.

== Effects ==
ETM3, in conjunction with the other hyperthermal events of the Early Eocene, led to the onset of the Early Eocene Climatic Optimum (EECO), the warmest long-term climatic interval of the Cenozoic. The diversity of benthic foraminifera decreased in the southeastern Atlantic Ocean during ETM3.

== See also ==
- Latest Danian Event
- Palaeocene-Eocene Thermal Maximum
- Eocene Thermal Maximum 2
