= ETM2 =

ETM2 may refer to:

- ETM2 (gene)
- Eocene Thermal Maximum 2
