= Middle Miocene Climatic Optimum =

Climate interval

The Middle Miocene Climatic Optimum (MMCO), sometimes referred to as the Middle Miocene Thermal Maximum (MMTM), or Miocene Climatic Optimum (MCO) was an interval between around 17 and 14 million years ago, during Miocene Epoch when the climate was approximately 3 °C warmer than today.

== Duration ==
Based on the magnetic susceptibility of Miocene sedimentary stratigraphic sequences in the Huatugou section in the Qaidam Basin, the MMCO lasted from 17.5 to 14.5 Ma; rocks deposited during this interval have a high magnetic susceptibility due to the production of superparamagnetic and single domain magnetite amidst the warm and humid conditions at the time that defines the MMCO.

Estimates derived from Mg/Ca palaeothermometry in the benthic foraminifer Oridorsalis umbonatus suggest the onset of the MMCO occurred at 16.9 Ma, peak warmth at 15.3 Ma, and the end of the MMCO at 13.8 Ma.

== Climate ==
Global mean surface temperatures during the MMCO were approximately 18.4 °C, about 3 °C warmer than today and 4 °C warmer than preindustrial. The latitudinal zone of tropical climate was significantly extended. The latitudinal climate gradient was about 0.3 °C per degree of latitude. During orbital eccentricity maxima, which corresponded to warm phases, the ocean's lysocline shoaled by approximately 500 metres.

The Arctic was ice free and warm enough to host permanent forest cover across much of its extent. Iceland had a humid and subtropical climate.

The mean annual temperature (MAT) of the United Kingdom was 16.9 °C. In Central Europe, the minimal cold months temperature (mCMT) was at least 8.0 °C and the minimal warm months temperature (mWMT) was about 18.3 °C, with an overall MAT no cooler than 17.4 °C. Central Europe's annual precipitation range was 1050–1600 mm, based on data from Hevlín Quarry in the Czech Republic. Climatic data from Poland and Bulgaria suggest a minimal latitudinal temperature gradient in Europe during the MMCO. Dense, humid rainforests covered much of France, Switzerland, and northern Germany, while southern and central Spain were arid and contained open environments. The Ebro Basin of northeastern Spain was nonetheless humid. In the North Alpine Foreland Basin (NAFB), hydrological cycling intensified during the MMCO. The Austrian locality of Stetten had a mean winter temperature of 9.6–13.3 °C and a mean summer temperature of 24.7–27.9 °C, contrasting with −1.4 °C and 19.9 °C respectively in the present; precipitation amounts at this site were 9–24 mm in winter and 204–236 mm in summer. Unusually, the bottom waters of the Vienna Basin show a marked cooling during the MMCO. Southwestern Anatolia was dominated by forests.

The Northern Hemisphere summer location of the Intertropical Convergence Zone (ITCZ) shifted northward; because the ITCZ is the zone of maximum monsoon rainfall, the precipitation brought by the East Asian Summer Monsoon (EASM) increased over southern China while simultaneously declining over Indochina, although this finding is contradicted by other studies suggesting that the East Asian hydroclimate was planetary during the MMCO rather than monsoonal. The northwestern Junggar Basin had a warm and humid climate. The Tibetan Plateau likewise was overall wetter and warmer. East Asian hydroclimate during the MMCO was predominantly governed by the 405-kyr eccentricity and 173-kyr obliquity bands.

Overall, Western North America north of 40° N was wetter than south of 40° N. The interior Pacific Northwest experienced a dramatic increase in precipitation during the MMCO around 15.1 Ma. In contrast, the Mojave region of western North America exhibited a drying trend. Along the New Jersey shelf, the MMCO did not result in any discernable climatic signal relative to earlier or later climatic intervals of the Miocene; temperatures here may have been kept low by an uplift of the Appalachian Mountains.

Northern South America developed increased seasonality in its precipitation patterns as a consequence of the ITCZ's northward migration during the MMCO. Overall moisture availability rose in the Central Andes. The Bolivian Altiplano had a MAT of 21.5–21.7 ± 2.1 °C, in stark contrast to its present MAT of 8–9 °C, while its MMCO precipitation patterns were identical to those of today.

Climate modelling suggests that North Africa would have become wetter during the MMCO. The West African Monsoon strengthened, its dynamics being governed during the start of the MMCO primarily by obliquity forcing, with this being coincident with a 2.4 Myr eccentricity minimum. The strengthening of West African offshore winds and enhancement of continental weathering in North Africa caused oxygen minimum zones to expand in the Atlantic off the coast of West Africa. The Cape Peninsula in South Africa was significantly warmer than today, and its environment fluctuated between open riparian forest and swampland.

In Antarctica, average summer temperatures were about 10 °C. The East Antarctic Ice Sheet (EAIS) was severely reduced in area, and it may have occupied as little as 25% of its present volume. However, despite its diminished size and its retreat away from the coastline of Antarctica, the EAIS remained relatively thick. Additionally, Antarctica's polar ice sheets exhibited high variability and instability throughout this warm period.

Modelling of ocean circulation shows that the Atlantic Meridional Overturning Circulation (AMOC) was strengthened by the greater inflow of waters from the Pacific and Indian Oceans due to more open Panama and Tethys Seaways. This stronger AMOC in turn resulted in a deeper mixed layer. The Antarctic Circumpolar Current (ACC) became stronger as westerly wind stress increased and Antarctic sea ice diminished in extent.

== Causes ==
The global warmth of the MMCO resulted from its elevated atmospheric carbon dioxide concentrations relative to the rest of the Neogene. Boron-based records indicate pCO_{2} varied between 300 and 500 ppm during the MMCO. A MMCO pCO_{2} estimate of 852 ± 86 ppm has been derived from palaeosols in Railroad Canyon, Idaho. The primary cause of this high pCO_{2} is generally accepted to be elevated volcanic activity. Hydrothermal alteration by magmatic dikes and sills of sediments rich in organic carbon further contributed to rising pCO_{2}. The activity of the Columbia River Basalt Group (CRBG), a large igneous province in the northwestern United States that emitted 95% of its contents between 16.7 and 15.9 Ma, is believed to be the dominant geological event responsible for the MMCO. The CRBG has been estimated to have added 4090–5670 Pg of carbon into the atmosphere in total, 3000–4000 Pg of which was discharged during the Grande Ronde Basalt eruptions, explaining much of the MMCO's anomalous warmth. Carbon dioxide was released both directly from volcanic activity as well as by cryptic degassing from intrusive magmatic sills that liberated the greenhouse gas from existing sediments. However, CRBG activity and cryptic degassing do not sufficiently explain warming before 16.3 Ma. Enhanced tectonic activity led to increased volcanic degassing at plate margins, causing high background warmth and complementing CRBG activity in driving temperatures upwards.

Albedo decrease from shrinking deserts and expanding forest cover was an important positive feedback enhancing the warmth of the MMCO.

The nature and magnitude of organic carbon burial during the MMCO is controversial. The orthodox hypothesis holds that the increase in organic carbon burial on lands submerged by rising sea levels was an important negative feedback inhibiting further warming. This positive carbon excursion is called the Monterey Carbon Excursion, which is globally recorded but mainly in the Circum-Pacific Belt. The Monterey Excursion seems to envelop the MMCO, meaning this carbon excursion started just before the climatic optimum and it ended just after it. However, recent work has challenged and contradicted the Monterey Hypothesis on the basis of evidence showing that the MMCO occurred during an interval of low organic carbon burial, likely due to enhanced bacterial decomposition of organic matter that recycled carbon back into the ocean-atmosphere system, and that this organic carbon burial nadir contributed to the sustained warmth of the MMCO.

The slowdown of meridional overturning circulation as a result of increased sea levels, decreased water oxygenation, and labile polar ice sheets may have acted as a feedback that enabled prolonged warm global temperatures.

Climate modelling strongly suggests that there remain unknown forcing and feedback mechanisms, as the amount of carbon dioxide in the atmosphere and other known boundary conditions are insufficient to explain the observed high temperatures.

== Biotic effects ==
The world of the MMCO was heavily forested; trees grew across the Arctic and even in parts of Antarctica. Tundras and forest tundras were absent from the Arctic, though they were a prominent feature of Antarctica north of its ice sheet.

Northern North America was dominated by cool-temperate forests. Western North America was mostly composed of warm-temperate evergeen broadleaf and mixed forest. Evidence from Succor Creek indicates that floral changes in the Pacific Northwest during the MMCO were governed by eccentricity changes. In Oregon, the MMCO was coincident with a peak in ungulate morphological diversity. In spite of the climatic changes, the niches of Oregonian equids were unchanged throughout the MMCO. What is now the Mojave Desert was a grassland dominated by C_{3} grasses during the MMCO, with riparian zones being characterised by closed-canopy, humid habitats. Though C_{4} plants began to expand in the area during the MMCO, herbivores in the Mojave region were characterised by high dietary fidelity and continued to mainly feed on C_{3} plants. Sea level lowstands during the MMCO brought about the arrival of gomphotheriids to the southern coast of North America. Central America had tropical vegetation, as it does today. Terrestrial mammals in the tectonically active region of western North America experienced a surge in species originations. North American mammal faunas during the MMCO had comparable diversity levels to the ruminant fauna of the present-day Serengeti. Tupinambine lepidosaurs, notoriously thermophilic, were able to inhabit the southeastern United States.

In Europe, there was a northward expansion of thermophilic plants during the MMCO. Along the northwestern coast of the Central Paratethys, mixed mesophytic forest vegetation predominated. At the Stetten locality, spruces and firs increased in abundance during transgressive phases of precessionally forced transgressive-regressive cycles, while marshes, many of them saline, dominated by Cyperaceae and swamps dominated by Taxodiaceae prevailed during sea level lowstands. Offshore, coral reefs were able to develop in the Central Paratethys. Because of the dense, humid forests covering central eastern France and northern Germany, the species richness of these areas was high and mammals were dominated by small taxa, while the more arid Iberian Peninsula had a lower species richness and a relative absence of medium-sized mammals. In Poland, the Mid-Polish Lignite Seam was formed due to an abundance of peat-forming vegetation. Along the western margin of the Central Paratethys, primate diversity exploded, likely because of the unique mosaic of different habitats it hosted. The genus Procervulus was able to diversify its dietary habits as a result of the MMCO's effects on vegetation and ecosystem structure in Europe. Europe also contained an abundance of ectothermic vertebrates due to its much warmer climate in the MMCO compared to the present. The last crocodylomorphs of Europe lived during the tail end of the MMCO. In the Paratethys, marine biodiversity peaked at the culmination of the MMCO.

Central Asia witnessed an expansion of steppe ecosystems, with an increase in abundance in both C_{4} plants and large mammals adapted to open steppes. The MMCO may have favoured the spread of pongines into Asia by creating continuous stretches of subtropical forest that enabled the migration of these apes from Africa into Eurasia. There was a simultaneous dispersal of rhizomyine and ctenodactyline rodents along this same corridor. A dispersal of Uvaria followed a similar path through Asia and into Australasia. East Asian large herbivorous mammals substantially increased their diversity. A major radiation of C_{4} plants is observed in the Chinese Loess Plateau during the MMCO, likely because of an enhanced EASM. Forest environments in East Asia were likewise nurtured by a strong EASM, especially late in the MMCO, with tropical rainforest ecosystems emerging in mid-latitude China. In Japan, Pinus mikii was able to thrive due to warmer temperatures. The coast of southwestern Japan was predominantly populated by thermophilic ostracods.

Northern South America possessed tropical evergreen broadleaf forests. The Atacama Desert already existed along the western coast of central South America and graded into temperate xerophytic shrubland and temperate sclerophyll woodland and shrubland to the south. In eastern South America south of 35° S, warm-temperate evergreen broadleaf and mixed forest predominated, alongside temperate grassland. The MMCO played a major role in the partitioning and diversification of South America's land mammal faunas. In Patagonia, the MMCO is associated with an increased in trace fossils made by large insects, owing to the high productivity that enabled large insects to become more abundant.

In Africa, increased humidity caused an expansion of rainforests that reconnected fragmented rainforest habitats separated since the Eocene-Oligocene transition. Rapid speciation in Bicyclus representing the African continent's largest radiation of satyrine butterflies occurred amidst the climatic changes of the MMCO. African dwarf chameleons experienced the start of an evolutionary radiation towards the end of the MMCO.

== Comparison to present global warming ==
The MMCO's temperature estimates of 3–4 °C above the preindustrial mean are similar to those projected in the future by mid-range forecasts of anthropogenic global warming conducted by the Intergovernmental Panel on Climate Change (IPCC). Estimates of future pCO_{2} are also remarkably similar to those derived for the MMCO. Because of these many similarities, many palaeoclimatologists use the MMCO as an analogue for what Earth's future climate will look like. Arguably, it is the best of all possible analogues; the pCO_{2} of the cooler Pliocene has already been exceeded, while the warmer Eocene had global temperatures and carbon dioxide levels so high that reaching them would require scenarios that are no longer considered realistic or likely to occur.

== See also ==
- Palaeocene-Eocene Thermal Maximum
- Early Eocene Climatic Optimum
- Middle Eocene Climatic Optimum
- Middle Pliocene Warm Period
