= Danian =

First age of the Paleocene Epoch

- 66.0 – 61.66 Ma

Chronology
← / PETM; ← / First Antarctic permanent ice-sheets; ← / K-Pg mass extinction
Subdivision of the Paleogene according to the ICS, as of 2024. Vertical axis scale: Millions of years ago
- Formerly part of: Tertiary Period/System

Etymology
- Name formality: Formal

Usage information
- Celestial body: Earth
- Regional usage: Global (ICS)
- Time scale(s) used: ICS Time Scale

Definition
- Chronological unit: Age
- Stratigraphic unit: Stage
- Time span formality: Formal
- Lower boundary definition: Iridium enriched layer associated with a major meteorite impact and subsequent K–Pg extinction event
- Lower boundary GSSP: El Kef Section, El Kef, Tunisia; 36.1537°N 8.6486°E
- Lower GSSP ratified: 1991
- Upper boundary definition: Onset of sea-level drop and carbon isotope shift
- Upper boundary GSSP: Zumaia Section, Basque Country, Spain; 43.2992°N 2.2610°W
- Upper GSSP ratified: 2008

The Danian is the oldest age or lowest stage of the Paleocene Epoch or Series, of the Paleogene Period or System, and of the Cenozoic Era or Erathem. The beginning of the Danian (and the end of the preceding Maastrichtian) is at the Cretaceous–Paleogene extinction event 66 Ma. The age ended 61.66 Ma, being followed by the Selandian.

== Stratigraphic definitions ==
The Danian was introduced in scientific literature by German-Swiss geologist Pierre Jean Édouard Desor in 1847 following a study of fossils found in France and Denmark. He identified this stage in deposits from Faxe and Møns Klint and named it after the Latin name for Denmark. The Montian Stage from Belgian stratigraphy (named after the city of Mons) is now known to be roughly equivalent to the Upper Danian and is considered a junior synonym and is no longer in use.

The base of the Danian is defined at the iridium anomaly which characterized the Cretaceous–Paleogene boundary (K–T boundary) in stratigraphic sections worldwide. A section in El Kef, Tunisia was appointed as a reference profile (GSSP) for this important boundary. The Danian is the oldest age of the Paleocene, defined at its base by the K-Pg boundary. It is very important because the readily recognized iridium anomaly and primitive Danian planktonic foraminifers define the base of the Danian. Danian foraminiferans repopulated the Paleocene seas after the Cretaceous mass extinction (Olsson et al., 1996). The first replacement foraminiferan of the Paleogene is the Globigerina eugubina, which is used to define the base of the Danian Age (Stainforth et al., 1975). This foraminiferan replaced the Cretaceous genus Globotruncana.

The top of the Danian Stage (the base of the Selandian) is close to the boundary between biozones NP4 and NP5 from marine biostratigraphy. It is slightly after the first appearances of many new species of the calcareous nanoplankton genus Fasciculithus (F. ulii, F. billii, F. janii, F. involutus, F. tympaniformis and F. pileatus) and close to the first appearance of calcareous nanoplankton species Neochiastozygus perfectus.

The Danian Stage overlaps the Puercan and Torrejonian North American land mammal ages and the Shanghuan and lowest part of the Nongshanian Asian land mammal ages. It includes the oldest Mammal Paleogene zones, all included in the 1 - 5 group.

== Paleontology ==
Immediately following the extinction of non-avian dinosaurs, mammals began to rapidly evolve larger body sizes, with the first large mammalian predators like Eoconodon evolving in less than one million years. Numerous lineages of modern birds also survived, particularly in the area around Australia but also elsewhere, e.g. Scaniornis of the North Sea region. The oceans remained much the same as the Late Cretaceous seas, only that there was less life, few remaining marine reptiles (mostly turtles, choristodera and crocodiles), and other lesser-known animals.

There are controversial reports of ammonites (mainly of the Scaphitidae class in Turkmenistan) still being around at this time, although they did not survive the Danian age.

== Latest Danian Event ==
Close to the end of the Danian, around 62.2 Ma, occurred a hyperthermal, similar to but smaller in magnitude compared to the more famous Palaeocene-Eocene Thermal Maximum (PETM), known as the Latest Danian Event (LDE). The event, which took place over a 170–230 kyr time interval, is evidenced in the geologic record by two negative carbon isotope excursions and is believed to have led to a 2–3 °C (3.6–5.4 °F) warming of both deep and surface seawater. This hyperthermal also led to a shallowing of the oceanic lysocline, as evidenced by the significant decrease in calcium carbonate preservation.
