= Middle Eocene Climatic Optimum =

The Middle Eocene Climatic Optimum (MECO), also called the Middle Eocene Thermal Maximum (METM), was a period of very warm climate that occurred during the Bartonian stage, from around 40.5 to 40.0 Ma. It marked a notable reversal of the overall trend of global cooling that characterised the Middle and Late Eocene.

== Duration ==
The length of time that the MECO spanned is disputed, although it is known to have lasted from around 40.5 to 40.0 Ma. Depending on location and methodology, the event's duration has been variously estimated at 300, 500, 600, and 750 kyr.

== Climate ==
The MECO was globally synchronous and observed in both marine and terrestrial sequences. The global mean surface temperature during the MECO was about 23.1 °C. In the Tethys Ocean, sea surface temperatures (SSTs) have been estimated at 32-36 °C. Water temperatures off what is now Liguria rose by about 4-6 °C, while the seas off southwestern Balkanatolia warmed by 2-5 °C. The northwestern Atlantic experienced a 3 °C increase in upper ocean temperatures. In the southwestern Pacific, SSTs rose from an average of about 22 °C to 28 °C. Deep ocean temperatures were about 9 °C at the peak of the MECO. On the shallow shelf around Seymour Island, temperatures warmed by ~5 °C. The North American continental interior warmed more pronouncedly, by 9 °C from 23 °C ± 3 °C to 32 °C ± 3 °C at the peak of the MECO, followed by a decline of 11 °C after the MECO.

In Western North America, lakes became markedly less saline. The Pyrenees became hotter and drier. North-central Turkey, then part of Balkanatolia, was wet and warm. Continental Asia was once thought to have experienced intense aridification during the MECO, though more recent research has shown that this took place after the MECO, when global average temperatures resumed dropping. A lacustrine sediment core from the Bohai Bay Basin shows that the climate in the region was humid and warm.

Continental weathering increased with rising temperatures. Marine biological productivity surged as enhanced hydrological cycling delivered more nutrients to the oceans. Extensive eutrophication is recorded from the Tethys, North Atlantic, South Atlantic, and Southern Oceans.

A decline in seawater oxygen content occurred during the MECO in the Tethys Ocean. Dysoxic conditions in the Tethys lasted for about 400-500 kyr according to geochemical study of the Alano site in northeastern Italy. Evidence from the Southern Ocean indicates deep water deoxygenation developed in this marine region too. Organic carbon burial rates skyrocketed in these oxygen-poor waters, which may have acted as a negative feedback that helped restore global temperatures to their pre-MECO state after the warming ended. However, deoxygenation was not globally ubiquitous; South Atlantic sites such as South Atlantic Ocean Drilling Program Site 702 show no evidence of any shift towards dysoxic conditions. The enhanced formation of glauconites in some studied sections across the MECO is believed to in part reflect the decrease in marine oxygen content, as this disinhibited the mobility of iron and its ability to be incorporated to make glauconite.

There is evidence of ocean acidification occurring during the MECO in the form of major declines in carbonate accumulation throughout the ocean at depths of greater than three kilometres. Acidification affected the entire water column, extending as far as the abyssal zone.

== Causes ==
The MECO was marked by a notable rise in atmospheric carbon dioxide concentrations. At their peak, pCO_{2} values may have reached as high as 4,000 ppm. One possible cause of this rise in pCO_{2} was the collision of India with Eurasia and formation of the Himalayas that was occurring at this time, which would have metamorphically liberated large quantities of the greenhouse gas, although the timing of metamorphic carbon release is poorly resolved. Enhanced rates of seafloor spreading and metamorphic decarbonation reactions around the region between Australia and Antarctica, combined with increased volcanic activity in this region, may also have been a source of the carbon injection into the atmosphere. Yet another hypothesis implicates increased continental arc volcanism in what are now Azerbaijan and Iran for this surge in atmospheric greenhouse gas levels. Episodic mercury enrichments and Δ^{199}Hg excursions that indicate enhanced volcanic activity have been interpreted as evidence for the volcanic hypothesis. Some analyses have also found that the rise in atmospheric pCO_{2} was more limited than previous studies have suggested, instead proposing that the observed warming was caused by a much greater sensitivity of the Earth's climate to changes in pCO_{2} relative to today.

Diminished negative feedback of silicate weathering may have occurred around the time of the MECO's onset and allowed volcanically released carbon dioxide to persist in the atmosphere for longer. This may have come about as a result of continental rocks having become less weatherable during the very warm Early Eocene and Early Middle Eocene; by the time of the MECO, few areas of silicate rock potent enough to absorb significant amounts of carbon dioxide would have remained. The MECO warmth may have been sustained through a further inhibition of silicate weathering following the onset of warming via enhanced clay formation.

Milankovitch cycles have been suggested to have played a role in triggering MECO warmth. The MECO coincided with a minimum in the 2.4 Myr eccentricity cycle that occurred around 40.2 Ma. This 2.4 Myr eccentricity minimum coincided with a minimum in the 400 kyr eccentricity cycle; the simultaneous occurrence of these eccentricity minima likely fomented the conditions enabling the MECO's persistent global warmth.

== Biotic effects ==
Planktonic foraminifera underwent a major biotic turnover; acarinids were greatly reduced in diversity and morozovellids went extinct. Chiloguembelina is also known to have declined in abundance in the Atlantic. The range of the planktonic foraminifer Orbulinoides beckmanni, a species well adapted to warm waters, expanded to higher latitudes during the MECO. Benthic foraminifera exhibited a decline due to enhanced respiration of pelagic heterotrophs, limiting the amount of organic matter making its way to the ocean depths. Large benthic foraminifera, however, thrived, which contributed to the large increase in platform carbonate deposition observed across the warming event. Also, shallow benthic foraminifera in the Tethys, which were already adapted to seasonal shifts in temperature salinity, exhibited significant resilience during the MECO. Silicoflagellates, diatoms, and radiolarians flourished as silicic acid was supplied to the oceans in greater quantities than before. The increase in iron transport into the oceans, causing populations of magnetotactic bacteria to grow. The MECO coincided with the replacement of lamniform elasmobranchs with carcharhinids in the medium to large predator guild.

In North America, the MECO marked the high point of the Middle-Late Eocene mammalian assemblage. MECO warmth catalysed the faunal turnover leading to the rise of crown-group carnivorans to prominence in the continent's terrestrial ecosystems. Overall, the MECO led to a reduction in predator richness on the North American continent.

In Balkanatolia, lower montane forests and warm, humid lowland rainforests were the dominant biomes in what is now the middle Black Sea region of northern Anatolia.

In East Asia, a sudden increase in perissodactyl diversity is observed from the Arshantan to the Irdinmanhan, a time interval that corresponds to the MECO. This increase may be overestimated, however, due to an overcounting of genera.

In India, tropical rainforest communities experienced an increase in the abundance of deciduous taxa, owing to heightened seasonality. There was also a decline observed in mangal components of the ecosystem as a result of periodic spikes in the flux of fresh water. After the peak warming phase, evergreen taxa and mangroves bounced back, but with reduced diversity compared to before the MECO.

Rodents radiated across South America during the MECO. The plant diversity of Patagonia increased by 40% during the MECO, largely due to the southward migration of neotropical plants that mixed with the established temperate Gondwanan flora. Neotropical lineages that today only occupy the tropics reached the southernmost end of South America. Nourished by abundant carbon dioxide and a favourable temperature, this highly diverse flora reverted to pre-MECO levels of biodiversity after the hothouse concluded. The genus Piper began dispersing out of South America during the warmth of the MECO.

Coastal southeastern Australia was dominated by mesothermal rainforests, although whether or not this flora was already present before the MECO remains up for debate.

== See also ==
- Early Eocene Climatic Optimum
- Middle Miocene Climatic Optimum
- Middle Pliocene Warm Period
