= Late Lutetian Thermal Maximum =

The Late Lutetian Thermal Maximum (LLTM), also known as the C19r Event, was a hyperthermal event that occurred during the Lutetian epoch.

== Timing ==
The LLTM occurred from around 41.535-41.505 million years ago, amidst a broader cooling trend known as the Middle-Late Eocene Cooling (MLEC), and lasted for around 30,000 years. It is believed to have been a globally synchronous event.

== Causes ==
The LLTM coincided with exceptionally high insolation of the Northern Hemisphere caused by the coincidence of a precession minimum modulated by high eccentricity and an obliquity maximum, which also cooccurred with maxima in the 2.4 million year eccentricity cycle and the 1.2 million year obliquity cycle.

== Effects ==
The high solar irradiance experienced by the Earth during the LLTM caused an acceleration of the water cycle, increasing the rate of runoff and input of terrestrial sediment into the ocean. This resulted in the freshening and eutrophication of seawater. Amidst these conditions occurred peaks in the abundance of opportunistic Reticulofenestra that were less than 5 μm in size and of an assortment of opportunistic benthic foraminifera, while the oligotrophic calcareous nannofossil Zygrhablithus bijugatus was significantly reduced in abundance.
