= Early Eocene Climatic Optimum =

Climatic period during the Eocene epoch

The Early Eocene Climatic Optimum (EECO), also referred to as the Early Eocene Thermal Maximum (EETM), was a period of extremely warm greenhouse climatic conditions during the Eocene epoch. The EECO represented the hottest sustained interval of the Cenozoic era and one of the hottest periods in all of Earth's history.

== Duration ==
The EECO lasted from about 54 to 49 Ma. The EECO's onset is signified by a major geochemical enrichment in isotopically light carbon, commonly known as a negative δ^{13}C excursion, that demarcates the hyperthermal Eocene Thermal Maximum 3 (ETM3).

== Climate ==
Following some climate models, the EECO was marked by an extremely high global mean surface temperature, which has been estimated to be anywhere between 23.2 and 29.7 °C, with the mean estimate being around 27.0 °C. In North America, the mean annual temperature was 23.0 °C, while the continent's overall mean annual precipitation (MAP) was about 1500 mm. The mean annual temperature range (MATR) of North America may have been as low as 47 °C or as high as 61 °C, while the MATR of Asia was anywhere from 51 to 60 °C. The Okanagan Highlands had a moist mesothermal climate, with bioclimatic analysis of the region yielding estimates of a mean annual temperature (MAT) of 12.7-16.6 °C, a cold month mean temperature (CMMT) of 3.5-7.9 °C, and a MAP of 103-157 cm. Clumped isotope measurements from the Green River Basin and the Bighorn Basin confirm a high seasonality of temperature, contradicting climatological predictions of an equable climate under greenhouse conditions. Lake temperatures in the Green River Formation ranged from 28 °C to 35 °C, with lacustrine photic zone euxinia being prevalent. Sediments from San Diego County, California record a MAP of 1100 ± 299 mm, notably drier than the region was during the Palaeocene-Eocene Thermal Maximum. Sea surface temperatures (SSTs) off of Seymour Island were ~15 °C. The high elevation areas of Asia, Africa, and Antarctica saw elevation dependent warming (EDW), while those in North America and India saw elevation dependent cooling (EDC).

The latitudinal climate gradient is generally believed to have been smaller, which was mainly the result of a decrease in albedo differences across Earth's surface. Although SSTs are often believed to have had a shallow latitudinal temperature gradient, this is likely to be an artefact of burial-induced oxygen isotope reequilibration in fossilised benthic foraminifera. Climate sensitivity was low during the EECO.

Climate modelling simulations point to a carbon dioxide concentration in the atmosphere of about 1,680 ppm to reproduce the observed hothouse conditions of the EECO, although geochemical proxies suggest only 700-900 ppm. Stomatal density in Ginkgo leaves suggests pCO_{2} was over twice that of preindustrial levels. Additionally, methane concentrations in the Early Eocene may have been significantly higher than in the present day.

The nature of the hydrological cycle during the EECO is controversial. Evidence from German peat bogs suggests that it was highly variable, with alternations between aridity and humidity. Hydroclimatic variability in the Gonjo Basin, Tibet, was predominantly controlled by orbital eccentricity cycles. Evidence from North America, in contrast, suggests that the hydrological cycle was enhanced during the EECO, although it remained relatively stable, unlike during the earlier hyperthermals, and that the stable hydroclimate may ultimately have ended the EECO by enabling high rates of organic carbon burial in lacustrine settings.

== Causes ==
The EECO was preceded by a major long-term warming trend in the Late Palaeocene and Early Eocene. It was initiated by a series of intense hyperthermal events in the Early Eocene, including Eocene Thermal Maximum 2 (ETM2) and ETM3.

The emplacement of the Pana Formation, a volcanic rock formation in southern Tibet that may represent the product of a supereruption, has also been proposed as a source of excess carbon flux into the atmosphere that drove the EECO. Other research attributes the elevated greenhouse gas levels to increased generation of petroleum in sedimentary basins and enhanced ventilation of marine carbon.

== Biotic effects ==
=== Land ===
The final phase of the Angiosperm Terrestrial Revolution occurred during the EECO. The supergreenhouse climate of the EECO fostered extensive floral diversification and increased habitat complexity in North American terrestrial biomes. The hot, humid conditions of the EECO may have facilitated the evolution of epiphytic bryophytes, with the oldest member of Lejeuneaceae being described from fossils from the Cambay amber dating back to the EECO. The Okanagan Highlands in British Columbia and Washington became a biodiversity hotspot from which newly evolved lineages of temperate-adapted plants radiated from following the end of the EECO.

The climate was warm enough to allow palms and palm beetles to inhabit upland regions of British Columbia and Washington. Ellesmere Island became inhabited by basal primatomorphs, while Canada's Western Arctic was home to crocodyliforms. Crocodyliform diversity in North America was very high. The leadup to the EECO was marked by an increase in mammal diversity in Wyoming's Bighorn Basin. Across North America, the EECO's warmth and humidity promoted increased floral diversity and habitat complexity, which in turn increased mammalian diversity.

Northern Yakutia was covered in mangroves. Mongolia witnessed a humidification event that transformed it from a shrubland into a forest and significantly reducing local wildfire incidence.

In South America, the EECO coincided with the Itaboraian South American Land Mammal Age. Cingulates diversified over the course of the EECO.

The northern margins of the Australo-Antarctic Gulf, then located at 60-65 °S, were covered in wet-tropical lowland vegetation. Nypa pollen is recorded in southeastern Australian sediments.

The end of EECO brought faunal overturns globally.

In North America, the end of the EECO coincided with the Bridgerian Crash, which saw a drop in mammalian diversity. In Africa, the end of the EECO brought about a hyaenodont turnover. In Europe, the end of the EECO resulted in the extinction of mesonychids, oxyaenids, and viverravids. Their extinction likely led to the diversification of hyaenodonts at the Ypresian-Lutetian boundary, resulting in them becoming the dominant group of mammalian predators in Europe.

=== Ocean ===
Apectodinium became abundant in the seas, and is often used as a biostratigraphic marker of the EECO. The central Tethys in what is now northeastern Italy was a hotspot of coral diversity, with its mesophotic deltaic environment acting as a refugium. At Shatsky Rise, the planktonic foraminifera Morozovella and Chiloguembelina declined in abundance. Acarinina became the dominant planktonic foraminifer in this locality. Morozovella underwent a switch from dextral to sinistral coiling across the EECO. The euryhaline dinoflagellate Homotryblium became superabundant at the site of Waipara in New Zealand during the early and middle EECO, reflecting the occurrence of significant stratification of surficial waters as well as increased salinity. The productivity of calcareous nannoplankton increased. In the equatorial Atlantic and Pacific, Toweius declined in two phases during the peak of the EECO as Discoaster achieved peak abundance, with Campylosphaera, Umbilicosphaera, and Calcidiscus also thriving. The conclusion of the EECO in these regions was marked by their declines and the expansion of Reticulofenestra.

== Geologic effects ==
The EECO caused an increase in chert deposition by way of basin–basin fractionation by deep-sea circulation, causing increased silica concentrations in the North Atlantic which in turn resulted in direct precipitation of silica as well as its absorption by clay minerals. The Equatorial Pacific displays extensive chert deposits laid down during the EECO. The EECO was also marked by enhanced glauconite deposition. In the Arctic, carbonate platforms formed on the crests of bathymetric highs.

== Comparison to present global warming ==
Because the pCO_{2} values of the EECO could potentially be reached if anthropogenic greenhouse gas emissions continue unabated for three centuries, the EECO has been used as an analogue for high-end projections of the Earth's future climate that would result from humanity's burning of fossil fuels. Based on the Representative Concentration Pathway 8.5 (RCP8.5) emission scenario, by 2150 CE, the climates across much of the world would resemble conditions during the EECO. One scenario of Lee et al. (2021) suggests that conditions comparable to EECO could occur by 2300 CE.

== See also ==
- Palaeocene-Eocene Thermal Maximum
- Middle Eocene Climatic Optimum
- Middle Miocene Climatic Optimum
- Middle Pliocene Warm Period
