= ETM2 (gene) =

Genetic element in humans

essential tremor 2

Identifiers
- Symbol: ETM2
- NCBI gene: 2112
- HGNC: 3487
- OMIM: 602134

Other data
- Locus: Chr. 2 p25-2p22

ETM2 is a gene associated with essential tremor.
