= Tortonian Thermal Maximum =

Neogene climate event

The Tortonian Thermal Maximum (TTM) was an interval of relatively warm global climate that occurred during the Tortonian age of the Neogene period.

== Timing ==
The TTM occurred around 10.8 million years ago, during the early part of the Tortonian.

== Effects ==
Global mean surface temperature was around 61.5 °F (16.4 °C) during the TTM. Lake Pannon, the largest lake in Europe, experienced enhanced nutrient inputs that caused blooms of nannoplankton. Potamidids experienced an expansion in their geographic range, with them entering the Paratethys from the Mediterranean Sea.
