= Carbonate compensation depth =

Depth in the oceans below which no calcium carbonate sediment particles are preserved

The carbonate compensation depth (CCD) is the depth in the ocean at which the rate of supply of calcium carbonate matches its rate of dissolution. In other words, carbonate dissolution 'compensates' for the supply. Below the CCD, carbonate dissolution rate exceeds the supply rate, so carbonate particles dissolve, and the carbonate shells (tests) of planktonic marine organisms are not preserved. Carbonate particles cannot accumulate in sediments where the seafloor is below this depth.

Calcite is the least soluble crystalline form of calcium carbonate, so the CCD is normally the compensation depth for calcite. The aragonite compensation depth (ACD) is the compensation depth for aragonitic carbonates. Aragonite is more soluble than calcite, and the aragonite compensation depth is generally shallower than both the calcite compensation depth and the CCD.

== Overview ==
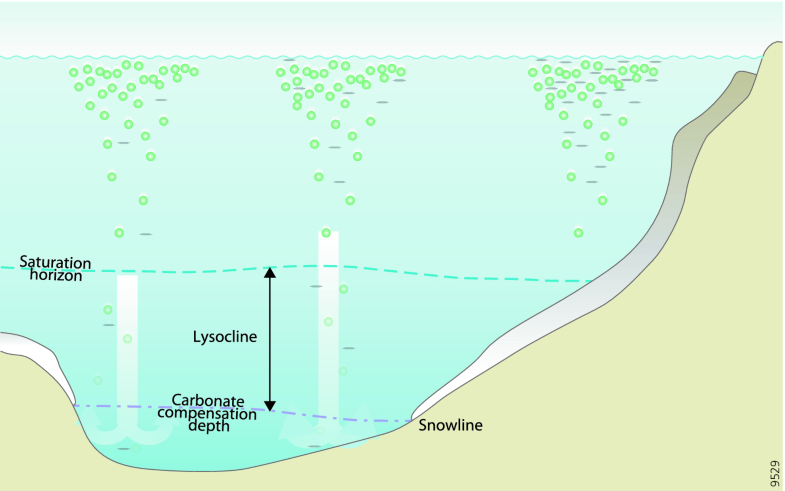
Schematic sketch of the lysocline zone and its upper and lower boundaries: – Saturation Horizon (Ω = 1): The upper boundary depth where the saturation state Ω drops to one. Below this level, waters are thermodynamically undersaturated, but kinetic factors delay rapid dissolution. – Lysocline zone: The zone where shell corrosion becomes visibly noticeable in microfossils (e.g., foraminifera, coccolithophores). Dissolution rates accelerate sharply below this zone. – Carbonate Compensation Depth (CCD): The critical lower boundary where supply rate equals dissolution rate. Sediments beneath the CCD retain less than 1–10% CaCO_{3} by weight (cf. snowline).

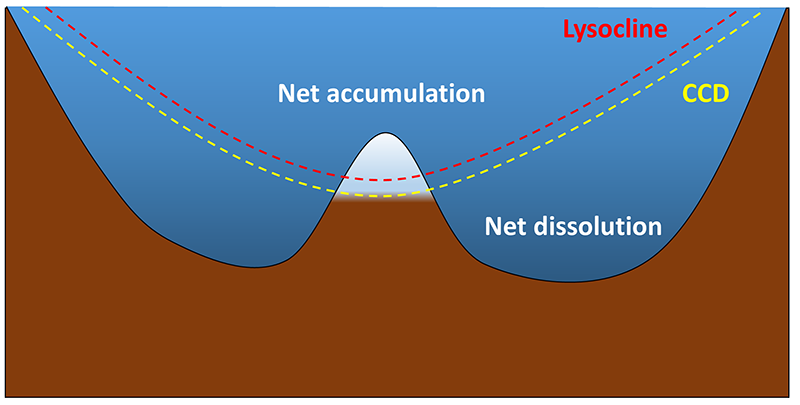
Schematic oceanic transect from the North Pole to the South Pole along a meridian line showing variation in lysocline depth with water temperature affecting both CaCO_{3} and CO_{2} solubility. Calcareous sediment can only accumulate in depths shallower than the calcium carbonate compensation depth (CCD). Below the CCD, calcareous sediments readily dissolve and cannot accumulate. The lysocline represents the depth range in which the rate of dissolution increases dramatically.

As shown in the diagram, biogenic calcium carbonate (CaCO_{3}) tests are produced in the photic zone of the oceans (green circles). Upon death, those tests escaping dissolution near the surface settle, along with clay materials. In seawater, a dissolution boundary is formed as a result of temperature, pressure, and depth, and is known as the saturation horizon. Above this horizon, waters are supersaturated and CaCO_{3} tests are largely preserved. Below it, the waters are undersaturated because of both increasing solubility with depth and the release of CO_{2} from the decay of organic matter (see also biological pump in the carbon cycle of oceans), and CaCO_{3} will dissolve. The sinking velocity of debris is rapid (broad pale arrows), so dissolution occurs primarily at the sediment surface.

At the carbonate compensation depth, the rate of dissolution exactly matches the rate of supply of CaCO_{3} from above. At this steady-state depth, the CCD is similar to the snowline (the first depth where carbonate-poor sediments occur). The lysocline is the depth interval between the saturation and carbonate compensation depths.

== Solubility of carbonate ==
Calcium carbonate is essentially insoluble in sea surface waters today. Shells of dead calcareous plankton sinking to deeper waters are practically unaltered until reaching the lysocline, the point about 3.5 km deep past which the solubility increases dramatically with depth and pressure. The CCD is defined by the horizon depth where calcium carbonate is no longer present in the sediments, having dissolved according to the reversible dissolution/precipitation chemical equilibrium essentially driven by the $P_{CO_{2}}$ value:

CaCO_{3} + CO_{2}_{(aq)} + H_{2}O ⇌ Ca^{2+}_{(aq)} + 2 HCO^{−}_{3}_{(aq)}

Calcareous plankton and sediment particles can be found in the water column above the CCD. If the seabed is above the CCD, bottom sediments can consist of calcareous sediments called calcareous ooze, essentially a type of limestone or chalk. If the exposed seabed is below the CCD, tiny shells of CaCO_{3} will dissolve before reaching the bottom of the water column, preventing the deposition of carbonate sediment. As the seafloor spreads, thermal subsidence of the plate, which has the effect of increasing depth, may bring the carbonate layer below the CCD; the carbonate layer may be prevented from rapidly chemically interacting with the seawater by overlying sediments such as a layer of siliceous ooze or abyssal clay deposited on top of the carbonate layer and slowing down the diffusion of CO_{2} in pore water.

== Variations in value of the CCD ==
The exact value of the CCD depends on the solubility of calcium carbonate, which is determined by temperature, pressure, and the chemical composition of the water – in particular, the amount of dissolved CO_{2}. Calcium carbonate is more soluble at lower temperatures and at higher pressures. It is also more soluble at higher concentrations of dissolved CO_{2}. Adding CO_{2} in excess as an additional reactant to the above chemical equation pushes the equilibrium towards the right, producing more products: Ca^{2+} and HCO_{3}^{−}, and consuming more reactants CO_{2} and calcium carbonate according to Le Chatelier's principle.

At present, the CCD in the Pacific Ocean is about 4200–4500 m, except beneath the equatorial upwelling zone, where the CCD is about 5000 m. In the temperate and tropical Atlantic Ocean the CCD is at approximately 5000 m. In the Indian Ocean it is intermediate between the Atlantic and the Pacific at approximately 4300 m. The variation in CCD depth largely results from the time since the bottom water was last exposed to the surface; this is called the "age" of the water mass. Thermohaline circulation determines the relative ages of the water in these basins. Because organic material, such as faecal pellets from copepods, sinks from surface waters into deeper waters, deep-water masses tend to accumulate dissolved carbon dioxide with time. The oldest water masses have the highest concentrations of CO_{2} and therefore the shallowest CCD. The CCD is relatively shallow at high latitudes, with the exception of the North Atlantic and regions of the Southern Ocean where downwelling occurs. This downwelling brings young surface water with relatively low carbon dioxide concentrations into the deep ocean, increasing the CCD depth.

Over the geologic time, the depth of the CCD has varied considerably. From the Cretaceous through the Eocene, the CCD was much shallower globally than it is today; due to intense volcanic activity during this period, atmospheric CO_{2} concentrations were much higher. The higher atmospheric concentrations of CO_{2} resulted in a higher partial pressure of CO_{2} over the ocean, which led to increased dissolved CO_{2} in the ocean's mixed surface layer. This effect was somewhat mitigated by the elevated temperatures in the deep oceans during this period. In the late Eocene, the transition from a greenhouse to an icehouse Earth coincided with a deepened CCD.

John Murray investigated and experimented on the dissolution of calcium carbonate and was the first to identify the carbonate compensation depth in oceans.

=== Climate change impacts ===
Increasing atmospheric concentration of CO_{2} from the combustion of fossil fuels is causing the CCD to rise, with zones of downwelling first being affected. Ocean acidification, which is also driven by rising atmospheric carbon dioxide concentrations, will enhance such dissolution and shallow the carbonate compensation depth over timescales of tens to hundreds of years.

== Sedimentary ooze ==
On the sea floors above the carbonate compensation depth, the most common ooze is calcareous ooze; on the sea floors below the carbonate compensation depth, the most common ooze is siliceous ooze. While calcareous ooze mostly consists of Rhizaria, siliceous ooze mostly consists of Radiolaria and diatoms.

== See also ==
- Biological pump
- Carbonate pump
- Great Calcite Belt
- Lysocline
- Ocean acidification
