= Eocene Thermal Maximum 2 =

Transient period of global warming that occurred approximately 54 million years ago

Eocene Thermal Maximum 2 (ETM-2), also called H-1 or Elmo (Eocene Layer of Mysterious Origin), was a transient period of global warming that occurred around 54 Ma. It was the second major hyperthermal that punctuated long-term warming from the Late Paleocene through the Early Eocene (58 to 50 Ma).

== Timing ==
ETM-2 occurred exactly 4.5 long eccentricity cycles after the PETM. ETM-2 is clearly recognized in sediment sequences by analyzing the stable carbon isotope composition of carbon-bearing material. The ^{13}C/^{12}C ratio of calcium carbonate or organic matter drops significantly across the event. This is similar to what happens when one examines sediment across the PETM, although the magnitude of the negative carbon isotope excursion is not as large during ETM-2. The timing of Earth system perturbations during ETM-2 and PETM also appear different. Specifically, the onset of ETM-2 may have been longer (perhaps 30,000 years) while the recovery seems to have been shorter (perhaps <50,000 years). However, these findings are caveated by the fact that the timing of short-term carbon cycle perturbations during both events remains difficult to constrain.

A thin clay-rich horizon marks ETM-2 in marine sediment from widely separated locations. In sections recovered from the deep sea (for example those recovered by Ocean Drilling Program Leg 208 on Walvis Ridge), this layer is caused by dissolution of calcium carbonate. However, in sections deposited along continental margins (for example those now exposed along the Waiau Toa / Clarence River, New Zealand), the clay-rich horizon represents dilution by excess accumulation of terrestrial material entering the ocean. Similar changes in sediment accumulation are found across the PETM. In sediment from Lomonosov Ridge in the Arctic Ocean, intervals across both ETM-2 and PETM show signs of higher temperature, lower salinity and lower dissolved oxygen.

== Causes ==
The PETM and ETM-2 are thought to have a similar generic origin, although this idea remains at the edge of current research. Both events were geologically brief time intervals (<200,000 years), and during both events, a tremendous amount of ^{13}C-depleted carbon rapidly entered the ocean and atmosphere. This decreased the ^{13}C/^{12}C ratio of carbon-bearing sedimentary components, and dissolved carbonate in the deep ocean. The source of this ^{13}C-depleted carbon during ETM-2 is believed to be organic carbon. Somehow carbon input was coupled to an increase in Earth surface temperature and a greater seasonality in precipitation, which explains excess terrestrial sediment discharge marking both events in continental margin sections. Explanations for changes during ETM-2 are the same as those for the PETM, and are discussed in that article.

Both the PETM and ETM-2 occurred during maxima in the short eccentricity cycle, suggesting that the events may have had to do with this Milankovitch cycle. However, the PETM followed a long eccentricity minimum while ETM-2 followed a long eccentricity maximum, indicating a qualitative difference in the orbital causes of these two events. The H-2 event appears to be a "minor" hyperthermal that follows ETM-2 (H-1) by about 100,000 years. This has led to speculation that the two events are somehow coupled and paced by changes in orbital eccentricity.

== Effects ==
ETM-2 and the other hyperthermals Early Eocene hyperthermals occurring in close temporal proximity appear to have ushered in the Early Eocene Climatic Optimum (EECO), the warmest sustained interval of the Cenozoic Era.

Continental silicate weathering increased by 18-22% during ETM-2 according to marine ^{187}Os/^{188}Os measurements, retarding some of the carbon-driven warming. Unlike during the PETM, the increases in precipitation during ETM-2 were too insignificant to buffer the global warming in any substantial way.

Sea surface temperatures (SSTs) in the Arctic Ocean rose by 3–5 °C during ETM-2. SSTs climbed by 2–4 °C and salinity by ~1–2 ppt in subtropical waters. Deep sea temperatures in the South Atlantic rose to 16.9 ± 2.3 °C from a background of 13.5 ± 1.9 °C. On land, precipitation in the Arctic around Stenkul Fjord increased, enhancing clastic sedimentation. Surface temperatures in the Fushun Basin rose by 3–5 °C while mean annual precipitation (MAP) rose by 600 mm. At the Equator, precipitation decreased, leading to a severe decline in tropical rainforests and an expansion of deciduous forests in their place.

Ocean acidification did occur during ETM-2, just as it did in the PETM, but the magnitude of the drop in pH was significantly lower. Along the Atlantic Coastal Plain, changes in local hydrology and nutrient supply were minimal, unlike during the PETM. In the Tethys Ocean, an increase in surface water eutrophication is recorded.

Anoxia was absent during ETM-2, as the magnitude of the hyperthermal was not sufficient to generate large scale marine anoxia. However, oxygen levels in many regions of the world's oceans did decline.

The marine ecological recovery from the PETM was significantly inhibited by ETM-2. As in the case of the PETM, reversible dwarfing of mammals has been noted to have occurred during the ETM-2. Unlike during the PETM, there was no change in the photosymbiont associations of the planktonic foraminifer Acarinina soldadoensis, possibly because the PETM had already selected for adaptations enabling them to withstand extreme hyperthermals or because of the lesser magnitude of ETM-2. In the Tethys, planktonic foraminifer test size decreased by 40%, while calcareous nannoplankton community sizes dropped as reflected by increased abundance of small placoliths. In the benthic realm, the fauna came under a high degree of stress due to dysoxic conditions.

== See also ==
- Latest Danian Event
- Paleocene–Eocene Thermal Maximum
- Eocene Thermal Maximum 3
