= Mid-Piacenzian Warm Period =

Part of the Pliocene Epoch

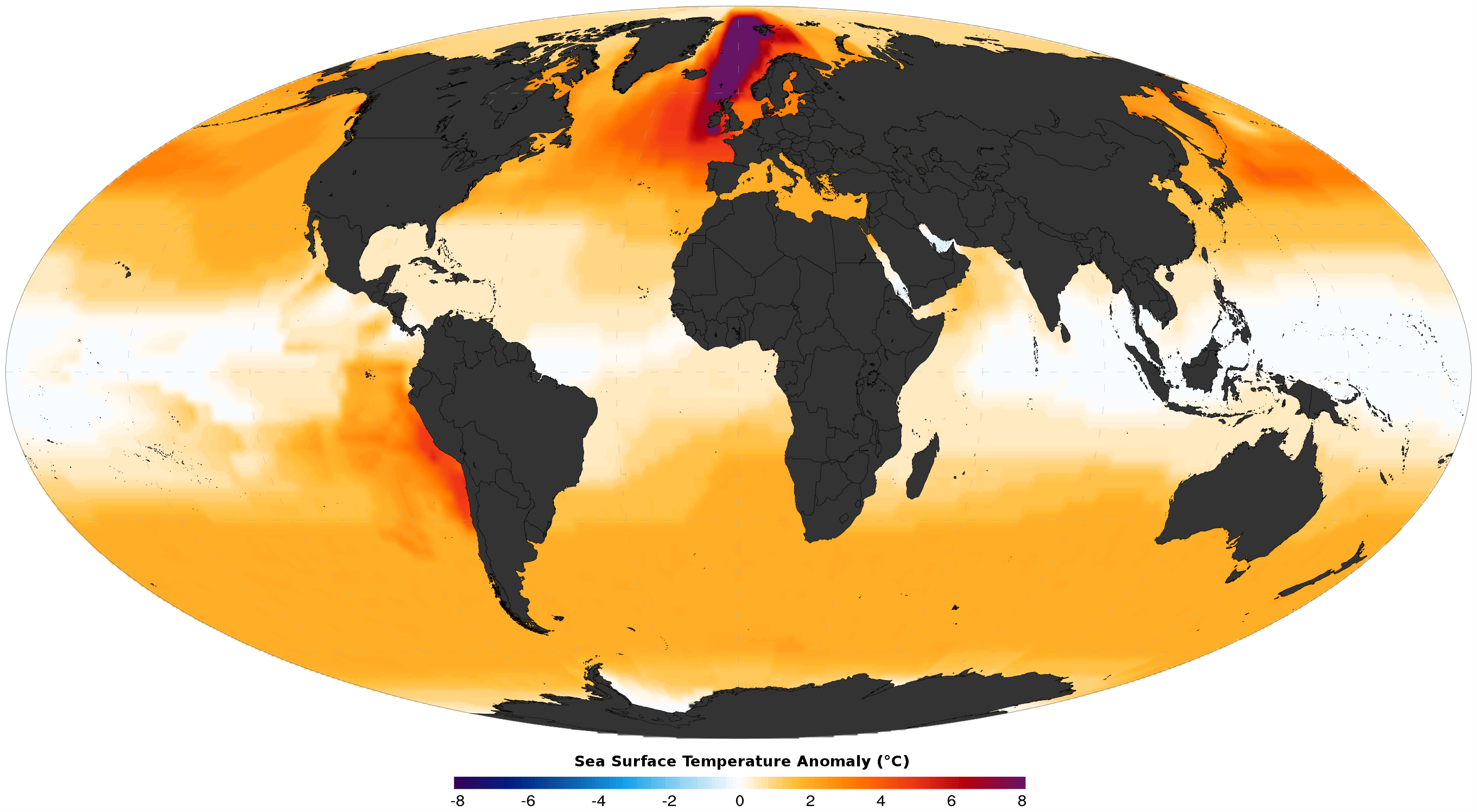
Mid-Pliocene reconstructed annual sea surface temperature anomaly

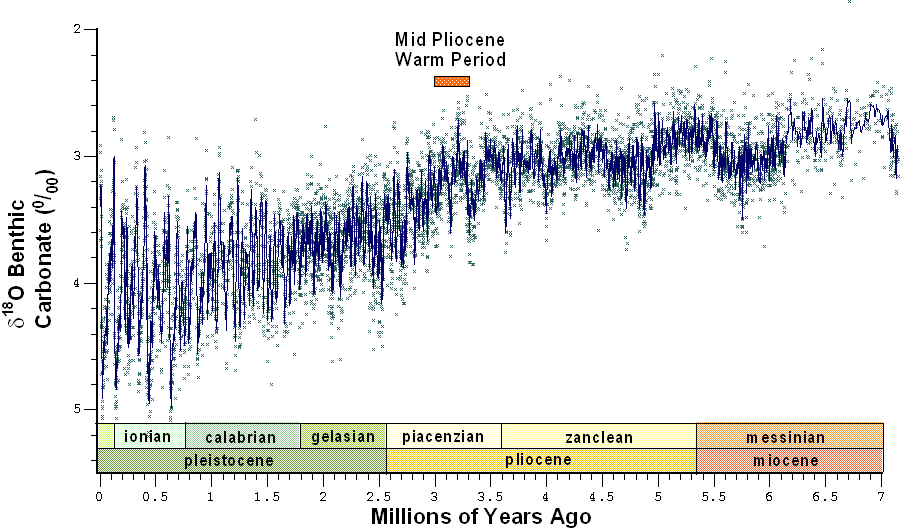
δ^{18}O Benthic foraminifera 0–7 Ma

The Mid-Piacenzian Warm Period (mPWP) (prior to 2009 known as the Middle Pliocene Warm Period), or the Pliocene Thermal Maximum, was an interval of warm climate during the Pliocene epoch that lasted from 3.3 to 3.0 million years ago (Ma).

== Climate ==
The global average temperature in the mid-Pliocene was 2–3 °C higher than today, global sea level 25 meters higher, and the Northern Hemisphere ice sheet was ephemeral before the onset of extensive glaciation over Greenland that occurred in the late Pliocene around 3 Ma. Near-surface permafrost extent was substantially lower relative to the present. Global precipitation was marginally increased by 0.09 mm/yr according to CCSM4 simulations. Annual Northern Hemisphere Hadley circulation was weakened, but annual Southern Hemisphere Hadley circulation was enhanced. As during the Quaternary glaciation, glacial-interglacial cycles existed during the mPWP and it was not a uniform and stable climatic interval.

Polar amplification during the mPWP was considerable. The mean annual temperature (MAT) of eastern interior Alaska was about 7-9 °C higher than its present day MAT of -6.4 °C. Palynological evidence from the Yermak Plateau in the Arctic Ocean shows that the thermophilic and moist boreal Tsuga-Thuja-Cupressaceae-Betula-Ilex community became dominant in the Arctic during the mPWP. At the lagerstatte of Camp del Ninots in northeastern Spain, a MAT of 14.3 ± 2.6 °C and a mean annual precipitation (MAP) of 846.8 ± 165.4 mm prevailed. The East Asian Winter Monsoon (EAWM) strengthened during the mPWP. The influence of the East Asian Summer Monsoon (EASM) did not extend as far into the interior of East Asia as it does today, causing a much drier climate to occur in the Chinese Loess Plateau relative to the present day. In the Nihewan Basin, a stable and warm climate predominated from 3.58 Ma to 3.31 Ma. From 3.31 Ma to 3.10 Ma, the warmth continued but with greater instability, with three major cool events occurring during this interval. After 3.10 Ma, the region's climate cooled significantly. In the Qaidam Basin, annual precipitation was about ten times higher than in the present, and it varied in 20-kyr precessional cycles and was likely related to the fluctuation of the EASM in response to Antarctic ice sheet dynamics and insolation forcing. The Kuroshio Current Extension (KCE) shifted northwards. The South Asian Summer Monsoon (SASM) became strengthened on both a zonal and meridional level. In southern Africa, summer and winter precipitation zones shifted poleward by ~1°, while precipitation was reduced by about 0.5 mm/day. The coast of Ecuador became drier. Subtropical South Africa became dominated by fynbos and Afrotemperate forest vegetation.

Carbon dioxide concentration during the Middle Pliocene has been estimated at around 400 ppmv from ^{13}C/^{12}C ratio in organic marine matter and stomatal density of fossilised leaves, although lower estimates of between 330 and 394 ppm over the course of the whole mPWP and 391 ppm in the KM5c interglacial, during the warmest phase of the mPWP, have been given.

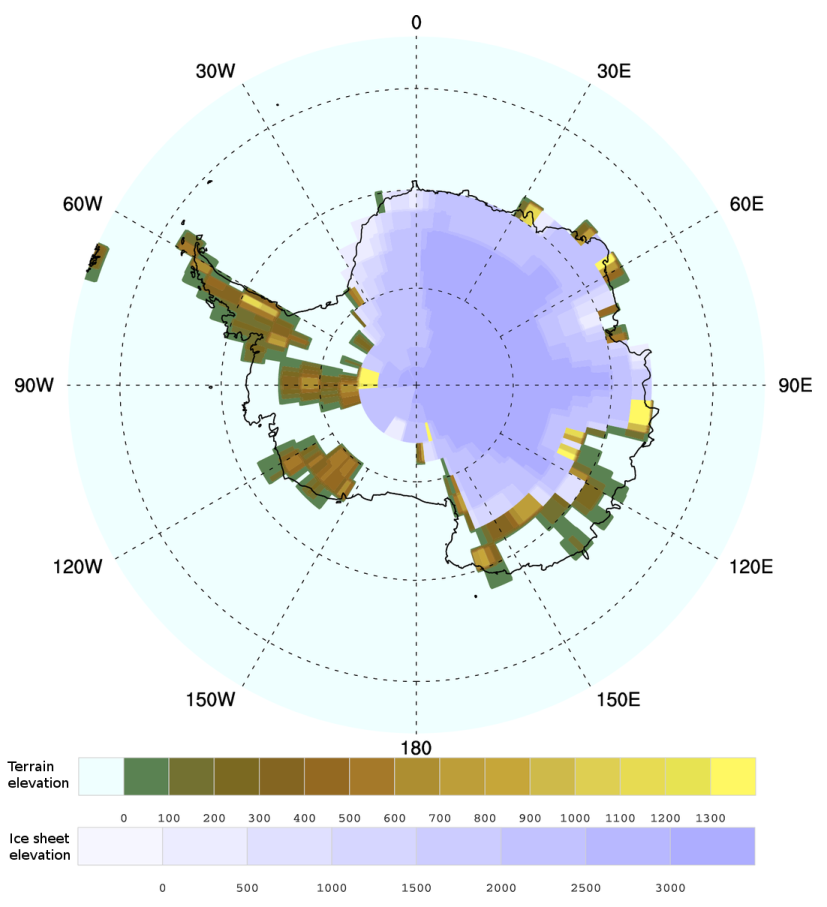
Mid-Pliocene Antarctic reconstructed terrain and ice sheet elevation

== Comparison with present global warming ==
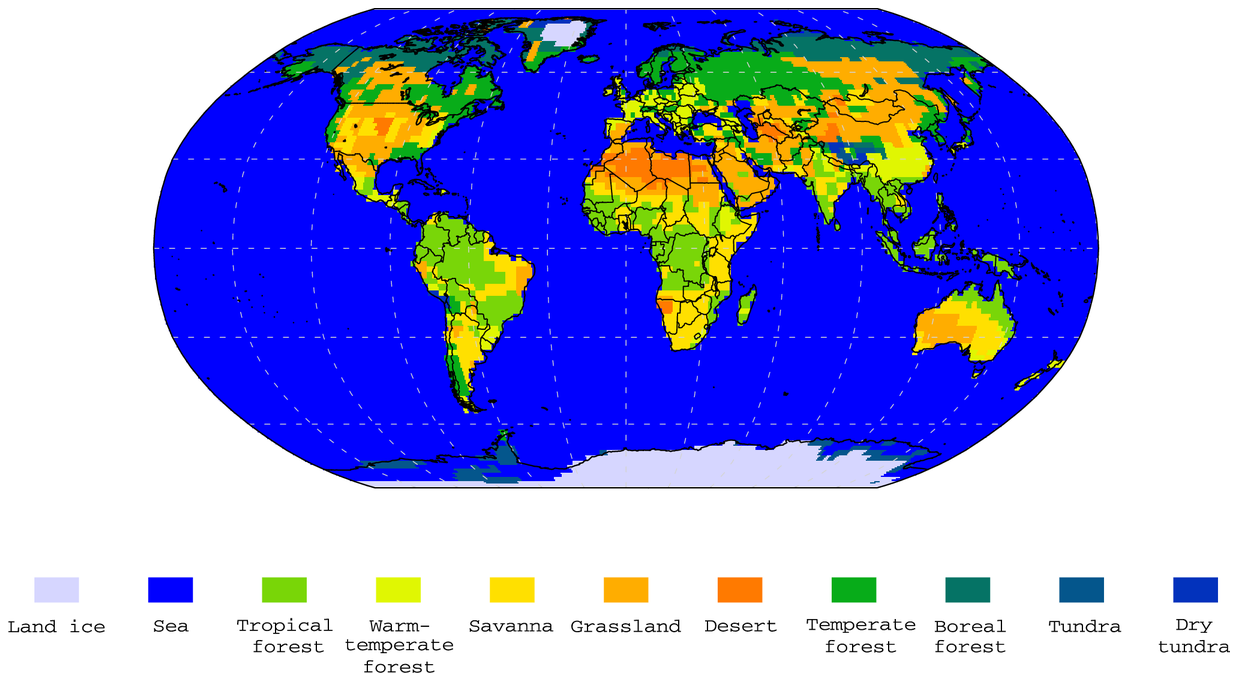
Pliocene biomes.

The mPWP is considered a potential analogue of future climate. The intensity of the sunlight reaching the Earth, the global geography, and carbon dioxide concentrations were similar to present. Furthermore, many mid-Pliocene species are extant, helping calibrate paleotemperature proxies. Model simulations of mid-Pliocene climate produce warmer conditions at middle and high latitudes, as much as 10–20 °C warmer than today above 70°N. They also indicate little temperature variation in the tropics. Model-based biomes are generally consistent with Pliocene palaeobotanical data indicating a northward shift of the tundra and taiga and an expansion of savanna and warm-temperate forest in Africa and Australia. The increased intensity of tropical cyclones during the mPWP has been cited as evidence that intensification of such storms will occur as anthropogenic global warming continues.

== See also ==
- Pliocene
- El Niño
- Five Million Years of Climate Change
