= Lysocline =

Depth in the ocean below which the rate of dissolution of calcite increases dramatically

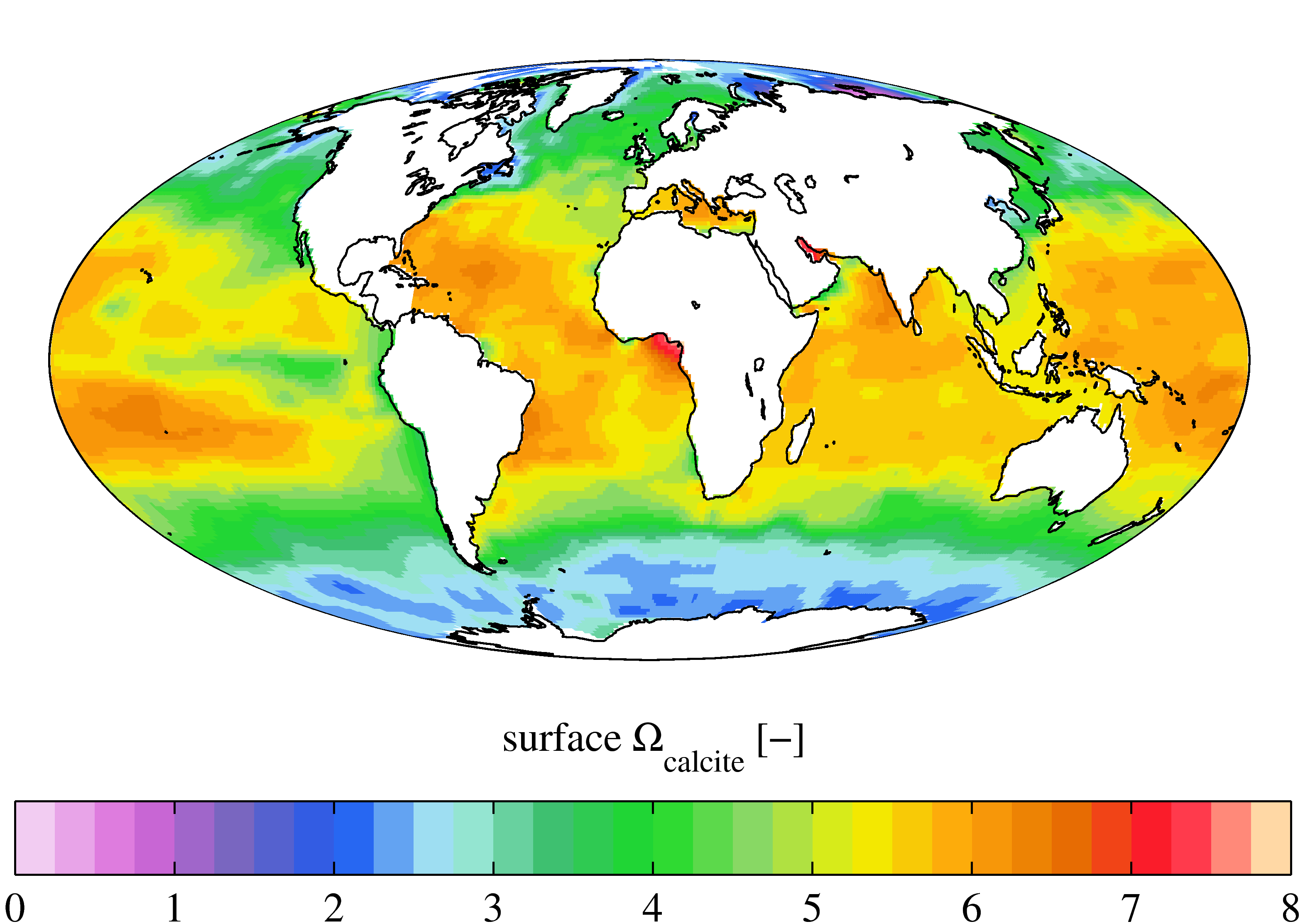
Present-day annual mean surface omega ($\Omega$) calcite, the normalised saturation state of calcite. Areas with a value lower than 1 indicate a likelihood of dissolution (undersaturation), while a value over 1 denotes no trend to dissolution (oversaturation).

The lysocline is the depth in the ocean below which the rate of dissolution of calcite increases drastically because of a pressure effect. The lysocline marks the depth above which calcite remains mostly undissolved and below which lies the saturation transition zone in which calcite saturation levels drop, enabling dissolution. The lower boundary of the transition zone is the carbonate compensation depth (CCD) below which calcite is completely dissolved in the water. The lysocline depth is dependent upon the CCD and usually lies around 5 km below the ocean's surface.

Calcium Carbonate (CaCO_{3}) content in sediment varies with ocean depth, spanning levels of separation known as the transition zone. In the mid-depth areas of the ocean, sediments are rich in calcium carbonate, with CaCO_{3} content reaching 85–95%. This area is then spanned by the transition zone for hundreds of meters, ending in the abyssal depths at a concentration of 0%. The lysocline is the upper boundary of the transition zone, where CaCO_{3} content begins to drop noticeably from the mid-depth 85–95% sediment. The CaCO_{3} content drops to 0% concentration at the lower boundary, known as the calcite compensation depth.

Shallow marine waters are generally supersaturated in calcite, CaCO_{3}, because as marine organisms (which often have shells made of calcite or its polymorph, aragonite) die, they tend to fall downwards without dissolving. As depth and pressure increase within the water column, calcite solubility increases, causing supersaturated water above the saturation depth, allowing for preservation and burial of CaCO_{3} on the seafloor. However, this creates undersaturated seawater below the saturation depth, preventing CaCO_{3} burial on the seafloor as the shells start to dissolve.

The calcium carbonate dissolution/precipitation equilibrium is governed by the law of mass action and the Le Chatelier's principle as follows:

$$\text{CaCO}_{3} \rightleftharpoons \left[\text{Ca}^{2+}\right] \left[\text{CO}_3^{2-}\right]$$

The CaCO_{3} solubility product (${K'_\mathrm{sp}}$) corresponds to the ion-activity product (IAP, or Q) at chemical equilibrium:

${K'_\mathrm{sp}} = \left[\text{Ca}^{2+}\right] \left[\text{CO}_3^{2-}\right] = IAP = Q$ at chemical equilibrium

The CaCO_{3} saturation state of seawater can be expressed in terms of $\Omega$ or with the help of saturation index ($SI$).

$$\Omega = \frac{ \left[\text{Ca}^{2+}\right] \left[\text{CO}_3^{2-}\right] } {K'_\mathrm{sp}} = \frac{IAP} {K'_\mathrm{sp}} = \frac{Q} {K'_\mathrm{sp}}$$

The saturation index ($SI$) is defined as the decimal logarithm of $\Omega$ spanning several orders of magnitude:

$$SI = \log \Omega = \log \frac{IAP} {K'_\mathrm{sp}} = \log \frac{Q} {K'_\mathrm{sp}}$$

The calcite saturation horizon is where Ω = 1, or SI = 0. Above this depth, seawater can be supersaturated with respect to CaCO_{3} (Ω > 1, or SI > 0). As seawater becomes undersaturated below this depth (Ω < 1, or SI < 0), calcium carbonate dissolution proceeds slowly. The lysocline is the depth at which this dissolution becomes notable again, also known as the inflexion point in the relationship between sedimentary CaCO_{3} and water depth.

== Calcite compensation depth ==
The calcite compensation depth (CCD) is the depth at which the rate of calcite input to the sediments is balanced by the dissolution flux, typically at a CaCO_{3} content of 2–10%. Hence, the lysocline and CCD are not equivalent. The lysocline and compensation depth occur at greater depths in the Atlantic (5000–6000 m) than in the Pacific (4000–5000 m), and at greater depths in equatorial regions than in polar regions.

The depth of the CCD varies with seawater chemical composition and temperature. Specifically, it is the deep waters that are undersaturated with calcium carbonate primarily because its solubility increases strongly with increasing pressure and salinity and decreasing temperature. As the atmospheric concentration of carbon dioxide continues to increase, the CCD can be expected to decrease in depth, as the ocean's acidity rises.

== See also ==
- Biological pump
- Carbonate compensation depth
- Ocean acidification
