= Paleocene–Eocene thermal maximum =

Global warming about 55 million years ago

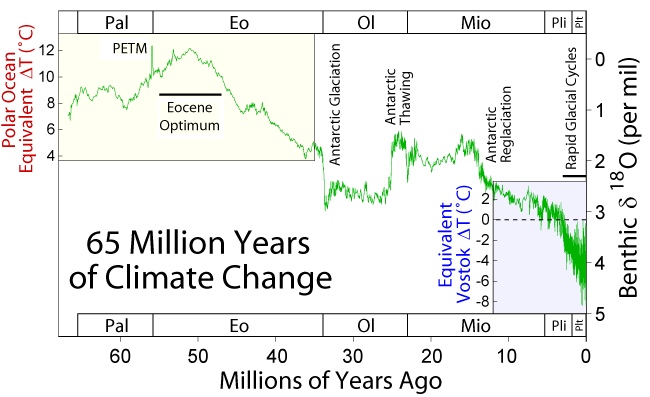
Climate change during the last 65 million years as expressed by the oxygen isotope composition of benthic foraminifera. The Paleocene-Eocene thermal maximum (PETM) is characterized by a brief but prominent excursion, attributed to rapid warming. Note that the excursion is understated in this graph due to the smoothing of data.

The Paleocene–Eocene thermal maximum (PETM), alternatively Eocene thermal maximum 1 (ETM1) and formerly known as the Initial Eocene or Late Paleocene thermal maximum, was a geologically brief time interval characterized by a 5–8 °C (9–14 °F) global average temperature rise and massive input of carbon into the ocean and atmosphere. The event began, now formally codified, at the precise time boundary between the Paleocene and Eocene geological epochs. The PETM lasted about 200,000 years, and occurred about 56 million years ago.

The PETM arguably represents the best past analogue by which to understand how global warming and the carbon cycle operate in a greenhouse world. The time interval is marked by a prominent negative excursion in carbon stable isotope (δ^{13}C) records from around the globe; more specifically, a large decrease in the ^{13}C/^{12}C ratio of marine and terrestrial carbonates and organic carbon has been found and correlated across hundreds of locations. The magnitude and timing of the PETM (δ^{13}C) excursion, which attest to the massive past carbon release to the ocean and atmosphere, and the source of this carbon remain topics of considerable current geoscience research.

What has become clear over the last few decades is that stratigraphic sections across the PETM reveal numerous changes beyond warming and carbon emission. Consistent with an Epoch boundary, fossil records of many organisms show major turnovers. In the marine realm, a mass extinction of benthic foraminifera, a global expansion of subtropical dinoflagellates, and an appearance of excursion taxa, including within planktic foraminifera and calcareous nannofossils, all occurred during the beginning stages of the PETM. On land, many modern mammal orders (including primates) suddenly appear in Europe and in North America.

== Setting ==
The configuration of oceans and continents was somewhat different during the early Paleogene relative to the present day. The Panama Isthmus did not yet connect North America and South America, and this allowed direct low-latitude circulation between the Pacific and Atlantic Oceans. The Drake Passage, which now separates South America and Antarctica, was closed, and this perhaps prevented thermal isolation of Antarctica. The Arctic was also more restricted. Although various proxies for past atmospheric carbon dioxide concentrations across the Cenozoic do not agree in absolute terms, all suggest that levels in the early Paleogene before and after the PETM were much higher than at present-day. In any case, significant terrestrial ice sheets and sea-ice did not exist during the late Paleocene through early Eocene.

Earth surface temperatures gradually increased by about 6 °C (11 °F) from the late Paleocene through the early Eocene. Superimposed on this long-term, gradual warming were at least three (and probably more) "hyperthermals". These can be defined as geologically brief (<200,000 year) events characterized by rapid global warming, major changes in the environment, and massive carbon addition. Though not the first within the Cenozoic, the PETM was the most extreme hyperthermal, and stands out as a major change in the lithologic, biotic and geochemical composition of sediment in hundreds of records across Earth. Other hyperthermals clearly occurred around 53.7 million years ago (now called ETM-2 and also referred to as H-1, or the Elmo event) and around 53.6 million years ago (H-2), 53.3 (I-1), 53.2 (I-2) and 52.8 million years ago (informally called K, X or ETM-3). The number, nomenclature, absolute ages, and relative global impact of the Eocene hyperthermals remain a source of current research. Whether they only occurred during the long-term warming, and whether they are causally related to apparently similar events in older intervals of the geological record (e.g. the Toarcian turnover of the Jurassic) are open issues.

== Global warming ==
A stacked record of temperatures and ice volume in the deep ocean through the Mesozoic and Cenozoic periods. LPTM— Paleocene-Eocene thermal maximum OAEs— oceanic anoxic events MME— mid-Maastrichtian event

A study in 2020 estimated the global mean surface temperature (GMST) with 66% confidence during the latest Paleocene (c. 57 Mya) as 22.3–28.3 °C (72.1–82.9 °F), PETM (56 Mya) as 27.2–34.5 °C (81.0–94.1 °F) and Early Eocene Climatic Optimum (EECO) (53.3 to 49.1 Mya) as 23.2–29.7 °C (73.8–85.5 °F). Estimates of the amount of average global temperature rise at the start of the PETM range from approximately 3 to 6 °C to between 5 and 8 °C. This warming was superimposed on "long-term" early Paleogene warming, and is based on several lines of evidence. There is a prominent (>1‰) negative excursion in the δ^{18}O of foraminifera shells, both those made in surface and deep ocean water. Because there was little or no polar ice in the early Paleogene, the shift in δ^{18}O very probably signifies a rise in ocean temperature. The temperature rise is also supported by the spread of warmth-loving taxa to higher latitudes, changes in plant leaf shape and size, the Mg/Ca ratios of foraminifera, and the ratios of certain organic compounds, such as TEX^{H}_{86}. Additionally, modelling suggests the climate became more equable, with a 5 °C decrease in mean annual temperature range over most continental interiors.

Proxy data from Esplugafreda in northeastern Spain shows a rapid 8 °C (14 °F) temperature rise, in accordance with existing regional records of marine and terrestrial environments. In the Fushun Basin, temperatures rose from 15.6 to 19.7 °C (60.1 to 67.5 °F). Southern California had a mean annual temperature of about 17 °C ± 4.4 °C. In Antarctica, at least part of the year saw minimum temperatures of 15 °C.

TEX^{H}_{86} values indicate that the average sea surface temperature (SST) reached over 36 °C (97 °F) in the tropics during the PETM, enough to cause heat stress even in organisms resistant to extreme thermal stress, such as dinoflagellates, of which a significant number of species went extinct. Oxygen isotope ratios from Tanzania suggest that tropical SSTs may have been even higher, exceeding 40 °C (104 °F). Ocean Drilling Program Site 1209 from the tropical western Pacific shows an increase in SST from 34 °C (93 °F) before the PETM to ~40 °C. In the eastern Tethys, SSTs rose by 3 to 5 °C (5 to 9 °F). Low latitude Indian Ocean Mg/Ca records show seawater at all depths warmed by about 4–5 °C (7–9 °F). In the Pacific Ocean, tropical SSTs increased by about 4-5 °C. TEX^{L}_{86} values from deposits in New Zealand, then located between 50°S and 60°S in the southwestern Pacific, indicate SSTs of 26 °C (79 °F) to 28 °C (82 °F), an increase of over 10 °C (18 °F) from an average of 13 °C (55 °F) to 16 °C (61 °F) at the boundary between the Selandian and Thanetian. The extreme warmth of the southwestern Pacific extended into the Australo-Antarctic Gulf. Sediment core samples from the East Tasman Plateau, then located at a palaeolatitude of ~65 °S, show an increase in SSTs from about 26 to 33 °C (79 to 91 °F) during the PETM. In the North Sea, SSTs jumped by 10 °C (18 °F), reaching highs of ~33 °C, while in the West Siberian Sea, SSTs climbed to ~27 °C.

Certainly, the central Arctic Ocean was ice-free before, during, and after the PETM. This can be ascertained from the composition of sediment cores recovered during the Arctic Coring Expedition (ACEX) at 87°N on Lomonosov Ridge. Moreover, temperatures increased during the PETM, as indicated by the brief presence of subtropical dinoflagellates (Apectodinium spp.}, and a marked increase in TEX_{86}. The latter record is unusual, though, because it suggests a 6 °C (11 °F) rise from ~17 °C (63 °F) before the PETM to ~23 °C (73 °F) during the PETM. Assuming the TEX_{86} record reflects summer temperatures, it still implies much warmer temperatures on the North Pole compared to the present day, but no significant latitudinal amplification relative to surrounding time.

The above considerations are important because, in many global warming simulations, high latitude temperatures increase much more at the poles through an ice–albedo feedback. It may be the case, however, that during the PETM, this feedback was largely absent because of limited polar ice, so temperatures on the Equator and at the poles increased similarly. Notable is the absence of documented greater warming in polar regions compared to other regions. This implies a non-existing ice-albedo feedback, suggesting no sea or land ice was present in the late Paleocene.

Precise limits on the global temperature rise during the PETM and whether this varied significantly with latitude remain open issues. Oxygen isotope and Mg/Ca of carbonate shells precipitated in surface waters of the ocean are commonly used measurements for reconstructing past temperature; however, both paleotemperature proxies can be compromised at low latitude locations, because re-crystallization of carbonate on the seafloor renders lower values than when formed. On the other hand, these and other temperature proxies (e.g., TEX_{86}) are impacted at high latitudes because of seasonality; that is, the "temperature recorder" is biased toward summer, and therefore higher values, when the production of carbonate and organic carbon occurred.

== Carbon cycle disturbance ==
Clear evidence for massive addition of ^{13}C-depleted carbon at the onset of the PETM comes from two observations. First, a prominent negative excursion in the carbon isotope composition (δ^{13}C) of carbon-bearing phases characterizes the PETM in numerous (>130) widespread locations from a range of environments. Second, carbonate dissolution marks the PETM in sections from the deep sea.

The total mass of carbon injected to the ocean and atmosphere during the PETM remains the source of debate. In theory, it can be estimated from the magnitude of the negative carbon isotope excursion (CIE), the amount of carbonate dissolution on the seafloor, or ideally both. However, the shift in the δ^{13}C across the PETM depends on the location and the carbon-bearing phase analyzed. In some records of bulk carbonate, it is about 2‰ (per mil); in some records of terrestrial carbonate or organic matter it exceeds 6‰. Carbonate dissolution also varies throughout different ocean basins. It was extreme in parts of the north and central Atlantic Ocean, but far less pronounced in the Pacific Ocean. With available information, estimates of the carbon addition range from about 2,000 to 7,000 gigatons.

== Timing of carbon addition and warming ==
The timing of the PETM δ^{13}C excursion is of considerable interest. This is because the total duration of the CIE, from the rapid drop in δ^{13}C through the near recovery to initial conditions, relates to key parameters of our global carbon cycle, and because the onset provides insight to the source of ^{13}C-depleted carbon dioxide.

The total duration of the CIE can be estimated in several ways. The iconic sediment interval for examining and dating the PETM is a core recovered in 1987 by the Ocean Drilling Program at Hole 690B at Maud Rise in the southern Atlantic Ocean. At this location, the PETM CIE, from start to end, spans about 2 m (6.6 ft). Long-term age constraints, through biostratigraphy and magnetostratigraphy, suggest an average Paleogene sedimentation rate of about 1.23 cm (0.48 in) per 1,000 years. Assuming a constant sedimentation rate, the entire event, from onset though termination, was therefore estimated at 200,000 years. Subsequently, it was noted that the CIE spanned 10 or 11 subtle cycles in various sediment properties, such as Fe content. Assuming these cycles represent precession, a similar but slightly longer age was calculated by Rohl et al. 2000. If a massive amount of ^{13}C-depleted carbon dioxide is rapidly injected into the modern ocean or atmosphere and projected into the future, a ~200,000 year CIE results because of slow flushing through quasi steady-state inputs (weathering and volcanism) and outputs (carbonate and organic) of carbon. A different study, based on a revised orbital chronology and data from sediment cores in the southern Atlantic calculated a slightly shorter duration of around 170,000 years.

An around 200,000 year duration for the CIE is estimated from models of global carbon cycling.

Age constraints at several deep-sea sites have been independently examined using ^{3}He contents, assuming the flux of this cosmogenic nuclide is roughly constant over short time periods. This approach also suggests a rapid onset for the PETM CIE (<20,000 years). However, the ^{3}He records support a faster recovery to near initial conditions (<100,000 years) than predicted by flushing via weathering inputs and carbonate and organic outputs.

There is other evidence to suggest that warming predated the δ^{13}C excursion by some 3,000 years.

Some authors have suggested that the magnitude of the CIE may be underestimated due to local processes in many sites causing a large proportion of allochthonous sediments to accumulate in their sedimentary rocks, contaminating and offsetting isotopic values derived from them. Organic matter degradation by microbes has also been implicated as a source of skewing of carbon isotopic ratios in bulk organic matter.

== Effects ==
=== Precipitation ===
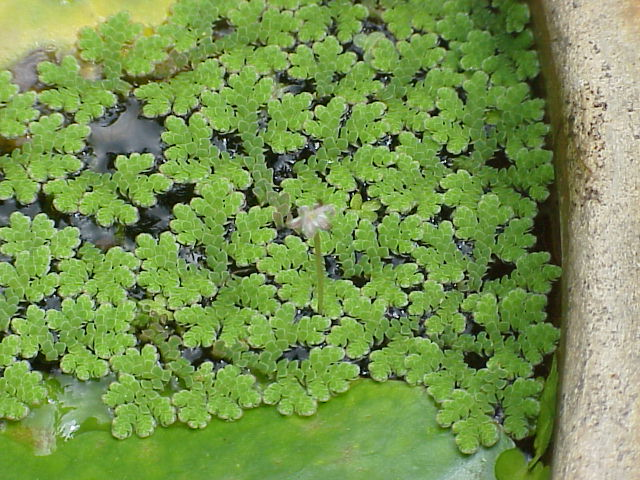
Azolla floating ferns, fossils of this genus indicate subtropical weather at the North Pole

The climate became much wetter, with the increase in evaporation rates peaking in the tropics. Deuterium isotopes reveal a considerable increase in the amount of moisture transported to the Arctic. Warm weather would have predominated as far north as the Polar basin. Finds of fossils of Azolla floating ferns in polar regions indicate subtropic temperatures at the poles. East Asia became wetter during the PETM. Central China during the PETM hosted dense subtropical forests as a result of the significant increase in rates of precipitation in the region, with average temperatures between 21 and 24 °C (70 and 75 °F) and mean annual precipitation ranging from 1,396 to 1,997 mm (4.580 to 6.552 ft). In the Jiangshan Basin, hot and humid conditions prevailed, contributing to enhanced sedimentation. Similarly, Central Asia became wetter as proto-monsoonal rainfall penetrated farther inland. Very high precipitation is also evidenced in the Cambay Shale Formation of India by the deposition of thick lignitic seams as a consequence of increased soil erosion and organic matter burial. In the Arctic, precipitation rates increased, causing an increase in sedimentation. Precipitation rates in the North Sea likewise soared during the PETM. In Cap d'Ailly, in present-day Normandy, a transient dry spell occurred just before the negative CIE, after which much moister conditions predominated, with the local environment transitioning from a closed marsh to an open, eutrophic swamp with frequent algal blooms. Precipitation patterns became highly unstable along the New Jersey Shelf, while the Gulf Coast in eastern Texas shows evidence of enhanced precipitation. In the Rocky Mountain Interior, precipitation locally declined, however, as the interior of North America became more seasonally arid. Along the central California coast, conditions also became drier overall, although precipitation did increase in the summer months. The drying of western North America is explained by the northward shift of low-level jets and atmospheric rivers. East African sites display evidence of aridity punctuated by seasonal episodes of potent precipitation, revealing the global climate during the PETM not to be universally humid. The proto-Mediterranean coastlines of the western Tethys became drier. Evidence from Forada in northeastern Italy suggests that arid and humid climatic intervals alternated over the course of the PETM concomitantly with precessional cycles in mid-latitudes, and that overall, net precipitation over the central-western Tethys Ocean decreased.

=== Ocean ===
The amount of freshwater in the Arctic Ocean increased, in part due to Northern Hemisphere rainfall patterns, fueled by poleward storm track migrations under global warming conditions. The flux of freshwater entering the oceans increased drastically during the PETM, and continued for a time after the PETM's termination.

==== Anoxia ====
The PETM generated the only oceanic anoxic event (OAE) of the Cenozoic. Oxygen depletion was achieved through a combination of elevated seawater temperatures, water column stratification, and oxidation of methane released from undersea clathrates. Denitrification was enhanced. In parts of the oceans, especially the North Atlantic Ocean, bioturbation was absent. This may be due to bottom-water anoxia or due to changing ocean circulation patterns changing the temperatures of the bottom water. However, many ocean basins remained bioturbated through the PETM. Iodine-to-calcium ratios suggest oxygen minimum zones in the oceans expanded vertically and possibly also laterally. Water column anoxia and euxinia was most prevalent in restricted oceanic basins, such as the Arctic and Tethys Oceans. Euxinia struck the epicontinental North Sea Basin as well, as shown by increases in sedimentary uranium, molybdenum, sulphur, and pyrite concentrations, along with the presence of sulphur-bound isorenieratane. The Gulf Coastal Plain was also affected by euxinia. The Atlantic Coastal Plain, well oxygenated during the Late Palaeocene, became highly dysoxic during the PETM. The Tasman Sea, as evidenced by pristane/phytane ratios, likewise saw a drop in oxygen content. The tropical surface oceans, in contrast, remained oxygenated over the course of the hyperthermal event.

It is possible that during the PETM's early stages, anoxia helped to slow down warming through carbon drawdown via organic matter burial. A pronounced negative lithium isotope excursion in both marine carbonates and local weathering inputs suggests that weathering and erosion rates increased during the PETM, generating an increase in organic carbon burial, which acted as a negative feedback on the PETM's severe global warming.

==== Sea level ====
Along with the global lack of ice, the sea level would have risen due to thermal expansion. Evidence for this can be found in the shifting palynomorph assemblages of the Arctic Ocean, which reflect a relative decrease in terrestrial organic material compared to marine organic matter. A significant marine transgression took place in the Indian Subcontinent. In the Tarim Sea, sea levels rose by 20-50 metres.

==== Currents ====
At the start of the PETM, the ocean circulation patterns changed radically in the course of under 5,000 years. Global-scale current directions reversed due to a shift in overturning from the Southern Hemisphere to Northern Hemisphere. This "backwards" flow persisted for 40,000 years. Such a change would transport warm water to the deep oceans, enhancing further warming. The major biotic turnover among benthic foraminifera has been cited as evidence of a significant change in deep water circulation.

==== Acidification ====
Ocean acidification occurred during the PETM, with seawater pH dropping by about 0.46 units. This caused the calcite compensation depth to shoal. The lysocline marks the depth at which carbonate starts to dissolve (above the lysocline, carbonate is oversaturated): today, this is at about 4 km (2.5 mi), comparable to the median depth of the oceans. This depth depends on (among other things) temperature and the amount of CO_{2} dissolved in the ocean. Adding CO_{2} initially raises the lysocline, resulting in the dissolution of deep water carbonates. This deep-water acidification can be observed in ocean cores, which show (where bioturbation has not destroyed the signal) an abrupt change from grey carbonate ooze to red clays (followed by a gradual grading back to grey). It is far more pronounced in North Atlantic cores than elsewhere, suggesting that acidification was more concentrated here, related to a greater rise in the level of the lysocline. Corrosive waters may have then spilled over into other regions of the world ocean from the North Atlantic. Model simulations show acidic water accumulation in the deep North Atlantic at the onset of the event.

Acidification of deep waters and the later spreading from the North Atlantic can explain spatial variations in carbonate dissolution. In parts of the southeast Atlantic, the lysocline rose by 2 km in just a few thousand years. Evidence from the tropical Pacific Ocean suggests a minimum lysocline shoaling of around 500 m at the time of this hyperthermal. Acidification may have increased the efficiency of transport of photic zone water into the ocean depths, thus partially acting as a negative feedback that retarded the rate of atmospheric carbon dioxide buildup. Also, diminished biocalcification inhibited the removal of alkalinity from the deep ocean, causing an overshoot of calcium carbonate deposition once net calcium carbonate production resumed, helping restore the ocean to its state before the PETM. As a consequence of coccolithophorid blooms enabled by enhanced runoff, carbonate was removed from seawater as the Earth recovered from the negative carbon isotope excursion, thus acting to ameliorate ocean acidification.

=== Life ===
Stoichiometric magnetite (Fe_{3}O_{4}) particles were obtained from PETM-age marine sediments. The study from 2008 found elongate prism and spearhead crystal morphologies, considered unlike any magnetite crystals previously reported, and are potentially of biogenic origin. These biogenic magnetite crystals show unique gigantism, and probably are of aquatic origin. The study suggests that development of thick suboxic zones with high iron bioavailability, the result of dramatic changes in weathering and sedimentation rates, drove diversification of magnetite-forming organisms, likely including eukaryotes. Biogenic magnetites in animals have a crucial role in geomagnetic field navigation.

==== Ocean ====
Shallow marine ecosystems suffered substantial ecosystem collapse. The PETM was accompanied by significant changes in the diversity of calcareous nannofossils and benthic and planktonic foraminifera. A mass extinction of 35–50% of benthic foraminifera (especially in deeper waters) occurred over the course of around 1,000 years, with the group suffering more during the PETM than during the dinosaur-slaying K-T extinction. At the onset of the PETM, benthic foraminiferal diversity dropped by 30% in the Pacific Ocean, while at Zumaia in what is now Spain, 55% of benthic foraminifera went extinct over the course of the PETM, though this decline was not ubiquitous to all sites; Himalayan platform carbonates show no major change in assemblages of large benthic foraminifera at the onset of the PETM; their decline came about towards the end of the event. A decrease in diversity and migration away from the oppressively hot tropics indicates planktonic foraminifera were adversely affected as well. The Lilliput effect is observed in shallow water foraminifera, possibly as a response to decreased surficial water density or diminished nutrient availability. Populations of planktonic foraminifera bearing photosymbionts increased. Extinction rates among calcareous nannoplankton increased, but so did origination rates. In the Peri-Tethyan region, Palaeocene calcareous nannoplankton declined during the recovery from the PETM negative carbon isotope excursion. In the Kerguelen Plateau, nannoplankton productivity sharply declined at the onset of the negative δ^{13}C excursion but was elevated in its aftermath. The nannoplankton genus Fasciculithus went extinct, most likely as a result of increased surface water oligotrophy; the genera Sphenolithus, Zygrhablithus, Octolithus suffered badly too.

Samples from the tropical Atlantic show that overall, dinocyst abundance diminished sharply. Contrarily, thermophilic dinoflagellates bloomed, particularly Apectodinium. This acme in Apectodinium abundance is used as a biostratigraphic marker defining the PETM. The fitness of Apectodinium homomorphum stayed constant over the PETM while that of others declined.

Radiolarians grew in size over the PETM.

Colonial corals, sensitive to rising temperatures, declined during the PETM, being replaced by larger benthic foraminifera. Aragonitic corals were greatly hampered in their ability to grow by the acidification of the ocean and eutrophication in surficial waters. Overall, coral framework-building capacity was greatly diminished.

The deep-sea extinctions are difficult to explain, because many species of benthic foraminifera in the deep-sea are cosmopolitan, and can find refugia against local extinction. General hypotheses such as a temperature-related reduction in oxygen availability, or increased corrosion due to carbonate undersaturated deep waters, are insufficient as explanations. Acidification may also have played a role in the extinction of the calcifying foraminifera, and the higher temperatures would have increased metabolic rates, thus demanding a higher food supply. Such a higher food supply might not have materialized because warming and increased ocean stratification might have led to declining productivity, along with increased remineralization of organic matter in the water column before it reached the benthic foraminifera on the sea floor. The only factor global in extent was an increase in temperature. Regional extinctions in the North Atlantic can be attributed to increased deep-sea anoxia, which could be due to a slowdown in overturning ocean currents or to the release and rapid oxidation of large amounts of methane.

In shallow waters, it's undeniable that increased CO_{2} levels result in a decrease in oceanic pH, which has a profound negative effect on corals. Experiments suggest it is also very harmful to calcifying plankton. However, the strong acids used to simulate the natural increase in acidity which would result from elevated CO_{2} concentrations may have given misleading results, and the most recent evidence is that coccolithophores (E. huxleyi at least) become more, not less, calcified and abundant in acidic waters. No change in the distribution of calcareous nannoplankton such as the coccolithophores can be attributed to acidification during the PETM. Nor was the abundance of calcareous nannoplankton controlled by changes in acidity, with local variations in nutrient availability and temperature playing much greater roles; diversity changes in calcareous nannoplankton in the Southern Ocean and at the Equator were most affected by temperature changes, whereas in much of the rest of the open ocean, changes in nutrient availability were their dominant drivers. Acidification did lead to an abundance of heavily calcified algae and weakly calcified forams. The calcareous nannofossil species Neochiastozygus junctus thrived; its success is attributable to increased surficial productivity driven by increased nutrient runoff. Eutrophication at the onset of the PETM precipitated a decline among K-strategist large foraminifera, though they rebounded during the post-PETM oligotrophy coevally with the demise of low-latitude corals.

A study published in May 2021 concluded that fish thrived in at least some tropical areas during the PETM, based on discovered fish fossils including Mene maculata at Ras Gharib, Egypt. Tetraodontiform fish suffered a mass extinction.

==== Land ====
The increase in mammalian abundance is notable, as many mammal clades appear around this time. Increased global temperatures may have promoted dwarfing – which may have encouraged speciation. Major mammalian dwarfing occurred early in the PETM, with further dwarfing taking place during the middle of the hyperthermal. The dwarfing of various mammal lineages led to further dwarfing in other mammals whose reduction in body size was not directly induced by the PETM. Small mammals such as stem group erinaceids exhibited no measurable dwarfing, however, with dwarfing instead being concentrated in larger animals such as equids, mesonychids, and oxyaenids. The dwarfing is believed to have been caused by a combination of anagenesis and immigration of smaller taxa. Many major mammalian clades—including hyaenodontids, artiodactyls, perissodactyls, and primates—appeared and spread around the globe 13,000 to 22,000 years after the initiation of the PETM, while more archaic mammals declined. Humid conditions caused migration of modern Asian mammals northward, dependent on the climatic belts. Uncertainty remains for the timing and tempo of migration. It is possible that the Indian Subcontinent acted as a diversity center from which mammalian lineages radiated into Africa and the continents of the Northern Hemisphere, though some studies contradict this and instead favour an "into India" theory of mammalian dispersal. Multiple Eurasian mammal orders invaded North America, but because niche space was not saturated, these had little effect on overall community structure. Mammals exhibited significant dietary change as well; the mesonychid Dissacus praenuntius, for example, became much more osteophagous over the hyperthermal's course.

Sauropsids such as squamates also show evidence of faunal turnover. Dispersal events among lizards during the PETM were mainly intracontinental, not intercontinental. Snakes in the genus Cheilophis experienced a notable dispersal event during the PETM. Gastornithids appear to have been unaffected by the PETM as far as changes in their size were concerned.

The diversity of insect herbivory, as measured by the amount and diversity of damage to plants caused by insects, increased during the PETM in correlation with global warming. The ant genus Gesomyrmex radiated across Eurasia during the PETM. As with mammals, soil-dwelling invertebrates are observed to have dwarfed during the PETM.

A profound change in terrestrial vegetation across the globe is associated with the PETM. Across all regions, floras from the latest Palaeocene are highly distinct from those of the PETM and the Early Eocene. The Arctic became dominated by palms and broadleaf forests. The Gulf coast of central Texas was covered in tropical rainforests and tropical seasonal forests.

Freshwater animals suffered mass mortality due to toxigenic cyanobacterial blooms enkindled by the extreme heat.

=== Geologic effects ===
Sediment deposition changed significantly at many outcrops and in many drill cores spanning this time interval. During the PETM, sediments are enriched with kaolinite from a detrital source due to denudation (initial processes such as volcanoes, earthquakes, and plate tectonics). Increased precipitation and enhanced erosion of older kaolinite-rich soils and sediments may have been responsible for this. Increased weathering from the enhanced runoff formed thick paleosoil enriched with carbonate nodules (Microcodium like), and this suggests a semi-arid climate. Unlike during lesser, more gradual hyperthermals, glauconite authigenesis was inhibited.

The sedimentological effects of the PETM lagged behind the carbon isotope shifts. In the Tremp-Graus Basin of northern Spain, fluvial systems grew and rates of deposition of alluvial sediments increased with a lag time of around 3,800 years after the PETM.

At some marine locations (mostly deep-marine), sedimentation rates must have decreased across the PETM, presumably because of carbonate dissolution on the seafloor; at other locations (mostly shallow-marine), sedimentation rates must have increased across the PETM, presumably because of enhanced delivery of riverine material during the event.

== Possible causes ==
Discriminating between different possible causes of the PETM is difficult. Temperatures were rising globally at a steady pace, and a mechanism must be invoked to produce an instantaneous spike which may have been accentuated or catalyzed by positive feedback (or activation of "tipping points"). The biggest aid in disentangling these factors comes from a consideration of the carbon isotope mass balance. We know the entire exogenic carbon cycle (i.e. the carbon contained within the oceans and atmosphere, which can change on short timescales) underwent a −0.2 % to −0.3 % perturbation in δ^{13}C, and by considering the isotopic signatures of other carbon reserves, can consider what mass of the reserve would be necessary to produce this effect. The assumption underpinning this approach is that the mass of exogenic carbon was the same in the Paleogene as it is today – something which is very difficult to confirm.

=== Eruption of large kimberlite field ===
Although the cause of the initial warming has been attributed to a massive injection of carbon (CO_{2} and/or CH_{4}) into the atmosphere, the source of the carbon has yet to be found. The emplacement of a large cluster of kimberlite pipes at ~56 Ma in the Lac de Gras region of northern Canada may have provided the carbon that triggered early warming in the form of exsolved magmatic CO_{2}. Calculations indicate that the estimated 900–1,100 Pg of carbon required for the initial approximately 3 °C of ocean water warming associated with the Paleocene-Eocene thermal maximum could have been released during the emplacement of a large kimberlite cluster. The transfer of warm surface ocean water to intermediate depths led to thermal dissociation of seafloor methane hydrates, providing the isotopically depleted carbon that produced the carbon isotopic excursion. The emplacement of two other kimberlite clusters in the Lac de Gras field coincides with two other early Cenozoic hyperthermals; this suggests that CO_{2} degassing during kimberlite emplacement is a plausible source of the CO_{2} responsible for these sudden global warming events.

=== Volcanic activity ===
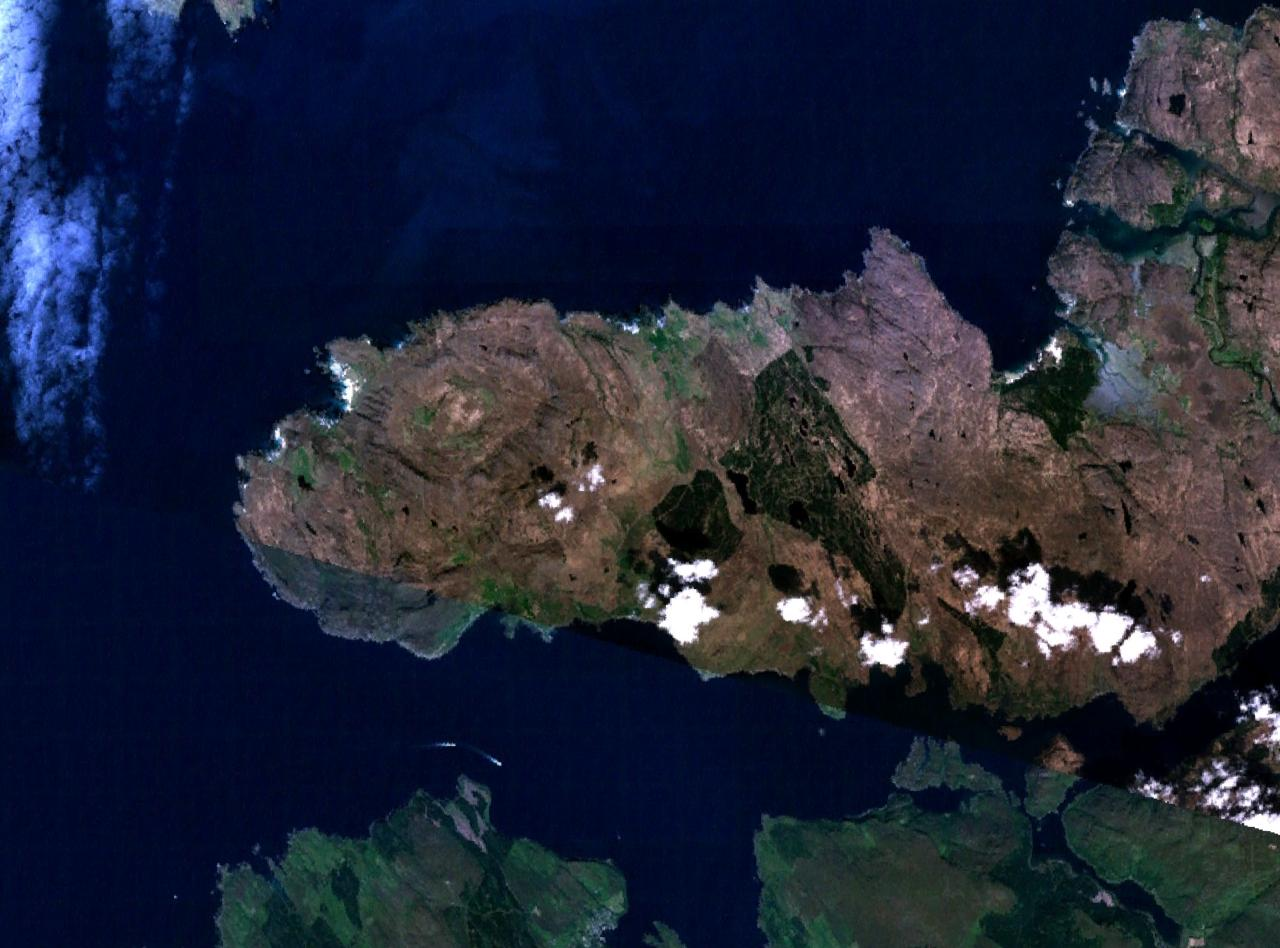
Satellite photo of Ardnamurchan – with clearly visible circular shape, which is the 'plumbings of an ancient volcano'

==== North Atlantic Igneous Province ====
One of the leading candidates for the cause of the observed carbon cycle disturbances and global warming is volcanic activity associated with the North Atlantic Igneous Province (NAIP), which is believed to have released more than 10,000 gigatons of carbon during the PETM based on the relatively isotopically heavy values of the initial carbon addition. Mercury anomalies during the PETM point to massive volcanism during the event, supplemented by tellurium anomalies. On top of that, increases in ∆^{199}Hg show intense volcanism was concurrent with the beginning of the PETM. Osmium isotopic anomalies in Arctic Ocean sediments dating to the PETM have been interpreted as evidence of a volcanic cause of this hyperthermal.

Intrusions of hot magma into carbon-rich sediments may have triggered the degassing of isotopically light methane in sufficient volumes to cause global warming and the observed isotope anomaly. This hypothesis is documented by the presence of extensive intrusive sill complexes and thousands of kilometer-sized hydrothermal vent complexes in sedimentary basins on the mid-Norwegian margin and west of Shetland. This hydrothermal venting occurred at shallow depths, enhancing its ability to vent gases into the atmosphere and influence the global climate. Volcanic eruptions of a large magnitude can impact global climate, reducing the amount of solar radiation reaching the Earth's surface, lowering temperatures in the troposphere, and changing atmospheric circulation patterns. Large-scale volcanic activity may last only a few days, but the massive outpouring of gases and ash can influence climate patterns for years. Sulfuric gases convert to sulfate aerosols, sub-micron droplets containing about 75 percent sulfuric acid. Following eruptions, these aerosol particles can linger as long as three to four years in the stratosphere. Furthermore, phases of volcanic activity could have triggered the release of methane clathrates and other potential feedback loops. NAIP volcanism influenced the climatic changes of the time not only through the addition of greenhouse gases but also by changing the bathymetry of the North Atlantic. The connection between the North Sea and the North Atlantic through the Faroe-Shetland Basin was severely restricted, as was its connection to it by way of the English Channel.

Later phases of NAIP volcanic activity may have caused the other hyperthermal events of the Early Eocene as well, such as ETM2.

==== Other volcanic activity ====
It has also been suggested that volcanic activity around the Caribbean may have disrupted the circulation of oceanic currents, amplifying the magnitude of climate change. Volcanic eruptions in the Lac de Gras kimberlite field of Canada's Slave Craton about 56 million years ago may have contributed to the Paleocene–Eocene thermal maximum.

=== Orbital forcing ===
The presence of later (smaller) warming events of a global scale, such as the Elmo horizon (aka ETM2), has led to the hypothesis that the events repeat on a regular basis, driven by maxima in the 400,000 and 100,000 year eccentricity cycles in the Earth's orbit. Cores from Howard's Tract, Maryland indicate the PETM occurred as a result of an extreme in axial precession during an orbital eccentricity maximum. The current warming period is expected to last another 50,000 years due to a minimum in the eccentricity of the Earth's orbit. Orbital increase in insolation (and thus temperature) would force the system over a threshold and unleash positive feedbacks. The orbital forcing hypothesis has been challenged by a study finding the PETM to have coincided with a minimum in the ~400 kyr eccentricity cycle, inconsistent with a proposed orbital trigger for the hyperthermal.

=== Comet impact ===
One theory holds that a ^{12}C-rich comet struck the earth and initiated the warming event. A cometary impact coincident with the P/E boundary can also help explain some enigmatic features associated with this event, such as the iridium anomaly at Zumaia, the abrupt appearance of a localized kaolinitic clay layer with abundant magnetic nanoparticles, and especially the nearly simultaneous onset of the carbon isotope excursion and the thermal maximum.

A key feature and testable prediction of a comet impact is that it should produce virtually instantaneous environmental effects in the atmosphere and surface ocean with later repercussions in the deeper ocean. Even allowing for feedback processes, this would require at least 100 gigatons of extraterrestrial carbon. Such a catastrophic impact should have left its mark on the globe. A clay layer of 5–20 m (16–66 ft) thickness on the coastal shelf of New Jersey contained unusual amounts of magnetite, but it was found to have formed 9-18 kyr too late for these magnetic particles to have been a result of a comet's impact, and the particles had a crystal structure which was a signature of magnetotactic bacteria rather than an extraterrestrial origin. However, recent analyses have shown that isolated particles of non-biogenic origin make up the majority of the magnetic particles in the clay sample.

A 2016 report in Science describes the discovery of impact ejecta from three marine P-E boundary sections from the Atlantic margin of the eastern U.S., indicating that an extraterrestrial impact occurred during the carbon isotope excursion at the P-E boundary. The silicate glass spherules found were identified as microtektites and microkrystites.

=== Burning of peat ===
The combustion of prodigious quantities of peat was once postulated, because there was probably a greater mass of carbon stored as living terrestrial biomass during the Paleocene than there is today since plants in fact grew more vigorously during the period of the PETM. This theory was refuted, because in order to produce the δ^{13}C excursion observed, over 90 percent of the Earth's biomass would have to have been combusted. However, the Paleocene is also recognized as a time of significant peat accumulation worldwide. A comprehensive search failed to find evidence for the combustion of fossil organic matter, in the form of soot or similar particulate carbon. Global records of polycyclic aromatic hydrocarbons during the PETM are highly heterogeneous and do not support a global peat burning event. Nonetheless, release of carbon from peat has been considered a possible feedback mechanism that helped to create the conditions of the PETM.

=== Enhanced respiration ===
Respiration rates of organic matter increase when temperatures rise. One feedback mechanism proposed to explain the rapid rise in carbon dioxide levels is a sudden, speedy rise in terrestrial respiration rates concordant with global temperature rise initiated by any of the other causes of warming. Mathematical modelling supports increased organic matter oxidation as a viable explanation for observed isotopic excursions in carbon during the PETM's onset.

=== Terrestrial methane release ===
Release of methane from wetlands was a contributor to the PETM warming. Evidence for this comes from a δ^{13}C decrease in hopanoids from mire sediments, likely reflecting increased wetland methanogenesis deeper within the mires.

=== Methane clathrate release ===
Methane hydrate dissolution has been invoked as a highly plausible causal mechanism for the carbon isotope excursion and warming observed at the PETM. The most obvious feedback mechanism that could amplify the initial perturbation is that of methane clathrates. Under certain temperature and pressure conditions, methane – which is being produced continually by decomposing microbes in sea bottom sediments – is stable in a complex with water, which forms ice-like cages trapping the methane in solid form. As temperature rises, the pressure required to keep this clathrate configuration stable increases, so shallow clathrates dissociate, releasing methane gas to make its way into the atmosphere. Since biogenic clathrates have a δ^{13}C signature of −60 ‰ (inorganic clathrates are the still rather large −40 ‰), relatively small masses can produce large δ^{13}C excursions. Further, methane is a potent greenhouse gas as it is released into the atmosphere, so it causes warming, and as the ocean transports this warmth to the bottom sediments, it destabilizes more clathrates.

In order for the clathrate hypothesis to be applicable to PETM, the oceans must show signs of having been warmer slightly before the carbon isotope excursion, because it would take some time for the methane to become mixed into the system and δ^{13}C-reduced carbon to be returned to the deep ocean sedimentary record. Up until the 2000s, the evidence suggested that the two peaks were in fact simultaneous, weakening the support for the methane theory. In 2002, a short gap between the initial warming and the δ^{13}C excursion was detected. In 2007, chemical markers of surface temperature (TEX_{86}) had also indicated that warming occurred around 3,000 years before the carbon isotope excursion, although this did not seem to hold true for all cores. However, research in 2005 found no evidence of this time gap in the deeper (non-surface) waters. Moreover, the small apparent change in TEX_{86} that precede the δ^{13}C anomaly can easily (and more plausibly) be ascribed to local variability (especially on the Atlantic coastal plain, e.g. Sluijs, et al., 2007) as the TEX_{86} paleo-thermometer is prone to significant biological effects.

The δ^{18}O of benthic or planktonic forams does not show any pre-warming in any of these localities, and in an ice-free world, it is generally a much more reliable indicator of past ocean temperatures. Analysis of these records reveals another interesting fact: planktonic (floating) forams record the shift to lighter isotope values earlier than benthic (bottom dwelling) forams. The lighter (lower δ^{13}C) methanogenic carbon can only be incorporated into foraminifer shells after it has been oxidised. A gradual release of the gas would allow it to be oxidised in the deep ocean, which would make benthic foraminifera show lighter values earlier. The fact that the planktonic foraminifera are the first to show the signal suggests that the methane was released so rapidly that its oxidation used up all the oxygen at depth in the water column, allowing some methane to reach the atmosphere unoxidised, where atmospheric oxygen would react with it. This observation also allows us to constrain the duration of methane release to under around 10,000 years.

However, there are several major problems with the methane hydrate dissociation hypothesis. The most parsimonious interpretation for surface-water foraminifera to show the δ^{13}C excursion before their benthic counterparts (as in the Thomas et al. paper) is that the perturbation occurred from the top down, and not the bottom up. If the anomalous δ^{13}C (in whatever form: CH_{4} or CO_{2}) entered the atmospheric carbon reservoir first, and then diffused into the surface ocean waters, which mix with the deeper ocean waters over much longer time-scales, we would expect to observe the planktonics shifting toward lighter values before the benthics.

An additional critique of the methane clathrate release hypothesis is that the warming effects of large-scale methane release would not be sustainable for more than a millennium. Thus, exponents of this line of criticism suggest that methane clathrate release could not have been the main driver of the PETM, which lasted for 50,000 to 200,000 years.

There has been some debate about whether there was a large enough amount of methane hydrate to be a major carbon source; a 2011 paper proposed that was the case. The present-day global methane hydrate reserve was once considered to be between 2,000 and 10,000 Gt C (billions of tons of carbon), but is now estimated between 1500 and 2000 Gt C. However, because the global ocean bottom temperatures were ~6 °C higher than today, which implies a much smaller volume of sediment hosting gas hydrate than today, the global amount of hydrate before the PETM has been thought to be much less than present-day estimates. One study, however, suggests that because seawater oxygen content was lower, sufficient methane clathrate deposits could have been present to make them a viable mechanism for explaining the isotopic changes. In a 2006 study, scientists regarded the source of carbon for the PETM to be a mystery. A 2011 study, using numerical simulations suggests that enhanced organic carbon sedimentation and methanogenesis could have compensated for the smaller volume of hydrate stability. A 2016 study based on reconstructions of atmospheric CO_{2} content during the PETM's carbon isotope excursions (CIE), using triple oxygen isotope analysis, suggests a massive release of seabed methane into the atmosphere as the driver of climatic changes. The authors also state that a massive release of methane hydrates through thermal dissociation of methane hydrate deposits has been the most convincing hypothesis for explaining the CIE ever since it was first identified, according to them.

In 2019, a study suggested that there was a global warming of around 2 degrees several millennia before PETM, and that this warming had eventually destabilized methane hydrates and caused the increased carbon emission during PETM, as evidenced by the large increase in barium ocean concentrations (since PETM-era hydrate deposits would have been also been rich in barium, and would have released it upon their meltdown). In 2022, a foraminiferal records study had reinforced this conclusion, suggesting that the release of CO_{2} before PETM was comparable to the current anthropogenic emissions in its rate and scope, to the point that there was enough time for a recovery to background levels of warming and ocean acidification in the centuries to millennia between the so-called pre-onset excursion (POE) and the main event (carbon isotope excursion, or CIE). A 2021 paper had further indicated that while PETM began with a significant intensification of volcanic activity and that lower-intensity volcanic activity sustained elevated carbon dioxide levels, "at least one other carbon reservoir released significant greenhouse gases in response to initial warming".

It was estimated in 2001 that it would take around 2,300 years for an increased temperature to diffuse warmth into the sea bed to a depth sufficient to cause a release of clathrates, although the exact time-frame is highly dependent on a number of poorly constrained assumptions. Ocean warming due to flooding and pressure changes due to a sea-level drop may have caused clathrates to become unstable and release methane. This can take place over as short of a period as a few thousand years. The reverse process, that of fixing methane in clathrates, occurs over a larger scale of tens of thousands of years.

=== Ocean circulation ===
The large scale patterns of ocean circulation are important when considering how heat was transported through the oceans. Our understanding of these patterns is still in a preliminary stage. Models show that there are possible mechanisms to quickly transport heat to the shallow, clathrate-containing ocean shelves, given the right bathymetric profile, but the models cannot yet match the distribution of data we observe. "Warming accompanying a south-to-north switch in deepwater formation would produce sufficient warming to destabilize seafloor gas hydrates over most of the world ocean to a water depth of at least 1900 m." This destabilization could have resulted in the release of more than 2000 gigatons of methane gas from the clathrate zone of the ocean floor. The timing of changes in ocean circulation with respect to the shift in carbon isotope ratios has been argued to support the proposition that warmer deep water caused methane hydrate release. However, a different study found no evidence of a change in deep water formation, instead suggesting that deepened subtropical subduction rather than subtropical deep water formation occurred during the PETM.

Arctic freshwater input into the North Pacific could serve as a catalyst for methane hydrate destabilization, an event suggested as a precursor to the onset of the PETM.

== Recovery ==
Climate proxies, such as ocean sediments (depositional rates) indicate a duration of ~83 ka, with ~33 ka in the early rapid phase and ~50 ka in a subsequent gradual phase.

The most likely method of recovery involves an increase in biological productivity, transporting carbon to the deep ocean. This would be assisted by higher global temperatures and CO_{2} levels, as well as an increased nutrient supply (which would result from higher continental weathering due to higher temperatures and rainfall; volcanoes may have provided further nutrients). Evidence for higher biological productivity comes in the form of bio-concentrated barium. However, this proxy may instead reflect the addition of barium dissolved in methane. Diversifications suggest that productivity increased in near-shore environments, which would have been warm and fertilized by run-off, outweighing the reduction in productivity in the deep oceans. Large deposits in the Arctic Ocean floor of the aquatic fern Azolla in the middle Eocene (the "Azolla Event") may have been a contributory factor in the early stages of the end of the PETM by sequestering carbon in buried decayed Azolla. Another pulse of NAIP volcanic activity may have also played a role in terminating the hyperthermal via a volcanic winter.

== Comparison with today's climate change ==
Since at least 1997, the PETM has been investigated in geoscience as an analogue to understand the effects of global warming and of massive carbon inputs to the ocean and atmosphere, including ocean acidification. A main difference is that during the PETM, the planet was ice-free, as the Drake Passage had not yet opened and the Central American Seaway had not yet closed. Although the PETM is now commonly held to be a "case study" for global warming and massive carbon emission, the cause, details, and overall significance of the event remain uncertain.

=== Rate of carbon addition ===
Carbon emissions during the PETM were more gradual relative to present-day anthropogenic emissions. Model simulations of peak carbon addition to the ocean–atmosphere system during the PETM give a probable range of 0.3–1.7 petagrams of carbon per year (Pg C/yr), which is much slower than the currently observed carbon emission rate. One petagram of carbon is equivalent to a gigaton of carbon (GtC); the current rate of carbon injection into the atmosphere is over 10 GtC/yr, a rate much greater than the carbon injection rate that occurred during the PETM. It has been suggested that today's methane emission regime from the ocean floor is potentially similar to that during the PETM. Because the modern rate of carbon release exceeds the PETM's, it is speculated the a PETM-like scenario is the best-case consequence of anthropogenic global warming, with a mass extinction of a magnitude similar to the Cretaceous-Palaeogene extinction event being a worst-case scenario.

=== Similarity of temperatures ===
Professor of Earth and planetary sciences James Zachos notes that IPCC projections for 2300 in the 'business-as-usual' scenario could "potentially bring global temperature to a level the planet has not seen in 50 million years" – during the early Eocene. Some have described the PETM as arguably the best ancient analog of modern climate change. Scientists have investigated effects of climate change on chemistry of the oceans by exploring oceanic changes during the PETM.

=== Tipping points ===
A study found that the PETM shows that substantial climate-shifting tipping points in the Earth system exist, which "can trigger release of additional carbon reservoirs and drive Earth's climate into a hotter state".

=== Climate sensitivity ===
Whether climate sensitivity was lower or higher during the PETM than today remains under debate. A 2022 study found that the Eurasian Epicontinental Sea acted as a major carbon sink during the PETM due to its high biological productivity and helped to slow and mitigate the warming, and that the existence of many large epicontinental seas at that time made the Earth's climate less sensitive to forcing by greenhouse gases relative to today, when much fewer epicontinental seas exist. Other research, however, suggests that climate sensitivity was higher during the PETM than today, meaning that sensitivity to greenhouse gas release increases the higher their concentration in the atmosphere.

== See also ==
- Abrupt climate change
- Azolla event
- Canfield ocean
- Clathrate gun hypothesis
- Climate sensitivity
- Eocene
- Eocene Thermal Maximum 2
- Paleocene
- Paleogene
- Runaway greenhouse effect
