= Azilestes =

Azilestes Temporal range: 70–66 Ma Late Cretaceous (early Maastrichtian)

Scientific classification
- Kingdom: Animalia
- Phylum: Chordata
- Class: Mammalia
- Family: †Zhelestidae
- Genus: †Azilestes; Gheerbrant & Teodori, 2021
- Species: †A. ragei

Binomial name
- †Azilestes ragei Gheerbrant & Teodori, 2021

Extinct genus of mammal

Azilestes ("Mas-d'Azil robber") is a genus of probable zhelestid eutherian mammal, a family consisting of small herbivores, that was discovered in the early Maastrichtian Grès de Labarre Formation of France. It is a monotypic genus, with only type species A. ragei being known. Only one specimen, the holotype described in 2021, is known. It consists of a partial dentary with teeth.

Certain aspects of Azilestes's dental anatomy are heavily convergent with later groups of herbivorous mammals, including Glires, though comparative anatomy suggests a position within the Zhelestidae. It possesses bunodont molars, enlarged postfossids and hypoconids, an interradicular crest and radicular grooves, a unique combination among Cretaceous eutherians.

== History of discovery ==
The sole specimen and holotype of Azilestes, a partial dentary with teeth, was discovered in the Grès de Labarre Formation of the northern Pyrenees, near the Mas-d’Azil of the Ariège department in Occitanie region, France. The specimen was found in the northeastern outcrops of the Grès de Labarre levels, northeast of the Mas-d’Azil, by surface prospecting in the area. The vertebrate-bearing level where it was found is a fossiliferous hard sandstone, belonging to the upper unit of the Grès de Labarre which overlies the Marnes d’En Gauly. Together with the overlying "Marnes Rouges Inférieures" formation, an eastern lateral equivalent of the Marnes d'Auzas, it comprises the last Cretaceous deposits of the Sub-Pyrenean zone.

Azilestes was described by Emmanuel Gheerbrant and Dominique Teodori in 2021, and much of its anatomy was mapped using CT scanning. It was named for Mas-d'Azil, the type locality, and the Greek λῃστής, or lestes ("robber"). The specific epithet is after Jean-Claude Rage, in tribute to his major contribution to the study of Cretaceous microvertebrates from Europe.

== Description ==
Though damaged and fragmentary, the sole specimen of Azilestes, dated to the early Maastrichtian, is one of the most complete jaw remains of a eutherian reported from the Late Cretaceous of Europe. It preserves only part of the mandibular corpus, including the posterior part of the mandibular symphysis. The symphysis extends far posteriorly, close to the level of the alveolus of the fourth premolar, and is very compact. The mandibular corpus is dorso-ventrally high, and labially inflated. It is convex below the molars, but below the premolars and the symphysis, it is concave. Its dorso-ventral depth decreases drastically at the length of the symphysis.

The posterior mental foramen is rather large and located ventro-labially below and between the two roots of the fifth premolar, as in most Cretaceous eutherians. The dentary preserves two damaged molars and four well-developed empty anterior alveoli, interpreted as corresponding to two-rooted fifth premolar, and a single-rooted fourth premolar and canine. Among Cretaceous eutherians, the molar morphology of the holotype most closely resembles the family Zhelestidae, to which it is tentatively assigned. Zhelestids were non-placental eutherians, and were specialized for a herbivorous diet.

In addition to bunodont cusps and crowns, a shortened, robust dentary with reduced premolar formula, a small hypolophid and cingular-like postcristid and hypoconulid are unique among Cretaceous eutherians. The closest eutherian to Azilestes, assuming a zhelestid identity, is Valentinella. However, the comparison of these two genera is limited due to the latter's poor preservation. Shared attributes include a possible hypocone, bunodont molar crowns with bulbous cusps, and a robust and deep mandibular corpus that is ventrally convex.

== Taxonomy ==
Phylogenetic analyses within the paper variably suggest Azilestes to be part of a eutherian polytomy or a basal member of Glires, or, when constrained within the Zhelestidae, the sister genus to Valentinella, and in one phylogeny, they are part of the Lainodontinae. While a position within the Zhelestidae is most likely, Gheerbrant and Teodori (2021) assume a basal position within the Eutheria.

Below is a phylogeny from Gheerbrant & Teodori (2021):

- - Nanolestes
  - - Peramus
    - - Vincelestes
      - - Kielantherium
        - - - Deltatheridium
            - - Mayulestes
              - Pucadelphys
          - Eutheria
            - - Eomaia
              - Prokennalestes
              - Murtoilestes
            - - Bobolestes
              - - Montanalestes
                - - Paranyctoides
                  - Zhelestidae
                    - Sheikhdheilia
                    - - Lainodon
                      - Alostera
                      - - Eozhelestes
                        - Avitotherium
                        - Parazhelestes
                        - Aspanlestes
                        - Zhelestes
                        - - Borisodon
                          - Gallolestes
                        - - Eoungulatum
                          - - Valentinella
                            - Azilestes
                - - - Bulaklestes
                    - Daulestes
                    - Uchkudukodon
                  - - - Cimolestes
                      - - Maelestes
                        - Batodon
                    - - - Kennalestes
                        - - Asioryctes
                          - Ukhaatherium
                      - - Deccanolestes
                        - - - Kulbeckia
                            - - Zhangolestes
                              - - - Zalambdalestes
                                  - Barunlestes
                                - - Alymlestes
                                  - Mistralestes
                          - - - Gypsonictops
                              - Leptictis
                            - - - Purgatorius
                                - - Protungulatum
                                  - Oxyprimus
                              - - - - Arctocyon
                                    - - Vulpavus
                                      - Miacis
                                  - - Diacodexis
                                    - - Hyopsodus
                                      - - Meniscotherium
                                        - Phenacodus
                                - - - - extant Placentalia

== Palaeoecology ==
Azilestes is one of the largest Mesozoic Mammals found in Europe thus far, comparable in size to Protungulatum. The bunodont molars, the large postfossid and hypoconid, wear patterns, and the development of an interradicular crest and radicular grooves indicate a crushing-grinding function for Azilestes's teeth, possibly suggesting a durophagous lifestyle.

Only three non-avian dinosaurs are known to have coexisted with Azilestes. These are the rhabdodontid Rhabdodon, cf. Ampelosaurus atacis, and an indeterminate nodosaurid.
