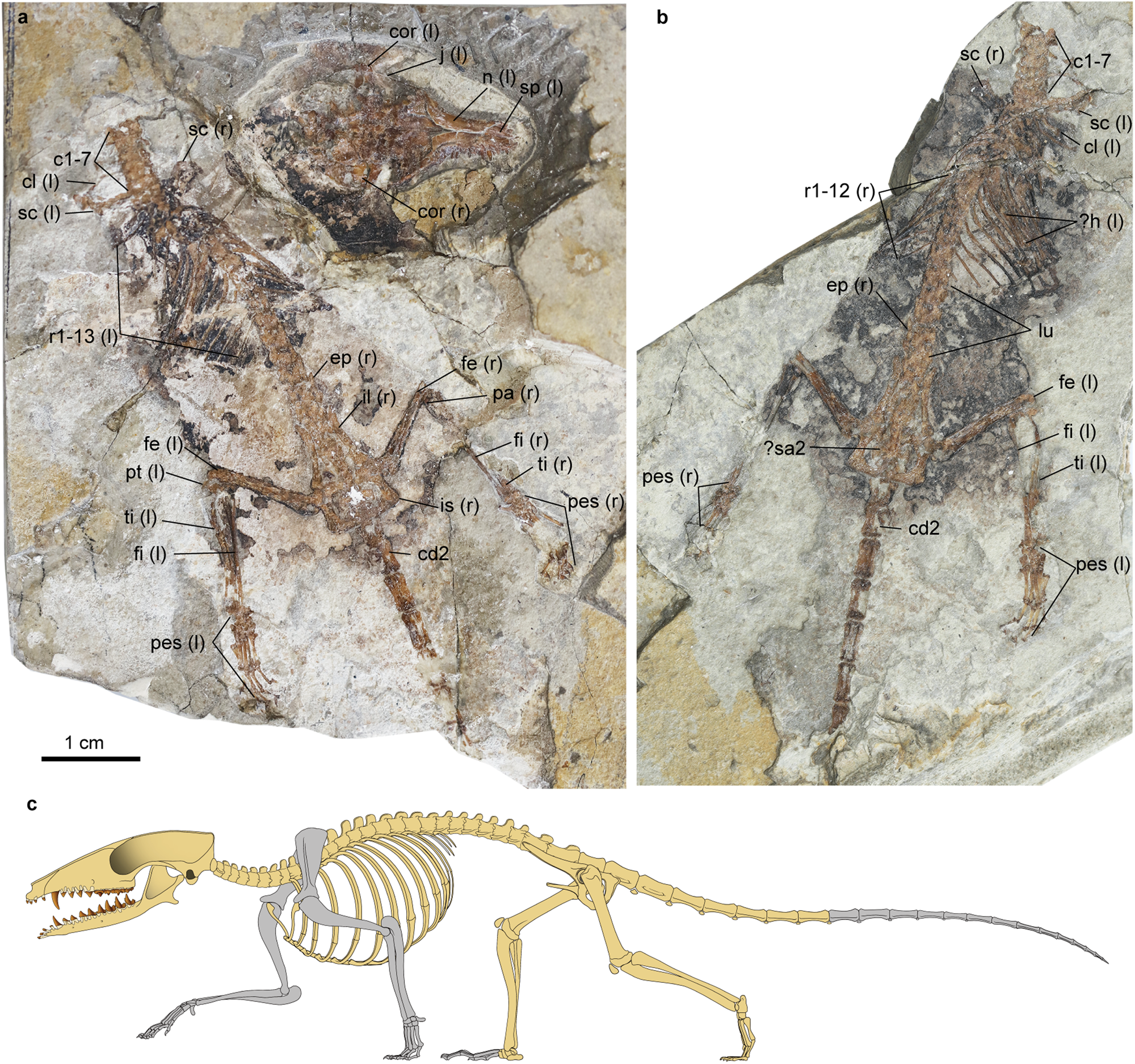

Scientific classification
- Kingdom: Animalia
- Phylum: Chordata
- Class: Mammalia
- Clade: Eutheria
- Genus: †Microtherulum; Wang & Wang, 2023

Type species
- Microtherulum oneirodes Wang & Wang, 2023

= Microtherulum =

Microtherulum Temporal range: Early Cretaceous (Aptian) 120–118 Ma

Extinct genus of eutherian mammal

Microtherulum is an extinct genus of eutherian mammal known from the Early Cretaceous Jiufotang Formation of China. It is one of the earliest and most primitive eutherians.

== Description ==
The genus is known from a mostly complete skeleton, including a well preserved skull, which is about 2 centimetres (0.79 in) long. The ear, which is among the best known in basal eutherians, is microtype, adapted for hearing high-frequency sounds. The dental formula is 5 incisors, 1 canine, 5 premolars and 3 molars in the each half of the upper jaw, and 4 incisors, 1 canine, 5 premolars and 3 molars in each half of the lower jaw, which is typical for basal eutherians.

== Phylogeny ==
Microtherulum has been placed close to the base of Eutheria.

- Metatheria
- Eutheria
  - - Sinodelphys
    - Ambolestes
  - Acristatherium
  - Microtherulum
  - Cokotherium
  - - Juramaia
    - - Eomaia
      - - Prokennalestes
        - - Murtoilestes
          - - Montanalestes
            - - Daulestes
              - - - Ukhaatherium
                  - - Asioryctes
                    - Kennalestes
                - - - Gypsonictops
                    - Cimolestes
                  - - Zalambdalestes
                    - - - Aspanlestes
                        - - Protungulatum
                          - Eoungulatum
                      - - Leptictis
                        - Placentalia
