= Zhelestidae =

Zhelestidae Temporal range: 99.6–70.6 Ma Late Cretaceous

Scientific classification
- Kingdom: Animalia
- Phylum: Chordata
- Class: Mammalia
- Clade: Eutheria
- Family: †Zhelestidae; Nessov (1985)

Genera
- ?Labes; ?Alostera; Aspanlestes; Avitotherium; ?Azilestes; Borisodon; Eoungulatum; Eozhelestes; Gallolestes; ?Khuduklestes; ?Mistralestes; ?Oxlestes; ?Paranyctoides; Parazhelestes; Ravjaa; Sheikhdzheilia; Sorlestes; Zhalmousia; Zhelestes; Lainodontinae; Labes; Lainodon; ?Valentinella

Extinct family of mammals

Zhelestidae is a lineage of extinct eutherian mammals. Occurring in the Late Cretaceous from the Turonian to the Maastrichtian, they were an extremely successful group, with representatives present in Europe, Asia, India (and subsequently in Madagascar), Africa and North America, ostensibly rendering them a cosmopolitan clade. They were specialised towards an herbivorous lifestyle and were in fact initially considered stem-ungulates, but the presence of epipubics and "archaic" dental characters render them as non-placental eutherians. They may be closely related to zalambdalestids.

== Range ==
The earliest zhelestid remains occur in the Cenomanian of Central Asia. By the Campanian, however, they are present in Europe and North America, and by the Maastrichtian in India and in Madagascar (UA 8699). In Europe, then an island continent, taxa usually accepted to be zhelestids are the most common Late Cretaceous mammal remains, aside from Hațeg Island where kogaionid multituberculates are more common instead, though there is a single possible zhelestid tooth there as well.

== Ecology ==
Zhelestids are well specialised towards a herbivorous diet, their teeth suited for a lateral chewing mechanism similar to that of modern ungulates. An exception to this might be forms like Oxlestes and Khuduklestes, which are normally interpreted as carnivorous, and perhaps a few forms like Borisodon which may have been insectivorous. Ranging from mouse sized forms to ones comparable to small ungulates in size, zhelestids occupied a massive variety of ecological guilds.

In contrast to their dietary divergence, the few available limb remains suggest that they weren't very specialised locomotion wise, in contrast to some other basal eutherians like for instance Zalambdalestes, which was long-limbed and had several adaptations for cursoriality and hopping.

There is evidence that zhelestids were in direct competition with another clade of Mesozoic herbivorous mammals, the multituberculates, being rarer in places where these were most common and vice versa. However, multituberculates eventually outlived zhelestids, surviving the K-Pg extinction event everywhere but Asia, where the niches taken by both clades in the Cretaceous would be taken by early rodents.

== Phylogeny ==
Below is a phylogeny from Gheerbrant & Teodori (2021):

- - Nanolestes
  - - Peramus
    - - Vincelestes
      - - Kielantherium
        - - - Deltatheridium
            - - Mayulestes
              - Pucadelphys
          - Eutheria
            - - Eomaia
              - Prokennalestes
              - Murtoilestes
            - - Bobolestes
              - - Montanalestes
                - - Paranyctoides
                  - Zhelestidae
                    - Sheikhdzheilia
                    - - Lainodon
                      - Alostera
                      - - Eozhelestes
                        - Avitotherium
                        - Parazhelestes
                        - Aspanlestes
                        - Zhelestes
                        - - Borisodon
                          - Gallolestes
                        - - Eoungulatum
                          - - Valentinella
                            - Azilestes
                - - - Bulaklestes
                    - Daulestes
                    - Uchkudukodon
                  - - - Cimolestes
                      - - Maelestes
                        - Batodon
                    - - - Kennalestes
                        - - Asioryctes
                          - Ukhaatherium
                      - - Deccanolestes
                        - - - Kulbeckia
                            - - Zhangolestes
                              - - - Zalambdalestes
                                  - Barunlestes
                                - - Alymlestes
                                  - Mistralestes
                          - - - Gypsonictops
                              - Leptictis
                            - - - Purgatorius
                                - - Protungulatum
                                  - Oxyprimus
                              - - - - Arctocyon
                                    - - Vulpavus
                                      - Miacis
                                  - - Diacodexis
                                    - - Hyopsodus
                                      - - Meniscotherium
                                        - Phenacodus
                                - - - - extant Placentalia
