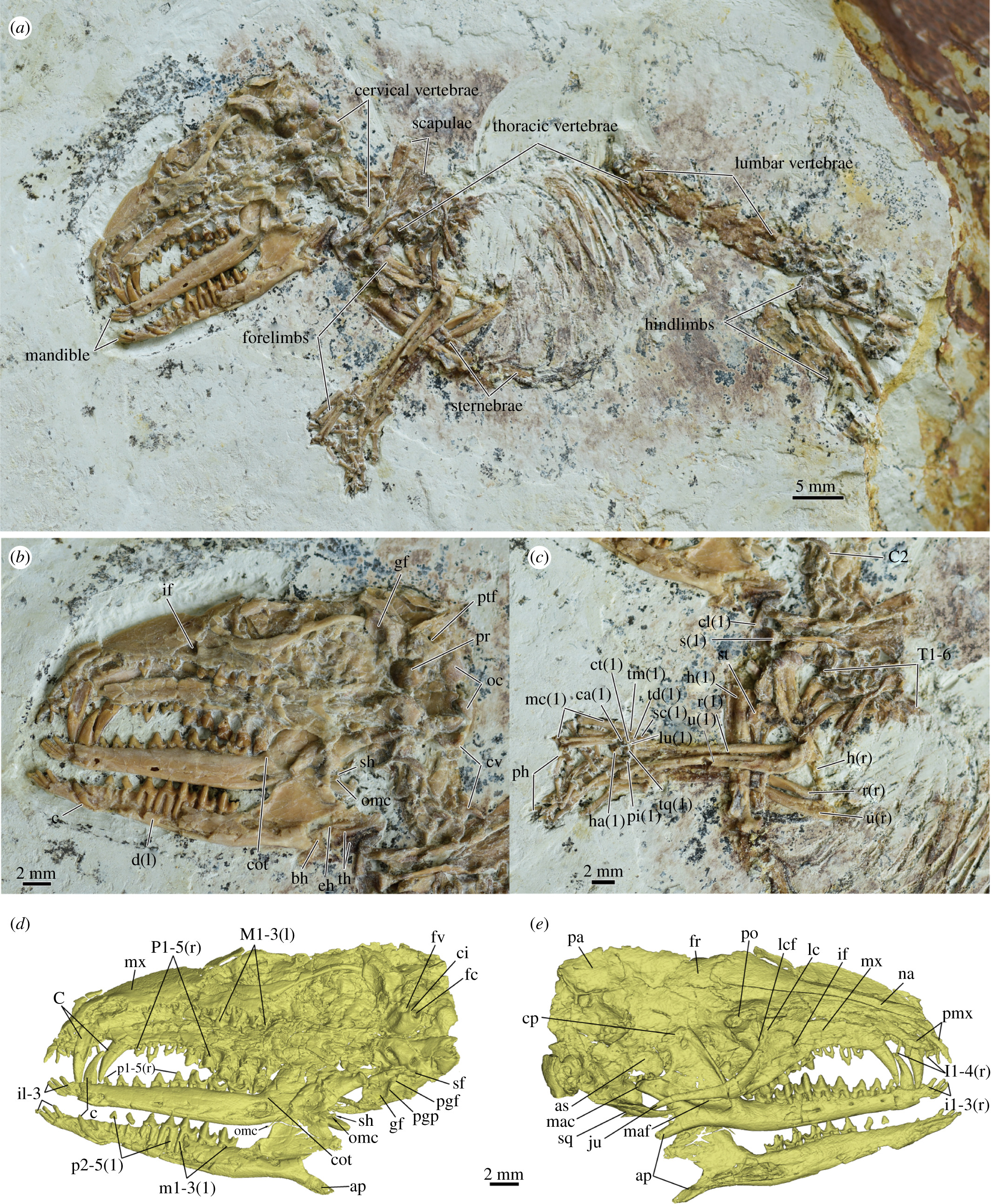
- Holotype fossil of Cokotherium (a), with closer views of the skull (b), forelimbs (c), and CT-scanned 3D models of the skull (d-e)

Scientific classification
- Kingdom: Animalia
- Phylum: Chordata
- Class: Mammalia
- Clade: Eutheria
- Genus: †Cokotherium; Wang et al., 2022

Type species
- †Cokotherium jiufotangensis Wang et al., 2022

= Cokotherium =

Cokotherium Temporal range: Early Cretaceous, 120 Ma

Extinct genus of mammals

Cokotherium is an extinct genus of eutherian mammal from the Early Cretaceous of China. It includes a single species, Cokotherium jiufotangensis, known from a single partial skeleton, missing a portion of the hindlimbs and tail. It was recovered from the Jiufotang Formation (120 Ma), the upper part of the fossiliferous Jehol biota. The generic name of Cokotherium honors the nickname of the late paleontologist Chuan-Kui Li, a specialist on the Jiufotang Formation. The specific name refers to the formation in question. Cokotherium is one of the youngest and most well-preserved Early Cretaceous eutherians, illustrating an array of transitional conditions between Early Cretaceous and Late Cretaceous members of Eutheria.

== Description ==
=== Dentition ===
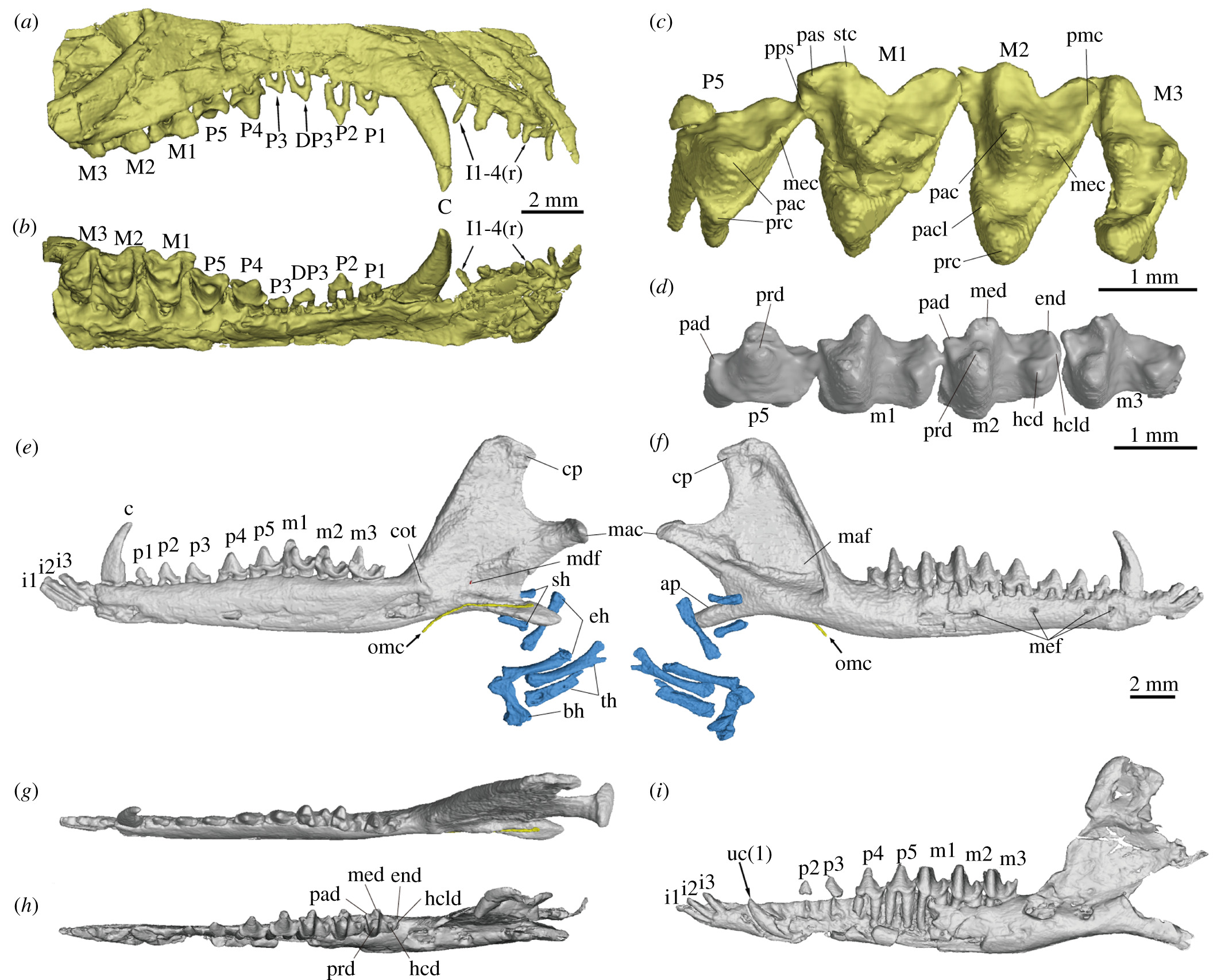
CT-scanned 3D models of the upper (a-c) and lower (d-i) jaws and teeth

The incisors, though conical and procumbent like other Early Cretaceous eutherians, are reduced in number; there are 4 in the upper jaw and 3 in the lower. Both the upper and lower canines are single-rooted, similar to metatherians (marsupial-line therians). Like most Mesozoic eutherians, Cokotherium has 5 premolars and 3 molars in both the upper and lower jaw. Similar to Late Cretaceous taxa, the last upper premolar is "molarized", with three roots and swollen cusps akin to the succeeding molars. Conversely, the protocone of the last upper premolar is much smaller than in the molars, and the last lower premolar lacks any molar-like specializations. The tribosphenic molars are simpler than in most Late Cretaceous eutherians. The upper molars have few additional protuberances or ridges beyond the three main cusps (protocone, paracone, and metacone). Likewise, the lower molars have a stout trigonid region (with three cusps: the protoconid > metaconid > paraconid) and an expansive talonid region (with two cusps: an entoconid and hypoconulid).

The single known specimen of Cokotherium was in the process of replacing its third upper premolar, since both a deciduous tooth and a permanent tooth occupy the same position in the jaw. The other premolars are fully developed, including the second and fourth upper premolars. Alternating tooth replacement, with odd-numbered tooth replacement disjointed from their even-numbered neighbors, has been reported in a few other Mesozoic mammals, including the Jurassic eutherian Juramaia. It contrasts with the condition in placentals (living eutherians), which replace their teeth in a consistent sequence from front-to-back. The left lower canine also has yet to erupt, despite the full development and usage of the molars and remaining canines. The delayed eruption of the left lower canine is likely a consequence of localized injury rather than a developmental quirk.

=== Other features ===
Cokotherium is the only eutherian with direct preservation of an ossified meckelian cartilage, similar to non-therian mammals. A few other early eutherians retain a meckelian sulcus, a groove on the ectotympanic which hinted that a meckelian cartilage was present at the base of Eutheria. The meckelian cartilage of Cokotherium is reduced to a slender strand lying against the angular process of the mandible, fully detached from the middle ear ossicles. The angular process itself is distinctly longer than in other early eutherians. Micro-CT scanning has revealed that Cokotherium has the most well-preserved osseous labyrinth (inner ear) in any Early Cretaceous eutherian, showing a combination of advanced and plesiomorphic ("primitive") features relative to later eutherians.

== Classification ==
Phylogenetic analyses by Wang et al. (2022) placed Cokotherium in a clade with Ambolestes and Sinodelphys at the base of Eutheria. In maximum parsimony analyses, Montanalestes also joins the clade, though it lies further down the eutherian stem in bayesian analyses.

Phylogeny after Yang & Yang, 2023.

- Metatheria
- Eutheria
  - - †Sinodelphys
    - †Ambolestes
  - †Acristatherium
  - †Microtherulum
  - †Cokotherium
  - - †Juramaia
    - - †Eomaia
      - - †Prokennalestes
        - - †Murtoilestes
          - - †Montanalestes
            - - †Daulestes
              - - - †Ukhaatherium
                  - - †Asioryctes
                    - †Kennalestes
                - - - †Gypsonictops
                    - †Cimolestes
                  - - †Zalambdalestes
                    - - - †Aspanlestes
                        - - †Protungulatum
                          - †Eoungulatum
                      - - †Leptictis
                        - Placentalia
