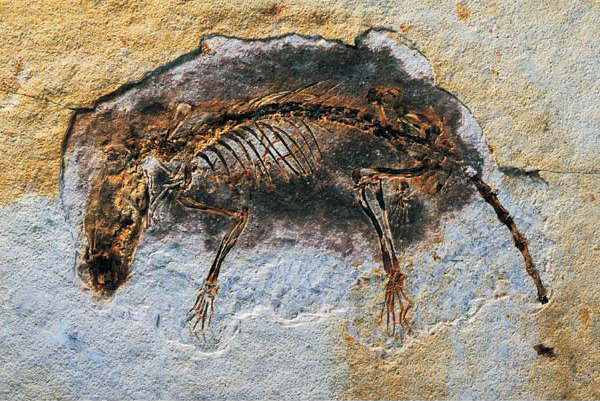
- Fossil specimen CAGS 01−IG−1

Scientific classification
- Kingdom: Animalia
- Phylum: Chordata
- Class: Mammalia
- Clade: Tribosphenida
- Genus: †Eomaia; Ji et al., 2002

Type species
- †Eomaia scansoria Ji et al., 2002

= Eomaia =

Eomaia Temporal range: Early Cretaceous, 125 Ma

Extinct genus of mammals

Eomaia ("dawn mother") is a genus of extinct fossil mammals containing the single species Eomaia scansoria, discovered in rocks that were found in the Yixian Formation, Liaoning Province, China, and dated to the Barremian Age of the Lower Cretaceous about 125 million years ago. The single fossil specimen of this species is 10 centimetres (3.9 in) in length and virtually complete. An estimate of the body weight is 20–25 grams (0.71–0.88 oz). It is exceptionally well-preserved for a 125-million-year-old specimen. Although the fossil's skull is squashed flat, its teeth, tiny foot bones, cartilages and even its fur are visible.

== Description ==
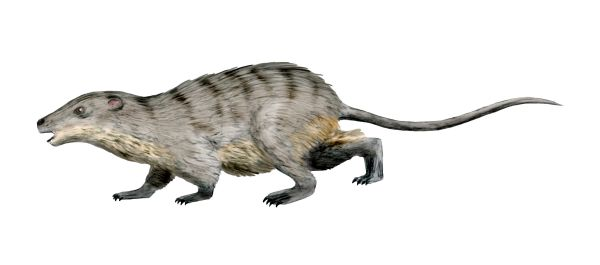
Restoration

The Eomaia fossil shows clear traces of hair. However, this is not the earliest clear evidence of hair in the mammalian lineage, as fossils of Volaticotherium, and the docodont Castorocauda, discovered in rocks dated to about 164 million years ago, also have traces of fur.

Eomaia scansoria possessed several features in common with placental mammals that distinguish them from metatherians, the group that includes modern marsupials. These include an enlarged malleolus ("little hammer") at the bottom of the tibia (the larger of the two shin bones), a joint between the first metatarsal bone and the medial cuneiform bone in the foot which is offset further back than the joint between the second metatarsal and intermediate cuneiform bones (in metatherians these joints are level with each other), as well as various features of jaws and teeth.

However, E. scansoria is not a true placental mammal as it lacks some features that are specific to placentals. These include the presence of a malleolus at the bottom of the fibula, the smaller of the two shin bones, a complete mortise and tenon upper ankle joint, where the rearmost bones of the foot fit into a socket formed by the ends of the tibia and fibula, and an atypical ancestral eutherian dental formula of 5.1.5.34.1.5.3 × 2 = 54. Eomaia had five upper and four lower incisors (much more typical for metatherians) and five premolars to three molars. Placental mammals have only up to three incisors on each top and bottom and four premolars to three molars, but the premolar/molar proportion is similar to placentals.

Eomaia, like other early mammals and living marsupials, had a narrow pelvic outlet suggesting small undeveloped neonates requiring extensive nurturing. Epipubic bones extend forwards from the pelvis; these are not found in any placental, but are found in all other mammals, including non-placental eutherians, marsupials, monotremes and other Mesozoic mammals as well as in the cynodont therapsids that are closest to mammals. Their function is to stiffen the body during locomotion. This stiffening would be harmful in pregnant placentals, whose abdomens need to expand.

== Classification ==
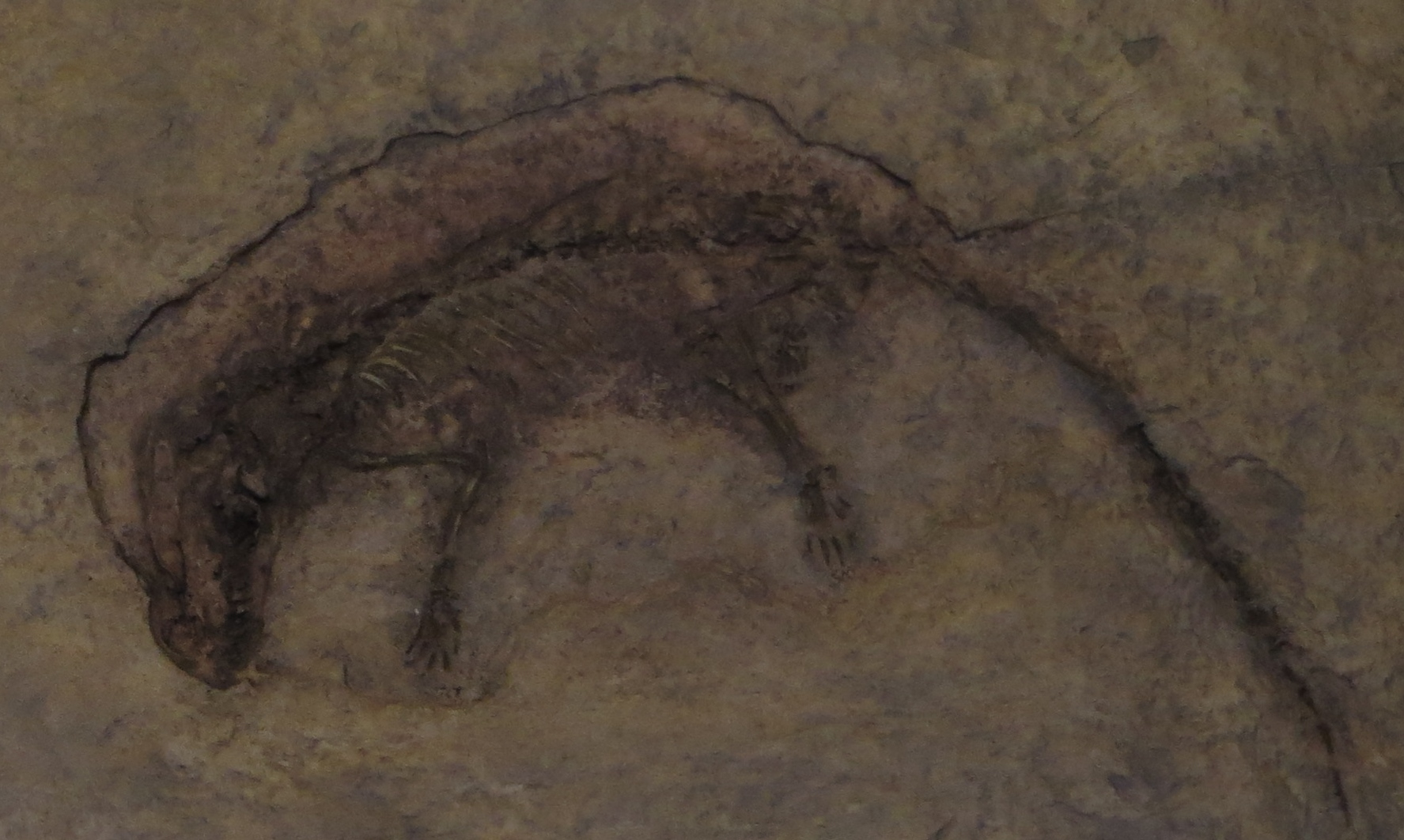
Fossil cast

The discoverers of Eomaia claimed that, on the basis of 268 characters sampled from all major Mesozoic mammal clades and principal eutherian families of the Cretaceous, Eomaia could be placed at the root of the eutherian "family tree" along with Murtoilestes and Prokennalestes. This initial classification scheme is summarized below.

- Theria
  - Metatheria
    - Sinodelphys szalayi
    - Cainozoic metatheria
  - Eutheria
    - Juramaia sinensis
    - Montanalestes keeblerorum
    - - Murtoilestes abramovi
      - Eomaia scansoria
      - Prokennalestes trofimovi
    - Cainozoic placentalia

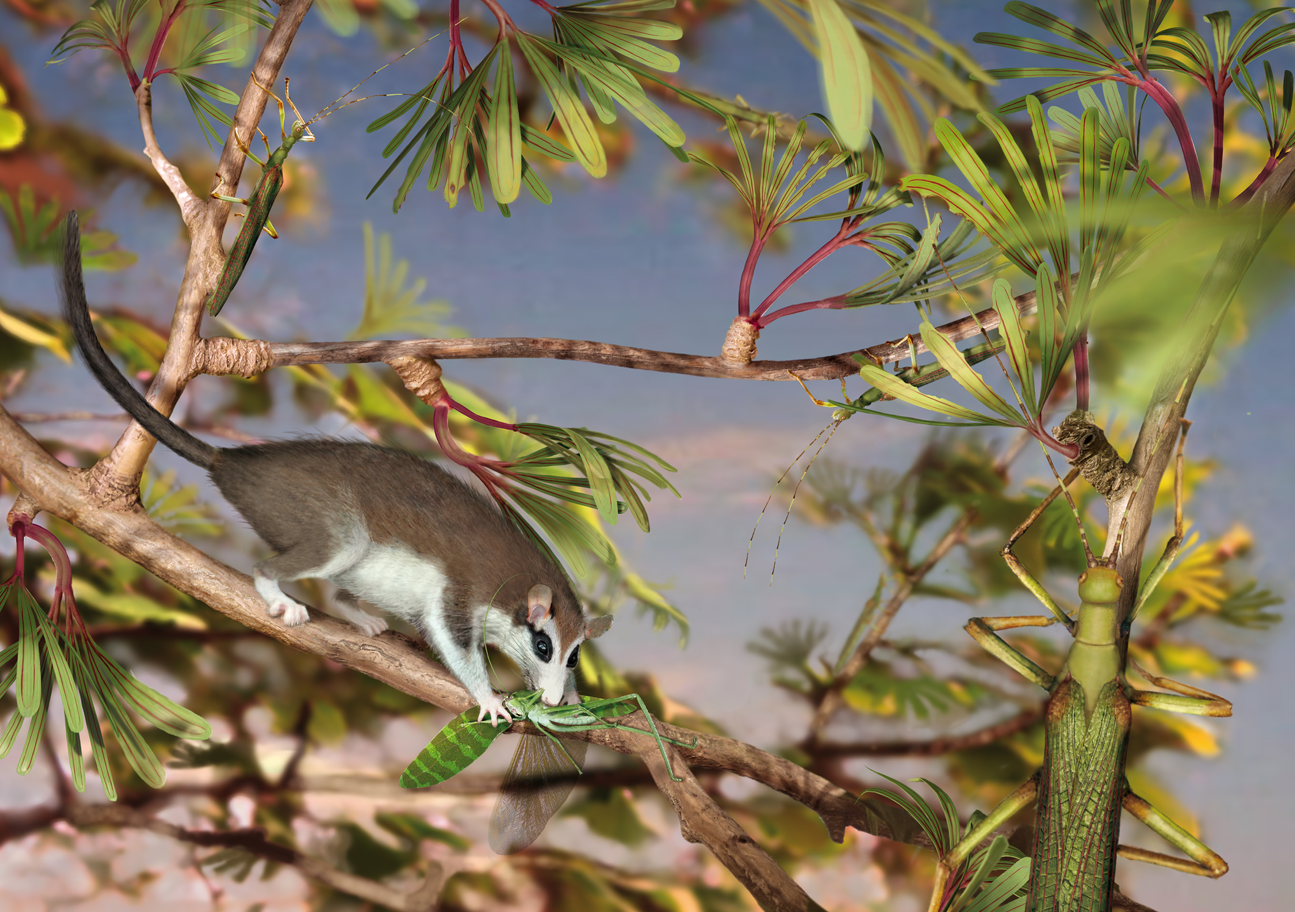
Restoration of Eomaia feeding on the insect Cretophasmomima

In 2013, a much larger study of mammal relationships (including fossil species) was published by O'Leary et al. The study, which examined 4541 anatomical characters of 86 mammal species (including Eomaia scansoria), found "100% jackknife support that Eomaia falls outside of Eutheria as a stem taxon to Theria", and so could not be considered a placental or a eutherian as previously hypothesized. The results of this study are summarized in the cladogram below.

- Mammalia
  - Monotremata
  - - - Henkelotherium guimarotae
      - Zhangheotherium quinquecuspidens
    - - Eomaia scansoria
      - Theria

The 2013 study by O'Leary et al. is part of a debate about the age of origin of placental mammals (see discussions.), and in all trees published in that paper Eomaia fell outside Theria (i.e., debates about the findings of O'Leary et al. have not centered on the position of Eomaia). Meng (2014), who was a co-author on the O'Leary et al. (2013) paper, subsequently referred to Eomaia as a Eutherian but provided no analysis to support this claim. Gheerbrant et al. 2014 mentioned Eomaia in a list of Cretaceous taxa that represented "the primitive eutherian condition" but provided no analytical evidence for this claim; a similar claim was repeated by Sole et al. (2014) again without analytical support.

A 2023 cladistical study again recovered Eomaia as a basal eutherian.

- Metatheria
- Eutheria
  - - †Sinodelphys
    - †Ambolestes
  - †Acristatherium
  - †Microtherulum
  - †Cokotherium
  - - †Juramaia
    - - †Eomaia
      - - †Prokennalestes
        - - †Murtoilestes
          - - †Montanalestes
            - - †Daulestes
              - - - †Ukhaatherium
                  - - †Asioryctes
                    - †Kennalestes
                - - - †Gypsonictops
                    - †Cimolestes
                  - - †Zalambdalestes
                    - - - †Aspanlestes
                        - - †Protungulatum
                          - †Eoungulatum
                      - - †Leptictis
                        - Placentalia

== See also ==
- Evolution of mammals
- Juramaia (160 million years ago)
- The World After Dinosaurs
- Sinodelphys
