= Ambolestes =

Ambolestes Temporal range: Early Cretaceous, 126 Ma
- Fossil cast on display at the Chaoyang Paleontological Museum

Scientific classification
- Kingdom: Animalia
- Phylum: Chordata
- Class: Mammalia
- Clade: Eutheria
- Genus: †Ambolestes; Bi et al., 2018

Type species
- †Ambolestes zhoui Bi et al., 2018

Extinct genus of mammals

Ambolestes is an extinct genus of eutherian mammal from the Early Cretaceous of China. It includes a single species, Ambolestes zhoui, known from a single complete skeleton recovered from the Yixian Formation (126 Ma), part of the fossiliferous Jehol biota. Ambolestes is one of the most basal eutherians, presenting a combination of features from both early eutherians (stem-placentals) and early metatherians (stem-marsupials). This is responsible for the generic name of Ambolestes: "ambo" is Latin for "both", while "-lestes" (Greek for "robber") is a popular suffix for fossil mammals. The species name honors influential Jehol paleontologist Zhou Zhonghe.

== Description ==
Ambolestes was a fairly small mammal, with an estimated mass of 34–44 g (about the size of a modern mouse opossum, Marmosa). It was likely similar in appearance and habits to other putative Yixian Formation therians, such as Eomaia and Sinodelphys.

There are several similarities between Ambolestes and Sinodelphys. Both are interpreted to bear 8 upper postcanine teeth (5 premolars and 3 molars) and 7 lower postcanine teeth (4 premolars and 3 molars) on each side of the skull. The rear premolars are similar to the tall, sharp tribosphenic molars (though the premolars lack a protocone). Earlier premolars are smaller, blade-shaped, and widely spaced. The shape and number of incisors are unknown in Ambolestes, while the canines are distinctively double-rooted. The wrist has enlarged scaphoid, hamate, and triquetrum bones, similar to Sinodelphys and metatherians. Other traits are more similar to Eomaia and eutherians: the mandibular angle is not inturned, and the trapezium bone of the wrist is also large.

Ambolestes preserves an ectotympanic bone of the middle ear, a delicate bone which is rarely preserved in Mesozoic mammal fossils. The ectotympanic is horseshoe-shaped and thickened at its lower half, similar to that of short-tailed opossums (Monodelphis). The lower part of the ectotympanic hosts a small groove, the meckelian sulcus. The sulcus is a vestige of the meckel's cartilage, a thin plate which connected the middle ear ossicles to the jaw in earlier mammals. Like other therians, the front part of the malleus is downcurved and confluent with the front edge of the ectotympanic, according to a facet on the latter bone. Ambolestes is also the first Mesozoic mammal to be discovered with a complete hyoid apparatus. The hyoid consists of seven linked bones, similar to some squirrels, though the thyrohyals (lower lateral prongs) are enlarged, more akin to the five-bone hyoids of marsupials.

== Classification ==
According to a phylogenetic analysis by Bi et al. (2018), Ambolestes forms a small clade with Montanalestes, Acristatherium, and Sinodelphys at the base of Eutheria. In 2022, the new Jehol eutherian Cokotherium was added to the clade, while Acristatherium shifted crownwards (closer to placentals). Ambolestes and its basal eutherian clade prompt a re-evaluation of ancestral conditions at the common ancestor of Eutheria and Metatheria. Sinodelphys, for example, was commonly considered to be the oldest known metatherian in most studies prior to 2018. If interpreted as eutherians, Sinodelphys and Ambolestes would indicate that early eutherians were more metatherian-like than previously considered. The removal of Sinodelphys from Metatheria would also expand the ghost lineage between the oldest eutherian (Juramaia, 160 Ma) and the next oldest metatherians (deltatheroids and marsupialiforms, 110 Ma).
