= Grès de Labarre =

Geological formation in France

- Stratigraphic range: Maastrichtian
- Type: Geological formation

Lithology
- Primary: Sandstone

Location
- Region: Ariège
- Country: France

The Grès de Labarre is a geological formation in France whose strata date back to the Late Cretaceous. Dinosaur remains are among the fossils that have been recovered from the formation.

== Fossil content ==
Color key: Taxon / Reclassified taxon / Taxon falsely reported as present / Dubious taxon or junior synonym / Ichnotaxon / Ootaxon / Morphotaxon	Notes; Uncertain or tentative taxa are in small text; ~~crossed out~~ taxa are discredited.

=== Dinosaurs ===
Dinosaurs of the Grès de Labarre
Genus	Species	Location	Stratigraphic position	Material	Notes	Image
cf. Ampelosaurus	cf. A. atacis	Département de L'Ariege, France			A titanosaurian sauropod	
Rhabdodon	R. priscus	Département de l'Ariege, France			A rhabdodontid ornithopod	

=== Mammals ===
Ornithischians of the Grès de Labarre
Genus	Species	Location	Stratigraphic position	Material	Notes	Image
Azilestes	A. ragei	Département de l'Ariege, France			A zhelestid eutherian	

== See also ==
- List of dinosaur-bearing rock formations
