= Khodzhakul Formation =

Geologic formation in Uzbekistan

- Stratigraphic range: Cenomanian; ~93–89 Ma
- Type: Geological formation
- Underlies: Tamdytruba & Bissekty Formations
- Overlies: Bortesken Formation

Lithology
- Primary: Sandstone

Location
- Coordinates: 40.1°N 65.8°E
- Approximate paleocoordinates: 35.9°S 65.5°E
- Region: Karakalpakstan
- Country: Uzbekistan
- Khodzhakul Formation (Uzbekistan)

The Khodzhakul Formation is a Cenomanian aged geologic formation in Uzbekistan. Dinosaur remains are among the fossils that have been recovered from the formation. As well as those of Mammals. It is part of the same stratigraphic succession as the overlying Bissekty Formation.

== Fossil content ==
Color key: Taxon / Reclassified taxon / Taxon falsely reported as present / Dubious taxon or junior synonym / Ichnotaxon / Ootaxon / Morphotaxon	Notes; Uncertain or tentative taxa are in small text; ~~crossed out~~ taxa are discredited.

One of the largest mammals of the Mesozoic, Oxlestes, occurred in this formation, and may have predated on dinosaur species.

Dinosaurs
Genus	Species	Location	Stratigraphic position	Material	Notes	Images
Asiaceratops	A. salsopaludalis		Upper	"Teeth, cranial fragments, phalanx."		
Gilmoreosaurus	G. atavus		Upper			
Horezmavis	H. eocretaceous		Lower	"Tarsometatarsus."		
Kulceratops	K. kulensis		Upper	"Fragmentary material."		
Pectinodon	P. sp.		Upper			
Therizinosauroidea	Indeterminate		Upper			
Ulughbegsaurus	U. sp.			A right maxilla fragment		
Titanosauria indet.	Indeterminate			Indeterminate titanosaur.		
Ornithomimidae indet.	Indeterminate			Indeterminate ornithomimd.		
Ankylosauridae indet.	Indeterminate			Indeterminate ankylosaurid.		
cf. Alectrosaurus sp	Indeterminate			Remains stated to be similar to Alectrosaurus.		

Pterosaurs
Genus	Species	Notes
Ornithocheiromorpha indet.	Indeterminate	Indeterminate ornithocheirids.
Azhdarchidae Indet.	Indeterminate	Indeterminate azdarchids.

Mammals
Genus	Species	Location	Stratigraphic position	Material	Notes	Images
Bobolestes	B. zenge			Maxilla and dentary fragments	Zalambdalestoidea	
Eozhelestes	E. mangit			dentary fragments and teeth		
Sheikhdzheilia	S. rezvyii			Maxilla and dentary fragments	?Zhelestidae	
Zalambdalestidae	Indeterminate			Right petrosal		
‘‘Zhelestidae’’	Indeterminate			Left dentary and dentary fragment	Large taxon	

== See also ==
- List of dinosaur-bearing rock formations
