= Khuduklestes =

Khuduklestes Temporal range: Late Cretaceous, 93 Ma

Scientific classification
- Domain: Eukaryota
- Kingdom: Animalia
- Phylum: Chordata
- Class: Mammalia
- Family: incertae sedis
- Genus: †Khuduklestes; Sigogneau-Russell et al., 1994

Type species
- †Khuduklestes bohlini Sigogneau-Russell et al., 1994

Extinct family of mammals

Khuduklestes is a genus of extinct mammal of uncertain affinities from the Late Cretaceous of China. It is rather similar to the also carnivorous and taxonomically uncertain Oxlestes, being slightly smaller.

== Description ==
Khuduklestes is currently represented by a single specimen, a vertebral axis, known from Cenomanian deposits in the Gansu Province of China. It is rather similar to Oxlestes and is among the largest vertebral mammalian remains from the Mesozoic, indicating a cat-sized animal.

== Classification ==
Khuduklestes was initially placed in Deltatheroida on the basis of its similarity to Oxlestes. However, much as Oxlestes, its identity as a deltatheroidean has also been questioned, and it has periodically also been considered a member of the eutherian clade of mammals.
