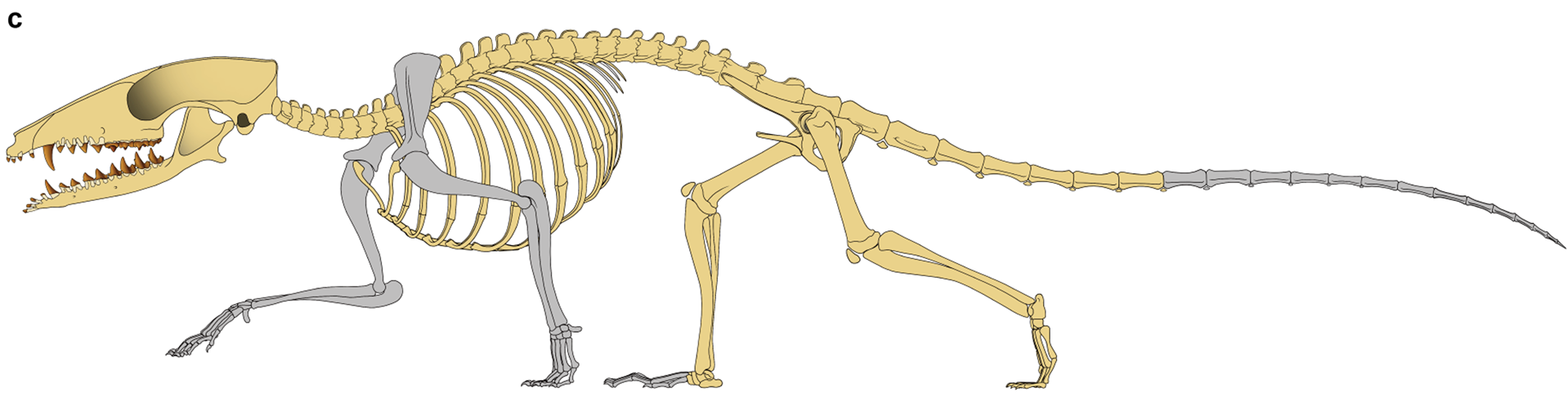
- Skeleton of Microtherulum, a basal eutherian from the Early Cretaceous of China
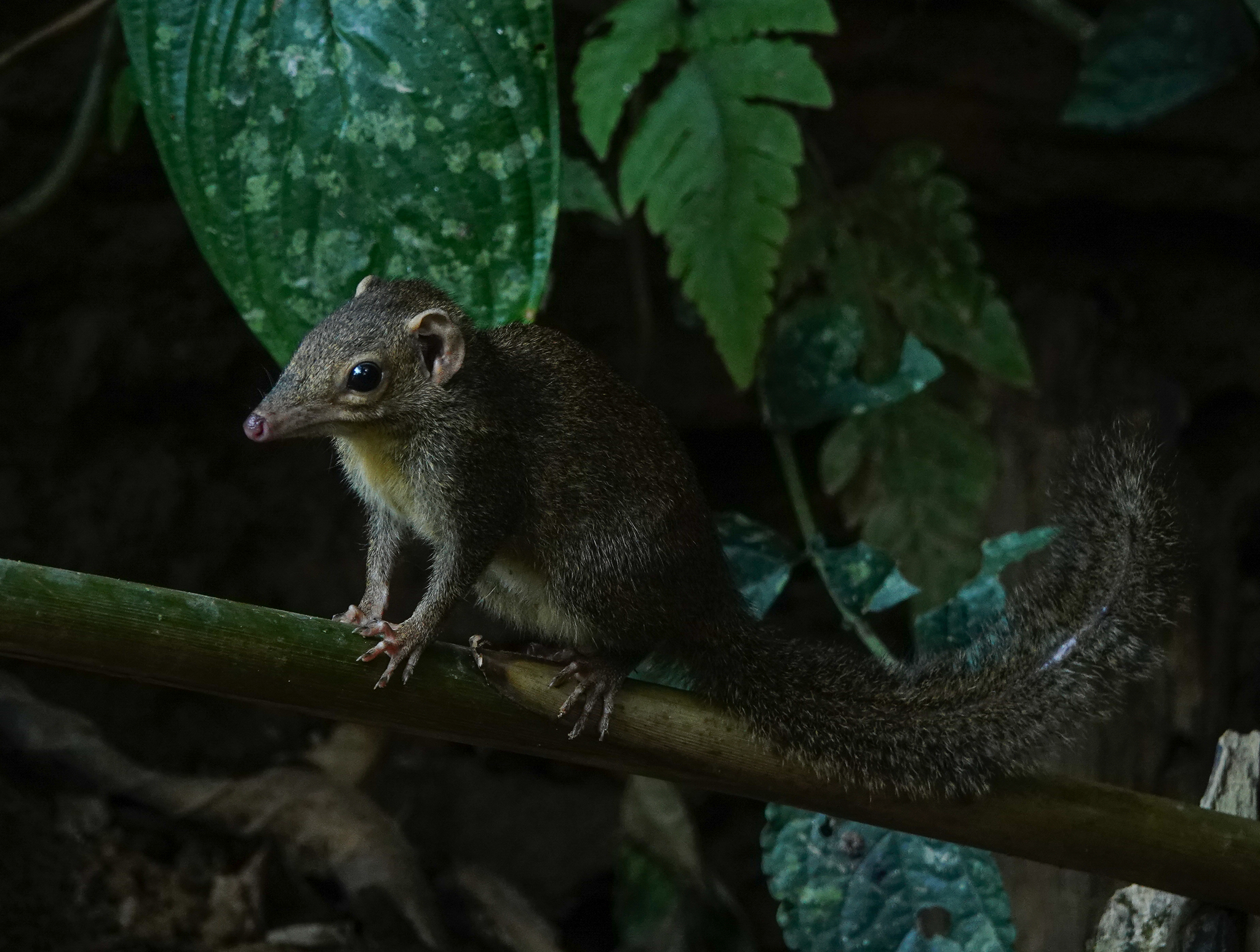
- Northern treeshrew (Tupaia belangeri), a placental eutherian from Southeast Asia

Scientific classification
- Kingdom: Animalia
- Phylum: Chordata
- Class: Mammalia
- Subclass: Theria
- Clade: Eutheria; Gill, 1872

Subgroups
- see text.

Synonyms
- Pan-Placentalia (Averianov, 2014)

= Eutheria =

Eutheria Temporal range: Early Cretaceous–Recent

Clade of mammals in the subclass Theria

Eutheria (from Ancient Greek εὐ- (eú-), meaning "true, well", and θηρίον (thēríon), meaning "beast", and thus, "true beasts"), also called Pan-Placentalia, is the clade consisting of placental mammals and all therian mammals that are more closely related to placentals than to marsupials. Placentalia is the only surviving taxon of eutherians, and Eutheria is often used as a synonym of Placentalia in zoological contexts.

Eutherians are distinguished from non-eutherians by various phenotypic traits of the feet, ankles, jaws and teeth. All living placental mammals lack epipubic bones, which are present in all other living mammals (marsupials and monotremes). This allows for expansion of the abdomen during pregnancy, though epipubic bones are present in a number of primitive eutherians. Eutheria was named in 1872 by Theodore Gill; in 1880, Thomas Henry Huxley defined it to encompass a more broadly defined group than Placentalia.

The earliest unambiguous eutherians are known from the Early Cretaceous Yixian Formation of China, dating around 120 million years ago. Two tribosphenic mammals, Durlstodon and Durlstotherium from the Berriasian age (~145–140 million years ago) of the Early Cretaceous in southern England have also been suggested to represent early eutherians. Another possible eutherian species Juramaia sinensis has been dated at 161 million years ago from the early Late Jurassic (Oxfordian) of China. However some authors have considered Juramaia as a stem therian instead, and some sources have doubted the dating of the specimen.

== Characteristics ==
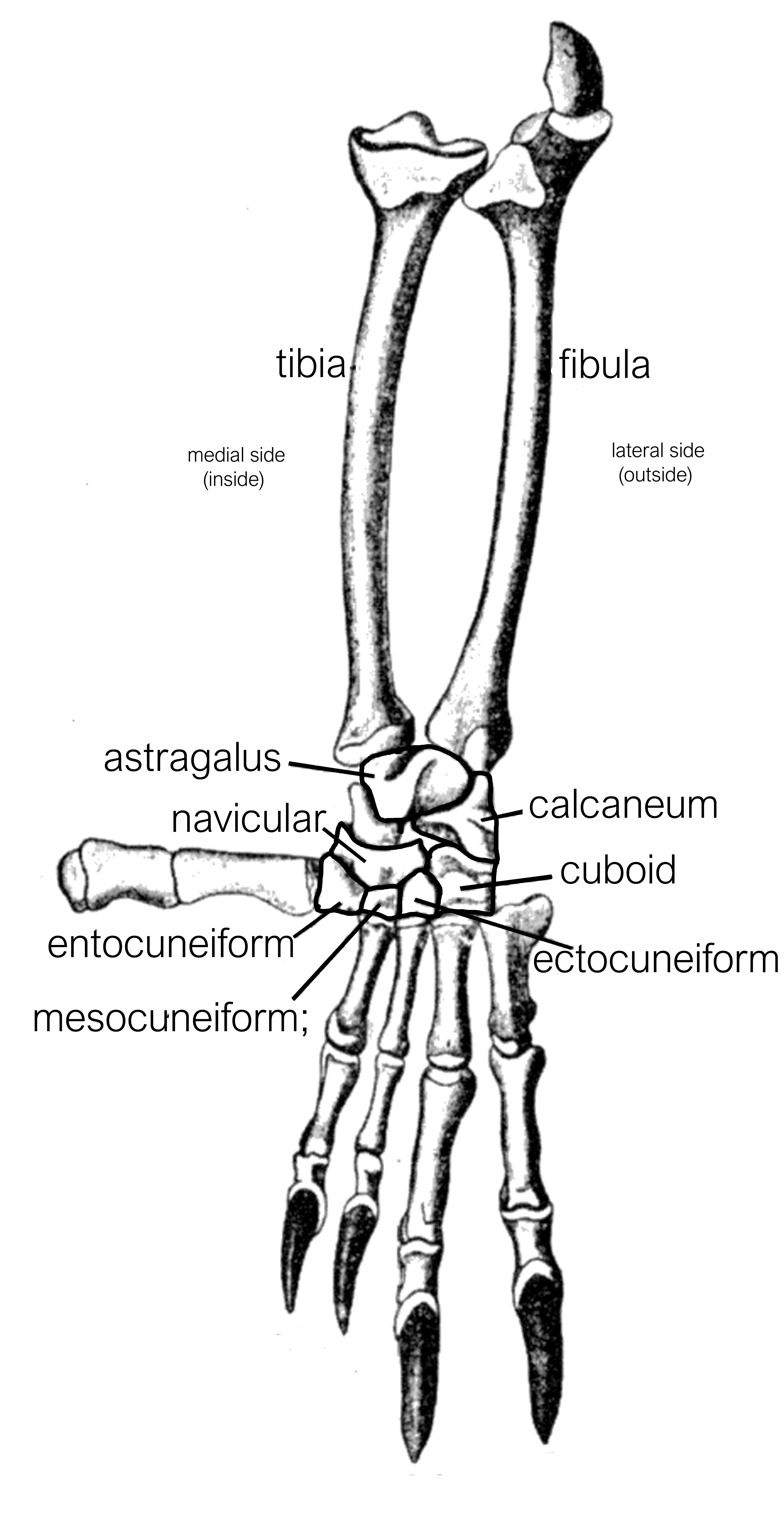
The entocuneiform bone

Distinguishing features are:

- an enlarged malleolus ("little hammer") at the bottom of the tibia, the larger of the two shin bones
- the joint between the first metatarsal bone and the entocuneiform bone (the innermost of the three cuneiform bones) in the foot is offset farther back than the joint between the second metatarsal and middle cuneiform bones—in metatherians these joints are level with each other
- various features of jaws and teeth including: having three molars in the halves of each jaw (which a 2025 study suggested represented a reduction from four in the ancestral therian lower jaw via the loss of the posteriormost lower molar), each upper canine having two roots, the paraconid on the last lower premolar is pronounced, the talonid region of the lower molars is narrower than the trigonid.

Placentals are distinguished from more basal eutherians by the reduction of the five lower premolars found in basal eutherians to four (with the middle third premolar suggested to have been lost in placentals).

== Taxonomy ==
Eutheria (i.e. Placentalia sensu lato, Pan-Placentalia):

- incertae sedis:
  - ?Family †Holoclemensiidae (often considered a basal metatherian)
  - ?Genus †Hyotheridium
  - ?Genus †Endotherium
  - Genus †Durlstodon
  - Genus †Durlstotherium
  - Genus †Microtherulum
  - Genus †Sinodelphys
  - Genus †Cokotherium
  - Genus †Ambolestes
  - Genus †Montanalestes
  - Genus †Indoclemensia
  - ?Family †Horolodectidae (might belong somewhere within Placentalia sensu stricto)
  - ?Genus †Juramaia
  - Genus †Eomaia
- Genus †Acristatherium
- Clade †Tamirtheria ? (monophyly disputed)
  - Genus †Prokennalestes
  - ?Genus †Hovurlestes
  - Genus †Murtoilestes
  - Genus †Bobolestes (inclusive of the former genus Otlestes)
  - Family †Adapisoriculidae (inclusive of the genus †Sahnitherium)
  - Genus †Paranyctoides
  - Family †Zhelestidae (inclusive of the genus Eozhelestes)
  - Family †Cimolestidae (inclusive of the genera †Maelestes and †Batodon)
  - Order †Asioryctitheria
  - Family †Zalambdalestidae
  - Order †Leptictida
  - ?Order †Taeniodonta
  - ?Family †Didymoconidae
- ?Genus †Purgatorius
- ?Genus †Protungulatum
- ?Genus †Oxyprimus
- Infraclass Placentalia sensu stricto

Notes:

- Some older systems contained an order called Cimolesta (sensu lato), which contains the above taxa Cimolestidae, Taeniodonta and Didymoconidae, but also (some or all of) the taxa †Ptolemaiidae, †Palaeoryctidae, †Wyolestidae, †Pantolesta, †Tillodontia, †Apatotheria, †Pantodonta, Pholidota and †Palaeanodonta. Those additional taxa (which are usually considered members of Placentalia sensu stricto) were thus also placed next to Cimolestidae, now classified as basal Eutheria. Creodonta and Dinocerata have also been suggested as basal eutherians.
- Some authors classify the taxa placed at the end of the above system as part of Placentalia sensu stricto. Depending on the author, this applies to taxa placed from (and inclusive of) Leptictida or Asioryctitheria or Adapisoriculidae down to (and inclusive of) Oxyprimus. Specifically, some older authors associated Cimolestidae with Ferae, Zalambdalestidae with Glires, Zhelestidae with Ungulata, and Leptictida and Adapisoriculidae with Lipotyphla or Archonta. All of these are now considered basal Eutheria.

== Evolutionary history ==
The divergence between the ancestors of eutherians and metatherians is likely to have taken place in Asia. The earliest unambiguous eutherians are known from the Early Cretaceous Yixian Formation of China, dating around 120 million years ago. Two tribosphenic mammals, Durlstodon and Durlstotherium from the Berriasian age (~145–140 million years ago) of the Early Cretaceous in southern England have also been suggested to represent early eutherians. Another possible eutherian species Juramaia sinensis has been dated at 161 million years ago from the early Late Jurassic (Oxfordian) of China. However some authors have considered Juramaia as a stem therian instead, and some sources have doubted the dating of the specimen.

Eutheria contains several extinct genera as well as larger groups, many with complicated taxonomic histories still not fully understood. Members of the Adapisoriculidae, Cimolesta and Leptictida have been previously placed within the outdated placental group Insectivora, while zhelestids have been considered primitive ungulates. However, more recent studies have suggested these enigmatic taxa represent stem group eutherians, more basal to Placentalia. Many non-placental eutherians are thought to have been insectivores, as is the case with many primitive mammals. However, the zhelestids are thought to have been herbivorous. Body size of eutherians was generally small during the Cretaceous period, but the range of body sizes increased dramatically after the K-Pg extinction, predominantly among placentals, corresponding with heightened diversification and evolutionary rates during this time period.

The weakly favoured cladogram favours Boreoeutheria as a basal eutherian clade as sister to the Atlantogenata.

- Placentalia
  - Atlantogenata
    - Xenarthra
    - Afrotheria
  - Boreoeutheria
    - Laurasiatheria
    - Euarchontoglires

Phylogeny after Wang & Wang, 2023.

- Theria
  - Metatheria
  - Eutheria
    - - †Sinodelphys
      - †Ambolestes
    - †Acristatherium
    - †Microtherulum
    - †Cokotherium
    - - †Juramaia
      - - †Eomaia
        - - †Prokennalestes
          - - †Murtoilestes
            - - †Montanalestes
              - - †Daulestes
                - - - †Ukhaatherium
                    - - †Asioryctes
                      - †Kennalestes
                  - - - †Gypsonictops
                      - †Cimolestes
                    - - †Zalambdalestes
                      - - - †Aspanlestes
                          - - †Protungulatum
                            - †Eoungulatum
                        - - †Leptictis
                          - Placentalia

Below is a phylogeny from Gheerbrant & Teodori (2021):

- - Eutheria
    - - †Eomaia
      - †Prokennalestes
      - †Murtoilestes
    - - †Bobolestes
      - - †Montanalestes
        - - †Paranyctoides
          - †Zhelestidae
            - †Sheikhdheilia
            - - †Lainodon
              - †Alostera
              - - †Eozhelestes
                - Avitotherium
                - †Parazhelestes
                - †Aspanlestes
                - †Zhelestes
                - - †Borisodon
                  - †Gallolestes
                - - †Eoungulatum
                  - - †Valentinella
                    - †Azilestes
        - - - †Bulaklestes
            - †Daulestes
            - †Uchkududon
          - - - †Cimolestes
              - - †Maelestes
                - †Batodon
            - - - †Kennalestes
                - - †Asioryctes
                  - †Ukhaatherium
              - - †Deccanolestes
                - - - †Kulbeckia
                    - - †Zhangolestes
                      - - - †Zalambdalestes
                          - †Barunlestes
                        - - †Alymlestes
                          - †Mistralestes
                  - - - †Gypsonictops
                      - †Leptictis
                    - - - †Purgatorius
                        - - †Protungulatum
                          - †Oxyprimus
                      - - - - †Arctocyon
                            - - †Vulpavus
                              - †Miacis
                          - - †Diacodexis
                            - - †Hyopsodus
                              - - †Meniscotherium
                                - †Phenacodus
                        - - - - extant Placentalia
