= Ravjaa =

Ravjaa Temporal range: Late Cretaceous

Scientific classification
- Domain: Eukaryota
- Kingdom: Animalia
- Phylum: Chordata
- Class: Mammalia
- Family: †Zhelestidae
- Genus: †Ravjaa
- Species: †R. ishiii

Binomial name
- †Ravjaa ishiii Okoshi et al., 2025

Extinct genus of mammals

Ravjaa ishiii is an extinct species of zhelestid mammal from the Late Cretaceous of Mongolia. It is the type and only known species of the genus Ravjaa, which was described in 2025 based on a partial mandible recovered from the Bayanshiree Formation in the Gobi Desert.

== Discovery ==
The holotype specimen, MPC-M 100s/001, is a partial right dentary with a damaged premolar and three molars. It was recovered in 2019 from fluvial deposits of the Bayanshiree Formation near Bayan Shiree in the Gobi Desert. The fossil was found by a joint expedition of the Mongolian Academy of Sciences and Okayama University of Science.

== Taxonomy ==
Ravjaa ishiii belongs to the family Zhelestidae, an extinct group of eutherian mammals known from the Late Cretaceous of Eurasia and North America. Phylogenetic analysis places Ravjaa ishiii as a sister taxon to the subfamily Zhelestinae. The species is distinguished by unique dental and mandibular features not found in other zhelestids. It may represent one of the oldest members of the group.

=== Etymology ===
The genus name Ravjaa honors Dulduityn Danzanravjaa, a revered 19th-century Mongolian Buddhist figure. The species name ishiii commemorates Ken-ichi Ishii, director of the Hayashibara Museum of Natural Sciences in Japan.

== Description ==
Ravjaa ishiii is among the smallest known zhelestids and is distinguished by several features that set it apart from other members of the group. These include a weakly developed coronoid crest, a shallow masseteric fossa, and a concave dorsal margin of the dentary. It also lacks a labial mandibular foramen. The second molar is notably tall, reaching approximately 70 percent of the height of the jaw below it. The molars display characteristics typical of zhelestids. The protoconid and metaconid cusps are nearly equal in height, and the rear cusps are positioned close together. The rounded shape of the cusps and the relatively low trigonid angle suggest dietary adaptations for processing plant material, supporting the interpretation of Ravjaa ishiii as primarily frugivorous or omnivorous.

== Paleoenvironment and evolution ==
The specimen was recovered from fluvial sediments of the Bayanshiree Formation, dated to the Cenomanian-Santonian (approximately 96–90 million years ago). The formation is less arid than the overlying Djadokhta and Baruungoyot formations, suggesting a more humid environment favorable to zhelestids. The absence of multituberculates at the site, contrasting with their dominance in other Mongolian formations, raises the possibility of ecological separation or competition between multituberculates and zhelestids.
