= Sikuomys =

Sikuomys Temporal range: Late Cretaceous

Scientific classification
- Kingdom: Animalia
- Phylum: Chordata
- Class: Mammalia
- Order: †Leptictida
- Family: †Gypsonictopidae
- Genus: †Sikuomys; Eberle, Clemens, Erickson & Druckenmiller, 2023

Type species
- †Sikuomys mikros Eberle, Clemens, Erickson & Druckenmiller, 2023

Species
- S. mikros

Extinct genus of eutherian mammal

Sikuomys is a genus of early eutherian mammals from the Late Cretaceous of Alaska. It is known from a few teeth and part of a jawbone in deposits of Campanian age and, as of 2023, is the only known Mesozoic eutherian mammal to have lived north of the then location of the Arctic Circle. Estimated to have weighed between 6 and 18 g (0.2 and 0.6 oz), it was also unusually small for the time, similar in size to a modern shrew. It was likely insectivorous and would probably have used burrows or nests to shelter during the Arctic winter, since it is thought to have been too small to have hibernated or migrated over significant distances.
