= Oxlestes =

Oxlestes Temporal range: Late Cretaceous, 93 Ma

Scientific classification
- Domain: Eukaryota
- Kingdom: Animalia
- Phylum: Chordata
- Class: Mammalia
- Clade: Eutheria
- Genus: †Oxlestes; Nessov et al., 1982

Type species
- †Oxlestes grandis Nessov et al., 1982

Extinct family of mammals

Oxlestes is an extinct mammal from the Late Cretaceous of Asia, more specifically from the Cenomanian of Uzbekistan. A carnivorous species of uncertain affinities, it is notable for its relatively large size, being among the largest of all Mesozoic mammals. Due to the limited amount of material, it has been considered a nomen dubium.

== Description ==
Oxlestes is currently a monotypic genus, containing a single species, O. grandis. Its specimens were recovered in the Cenomanian-aged Khodzhakul Formation of Uzbekistan. The holotype, CCMGE 6/11758, is composed of an axis vertebra, dentaries, canine teeth and a sagittal crest.

The axis is relatively narrow, with a long, pointed anterior process. There are two pairs of distinct foramina anterior and posterior to the dorsal transverse suture; modern placentals only bear one. It is about 1.9 centimeters long.

The dentaries are short and robust, with a convex central border. The masseteric fossa is deep, and the canine is long and deep. The skull has been suggested to be about 10 centimeters long; one axis and dentary comparison to zhelestids and rabbits would make it somewhat smaller at 7.5 centimeters, though this has since been contested.

Overall, the available proportions seem to indicate an animal comparable in size to the largest of modern mustelids and mid-sized felines.

== Classification ==
Oxlestes was initially referred to Palaeoryctidae, a eutherian family, based on comparisons with several other Cretaceous eutherians like Zalambdalestes, Barunlestes and Asioryctes (none of which considered to be palaeoryctids anymore; Palaeoryctidae as a whole may be invalid). Posterior efforts have cautiously referred it to the metatherian clade Deltatheroida, mostly based on size and its carnivorous speciations, but recent studies have shown no evidence of specifically deltatheroidean or even metatherian characters. Averinov and Archibald et al. 2005 referred it to the eutherian clade Zhelestidae, suggesting a close relation to Sheikhdzheilia though this too is not entirely certain.

== Ecology ==
Oxlestes was among the largest mammals of the Mesozoic, being comparable in size to modern mammalian predators such as wolverines and mid-sized cats. Its deep sagittal crest and masseteric fossae are indicative of powerful jaw musculature, and it possessed deep canines, both characteristics of predatory mammals. Some of these are shared with the contemporary deltatheroidean mammals, to which it could be related. If Oxlestes was a zhelestid, it would set a precedent in an otherwise herbivorous clade.

It is larger than some contemporary dinosaur species. Some researchers have even suggested that it could have predated on the local small ceratopsians such as Asiaceratops.
