= Hyotheridium =

Hyotheridium Temporal range: Santonian–Campanian

Scientific classification
- Kingdom: Animalia
- Phylum: Chordata
- Class: Mammalia
- Genus: †Hyotheridium; Gregory & Simpson, 1926
- Species: †H. dobsoni

Binomial name
- †Hyotheridium dobsoni Gregory & Simpson, 1926

Late Cretaceous-era mammal

Hyotheridium is a possible Eutherian from the Late Cretaceous (?late Santonian–early Campanian) Djadochta Formation of Mongolia. It also could be a Deltatheriid, although the fossil, a poorly preserved skull with the upper and lower jaws connected in a way that makes them hard to separate and to examine, makes it difficult to determine what it is.
