= Prozalambdalestes =

Prozalambdalestes Temporal range: Aptian–Albian

Scientific classification
- Domain: Eukaryota
- Kingdom: Animalia
- Phylum: Chordata
- Class: Mammalia
- Order: incertae sedis
- Family: †Zalambdalestidae
- Genus: †Prozalambdalestes
- Species: †P. cratodus

Binomial name
- †Prozalambdalestes cratodus Lopatin & Averianov, 2024

Extinct genus of zalambdalestid

Prozalambdalestes is an extinct genus of zalambdalestid that lived during the Early Cretaceous epoch.

== Distribution ==
Prozalambdalestes cratodus is known from the Khovoor locality in Mongolia.
