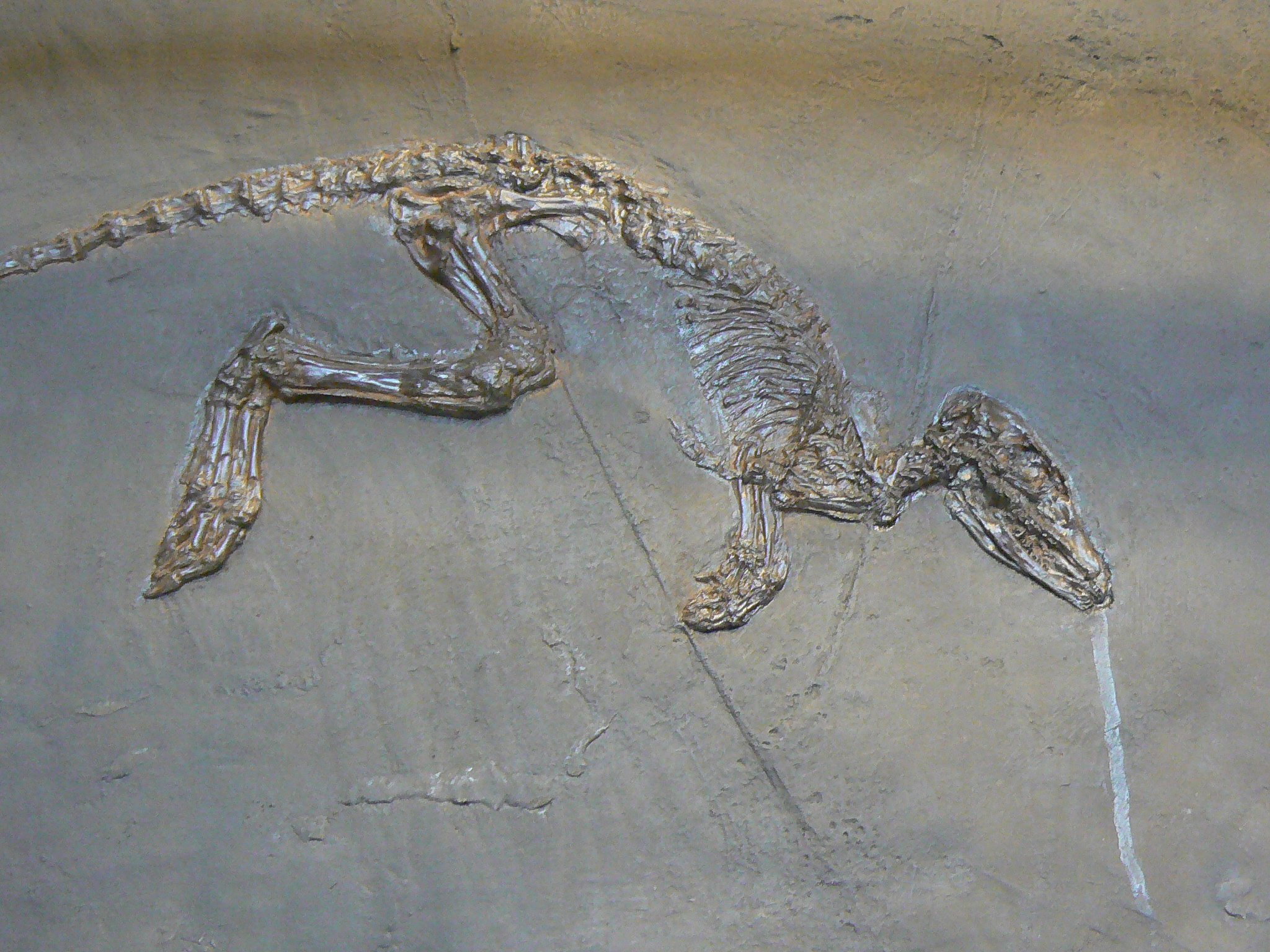
- Fossil specimen of Leptictidium auderiense

Scientific classification
- Kingdom: Animalia
- Phylum: Chordata
- Class: Mammalia
- Clade: Eutheria
- Order: †Leptictida; McKenna, 1975

Subgroups
- †Gypsonictopidae; †Leptictidae; †Pseudorhyncocyonidae; Placentalia?

= Leptictida =

Leptictidans Temporal range: Late Cretaceous - Oligocene Possible descendant taxon Placentalia survives to present 70–33 Ma

Extinct order of mammals

Leptictida (leptos iktis "small/slender weasel") is a possibly paraphyletic extinct order of eutherian mammals. Their classification is contentious: according to cladistic studies, they may be (distantly) related to Euarchontoglires (rodents, primates and their relatives), although they are more recently regarded as the first branch to split from basal eutherians. One recent large-scale cladistic analysis of eutherian mammals favored leptictidans as close to the placental crown-clade; and several other recent analyses that included data from Cretaceous non-eutherian mammals found Leptictis to belong to the superorder Afrotheria.

The most recent phylogenetic studies recover it as actually a paraphyletic assemblage leading to Placentalia.

== Description ==
The leptictids are a characteristic example of the non-specialized placental mammals that took part in the late Cretaceous-Paleocene evolutionary radiation, originally bunched together in the order Insectivora. The leptictids became extinct during the Oligocene. Their archaic cranium and dentition make it difficult to determine their relationship to other groups. Leptictid postcranial anatomy has been studied from the well-preserved middle Eocene Leptictidium specimens found at Messel, Germany.

Judging from these specimens, lepticids were small stem-placentals with a body length ranging from 60 to 90 cm (24 to 35 in). The head had a long and slender snout, probably featuring a short trunk, which may have been used for scratching the undergrowth in search of insects and worms. The mouth's archaic dentition included two or three incisors, a canine, and V-shaped cheek-teeth - four premolars and three molars.

Their forelegs were shortened, but their hind legs were elongated. While this anatomy is reminiscent of small kangaroos and jerboas, suggesting a jumping locomotion, the structure of the tarsal bones hints at a specialization for terrestrial running. Perhaps these animals were capable of both modes of locomotion; running slowly in search for food, and jumping quickly to avoid threats. Additionally, the Messel specimens feature a surprisingly long tail, unique among modern placental mammals, formed by 40 vertebrae and probably used for balance.

== Classification ==
- Order Leptictida
  - Family Gypsonictopidae
    - Genus Gypsonictops
    - Genus Sikuomys
  - Family Leptictidae
    - Genus Amphigyion
    - Genus Gallolestes
    - Genus Labes
    - Genus Lainodon
    - Genus Palaeictops
    - Genus Praolestes
    - Genus Wania
    - Subfamily Leptictinae
      - Genus Blacktops
      - Genus Ictopidium
      - Genus Leptictis
      - Genus Ongghonia
      - Genus Prodiacodon
      - Genus Protictops
  - Family Pseudorhyncocyonidae
    - Genus Diaphyodectes
    - Genus Leptictidium
    - Genus Phakodon
    - Genus Pseudorhyncocyon
