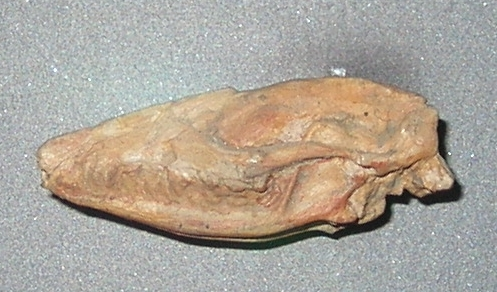
- Asioryctes nemegtensis skull

Scientific classification
- Kingdom: Animalia
- Phylum: Chordata
- Class: Mammalia
- Clade: Eutheria
- Order: †Asioryctitheria; Novacek et al., 1997

Genera
- Asioryctes; Kennalestes; Sasayamamylos; Ukhaatherium

= Asioryctitheria =

Asioryctitheria Temporal range: 109–77 Ma Albian–Campanian

Extinct order of early eutherians

Asioryctitheria ("Asian digging beasts") is an extinct order of early eutherians.

== Skull structure ==
With the exception of Prokennalestes, these advanced forms lacked a Meckelian groove. Furthermore, they were equipped with double-rooted canines, a lower premolar with a reduced or absent metaconid and a more elongated lower premolar than their predecessors. In addition, the entoconid and hypoconulid on the lower molars are untwinned, the entotympanic is non-existent, the alisphenoid is enlarged, a Vidian foramen is present as well as a promontorium linked to the paroccipital process via the crista interfenestralis.

== Classification ==
Asioryctitheria contains at least four genera and two families.

- Sasayamamylos kawaii Kusuhashi et al., 2013
- Kennalestidae Kielan-Jaworowska, 1981
  - Kennalestes gobiensis Kielan-Jaworowska, 1981
- Asioryctidae Szalay, 1977
  - Asioryctes nemegetensis Kielan-Jaworowska, 1975
  - Ukhaatherium nesovi Novacek et al., 1997
