= Borisodon =

Borisodon Temporal range: 93.5–89.3 Ma Turonian

Scientific classification
- Kingdom: Animalia
- Phylum: Chordata
- Class: Mammalia
- Family: †Zhelestidae
- Genus: †Borisodon; Archibald & Averianov, 2012
- Species: †B. kara

Binomial name
- †Borisodon kara (Nessov, 1993)

Extinct genus of mammals

Borisodon is an extinct genus of eutherians which existed in what is now Kazakhstan during the Turonian age. It was described by J. David Archibald and Alexander Averianov in 2012, as a new genus for the species Sorlestes kara, which was originally described by Nessov in 1993. The type specimen was a mandible (CCMGE 101/12455), discovered at Near Ashchikol' Lake, drill core. Borisodon was a tree-climbing insectivore.
