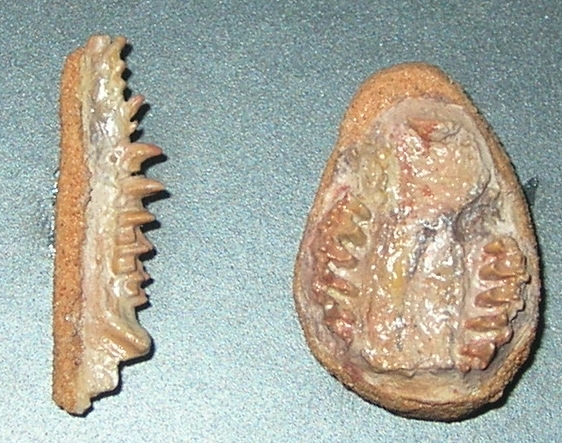
- Zalambdalestes lechei skull and lower jaw, Museum of Evolution Warsaw.
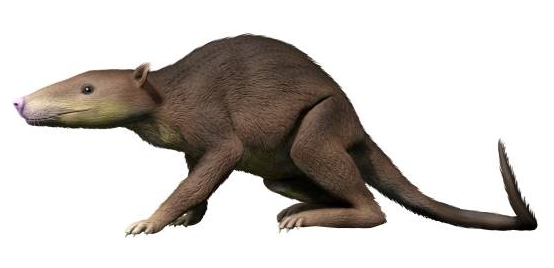
- Life reconstruction of Zalambdalestes lechei

Scientific classification
- Kingdom: Animalia
- Phylum: Chordata
- Class: Mammalia
- Subclass: Theria
- Clade: Eutheria
- Family: †Zalambdalestidae; Gregory & Simpson, 1926

Genera
- †Alymlestes; †Anchilestes; †Barunlestes; †Kulbeckia; †Prozalambdalestes; †Zalambdalestes; †Zhangolestes; †Zofialestes; †Zoslestes

= Zalambdalestidae =

Zalambdalestes Temporal range: Aptian–Campanian

Extinct family of mammals

Zalambdalestidae is a clade of Asian eutherians occurring during the Cretaceous. Once classified as Glires, features like epipubic bones and various cranial elements have identified these animals as outside of Placentalia, representing thus a specialised clade of non-placental eutherians without any living descendants, and potentially rather different from modern placentals in at least reproductive anatomy.

== Taxonomy ==
The exact position of Zalambdalestidae within Eutheria varies, though they are generally agreed to be more basal than zhelestids. A 2026 paper suggested that zhelestids were the sister group to zalambdalestids.

== Palaeobiology ==
Zalambdaltestids were insectivores, having zalambdodont molars much as various modern insectivorous species. They are uniquely suited to a saltatorial, cursorial lifestyle, bearing long, semi-digitigrade limbs and a spinal column similar to that of modern lagomorphs. Like most non-placental mammals, the presence of epipubic bones probably meant that they gave birth to poorly developed young much like modern marsupials and monotremes, though a study on multituberculate reproduction may suggest they and other early eutherians reproduced like modern placentals.

A study on Zalambdalestes suggests they had a unique axial morphology. This allowed for quick prey capture, and may suggest they had spines or bristly fur in life.
