= Valentinella =

Valentinella Temporal range: Maastrichtian

Scientific classification
- Domain: Eukaryota
- Kingdom: Animalia
- Phylum: Chordata
- Class: Mammalia
- Family: †Zhelestidae
- Genus: †Valentinella (Tabuce et al., 2004)

Type species
- †V. vitrollense (Tabuce et al., 2004)

Extinct genus of mammals

Valentinella is a Late Cretaceous genus of eutherian mammal from France. It was originally known from some damaged lower and upper jaws, and was cautiously referred to the lainodontine zhelestid mammals. This identification was later questioned and even considered a nomen dubium by some researchers, and remains uncertain due to the scarcity and fragmentary nature of the fossils.

Valentinella was the third known Late Cretaceous eutherian mammal genus from Europe, after Labes and Lainodon. It was found at Vitrolles-La Plaine in the Aix-en-Provence Basin (Maastrichtian in age), in south-eastern France.
