= Ukhaatherium =

Ukhaatherium Temporal range: Campanian ~84–72 Ma

Scientific classification
- Kingdom: Animalia
- Phylum: Chordata
- Class: Mammalia
- Order: †Asioryctitheria
- Family: †Asioryctidae
- Genus: †Ukhaatherium; Novacek, Rougier, Wible, McKenna, Dashzeveg & Horovitz, 1997
- Species: †U. nessovi

Binomial name
- †Ukhaatherium nessovi Novacek, Rougier, Wible, McKenna, Dashzeveg & Horovitz, 1997

Extinct species of mammal

Ukhaatherium is an extinct species of mammal that lived during the upper Cretaceous about 84 to 72 million years ago in today's East Asia. It is known above all from the fossil locality Ukhaa Tolgod, Mongolia. An adult Ukhaatherium has an estimated weight of about 32g and bears several similarities to lipotyphlan insectivorans such as the tenrec.

== Taxonomy ==
Ukhaatherium is a genus from the family of the Asioryctitheria, which lived in the late Cretaceous. Ukhaatherium and Asioryctes form the subfamily Asioryctinae, while Kennalestes stands somewhat outside this group.

== Description ==
Ukhaatherium nessovi, the type and only species for the genus, is known from multiple near-complete specimens. The most notable feature of the species is the presence of epipubic bones in the pelvic girdle, which have been lost in extant eutherian mammals. The loss of epipubic bones is associated with the evolution of prolonged gestation in eutherian mammalian reproduction. This means that Ukhaatherium may have had a short gestation period resulting in the birth of altricial young, like monotremes, marsupials, and extinct Mesozoic mammals such as multituberculates. This supports the hypothesis that the presence of epipubic bones is the primitive mammalian condition.

Despite some primitive skull and dental traits, the skeletons of Ukhaatherium and two other asioryctitheres, Asioryctes and Kennalestes, are classed as eutherians and show several similarities with the extant lipotyphlans. Derived eutherian characteristics include the restriction of the upper ankle joint to the parasagittal plane.

== Fossil findings ==
Since the year 1990, joint expeditions of the American Museum of Natural History and the Mongolian Academy of Sciences have taken place in the Gobi desert of southern Mongolia in order to investigate upper Cretaceous and Tertiary vertebrates. More than 500 mammalian skulls (many of which with corresponding postcranial skeletons) were discovered at the Ukhaa Tolgod fossil field between 1993 and 1997, together with very well-preserved dinosaur skeletons, eggs, and embryos, birds, and lizards. Fossils of two species of basal eutherian mammal were found, including the first known Ukhaatherium specimens and a new Zalambdalestes specimen. These originate from the Djadochta Formation.
