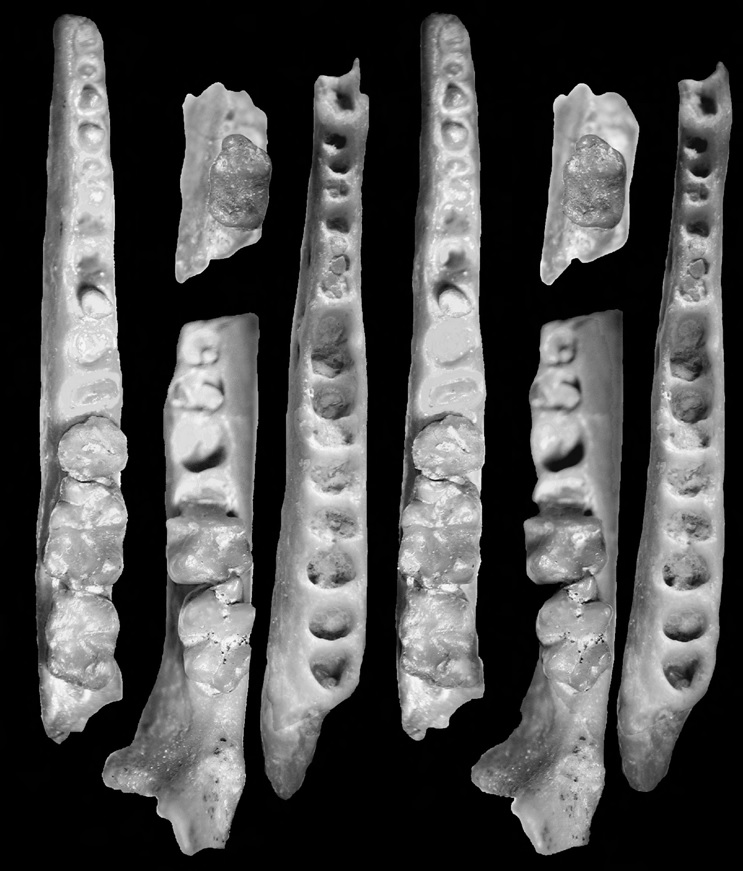
- Stereophotographs in occlusal views of lower dentitions of Paranyctoides aralensis.

Scientific classification
- Kingdom: Animalia
- Phylum: Chordata
- Class: Mammalia
- Subclass: Theria
- Clade: Eutheria
- Genus: †Paranyctoides; Fox, 1979

Type species
- Paranyctoides sternbergi Fox, 1979

Other species
- Paranyctoides maleficus? Fox, 1984; Paranyctoides quadrans? (Nessov, 1982)

= Paranyctoides =

Paranyctoides Temporal range: Late Cretaceous, Santonian–Campanian

Extinct genus of marsupials

Paranyctoides is an extinct genus of early eutherian mammal from the Late Cretaceous of North America and possibly Asia. It was named in 1979 by Fox for tooth and jaw material from the Dinosaur Park Formation of Alberta, which he named Paranyctoides sternbergi. Fox then named the second species P. maleficus for material from the older Milk River Formation. The species P. megakeros was named by Lillegraven and McKenna in 1986 from the "Mesaverde" Formation of Wyoming, and indeterminate species of Paranyctoides have been identified from the Kaiparowits, Wahweap, Kirtland, Hell Creek and Lance Formations of western North America. Material from the Maastrichtian Hell Creek and Lance Formations, as well as P. megakeros, have since been identified as Alostera saskatchewanensis, limiting Paranyctoides to the Santonian to Campanian in North America. In 2013 Averianov and Archibald considered P. maleficus a synonym of P. sternbergi, though this was not supported by Montellano-Ballesteros and colleagues the same year.

Species of Paranyctoides have also been identified from Uzbekistan, first being named P. aralensis by Lev Nesov in 1993 for material from the Turonian Bissekty Formation. Additional Asian specimens were found and referred to Paranyctoides expanding its range to the younger Aitym Formation, before Averianov and Archibald considered that all the Uzbek specimens belonged to the same species, which they identified as P. quadrans, being an older name Nesov had coined in 1982 for a species of Sailestes. The referral of Asian species and material to Paranyctoides was not supported by Montellano-Ballesteros and colleagues, though it was found within the genus in a phylogenetic analysis by Averinanov and Archibald.
