= Lipotyphla =

Obsolete order of mammals

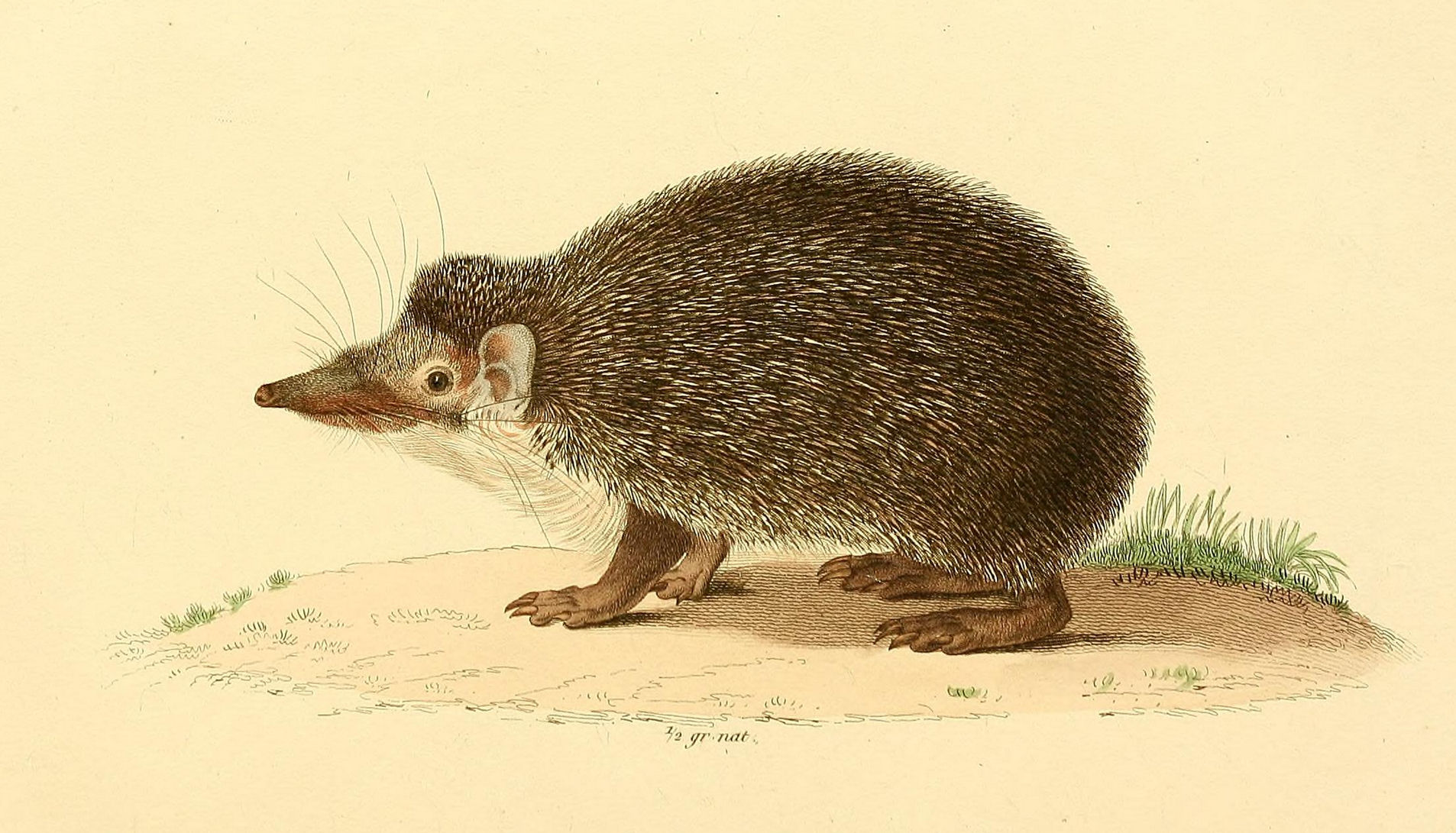
Lipotyphla

Lipotyphla (/ˌlaɪpəˈtɪflə/) is an obsolete order of mammals, whose name means "lacking a blind gut", that included the members of the order Eulipotyphla (i.e. the solenodons, family Solenodontidae; hedgehogs and gymnures, family Erinaceidae; desmans, moles, and shrew-like moles, family Talpidae; and true shrews, family Soricidae) as well as three other families of the former order Insectivora, Chrysochloridae (golden moles), Tenrecidae (tenrecs), and Potamogalidae (otter shrews). However, molecular studies found the golden moles, tenrecs, and otter shrews to be unrelated to the others (these afrothere groups were then put in their own order, Afrosoricida). This made Lipotyphla an invalid polyphyletic order and gave rise to the notion of Eulipotyphla instead, an exclusively laurasiathere grouping.
