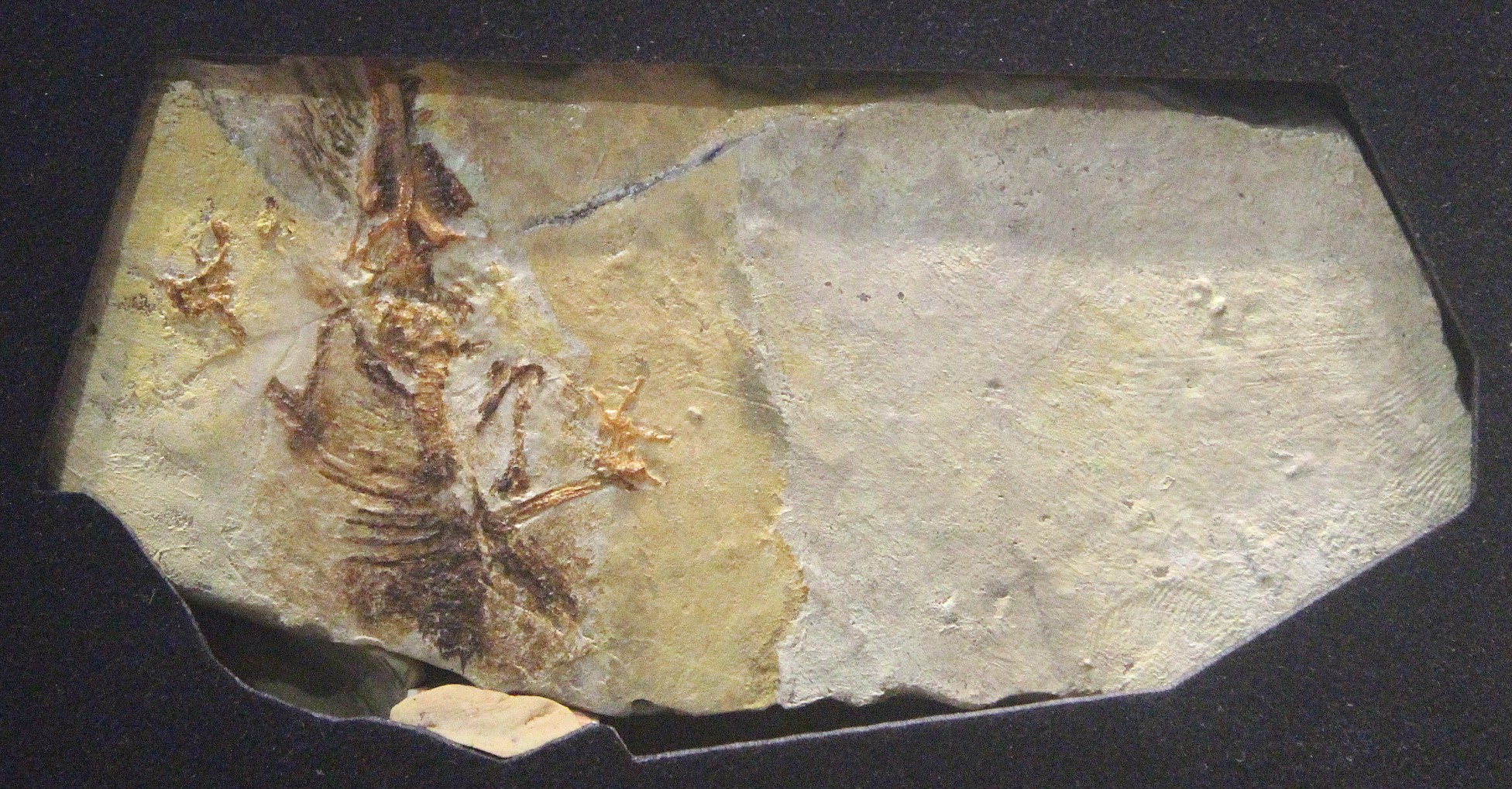
- Holotype specimen (BMNH PM 1343B) of J. sinensis, National Natural History Museum of China

Scientific classification
- Kingdom: Animalia
- Phylum: Chordata
- Class: Mammalia
- Subclass: Theria
- Genus: †Juramaia; Luo et al., 2011

Species
- †J. sinensis Luo et al., 2011 (type)

= Juramaia =

Juramaia Temporal range: ?Late Jurassic

Extinct genus of therian mammal

Juramaia is an extinct genus of a therian mammal, possibly a very basal eutherian mammal, known from the Late Jurassic (Oxfordian stage) or Early Cretaceous deposits of western Liaoning, China. It is a small shrew-like mammal weighing around 15–17 grams (0.53–0.60 oz).

== Discovery ==
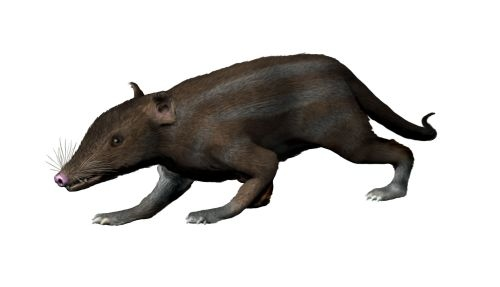
Life restoration

Juramaia is known from the holotype BMNH PM1343, an articulated and nearly complete skeleton including incomplete skull preserved with full dentition. It was collected in the Daxigou site, Jianchang in 2009, from the Tiaojishan Formation dated at about 160 million years ago. It was first named by Zhe-Xi Luo, Chong-Xi Yuan, Qing-Jin Meng and Qiang Ji in 2011 and the type species is Juramaia sinensis.

== Classification ==
The discovery of Juramaia provides new insight into the evolution of placental mammals by showing that their lineage diverged from that of the marsupials 35 million years earlier than previously thought. Furthermore, its discovery fills gaps in the fossil record and helps to calibrate modern, DNA-based methods of dating the evolution. Based on climbing adaptations found in the forelimb bones, it has been suggested that the basal stock of Eutheria was arboreal, in a manner resembling that of modern rats.

- - Metatheria
    - Sinodelphys szalayi
    - Cenozoic metatherian
  - Eutheria
    - Juramaia sinensis
    - Montanalestes keeblerorum
    - - Murtoilestes abramovi
      - Eomaia scansoria
      - Prokennalestes trofimovi
    - Cenozoic placentalia

However, Sweetman et al. (2017) considered Juramaia as a stem therian instead, and the Late Jurassic dating has been questioned, with King and Beck (2020) suggesting that Juramaia may originate from Early Cretaceous based on tip-dating analyses, which would make it contemporaneous to several other known eutherians.

== See also ==
- Eomaia
