= Mistralestes =

Mistralestes Temporal range: Campanian

Scientific classification
- Kingdom: Animalia
- Phylum: Chordata
- Class: Mammalia
- Family: †Zhelestidae
- Genus: †Mistralestes
- Species: †M. arcensis

Binomial name
- †Mistralestes arcensis Tabuce et al., 2013

Extinct genus of zhelestid eutherian

Mistralestes is an extinct monotypic genus of zhelestid mammal that lived on the Ibero-Armorican Island during the Campanian stage of the Late Cretaceous epoch.

== Description ==
The type species, Mistralestes arcensis, is distinguished by its compression of the trigonid from M_{1} to M_{3}, a transversely oriented protocristid, and a robust and premolariform P_{5} lacking a cingulid, metaconid, and paraconid.
