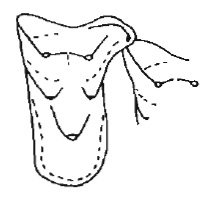

Scientific classification
- Kingdom: Animalia
- Phylum: Chordata
- Class: Mammalia
- Order: †Cimolesta
- Family: †Cimolestidae
- Genus: †Batodon; Marsh, 1892
- Species: †B. tenuis

Binomial name
- †Batodon tenuis Marsh, 1892

= Batodon =

Batodon Temporal range: Campanian–Maastrichtian Possible Danian Record(?)

Batodon is an extinct genus of cimolestid mammal that lived in North America during the Late Cretaceous period, 66 million years ago.

== Diet ==
Batodon was an insectivorous mammal which means it ate small bugs, instead of small reptiles.

== Extinction ==
Batodon lived in the Maastrichtian, and may have survived the K-Pg extinction.
