= Kulbeckia =

Kulbeckia Temporal range: Turonian–Santonian

Scientific classification
- Kingdom: Animalia
- Phylum: Chordata
- Class: Mammalia
- Order: incertae sedis
- Family: †Zalambdalestidae
- Genus: †Kulbeckia
- Species: †K. kulbecke

Binomial name
- †Kulbeckia kulbecke Nessov, 1993

Extinct genus of zalambdalestid mammals

Kulbeckia is an extinct monotypic genus of zalambdalestid mammal that lived in Central Asia from the Turonian to the Santonian stages of the Late Cretaceous epoch.

== Description ==
Kulbeckia kulbecke shows significant intraspecific variation in how many premolars it possesses. Some individuals never lose their dP^{3} and dP_{3} because it never gets replaced, while others lack enough space in their tooth row to develop the third premolars.
