= Maelestes =

Maelestes Temporal range: Late Cretaceous

Scientific classification
- Domain: Eukaryota
- Kingdom: Animalia
- Phylum: Chordata
- Class: Mammalia
- Order: †Cimolesta
- Family: †Cimolestidae
- Genus: †Maelestes; Wible et al., 2007
- Species: †M. gobiensis

Binomial name
- †Maelestes gobiensis Wible et al., 2007

Extinct genus of mammal

Maelestes is a prehistoric shrew-like mammal discovered in 1997 in the Gobi Desert. The animal lived in the late Cretaceous Period, around 71–75 million years ago, and was a contemporary of dinosaurs such as Velociraptor and Oviraptor. According to some scientists, the discovery and analysis of this species suggests that true placental mammals appeared near the time the non-avian dinosaurs became extinct 66 million years ago, not much earlier in the Cretaceous as thought by others. However, the presence of an epipubic bone, among other characteristics, place it as a non-placental eutherian.

== Reproduction ==
Although Maelestes was a eutherian, it was not a placental mammal. The presence of an epipubic bone suggests that it could not expand its torso the same way placentals can, forcing it to give birth to small, relatively undeveloped young like modern marsupials. Like modern marsupials, it might have had a pouch, though there is no evidence for this and many marsupials like shrew opossums lack pouches.
