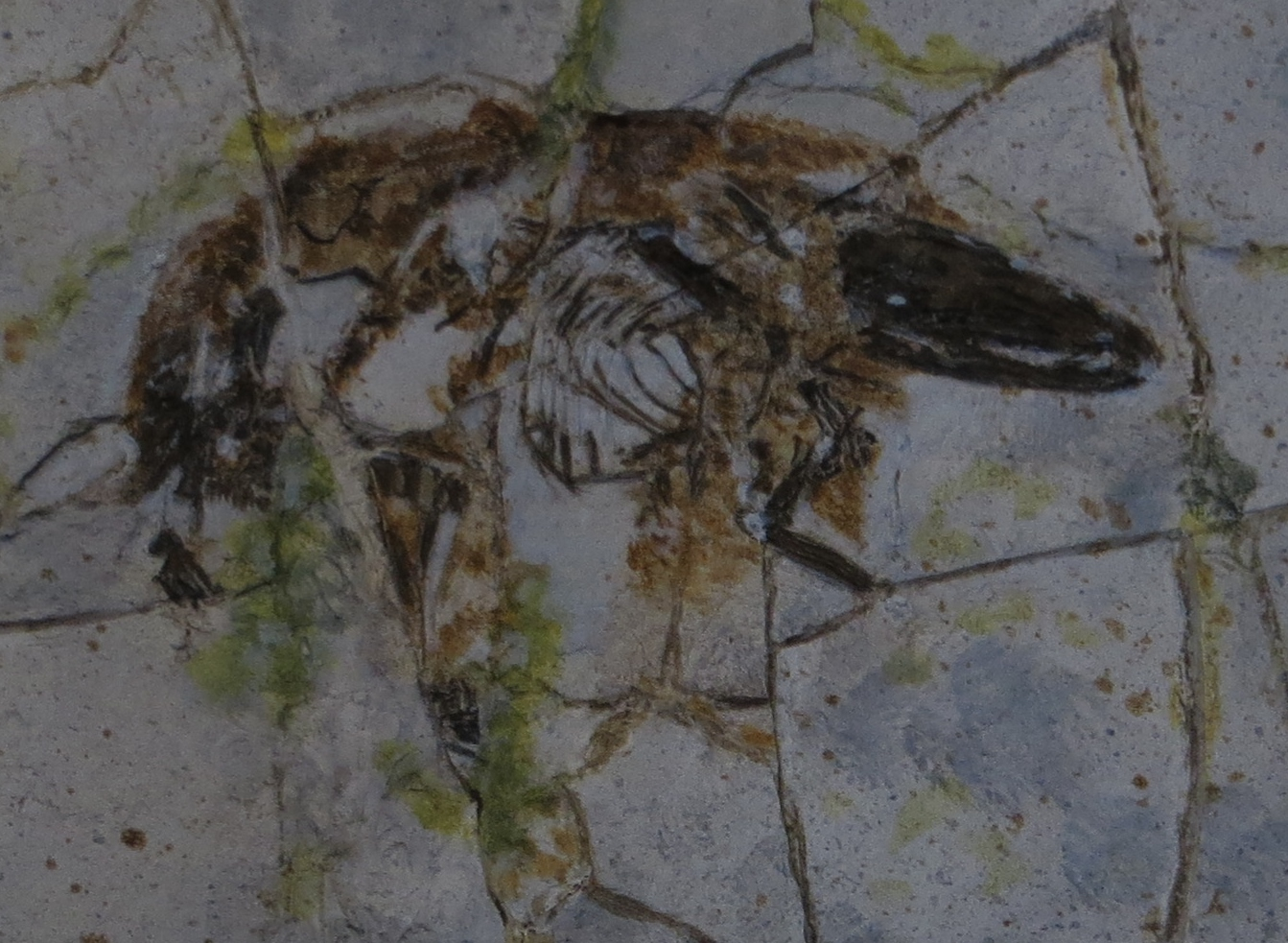
- A reproduction of the holotype displayed at the French National Museum of Natural History, Paris

Scientific classification
- Kingdom: Animalia
- Phylum: Chordata
- Class: Mammalia
- Clade: Eutheria
- Genus: †Sinodelphys; Luo et al., 2003

Type species
- †Sinodelphys szalayi Luo et al., 2003

= Sinodelphys =

Sinodelphys Temporal range: Early Cretaceous, 125 Ma

Extinct genus of therian mammals

Sinodelphys is an extinct mammal from the Early Cretaceous, estimated to be 125 million years old. It was discovered and described in 2003 in rocks of the Yixian Formation in Liaoning Province, China, by a team of scientists including Zhe-Xi Luo and John Wible. While initially suggested to be the oldest known metatherian, later studies interpreted it as a eutherian.

== Description ==
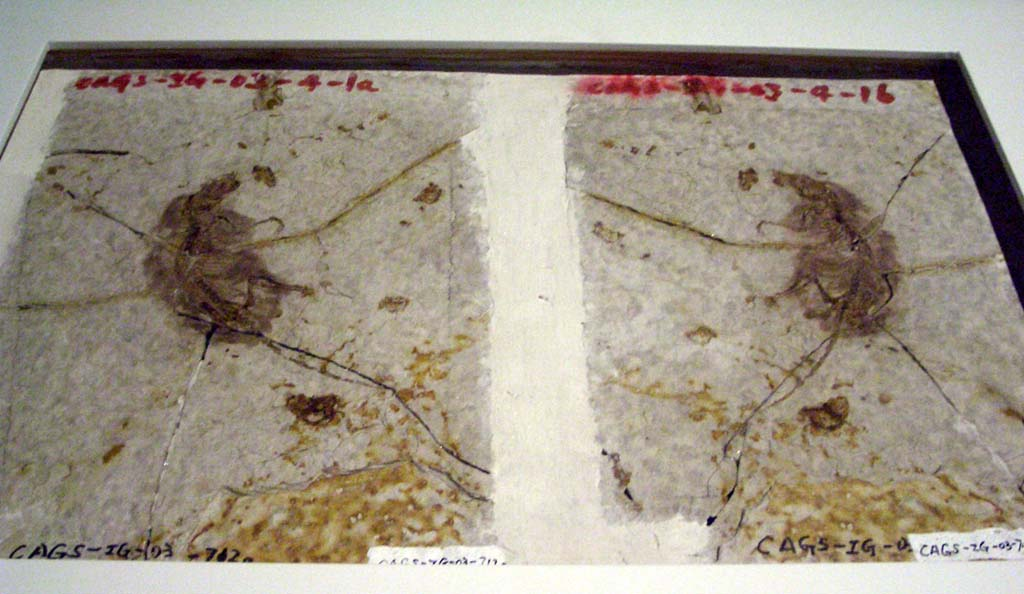
A specimen displayed at the Hong Kong Science Museum

The holotype specimen is a slab and counterslab given catalog number CAGS00-IG03. It is in the collection of the Chinese Academy of Geological Sciences.

Sinodelphys szalayi grew only 15 cm (5.9 in) long and possibly weighed about 30 g (1.05 oz). Its fossilized skeleton is surrounded by impressions of fur and soft tissue, thanks to the exceptional sediment that preserves such details. Luo et al. (2003) inferred from the foot structure of Sinodelphys that it was a scansorial tree-dweller, like the contemporary Eomaia and modern opossums such as Didelphis. Sinodelphys probably hunted worms and insects.

== Taxonomy ==
Sinodelphys szalayi, living in China around 125 million years ago, was initially interpreted as the earliest known metatherian. This makes it almost contemporary to the eutherian Acristatherium, which has been found in the same area. However, Bi et al. (2018) reinterpreted Sinodelphys as an early member of Eutheria.

== See also ==
- Eomaia
- Evolution of mammals
