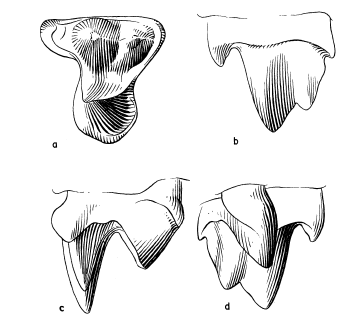
- P4 tooth of a specimen

Scientific classification
- Kingdom: Animalia
- Phylum: Chordata
- Class: Mammalia
- Order: †Leptictida
- Family: †Gypsonictopidae; Van Valen, 1967
- Genus: †Gypsonictops; Simpson, 1927

Species
- G. clemensi; G. dormaalensis; G. hypoconus; G. illuminatus; G. lewisi; G. petersoni

= Gypsonictops =

Gypsonictops Temporal range: Campanian–Maastrichtian Possible Paleocene record

Extinct genus of mammals

Gypsonictops is an extinct genus of leptictidan mammals of the family Gypsonictopidae, which was described in 1927 by George Gaylord Simpson. Species in this genus were small mammals and the first representatives of the order Leptictida, that appeared during the Upper Cretaceous.

The genus is thought to have gone extinct before the Cenozoic began, but there are indications that it may have survived into the early Paleocene. Fossils have been found in the United States, Belgium, and Uzbekistan.

Like Cimolestes or Daulestes, it is possible that they had some distant relationship with the ungulates. It is one of the few eutherians that existed in North America during the Campanian, a period in which the multituberculates and the metatherians were the dominant ones on the continent.

== Description ==
Like other prehistoric mammals of the Upper Cretaceous in North America, Gypsonictops had a particular dentition, with five premolars double-rooted in the lower jaw, while the vast majority of mammals only had four. On the other hand, the five premolars also were a very typical feature of the most primitive eutherians.

In the same way as the species of the genus Leptictidium, the P4 premolar was highly molarized, which caused confusion when analyzing a specimen of G. petersoni between P4 and molar M1. Eventually, P4 was found to be a paraconid-free premolar.

== Taxonomy ==
The genus Gypsonictops was first classified within the family Leptictidae, by Simpson, along with all Leptictida of North America. This classification was maintained until 1967, when Leigh Van Valen created the family Gypsonictopidae for the genus. In 1997, Malcolm C. McKenna and Susan K. Bell suggested the possibility that this family contained up to seven different genera, but documents published since then have shown a high degree of skepticism about the proposal. An additional genus within the family, Sikuomys, was named in 2023.

It is known that Gypsonictops were eutherians and that they could be placentals, as they show very typical characteristics of these animals, although they belong to the Leptictida group, which includes some of the few non-placental eutherians. Furthermore, the line between placental and non-placental eutherians is very thin, so the classification of Gypsonictops with precision is a very complicated task.

== Species ==
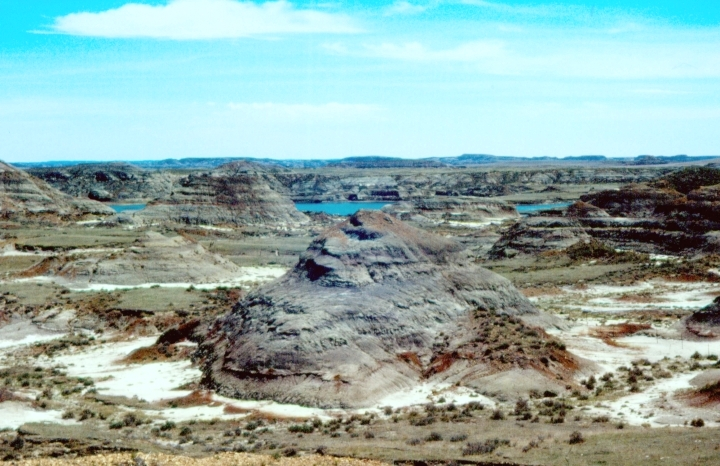
Hell Creek Formation, Montana. In this place have been found various species of Gypsonictops.

The genus Gypsonictops contains six species:

=== Gypsonictops clemensi ===
Described by J. K. Rigby and D. L. Wolberg in 1987. It inhabited the planet during the Campanian and Maastrichtian periods. Its description was made from a molar M3 found in New Mexico. The name of the species is dedicated to the American paleontologist William A. Clemens.

=== Gypsonictops dormaalensis ===
Described by G. E. Quinet in 1964. The name of the species refers to the Belgian population of Dormaal, a city in which there is an important fossil deposit in which fossils of G. dormaalensis.

=== Gypsonictops hypoconus ===
Described by G. G. Simpson in 1927. It lived during the Campanian and Maastrichtian periods, and fossils have been found in the Hell Creek Formation and other sites in the United States. When Simpson created the genus Gypsonictops to define this species, placed it within the family Leptictidae, which was then part of the Insectivara order, now obsolete. The name of the species refers to its hypocone, the lower cusp of the molar teeth.

=== Gypsonictops illuminatus ===
Described by J. A. Lillegraven in 1969. It lived during the Maastrichtian, and fossils have been found in the Hell Creek Formation, in the United States, as well as in various paleontological sites in Canada.

=== Gypsonictops lewisi ===
Described by A. Sahni in 1972. It lived during the Campanian. Fossils of the species have been found in the Judith River Formation, Montana. G. lewisi is one of the species with more typical characteristics of the placental s of the genus, such as the fusion of a small metaconid with a long protoconid, or a small talonid with two cusps. On the other hand, the premolar es are not as molarized as in other species of the genus. They usually used to weigh over fifty gram s. The species name is dedicated to the Captain Meriwether Lewis, a celebrated American explorer.

=== Gypsonictops petersoni ===
Described in 1929 by G. G. Simpson, who named the species "Euangelistes petersoni" and wrongly classified it within the infraclass Marsupialia. It is known with certainty that they inhabited the planet during the Maastrichtian, but it is possible that they could have survived the Cretaceous-Paleogene mass extinction and lived until the Danian. The holotype of this species is in the Carnegie Museum of Natural History and it is a lower jaw that had been badly damaged. Another specimen, preserved at Yale University, has been described by up to five different names. In case there was not enough controversy on the subject, in 1973, Clemens stated that G. petersoni was the same species as G. hypoconus.

== Bibliography ==
- Lillegraven, J. A. (1969). Latest Cretaceous mammals of upper part of Edmonton Formation of Alberta, Canada, and review of marsupial-placental dichotomy in mammalian evolution. University of Kansas Paleontological Contributions vol.50, p. 1-122.
- Sahni, A. (1972). The vertebrate fauna of the Judith River Formation, Montana. Bulletin of the American Museum of Natural History vol.147, nº6, p. 321-412.
- Novacek, M. J. (1977). A review of Paleocene and Eocene Leptictidae (Mammalia: Eutheria) from North America. University of California Museum of Paleontology.
- Fox, R. C. (1979). Mammals from the Upper Cretaceous Oldman Formation, Alberta. III. Eutheria. Revue canadienne des sciences de la Terre.
- Rigby, J. K., D. L. Wolberg (1987). The therian mammalian fauna (Campanian) of Quarry 1, Fossil Forest study area, San Juan Basin, New Mexico. Geological Society of America.
