= Montanalestes =

Montanalestes Temporal range: 110 Ma Middle Cretaceous

Scientific classification
- Domain: Eukaryota
- Kingdom: Animalia
- Phylum: Chordata
- Class: Mammalia
- Subclass: Theria
- Clade: Eutheria
- Genus: †Montanalestes; Cifelli, 1999

Species
- M. keeblerorum Cifelli, 1999 (type)

Extinct family of mammals

Montanalestes is an extinct mammal known from the Cretaceous in North America.

== Classification ==
Known from only six fossil teeth, Montanalestes is an example of the less well-preserved early eutherians found on the northern hemisphere, apparently more closely related to later eutherians than Prokennalestes, and Murtoilestes.

- - Metatheria
    - Sinodelphys szalayi
    - Cenozoic metatherian
  - Eutheria
    - Juramaia sinensis
    - Montanalestes keeblerorum
    - - Murtoilestes abramovi
      - Eomaia scansoria
      - Prokennalestes trofimovi
    - Cenozoic placentalia
