= Acristatherium =

Acristatherium Temporal range: Early Cretaceous, 125 Ma

Scientific classification
- Kingdom: Animalia
- Phylum: Chordata
- Class: Mammalia
- Clade: Eutheria
- Genus: †Acristatherium; Hu et al., 2010

Type species
- †Acristatherium yanensis Hu et al., 2010

Extinct monospecific genus of basal eutherian

Acristatherium yanensis is an extinct basal eutherian from the Early Cretaceous (early Aptian, about 125 million years ago) Lujiatun Bed of the Yixian Formation. It was described on the basis of a single specimen (holotype) from Beipiao, Liaoning, China, by Yaoming Hu, Jin Meng, Chuankui Li, and Yuanqing Wang in 2010. The specimen comprises a partial skull, 25 mm (0.98 in) long. It appears to possess a vestige of a septomaxilla, a feature only otherwise seen in nonmammalian therapsids.
