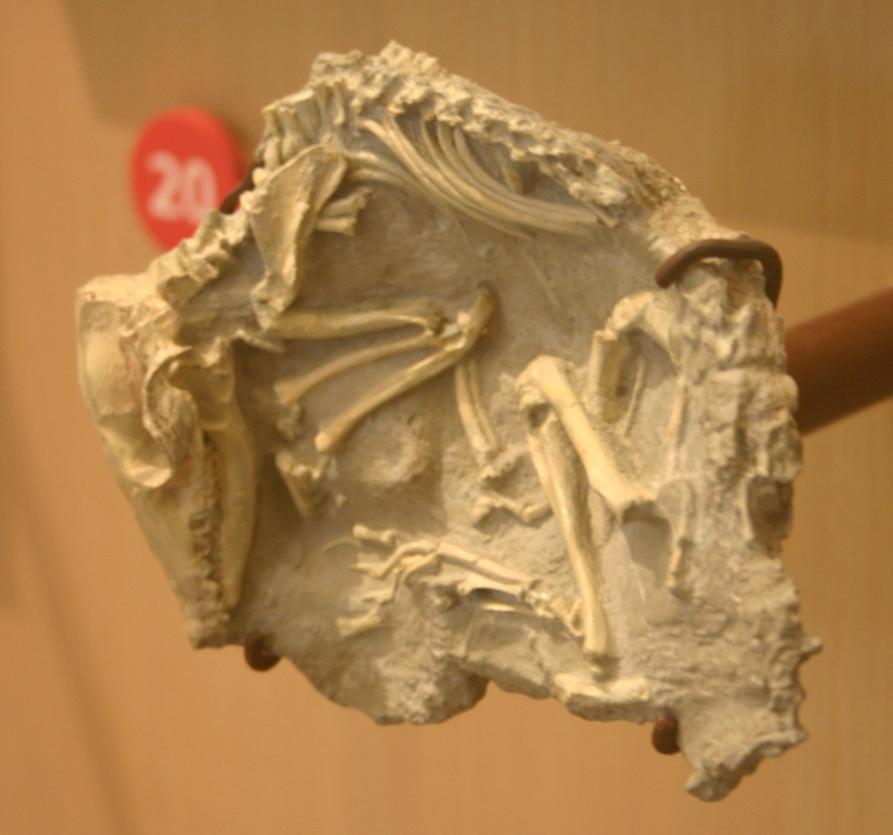
- Leptictis cf. acutidens

Scientific classification
- Kingdom: Animalia
- Phylum: Chordata
- Class: Mammalia
- Order: †Leptictida
- Family: †Leptictidae
- Subfamily: †Leptictinae
- Genus: †Leptictis; Leidy, 1868

Type species
- †Lepticitis haydeni Leidy, 1868

Species
- †L. acutidens; †L. (Ictops) dakotensis; †L. douglassi; †L. haydeni; †L. montanus; †L. thomsoni; †L. wilsoni

= Leptictis =

Leptictis Temporal range: Late Eocene to Early Oligocene, 37.2–30.8 Ma

Extinct genus of mammals

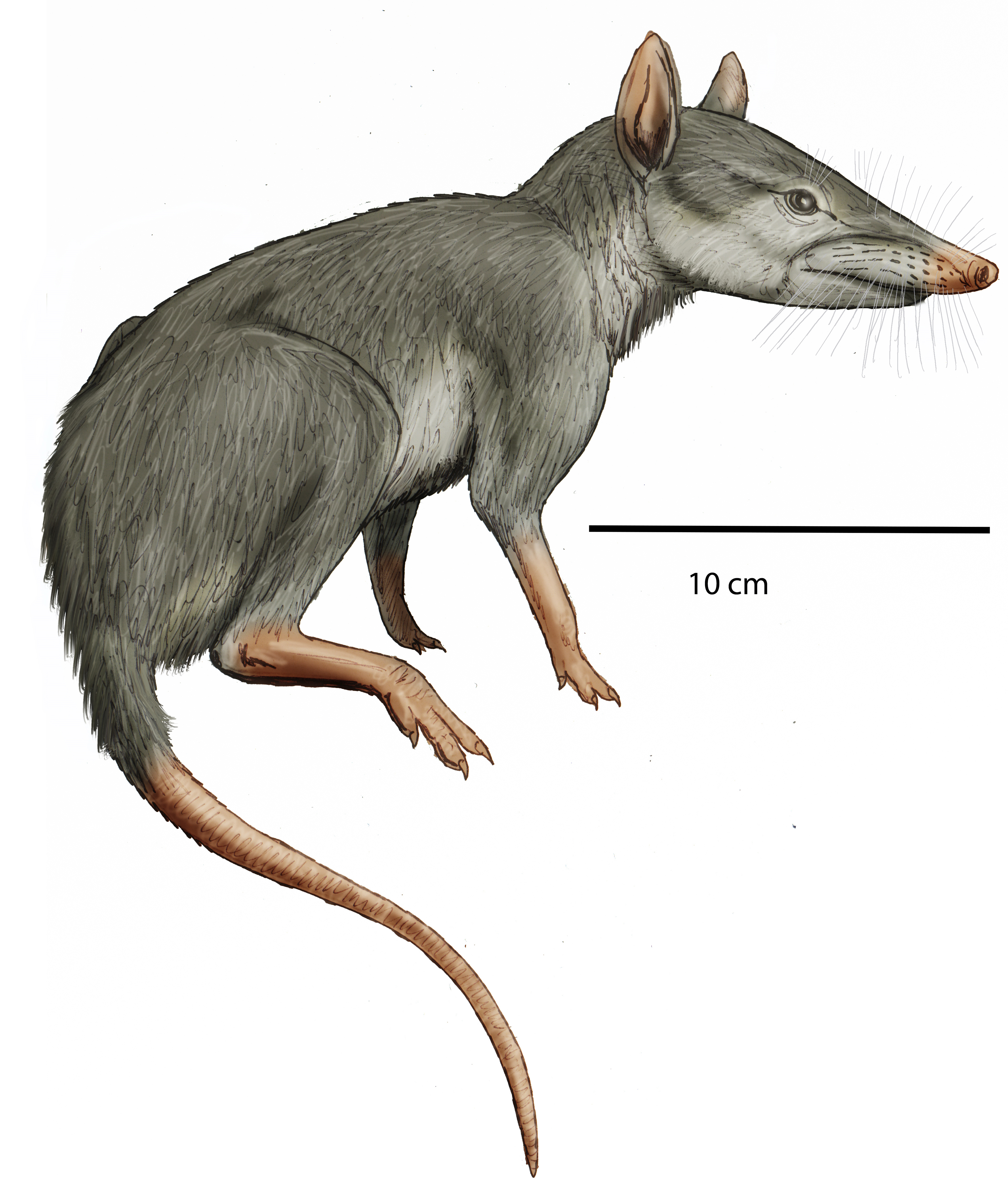
Life restoration

Leptictis is an extinct genus of leptictid non-placental eutherian mammal known from the Late Eocene to Early Oligocene of North America. The type species, L. haydeni, was named in 1868 by Joseph Leidy in honour of Ferdinand Vandeveer Hayden. L. dakotensis was also named by Leidy in 1868, but he originally named it as a separate genus, Ictops, which is now seen as the same animal as Lepticitis. Since then, six other species have been named.

== Description ==
Leptictis had a high encephalisation quotient, comparable to that of early prosimian primates. The ramus inferior of the stapedial artery was absent in both L. haydeni and L. dakotensis. The hindlimbs of Leptictis are proportionally elongated compared to their forelimbs in a manner similar to elephant shrews, though to a lesser degree than Leptictidium, and it is suggested that they were capable of rapid bursts of quadrupedal locomotion, unlike the bipedal locomotion suggested for Leptictidium. The forelimbs were likely used for digging.
