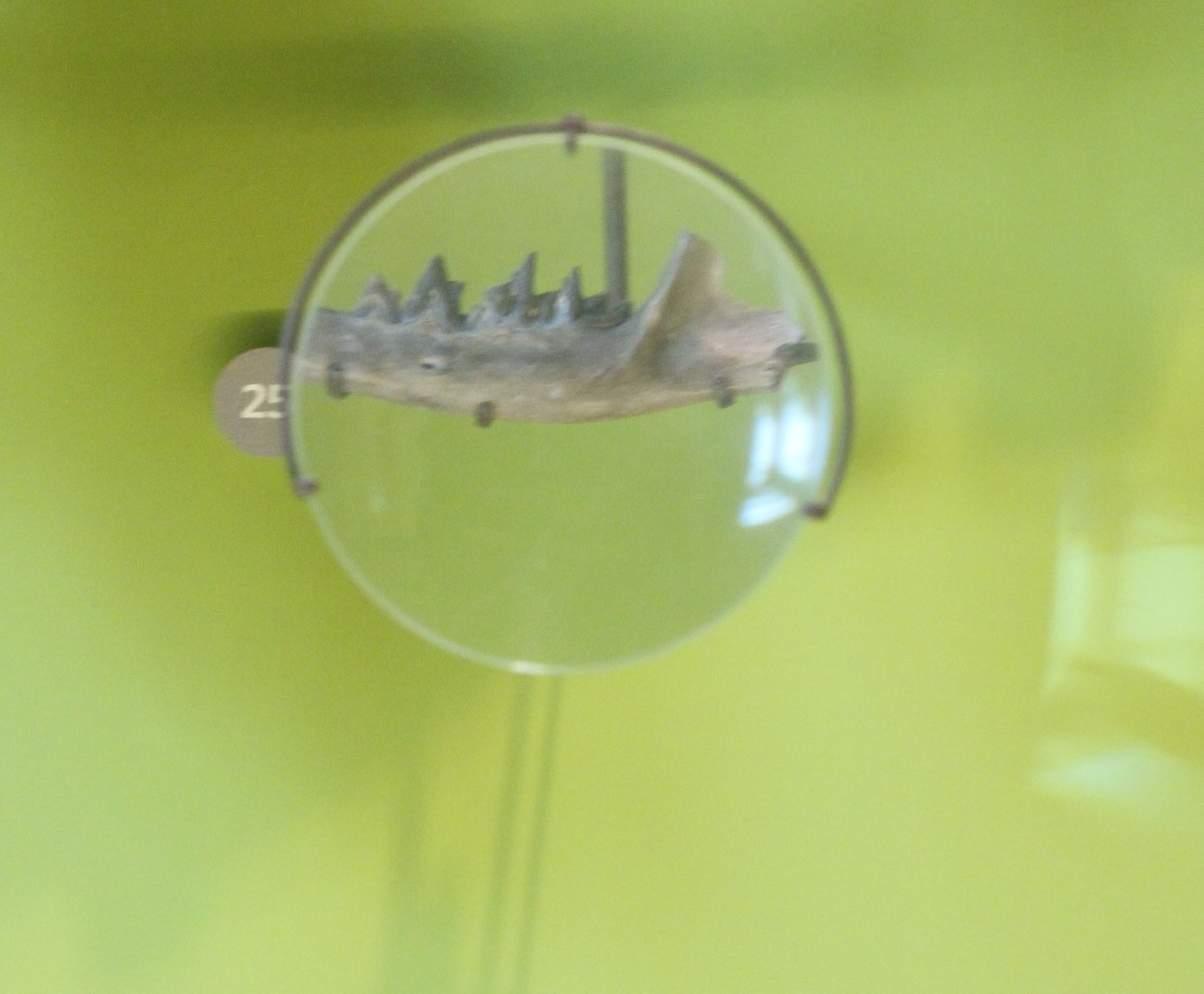
- Lower jaw (LACM 152546) of C. stirtoni, Natural History Museum of Los Angeles County

Scientific classification
- Kingdom: Animalia
- Phylum: Chordata
- Class: Mammalia
- Order: †Cimolesta
- Family: †Cimolestidae
- Genus: †Cimolestes; Marsh, 1889

Type species
- †Cimolestes incisus Marsh, 1889

Synonyms
- Nyssodon Simpson, 1927

= Cimolestes =

Cimolestes Temporal range: Late Campanian-Latest Thanetian ~75–56 Ma

Extinct genus of mammals

Cimolestes (from Ancient Greek Κιμο λέστες, 'chalk robber') is a genus of early eutherians with a full complement of teeth adapted for eating insects and other small animals. Paleontologists have disagreed on its relationship to other mammals, in part because quite different animals were assigned to the genus, making Cimolestes a grade taxon of animals with similar features rather than a genus of closely related ones. Fossils have been found in North America, South America, Europe and Africa. Cimolestes first appeared during the Late Cretaceous of North America. According to some paleontologists, Cimolestes died out at the start of the Paleocene, while others report the genus from the early Eocene.

Most species have been described from teeth and isolated fragments. One complete articulated skeleton provisionally assigned to Cimolestes has been found. It shows a small, agile, tree-dwelling predator with long toes for grasping branches and a prehensile tail at least twice the length of its body. It has the largest number of tail vertebrae known in any mammal.

== Classification ==
The genus was once considered to be that of a marsupial; later, it was reclassified with the placental mammals, as ancestors of the Carnivora and the extinct Creodonta. Recent researchers have agreed the species assigned to Cimolestes are primitive eutherian mammals, members of a cimolestid clade (an order or family named after the genus), part of the larger clade Didelphodonta (a superorder or order, not to be confused with the marsupial clade Didelphimorphia). Didelphodonts have been placed within the Ferae, as a sister group to Carnivora. However, consensus is emerging that modern placental mammals evolved later than previously thought, that other types of mammals had long, diversified, and successful histories, and that Cimolestes and many related genera are stem eutherians, more closely related to placentals than to marsupials but outside of placental mammals proper, and not closely related to any living animal.

Cimolestes in particular follows as the direct outgroup to Taeniodonta, indicating that the latter evolved from forms similar to it.

== Reassigned species ==
In order to make the genus reflect an actual group of most closely related species, three nominal species of Cimolestes, C. magnus, C. cerberoides, and C. propalaeoryctes, have been reassigned to their own genera, Altacreodus, Ambilestes, and Scollardius, respectively. Cimolestes incisus (Marsh) and Cimolestes stirtoni (Clemens) remain within the genus.

== Fossil distribution ==
Fossils of Cimolestes have been found in:

Cretaceous

- Canada
  - Foremost, Oldman and St. Mary River Formations, Alberta
  - Ravenscrag and Frenchman Formations, Saskatchewan
- United States
  - Hell Creek and Judith River Formations, Montana
  - Kirtland Formation, New Mexico
  - Lance Formation, Wyoming

Paleocene

- Hainin Formation, Belgium
- Santa Lucía Formation (Tiupampan), Bolivia
- Ravenscrag and Frenchman Formations, Saskatchewan, Canada
- Jbel Guersif Formation, Morocco
- United States (Puercan)
  - Bear and Hell Creek Formations, Montana
  - Ferris Formation, Wyoming

Eocene

- Fossil Butte Member, Green River Formation, Wyoming, United States

== In popular culture ==
Cimolestes is featured as an edible creature in the game Tasty Planet: Back for Seconds.
