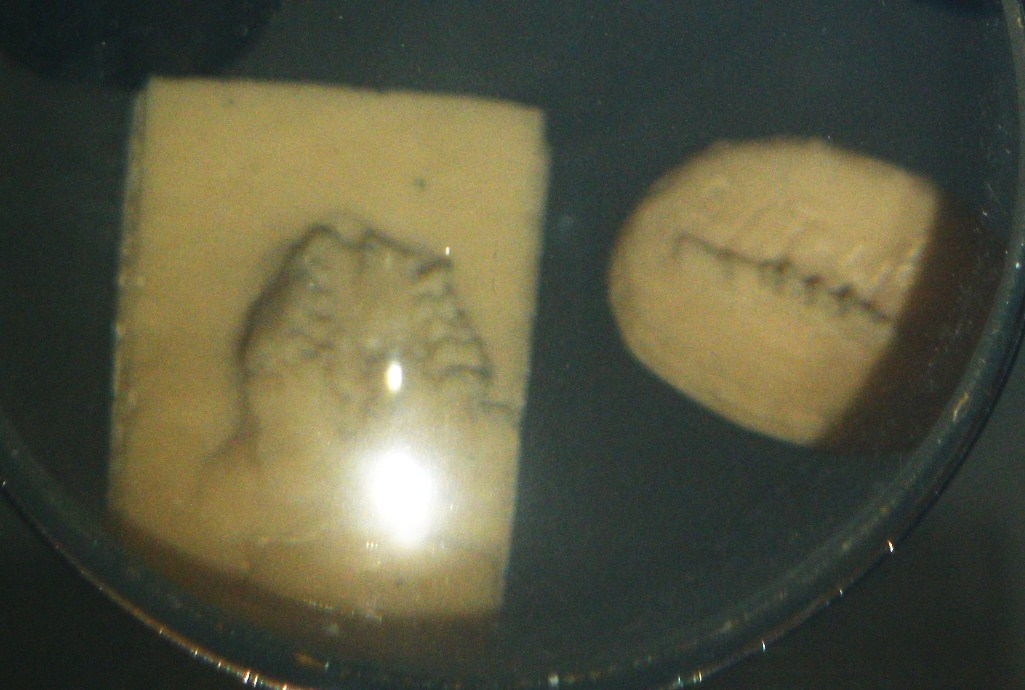
- Kennalestes gobiensis fossils

Scientific classification
- Kingdom: Animalia
- Phylum: Chordata
- Class: Mammalia
- Order: †Asioryctitheria
- Family: †Kennalestidae; Kielan-Jaworowska, 1981
- Genus: †Kennalestes; Kielan-Jaworowska, 1968

Type species
- †Kennalestes gobiensis Kielan-Jaworowska, 1968

= Kennalestes =

Kennalestes Temporal range: Late Cretaceous, 75 Ma

Extinct genus of mammals

Kennalestes is an extinct genus of insectivorous mammal resembling a shrew that was described in 1968. The type species is Kennalestes gobiensis and it was a common mammal in Mongolia during the Cretaceous period, found in both the Bayan Mandahu Formation and Djadochta Formation. It was found in Mongolia during the Campanian, so it may have fallen victim to such predators as Velociraptor, Oviraptor and Archaeornithoides.
