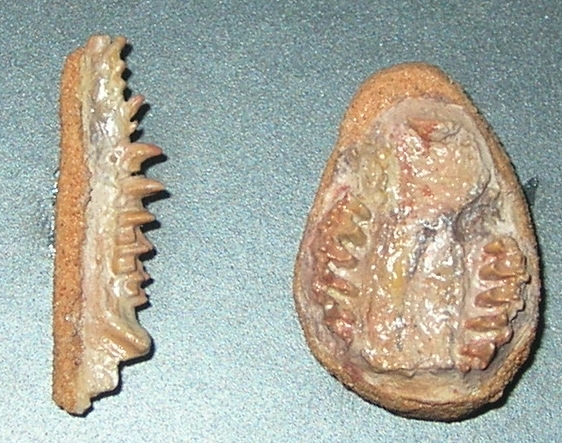
- Zalambdalestes lechei skull and lower jaw, Museum of Evolution Warsaw

Scientific classification
- Kingdom: Animalia
- Phylum: Chordata
- Class: Mammalia
- Family: †Zalambdalestidae
- Genus: †Zalambdalestes; Gregory & Simpson, 1926

Species
- Z. lechei Gregory & Simpson, 1926 (type)

= Zalambdalestes =

Zalambdalestes Temporal range: Late Cretaceous

Genus of shrew-like mammal from the Upper Cretaceous period

Zalambdalestes (meaning much-like-lambda robber) is an extinct genus of eutherian mammal known from the Upper Cretaceous in Mongolia.

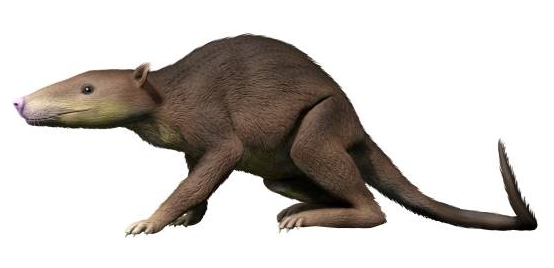
Life restoration of Z. lechei

== Description ==
Zalambdalestes was a hopping animal with a long snout, long teeth, a small brain and large eyes. It was about 20 centimetres (7.9 in) long, with a head only 5 centimetres (2 in) long. It had strong front paws and even stronger rear ones, sharing specializations to saltation similar to those of modern rabbits. It was most likely not a placental due to the presence of an epipubic bone, It had a unique axis that allowed for rapid movements, and in life it might have had spines or bristly fur.

== Biology ==
Its diet was probably composed mainly of insects that it hunted in the forest undergrowth using its sharp, interlocking teeth. A well-preserved series of cervical vertebrae, including the axis, but not the atlas, seem to suggest vermivory. Unlike modern placental mammals, Zalambdalestes had an epipubic bone, meaning it was probably restricted reproductively in the same way as modern monotremes and marsupials, though a study on multituberculate reproduction suggests early eutherians could give birth to well-developed young. Its unique axis allowed for rapid movements to catch prey.

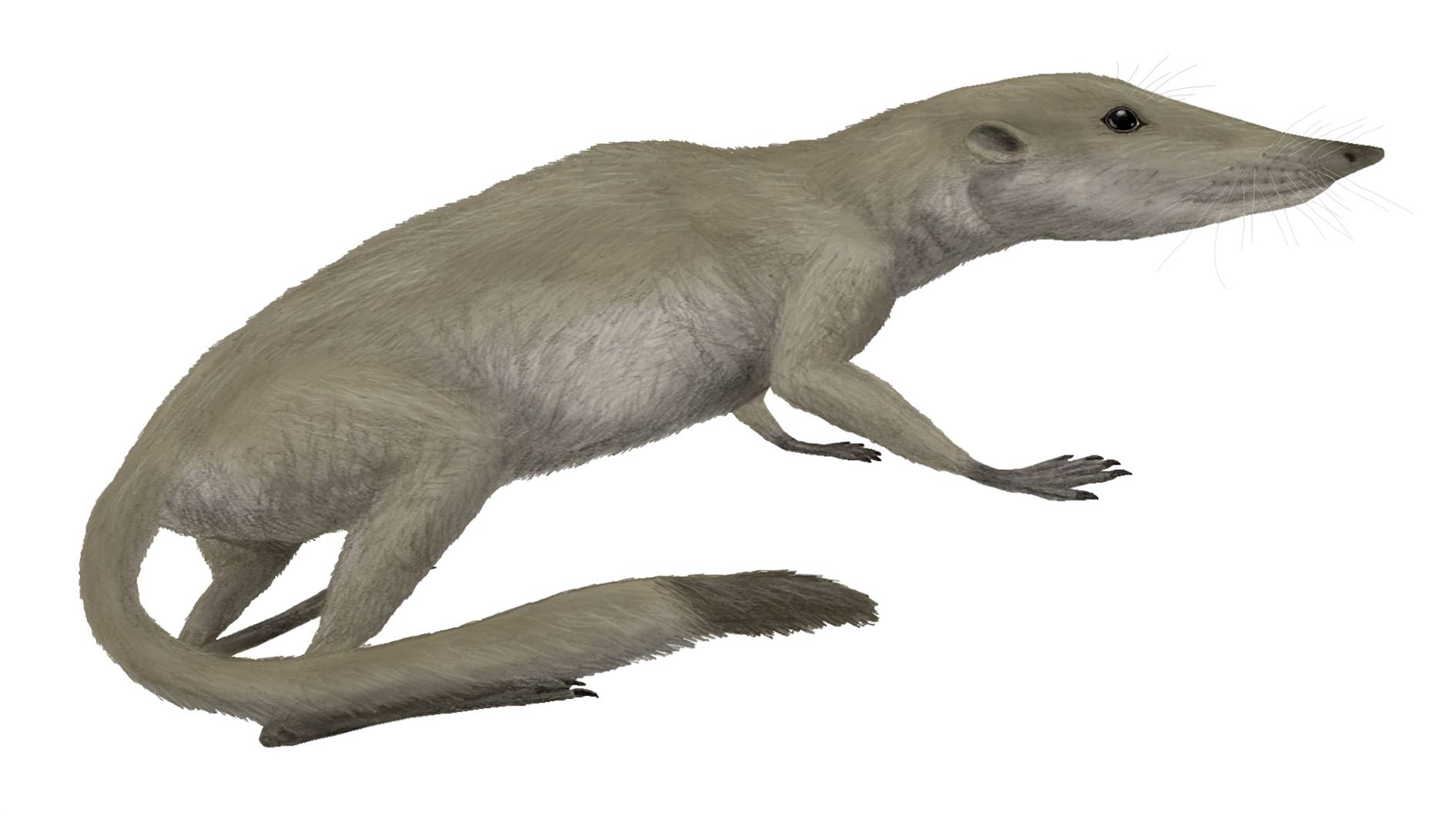
Life reconstruction of Z. lechei
