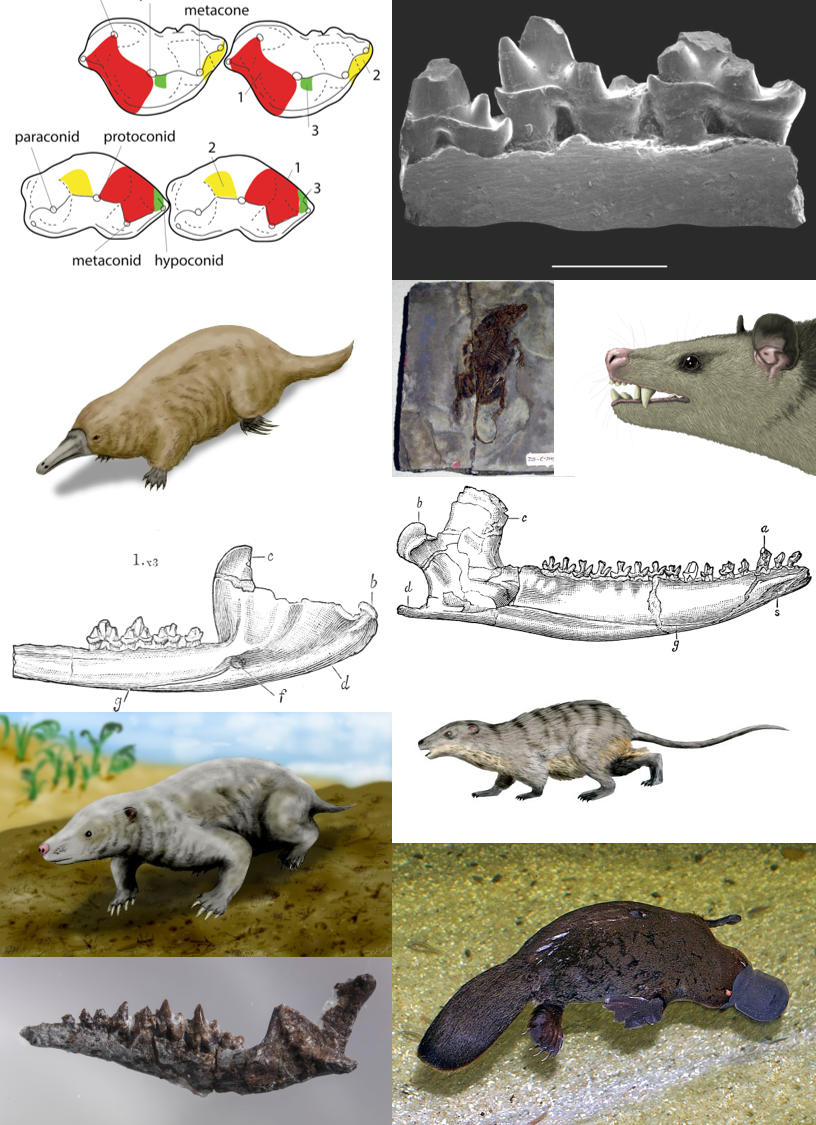
- Diversity of holotheres

Scientific classification
- Kingdom: Animalia
- Phylum: Chordata
- Class: Mammalia
- Clade: Theriiformes
- Clade: Holotheria; Wible et al., 1995

Subgroups
- †Kuehneotheriidae; †Eutriconodonta (paraphyletic)?; Crown group Mammalia; Pan-Monotremata T. B. Rowe, 2020; †Docodonta?; †Shuotheriidae?; Australosphenida; †Henosferidae?; †Ausktribosphenida?; Monotremata; Theriimorpha/Pan-Theria; †Eutriconodonta (paraphyletic)?; †Gobiconodonta?; †Tinodontidae; Trechnotheria

= Holotheria =

Holotheres Temporal range: Late Triassic - Holocene, 220–0 Ma

Extinct clade of mammals

Holotheria is a diverse group of mammals that are descendants of the last common ancestor of Kuehneotherium (now known to be a non-mammalian cynodont) and Theria (the group that includes marsupials and placental mammals). The group is characterized by the beginning of the triangulation of a typical triconodont dentition in morganucodonts, towards a symmetrodonta. This triangulation occurs convergently in Docodontiformes although Shuotheriidae was formerly considered sister to Australosphenida. There are studies that place Docodonta as sister to Monotremata, which would make Docodontiformes fall within Pan-Monotremata instead of being a clade outside Holotheria.

Holotheria fell into disuse and was widely considered invalid by the early 2000s, but Mao et al. in 2024 revived the clade due to them finding Allotheria (the group containing multituberculates and their relatives) outside crown group of mammals.

== Classification ==
According to McKenna/Bell (1997):

- Class Mammalia
  - Subclass Theriiformes
    - Infraclass Holotheria
      - Genus †Chronoperates?
      - Superlegion †Kuehneotheria
        - Genus †Woutersia
        - Family †Kuehneotheriidae
      - Superlegion Trechnotheria
        - Legion †Symmetrodonta*
          - Genus †Casamiquelia?
          - Genus †Thereuodon?
          - Genus †Atlasodon?
          - Genus †Eurylambda?
          - Genus †Peralestes?
          - Genus †Shuotherium?
          - Order †Amphidontoidea
            - Family †Amphidontidae
          - Order †Spalacotherioidea
            - Genus †Gobiotheriodon?
            - Genus †Maotherium
            - Genus †Zhangheotherium
            - Family †Tinodontidae
            - Family †Barbereniidae?
              - Genus †Guirogatherium?
              - Genus †Barberenia?
            - Family †Spalacotheriidae
              - Genus †Microderson
              - Genus †Shalbaatar
              - Genus †Spalacotherium
              - Subfamily †Spalacolestinae
                - Genus †Symmetrolestes
                - Genus †Akidolestes
                - Genus †Heishanlestes
                - Genus †Spalacotheroides
                - Genus †Spalacotheridium
                - Genus †Spalacolestes
                - Genus †Symmetrodontoides
        - Legion Cladotheria
          - Genus †Butlerigale?
          - Family †Ausktribosphenidae?
          - Sublegion †Dryolestoidea
            - Order †Dryolestida
            - Order †Amphitheriida
          - Sublegion Zatheria
            - Infralegion †Peramura
            - Infralegion Tribosphenida
              - Genus †Ambondro?
              - Genus †Hypomylos?
              - Genus †Montanalestes?
              - Genus †Tribactonodon?
              - Supercohort †Aegialodontia
                - Family †Aegialodontidae
                  - Genus †Aegialodon
                  - Genus †Kielantherium
              - Supercohort Theria
                - Order †Deltatheroida
                - Order †Asiadelphia
                - Cohort Marsupialia
                  - Magnorder Australidelphia
                  - Superorder Microbiotheria
                  - Superorder Eometatheria
                      - Order †Yalkaparidontia
                      - Order Notoryctemorphia
                    - Grandorder Dasyuromorphia
                    - Grandorder Syndactyli
                      - Order Peramelia
                      - Order Diprotodontia
                  - Magnorder Ameridelphia
                - Cohort Placentalia
                      - Order †Bibymalagasia
                  - Magnorder Xenarthra
                  - Magnorder Epitheria

According to Wang, Clemens, Hu & Li, 1998

- Class Mammalia
  - Subclass Theriiformes
    - Infraclass Holotheria
      - Genus †Chronoperates?
      - Superlegion †Kuehneotheria
      - Superlegion Trechnotheria
        - Family †Amphidontidae
        - Superfamily †Spalacotheroidea
        - Legion Symmetrodonta
          - Genus †Asfaltomylos?
          - Genus †Atlasodon?
          - Family †Ausktribosphenidae?
          - Genus †Casamiquelia?
          - Genus †Thereuodon?
          - Genus †Eurylambda?
          - Genus †Shuotherium
        - Legion Cladotheria
          - Genus †Butlerigale?
          - Sublegion †Dryolestoidea
            - Order †Dryolestida
            - Order †Amphitheriida
            - Genus †Amphitherium
          - Sublegion Zatheria
            - Genus †Arguitherium?
            - Genus †Arguimus?
            - Genus †Nanolestes?
            - Genus †Vincelestes?
            - Infralegion †Peramura
            - Infralegion Tribosphenida

- Mammaliamorpha
  - †Tritylodontidae
  - Mammaliaformes
    - †Sinoconodon
    - - †Morganucodonta
      - - †Docodonta+Shuotheriidae
        - †Hadrocodium
        - - †Allotheria
            - †Haramiyavia
            - - †Thomasia
              - - †Euharamiyida
                - †Multituberculata (including Gondwanatheria)
          - Mammalia (crown group)
            - Australosphenida (including Monotremata)
            - - †Eutriconodonta (partim)
              - - †Gobiconodontidae
                - - †Spalacotheriidae and other "symmetrodonts"
                  - Cladotheria
                    - †Dryolestida
                    - Theria
