= Paleobiota of the Yixian Formation =

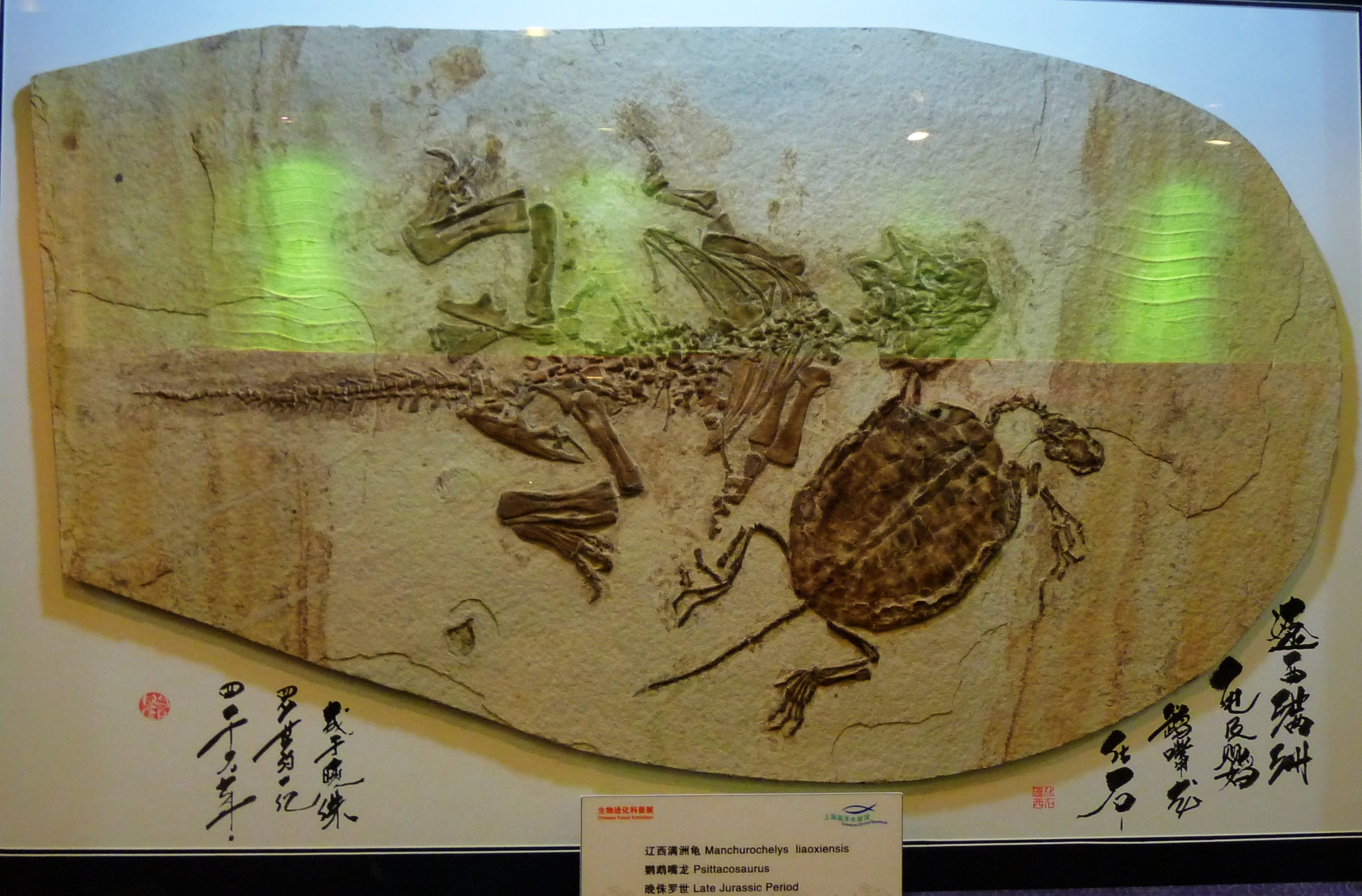
Ordosemys liaoxiensis and Psittacosaurus preserved together

The Yixian Formation (simplified Chinese: 义县组; traditional Chinese: 義縣組; pinyin: Yìxiàn zǔ) is a geological formation in Jinzhou, Liaoning, People's Republic of China, that spans about 1.6 million years during the early Cretaceous period (Barremian-Aptian stage). It is known for its diverse fossils, listed below. These include dinosaurs, pterosaurs, mammals, amphibians, fish, and various invertebrates.

The Yixian Formation is divided into the following subunits: (ages from Zhong et al., 2021 unless otherwise noted)

- Upper Yixian (124.1 Ma) ("Jingangshan Bed") ("Dawangzhangzi Bed")
- Upper Lava Unit
- Jianshangou Unit (125.46 Ma)
- Lower Lava Unit
- Lujiatun Unit (125.76–125.68 Ma)

== Sauropods ==
Genus	Species	County	Member	Material	Notes	Images
Dongbeititan	D. dongi	Beipiao	Jianshangou Bed	Partial postcrania	A basal titanosauriform	
cf. Euhelopus	cf. E. sp.		Lujiatun Bed	Isolated teeth	A basal titanosauriform	
Liaoningotitan	L. sinensis			Nearly complete skeleton	A basal titanosauriform	
Ruixinia	R. zhangi	Beipiao		A partial articulated skeleton	A somphospondylan titanosauriform	
Sauropoda spp.			Lujiatun & Jianshangou Beds	Isolated vertebrae and teeth	One or more species of sauropods, possibly titanosaurs, have been recovered from the Yixian Formation, though most remain undescribed	

== Ornithischians ==
The dinosaurs listed below were compiled in a survey by Xu and Norell in 2006, unless otherwise noted.

=== Ankylosaurs ===
Genus	Species	County	Member	Material	Notes	Images
Liaoningosaurus	L. paradoxus	Yixian	Dawangzhangzi Bed	"Partial skull [and] skeleton."	A small ankylosaur	

=== Ceratopsians ===
Genus	Species	County	Member	Material	Notes	Images
Liaoceratops	L. yanzigouensis	Beipiao	Lujiatun Bed	"[Two] nearly complete skulls, juvenile to adult."	A ceratopsian	
Psittacosaurus	P. lujiatunensis	Beipiao	Lujiatun & Jianshangou Beds	Thousands of specimens in the Lujiatun Bed, somewhat less common in the Jianshangou Bed	A ceratopsian	

=== Ornithopods ===
Genus	Species	County	Member	Material	Notes	Images
Bolong	B. yixianensis		Jianshangou Bed	A nearly complete skeleton.	An iguanodontian ornithopod	
Changmiania	C. liaoningensis		Lujiatun Bed	Two nearly complete skeletons	A basal ornithopod that may have dug burrows	
Haolong	H. dongi	Jianchang	Jianshangou Unit	Nearly complete skeleton with preserved integument	A hadrosauroid ornithopod	
Jeholosaurus	J. shangyuanensis	Beipiao	Lujiatun Bed	"Skull with associated vertebrae and hindlimb, skull with cervical vertebrae."	An ornithopod	
Jinzhousaurus	J. yangi	Yixian	Dawangzhangzi Bed	"Nearly complete skull and skeleton."	An ornithopod	

== Theropods ==
The dinosaurs listed below were compiled in a survey by Xu and Norell in 2006, unless otherwise noted.

=== Avialans ===
Color key: Taxon / Reclassified taxon / Taxon falsely reported as present / Dubious taxon or junior synonym / Ichnotaxon / Ootaxon / Morphotaxon	Notes; Uncertain or tentative taxa are in small text; ~~crossed out~~ taxa are discredited.

Genus	Species	County	Member	Material	Notes	Images
Abitusavis	A. lii	Ningcheng		"Nearly complete skeleton."		
Archaeorhynchus	A. spathula		Dawangzhangzi Bed		An early, advanced short-tailed bird (ornithuran)	
Changchengornis	C. hengdaoziensis		Jianshangou Bed	"Nearly complete skeleton."	A confuciusornithid	
Confuciusornis	C. chuonzhous				Junior synonym of Confuciusornis sanctus	
Confuciusornis	C. dui		Jianshangou Bed	"[Two] skeletons."		
Confuciusornis	C. feducciai		Jianshangou Bed			
Confuciusornis	C. sanctus		Jianshangou and Dawangzhangzi Beds	"Hundreds of complete skeletons."	A primitive short-tailed bird (pygostylian), also present in the Jiufotang Formation	
Confuciusornis	C. suniae				Junior synonym of Confuciusornis sanctus	
Dalingheornis	D. liweii		Dawangzhangzi Bed		An Enantiornithine	
Eoenantiornis	E. buhleri		Jianshangou Bed	"Nearly complete skeleton."	An entantiornithine	
Eogranivora	E. edentulata		Dawangzhangzi Bed	"Nearly complete skeleton with skull"	An ornithuromorph	
Iteravis	I. huchzermeyeri				An ornithuromorph; previously regarded as Yixian, horizon reassigned to the Jiufotang Formation by Ju et al., 2021	
Jinzhouornis	J. yixianensis		Jianshangou Bed		A pygostylian, a junior synonym of Confuciusornis sanctus	
Jinzhouornis	J. zhangjiyingia		Jianshangou Bed		Junior synonym of C. sanctus	
Jixiangornis	J. orientalis		Jianshangou Bed		A basal avialan, also present in the Jiufotang Formation	
Hongshanornis	H. longicresta		Jianshangou and Dawangzhangzi Beds	Four specimens	An ornithuromorph	
Jibeinia	J. luahera				Previously regarded as Yixian, horizon reassigned to the Huajiying Formation by Jin et al., 2008.	
Liaoningornis	L. longidigitris		Lujiatun Bed	"Partial skeleton."	An enantiornithine.	
Liaoxiornis	L. delicatus		Dawangzhangzi Bed		Considered a nomen dubium because the name is based on remains of a hatchling entantiornithine and cannot be confidently matched with the adult form.	
Lingyuanornis	L. parvus		Dawangzhangzi Bed		Junior objective synonym of Liaoxiornis delicatus, a nomen dubium.	
Longicrusavis	L. houi		Dawangzhangzi Bed		An ornithuromorph	
Longirostravis	L. hani		bed unknown		An enantiornithine	
Protopteryx	P. fengningensis				Previously regarded as Yixian, horizon reassigned to the Huajiying Formation by Jin et al., 2008.	
Mirusavis	M. parvus			Partial skeleton.	An immature female enantiornithine preserved with medullary bone tissue.	
Sapeornis	S. chaoyangensis			Nearly complete skeleton.	A subadult omnivoropterygid with preserved feathers.	
Shanweiniao	S. cooperorum		Dawangzhangzi Bed		An enantiornithine.	
Vescornis	V. hebeiensis				Previously regarded as Yixian, horizon reassigned to the Huajiying Formation by Jin et al., 2008.	
Yixianosaurus	Y. longimanus		Dawangzhangzi Bed		An anchiornithid	
Zhongornis	Z. haoae		Dawangzhangzi Bed		A primitive avialan with a short but non-pygostylian tail	

=== Compsognathids ===
Color key: Taxon / Reclassified taxon / Taxon falsely reported as present / Dubious taxon or junior synonym / Ichnotaxon / Ootaxon / Morphotaxon	Notes; Uncertain or tentative taxa are in small text; ~~crossed out~~ taxa are discredited.

Genus	Species	County	Member	Material	Notes	Images
Huadanosaurus	H. sinensis		Dawangzhangzi Bed	A nearly complete specimen missing the feet and end of the tail	A compsognathid	
Huaxiagnathus	H. orientalis	Beipiao	Jianshangou Bed		A compsognathid	
Sinocalliopteryx	S. gigas	Beipiao	Jianshangou Bed		A large compsognathid	
Sinosauropteryx	S. lingyuanensis		Dawangzhangzi Bed	A nearly complete specimen	A compsognathid	
Sinosauropteryx	S. prima	Beipiao & Lingyuan	Jianshangou & Dawangzhangzi Beds	Four nearly complete specimens	A compsognathid. The first non-avian dinosaur found with feather impressions.	
Sinosauropteryx	S.? sp.	Beipiao	Jianshangou Bed	One specimen (GMV 2124) with partial skull, postcrania, and preserved feathers	An unnamed coelurosaur originally described as a specimen of Sinosauropteryx, later suggested to be a new genus and species, probably a tyrannosauroid.	

=== Dromaeosaurs ===
Genus	Species	County	Member	Material	Notes	Images
Changyuraptor	C. yangi	Jianchang		A complete articulated specimen with extensive feathering.	A dromaeosaurid	
Graciliraptor	G. lujiatunensis	Beipiao	Lujiatun Bed	An incomplete specimen.	A dromaeosaurid	
Sinornithosaurus	S. haoiana	Yixian	Dawangzhangzi Bed		Might be a junior synonym of Sinornithosaurus millenii.	
Sinornithosaurus	S. millenii	Beipiao	Jianshangou Bed	Three specimens with skulls and postcrania, two with preserved feathers. Feathered integument is also preserved.	A dromaeosaurid, the first ever found with feather impressions.	
Tianyuraptor	T. ostromi	Lingyuan	Dawangzhangzi Bed		A dromaeosaurid	
Zhenyuanlong	Z. suni	Jianchang		One nearly complete skeleton with preserved feathers, including long tail feathers and large wing feathers.	A dromaeosaurid	
Zhongjianosaurus	Z. yangi	Lingyuan		A partial skeleton includes an arm, legs, vertebrae, ribs, and most of the tail.	A microraptorian dromaeosaurid with very long legs.	
Unnamed dromaeosaurid	Specimen NGMC 91	Lingyuan	Dawangzhangzi Bed	Complete specimen with feather imprints	A juvenile dromaeosaurid that may be a specimen of Sinornithosaurus millenii. Informally nicknamed "Dave".	

=== Ornithomimosaurs ===
Color key: Taxon / Reclassified taxon / Taxon falsely reported as present / Dubious taxon or junior synonym / Ichnotaxon / Ootaxon / Morphotaxon	Notes; Uncertain or tentative taxa are in small text; ~~crossed out~~ taxa are discredited.

Genus	Species	County	Member	Material	Notes	Images
Hexing	H. qingyi	Beipiao	Lujiatun		A primitive ornithomimosaur	
Shenzhousaurus	S. orientalis	Beipiao	Lujiatun Bed	"Articulated skull and incomplete skeleton."	A primitive ornithomimosaur	Shenzhousaurus

=== Oviraptorosaurs ===
Color key: Taxon / Reclassified taxon / Taxon falsely reported as present / Dubious taxon or junior synonym / Ichnotaxon / Ootaxon / Morphotaxon	Notes; Uncertain or tentative taxa are in small text; ~~crossed out~~ taxa are discredited.

Genus	Species	County	Member	Material	Notes	Images
Caudipteryx	C. dongi	Beipiao	Jianshangou Bed	One partial postcranium with feather imprints	An oviraptorosaur	
Caudipteryx	C. zoui	Beipiao	Jianshangou Bed	Common, only over a small region	An oviraptorosaur	
Caudipteryx	C. sp.				An oviraptorosaur	
Incisivosaurus	I. gauthieri	Beipiao	Lujiatun Bed	A skull and partial cervical	An oviraptorosaur	
Ningyuansaurus	N. wangi			Complete skeleton with feather impressions.	An oviraptorosaur	
Protarchaeopteryx	P. robusta	Beipiao	Jianshangou Bed	"Nearly complete skull and skeleton, at least [two] individuals."	A possible relative of Incisivosaurus	
Similicaudipteryx	S. yixianensis			Two specimens	An oviraptorosaur, also present in the Jiufotang Formation	
Xingtianosaurus	X. ganqi	Liaoning	Dakangpu Bed	One nearly complete specimen (IVPP V13390), minus the head	An oviraptorosaur	

=== Therizinosaurs ===
Color key: Taxon / Reclassified taxon / Taxon falsely reported as present / Dubious taxon or junior synonym / Ichnotaxon / Ootaxon / Morphotaxon	Notes; Uncertain or tentative taxa are in small text; ~~crossed out~~ taxa are discredited.

Genus	Species	County	Member	Material	Notes	Images	Images
Beipiaosaurus	B. inexpectus	Beipiao	Jianshangou Bed	Incomplete skeleton with integument	A therizinosaur		
Kayrasaurus	K. changliensis	Beipiao		Nearly complete skeleton including the skull; missing the hindlimbs	A therizinosaur		
Jianchangosaurus	J. yixianensis	Jianchang		A nearly complete juvenile specimen with feather impressions	A therizinosaur		

=== Troodontids ===
Genus	Species	County	Member	Material	Notes	Images
Daliansaurus	D. liaoningensis	Beipiao	Lujiatun Bed	A very complete specimen.	A troodontid	
Jianianhualong	J. tengi	Beipiao	Dawangzhangzi Bed	A very complete specimen with feather impressions.	A troodontid	
Liaoningvenator	L. curriei	Beipiao		A very complete specimen.	A troodontid	
Mei	M. long	Beipiao	Lujiatun Bed		A small troodontid fossilized in a sleeping position	
Sinovenator	S. changii	Beipiao	Lujiatun Bed	Three specimens with partial skulls and postcrania. Hundreds of additional specimens known but undescribed.	A troodontid	
Sinusonasus	S. magnodens	Beipiao	Lujiatun Bed		A troodontid	
Undescribed deinonychosaur/possible troodontid			Dawangzhangzi Bed	One specimen with feather imprints	A possible troodontid.	
Undescribed troodontid	Specimen CAGS-IG01-004		Lujiatun Bed	Skull and partial skeleton	A troodontid similar to Mei.	

=== Tyrannosaurs and other theropods ===
Color key: Taxon / Reclassified taxon / Taxon falsely reported as present / Dubious taxon or junior synonym / Ichnotaxon / Ootaxon / Morphotaxon	Notes; Uncertain or tentative taxa are in small text; ~~crossed out~~ taxa are discredited.

Genus	Species	County	Member	Material	Notes	Images
Dilong	D. paradoxus	Beipiao	Lujiatun & Jianshangou Bed	Rare	A tyrannosauroid	
Grallator			lower Jianshangou Bed		Footprints belonging to the Grallator form taxon, belonging to a small theropod. Of known Yixian theropods, the footprints most closely match Caudipteryx.	
Raptorex	R. kriegsteini				A tyrannosaurid, probably from higher Mongolian strata.	
Scansoriopteryx	S. heilmanni				Initially reported from the Dawangzhangzi Bed, probably from the Daohugou Beds instead.	
Yutyrannus	Y. huali		Unknown	Three nearly complete skeletons of various ages	A large tyrannosauroid	
Unnamed theropod	Not yet described	Yixian	Lujiatun Bed	Partial post-cranial skeleton	A possible allosauroid	

== Pterosaurs ==
The pterosaurs listed below were compiled in a survey by Wang and Zhou in 2006, unless otherwise noted.

Genus	Species	County	Member	Material	Notes	Images
Beipiaopterus	B. chenianus		Jianshangou Bed		A ctenochasmatid	
Boreopterus	B. cuiae		Jianshangou Bed		A boreopterid	
Cathayopterus	C. grabaui		Dawangzhangzi Bed		A ctenochasmatid	
Dendrorhynchoides	D. curvidentatus				An anurognathid	
Elanodactylus	E. prolatus		Jianshangou Bed		A ctenochasmatid	
Eopteranodon	E. lii	Beipiao			A tapejarid	
Eopteranodon	E. yixianensis	Beipiao	Jianshangou Bed		A tapejarid	
Eosipterus	E. yangi		Jianshangou Bed		A ctenochasmatid	
Feilongus	F. youngi	Beipiao	Jianshangou Bed		A ctenochasmatid	
Gegepterus	G. changae		Jianshangou Bed		A ctenochasmatid	
Gladocephaloideus	G. jingangshanensis		Jianshangou Bed		A ctenochasmatid	
Haopterus	H. gracilis		Jianshangou Bed		A mimodactylid	
Luchibang	L. xingzhe			One partial skull	An istiodactylid	
Moganopterus	M. zhuiana		Lujiatun bed?		A ctenochasmatid	
Ningchengopterus	N. liuae		Jianshangou or Dawangzhangzi bed		A pterodactyloid	
Nurhachius	N. sp.		Jingangshan Member	An incomplete specimen	An istiodactylid	
Pterofiltrus	P. qiui		Jianshangou Bed		A ctenochasmatid	
Yixianopterus	Y. jingangshanensis				An istiodactyliform	
Zhenyuanopterus	Z. longirostris		Jianshangou Bed		A boreopteridm may be adult form of Boreopterus.	

== Misc. reptiles ==
=== Choristoderans ===
Color key: Taxon / Reclassified taxon / Taxon falsely reported as present / Dubious taxon or junior synonym / Ichnotaxon / Ootaxon / Morphotaxon	Notes; Uncertain or tentative taxa are in small text; ~~crossed out~~ taxa are discredited.

Genus	Species	County	Member	Material	Notes	Images
Hyphalosaurus	H. lingyuanensis		Dawangzhangzi Bed			
Hyphalosaurus	H. baitaigouensis		Jingangshan Bed	Thousands of specimens		
Monjurosuchus	M. splendens		Dawangzhangzi Bed			
Sinohydrosaurus	S. lingyuanensis		Dawangzhangzi Bed		Junior synonym of Hyphalosaurus lingyuanensis	

=== Lizards ===
Genus	Species	County	Member	Material	Notes	Images
Dalinghosaurus	D. longidigitus		Jianshangou Bed		A lizard related to shinisaurs	
Liushusaurus	L. acanthocaudata		Jianshangou or Dawangzhangzi bed		A lizard related to geckos and skinks	
Xianglong	X. zhaoi		Jianshangou Bed		A gliding lizard related to chameleons and dragon lizards	
Yabeinosaurus	Y. tenuis		Dawangzhangzi & Jingangshan Beds		A lizard related to geckos and skinks	

=== Turtles ===
Color key: Taxon / Reclassified taxon / Taxon falsely reported as present / Dubious taxon or junior synonym / Ichnotaxon / Ootaxon / Morphotaxon	Notes; Uncertain or tentative taxa are in small text; ~~crossed out~~ taxa are discredited.

Genus	Species	County	Member	Material	Notes	Images
Manchurochelys	M. liaoxiensis		Jianshangou Bed		Reclassified as Ordosemys liaoxiensis	
Manchurochelys	M. manchoukuoensis		Jingangshan Bed			
Ordosemys	O. liaoxiensis		Jianshangou Bed			

== Mammals ==
Color key: Taxon / Reclassified taxon / Taxon falsely reported as present / Dubious taxon or junior synonym / Ichnotaxon / Ootaxon / Morphotaxon	Notes; Uncertain or tentative taxa are in small text; ~~crossed out~~ taxa are discredited.

The mammals listed below were compiled in a survey by Meng and colleagues in 2006, unless otherwise noted.

Genus	Species	County	Member	Material	Notes	Images
Acristatherium	A. yanensis	Beipiao	Lujiatun Bed		A eutherian	
Akidolestes	A. cifellii	Lingyuan	Dawangzhangzi Bed		A spalacotheriid "symmetrodont"	
Ambolestes	A. zhoui	Nincheng	Jianshangou Bed		A eutherian	
Chaoyangodens	C. lii	Lingyuan	Dawangzhangzi Bed		A eutriconodont	
Eomaia	E. scansoria	Lingyuan	Dawangzhangzi Bed		A tribosphenidan, possibly a eutherian or stem-therian	
Gobiconodon	G. zofiae	Beipiao	Lujiatun Bed		A gobiconodont	
Gobiconodon	G. luoianus		Lujiatun Bed		A gobiconodont; junior synonym of G. zofiae	
Jeholodens	J. jenkinsi	Chaoyang	Jianshangou Bed		A eutriconodont	
Juchilestes	J. liaoningensis	Beipiao	Lujiatun Bed		An amphidontid	
Jueconodon	J. cheni				A eutriconodont	
Maotherium	M. sinensis	Chaoyang	Jianshangou Bed		A zhangeotheriid "symmetrodont"	
Maotherium	M. asiaticus	Beipiao	Lujiatun Bed		A zhangeotheriid "symmetrodont"	
Meemannodon	M. lujiatunensis	Beipiao	Lujiatun Bed		A gobiconodont	
Origolestes	O. lii				A zhangeotheriid "symmetrodont"	
Ningchengodon	N. foxi	Ningcheng	Ningcheng Basin	A partial right dentary.	A symmetrodont.	
Repenomamus	R. giganticus	Beipiao	Lujiatun Bed		A gobiconodont	
Repenomamus	R. robustus	Beipiao	Lujiatun Bed		A large gobiconodont, which ate small dinosaurs	
Sinobaatar	S. lingyuanensis	Lingyuan	Jianshangou and Dawangzhangzi Beds		A multituberculate	
Sinodelphys	S. szalayi	Lingyuan	Dawangzhangzi Bed		A therian, initially interpreted as a metatherian and later reinterpreted as a eutherian	
Yanoconodon	Y. allini	Fengning			A eutricondodont	
Zhangheotherium	Z. quinquecuspidens	Chaoyang	Jianshangou Bed		A zhangeotheriid "symmetrodont"	

== Amphibians ==
Color key: Taxon / Reclassified taxon / Taxon falsely reported as present / Dubious taxon or junior synonym / Ichnotaxon / Ootaxon / Morphotaxon	Notes; Uncertain or tentative taxa are in small text; ~~crossed out~~ taxa are discredited.

Genus	Species	County	Member	Material	Notes	Images
Callobatrachus	C. sanyanensis	Sihetun	Jianshangou Bed		Junior synonym of Liaobatrachus	
Laccotriton	L. subsolanus	Paozhanggou	Fengshan Bed		A urodelan	
Liaobatrachus	L. grabaui	Sihetun	Jianshangou Bed		A spadefoot toad	
Liaobatrachus	L. zhaoi	Beipiao & Heitizigou	Lujiatun Bed & Jianshangou Bed		A spadefoot toad	
Mesophryne	M. beipiaoensis	Beipiao & Heitizigou	Lujiatun Bed & Jianshangou Bed		Junior synonym of Liaobatrachus	
Sinerpeton	S. fengshanensis	Paozhanggou	Fengshan Bed		A urodelan	

== Fish ==
Genus	Species	County	Member	Abundance	Notes	Images
Hybodontoidea indet.	Family, genus and species indeterminate				An elasmobranch known from a single dorsal fin spine	
Lycoptera	L. davidi		Jianshangou & Dawangzhangzi Beds	Also present in the Jiufotang Formation & Huajiying Formation	An osteoglossiform	
Lycoptera	L. muroii		Jingangshan Bed		An osteoglossiform	
Lycoptera	L. sinensis		Jianshangou Bed		An osteoglossiform	
Mesomyzon	M. mengae				A lamprey	
Peipiaosteus	P. pani		Jianshangou & Dawangzhangzi Bed	Also present in the Jiufotang Formation	A peipiaosteid fish related to sturgeons	
Protopsephurus	P. liui		Dawangzhangzi Bed	Also present in the Jiufotang & Huajiying Formations	A paddlefish	
Sinamia	S. liaoningensis		Jianshangou Bed		A bowfin	
Yanosteus	Y. longidorsalis			Also present in the Huajiying Formation	A peipiaosteid	

== Invertebrate fauna of the Yixian Formation ==
The invertebrate species listed below follow a survey by Chen and colleagues published in 2005, unless otherwise noted.

=== Arachnids ===
The arachnid species listed below follow a catalogue compiled by Dunlop, Penney and Jekel in 2010, unless otherwise noted.

Genus	Species	County	Member	Abundance	Notes	Images
?Araneus	A.? aethus				Orb-weaver spiders	
?Araneus	A.? beipiaoensis				Orb-weaver spiders	
?Araneus	A.? liaoxiensis				Orb-weaver spiders	
?Araneus	A.? reheensis				Orb-weaver spiders	
Cretaraneus	C. liaoningensis				A nephiline spider	
?Gnaphosa	G.? liaoningensis				A ground spider	
Jeholia	J. longchengi				A buthoid scorpion	
?Theridion	T.? atalus				A tangle web spider	

=== Beetles (Coleoptera) ===
Genus	Species	County	Member	Abundance	Notes	Images
Anoixis	A. complanus				A desmatin click beetle	
Apoclion	A. antennatus				Desmatin click beetles	
Apoclion	A. clavatus				Desmatin click beetles	
Apoclion	A. dolini				Desmatin click beetles	
Coptoclava	C. longipoda				A beetle	
Desmatinus	D. cognatus				A desmatin click beetle	
Fortiseode	F. pervalimand				An eodromeine trachypachid beetle	
Glaresis	G. orthochilus				A laresid scarab beetle	
Hydrophilopsia	H. gracilis				Hydrophiloid water scavenger beetles	
Hydrophilopsia	H. hydraenoides				Hydrophiloid water scavenger beetles	
Hydrophilopsia	H. shatrovskiyi				Hydrophiloid water scavenger beetles	
Lasiosyne	L. integera	Huangbanjigou Village, Liaoning Province, northeastern China.			A lasiosynid beetle.	
Lasiosyne	L. parva	Huangbanjigou Village, Liaoning Province, northeastern China.			A lasiosynid beetle.	
Liaoximordella	L. hongi				A mordellid beetle	
Mirimordella	M. gracilicruralis				A mordellid beetle	
Oxyporus	O. yixianus				An oxyporine rove beetle	
Paradesmatus	P. dilatatus				A desmati click beetle	
Parageotrupes	P. incanus				A Geotrupine scarab beetle	
Sinocupes	S. validus				A beetle	
Sinosperchopsis	S. silinae				A hydrophiloid water scavenger beetle	
Sinoxytelus	S. breviventer				Oxyteline rove beetles	
Sinoxytelus	S. euglypheus				Oxyteline rove beetles	
Sinoxytelus	S. longisetosus				Oxyteline rove beetles	

=== Crustaceans ===
Genus	Species	County	Member	Abundance	Notes	Images
Chenops	C. oblongus				Notostracans	
Chenops	C. yixianensis				Notostracans	
Cricoidoscelosus	C. aethus				Junior synonym of Palaeocambarus	
Cypridea	C. (Cypridea) liaoningensis		Jianshangou Bed		Ostracods	
Cypridea	C. (C.) sihetunensis		Jianshangou Bed		Ostracods	
Cypridea	C. (C.) veridica arguta		Jingangshan Bed		Ostracods	
Cypridea	C. (C.) sp.		Jianshangou Bed		Ostracods	
Cypridea	C. (Ulwellia) beipiaoensis	Beipiao	Jianshangou Bed		Ostracods	
Damonella	D. formosa		Jianshangou Bed		An ostracod	
Darwinula	D. leguminella		Jianshangou Bed		An ostracod	
Diestheria	D. jeholensis		Jianshangou Bed		Clam shrimps	
Diestheria	D. yixianensis		Dawangzhangzi Bed		Clam shrimps	
Diestheria	D.? sp.		Jianshangou Bed		Clam shrimps	
Eosestheria	E. jingangshanensis		Jingangshan Bed		Clam shrimps	
Eosestheria	E. lingyuanensis		Dawangzhangzi Bed		Clam shrimps	
Eosestheria	E. aff. middendorfii		Jingangshan Bed		Clam shrimps	
Eosestheria	E. ovata		Jianshangou Bed		Clam shrimps	
Eosestheria	E. sihetunensis		Jianshangou Bed		Clam shrimps	
Eosestheriopsis	E. gujialingensis		Jianshangou Bed		A clam shrimp	
Jeholops	J. hongi				A notostracan	
Liaoningogriphus	L. quadripartitus		Jianshangou and Dawangzhangzi beds		A shrimp	
Lycopterocypris	L. infantilis		Jianshangou Bed		An ostracod	
Mantelliana	M. sp.		Jianshangou Bed		An ostracod	
"Mongolarachne"	"M." chaoyangensis		Dawangzhangzi Beds		Junior synonym of Palaeocambarus	
Mongolianella	M. cf. palmosa		Jianshangou Bed		An ostracod	
Palaeocambarus	P. licenti				A crayfish	
Rhinocyrpis	R. jurassica		Jianshangou Bed		An ostracod	
Timiriasevia	T. jianshangouensis		Jianshangou Bed		An ostracod	
?Yanjiestheria	Y.? beipiaoensis	Beipiao	Jianshangou Bed		A clam shrimp	
Yanshania	Y. dabeigouensis		Jianshangou Bed		An ostracod	

=== Dragonflies (Odonata) ===
Color key: Taxon / Reclassified taxon / Taxon falsely reported as present / Dubious taxon or junior synonym / Ichnotaxon / Ootaxon / Morphotaxon	Notes; Uncertain or tentative taxa are in small text; ~~crossed out~~ taxa are discredited.

The dragonfly species listed below follow a review compiled by Zhang, Ren and Panf in 2008, unless otherwise noted.

Genus	Species	County	Member	Abundance	Notes	Images
Abrohemeroscopus	A. mengi				A dragonfly	
Aeschnidium	A. heishankowense				Reclassified as Sinaeschnidia heishankowense	
Aeschnidium	A. sp.				Reclassified as Sinaeschnidia heishankowense	
Archaeogomphus	A. labius			Nymphs	Reclassified as Yixiangomphus labius, which is a junior synonym of Sinaeschnidia cancellosa	
Bellabrunetia	B. catherinae				A dragonfly	
Chrysogomphus	C. beipiaoensis				A dragonfly	
Dissurus	D. liaoyuanensis			Poorly preserved nymph	Reclassified as Sinaeschnidia cf. cancellosa	
Dracontaeschnidium	D. orientale				A dragonfly	
Hebeiaeschnidia	H. fengningensis				A dragonfly	
Huaxiagomphus	H. taushanensis				A dragonfly	
Liogomphus	L. yixianensis				A dragonfly	
Mesocordulia	M. boreala				A corduliid dragonfly	
Palaeogomphus	P. labius				A dragonfly, reclassified as of Yixiangomphus labius, which is a junior synonym of Sinaeschnidia cancellosa	
Parapetala	P. liaoningensis				A dragonfly	
Parapetala	P. yixianensis		Jianshangou Unit			
Protoliupanshania	P. wangi		Jianshangou Unit		A liupanshaniid dragonfly	
Pseudocymatophlebia	P. bisecta	Ningcheng County		A well-preserved specimen.	An aktassiid dragonfly	
Pseudoliupanshania	P. magnanicellula		Jianshangou Unit			
Pseudosamarura	P. largina			One specimen, nymph	Reclassified as Sinaeschnidia cf. cancellosa	
Rudiaeschna	R. limnobia				An aeshnid dragonfly	
Sinaeschnidia	S. heishankowense		Jianshangou & Dawangzhangzi Beds	Adults and nymphs		
Sinaeschnidia	S. cancellosa				Junior synonym of S. heishankowense	
Sinaeschnidia	S. sp.			Indeterminate nymph specimens	Some nymph specimens have been given their own genera and species though probably belong so S. heishankowense but too poorly preserved to be certain	
Sinaktassia	S. tangi				An aktassiid dragonfly	
Sinogomphus	S. taoshanensis				A dragonfly	
Sinojagoria	S. imperfecta				A dragonfly	
Sopholibellula	S. amoena				Dragonflies	
Sopholibellula	S. eleganti				Dragonflies	
Stylaeschnidium	S. rarum				A dragonfly	
Telmaeshna	T. paradoxica	Beipiao			A dragonfly	
Turanophlebia	T. liaoningensis	Beipiao	Jianshangou Unit		A tarsophlebiid dragonfly.	
Yixiangomphus	Y. labius			Nymphs	Junior synonym of Sinaeschnidia cancellosa	

=== Flies (Diptera) ===
Genus	Species	County	Member	Abundance	Notes	Images
Alleremonomus	A. xingi		Jianshangou Bed		A brachyceran fly	
Atalosciophila	A. yanensis				A mycetophilid gnat	
Chironomaptera	C. gregaria				A phantom midge	
Gigantoberis	G. liaoningensis				A soldier fly	
Lichnoplecia	L. kovalevi				A protopleciid fly	
Palaepangonius	P. eupterus				A horse-fly	
Protapiocera	P. megista				An asiloid fly	
Protempis	P. minuta				A brachyceran fly	
Protonemestrius	P. jurassicus				A tangle-veined fly	

=== Wasps (Hymenoptera) ===
Genus	Species	County	Member	Abundance	Notes	Images
Abropelecinus	A. annulatus	Beipiao			An iscopinine pelecinid	
Angaridyela	A. robusta		Jianshangou Bed		A sawfly	
Azygopelecinus	A. clavatus	Beipiao			An iscopinine pelecinid	
Chengdeserphus	C. petidatus				A proctotrupid wasp	
Cretevania	C. exquisita	Beipiao			Hatchet wasps	
Cretevania	C. pristine	Beipiao	Jianshangou bed		Hatchet wasps	
Cretevania	C. vesca	Beipiao			Hatchet wasps	
Hoplitolyda	H. duolunica				The largest known sawfly ever	
Liaotoma	L. linearis				A xyelotomid woodwasp	
Manlaya	M. flexuosus				An aulacid woodwasp	
Procretevania	P. exquisita				Reclassified as Cretevania spp.	
Procretevania	P. pristine				Reclassified as Cretevania spp.	
Procretevania	P. vesca				Reclassified as Cretevania spp.	
Rudisiricius	R. belli				Praesiricid sawflies	
Rudisiricius	R. celsus				Praesiricid sawflies	
Rudisiricius	R. crassinodus				Praesiricid sawflies	
Scolichneumon	S. rectivenius				An ichneumonoid wasp	
Sinopelecinus	S. viriosus				A pelecinid	
Tanychora	T. exquisita		Jianshangou Bed		An ichneumon wasp	

=== Other insects ===
Genus	Species	County	Member	Abundance	Notes	Images
Abrigramma	A. calophleba				A kalligrammatid lacewing	
Alloraphidia	A. bliquivenatica				Snakeflies	
Alloraphidia	A. longistigmasa		Jianshangou Bed		Snakeflies	
Archeraphidia	A. shangyuanensis				A snakefly	
Baissopterus	B. liaoningensis				A snakefly	
Caenoephemera	C. shangyuanensis		Jianshangou Bed		A mayfly	
Caloraphidia	C. glossophylla				A snakefly	
Choromyrmeleon	C. othneius				An antlion	
Circulaboilus	C. aureus				A grig	
Cretophasmomima	C. melanogramma				A stick insect	Cretophasmomima, a stick insect
?Ephemeropsis	?E. trisetalis		Jianshangou and Jingangshan beds		A mayfly. Chinese specimens probably represent species of Epicharmeropsis	
Epicharmeropsis	E. hexavenulosus	Pingquan			Mayflies	
Epicharmeropsis	E. quadrivenulosus	Beipiao	Jianshangou Bed		Mayflies	
Hagiphasma	H. paradoxa		Jianshangou Bed		A stick insect	
Ilerdocossus	I. beipiaoensis				Palaeontinid hemipterans	
Ilerdocossus	I. exiguus				Palaeontinid hemipterans	
Ilerdocossus	I. exquisitus				Palaeontinid hemipterans	
Ilerdocossus	I. fengningensis				Palaeontinid hemipterans	
Ilerdocossus	I. hui				Palaeontinid hemipterans	
Ilerdocossus	I. pingquanensis				Palaeontinid hemipterans	
Ithigramma	I. multinervia				Kalligrammatid lacewings	
Kalligramma	K. liaoningensis		Jianshangou Bed		Kalligrammatid lacewings	
Karatavoblatta	K. formosa				A cockroach	
Liaoaphidia	L. fornicata				A snakefly	
Liaonemobius	L. tanae				A sword-tail cricket	
Longicellochrysa	L. yixiana				A mesochrysopid lacewing	
Mesascalaphus	M. yangi				An owlfly	
Mesolygaeus	M. laiyangensis				A water bug	
Metabittacus	M. colosseus		Jianshangou Bed		A scorpionfly	
Miracossus	M. gongi				Palaeontinid hemipterans	
Miracossus	M. ingentius				Palaeontinid hemipterans	
Nipponoblatta	N. acerba		Jianshangou Bed		A cockroach	
Oloberotha	O. sinica				A beaded lacewing	
Oregramma	O. aureolosa				Kalligrammatid lacewings	
Oregramma	O. illecebrosa				Kalligrammatid lacewings	
Pseudopulex	P. magnus				Stem-fleas	
Pseudopulex	P. tanlan				Stem-fleas	
Renphasma	R. sinica				A stick insect	
Saurophthirus	S. exquisitus				Stem-fleas	
Saurophthirus	S. laevigatus				Stem-fleas	
Sinochresmoda	S. magnicornia				A chresmodid water-skiing insect	
Sinosharaperla	S. zhaoi	Beipiao			A stonefly	
Sinoviparosiphum	S. lini				An aphid	
Sophogramma	S. lii		Jianshangou Bed		Kalligrammatid lacewings	
Sophogramma	S. pingquanica				Kalligrammatid lacewings	
Tetraphelerus	T. laetus				A moth	
Tyrannopsylla	T. beipiaoensis				A stem-flea	
Varicapitatus	V. sinuolatus	"Huangbanjigou, Chaomidian Village, Beipiao City."			A hemipteran	
Unnamed Vitimotauliidae	Unnamed				A caddisfly pupa, likely belonging to the Vitimotauliidae	

=== Molluscs ===
Genus	Species	County	Member	Abundance	Notes	Images
Amplovalvata	A. sp.		Jianshangou Bed		A gastropod	
Arguniella	A. lingyuanensis		Jianshangou Bed		A bivalve, also present in the Jiufotang and Fuxin Formations	
Arguniella	A. yanshanensis		Jianshangou Bed		A bivalve, also present in the Jiufotang Formation	
Bithynia	B. haizhouensis		Jingangshan Bed		A gastropod	
Corbicula	C. anderssoni		Jianshangou Bed		Reclassified as Sphaerium anderssoni	
Corbicula	C. jeholense		Jianshangou Bed		Reclassified as Sphaerium jeholense	
Gyraulus	G. sp.		Jianshangou Bed		A ramshorn snail	
Probaicalia	P. vitimensis		Jianshangou Bed		A gastropod	
Ptychastylus	P. harpaeformis		Jianshangou Bed		Gastropods	
Ptychastylus	P. cf. phillipi		Jianshangou Bed		Gastropods	
Sphaerium	S. anderssoni		Jianshangou Bed		A fingernail clam, also present in the Jiufotang Formation	
Sphaerium	S. jeholense		Jianshangou Bed		Junior synonym of S. anderssoni	
Sphaerium	S. selenginense		Jianshangou Bed		Junior synonym of S. anderssoni	
?Viviparus	V.? cf. matsumotoi		Jingangshan Bed		A snail	

== Flora of the Yixian Formation ==
=== Conifers ===
The coniferous trees and shrubs listed below were compiled in a survey by Wang and colleagues in 2006, unless otherwise noted.

Genus	Species	County	Member	Abundance	Notes	Images
Brachyphyllum					A cypress-like conifer	
Cephalotaxopsis					A yew	
Cunninghamia					A cypress	
Elatides					A cypress	
Elatocladus	E. leptophyllus				Conifers of uncertain classification	
Elatocladus	E. manchurica				Conifers of uncertain classification	
Liaoningocladus	L. boii		Jingangshan Bed		A conifer of uncertain classification	
Pagiophyllum					A cypress-like conifer	
Pityocladus					A pine	
Pityolepis	P. sp.				A pine	
Pityophyllum	P. cf. lindstroemi				A pine	
Pityostrobus					A pine	
Podozamites	P. lanceolatus				A conifer of uncertain classification	
Schizolepis	S. jeholensis					
?Sequoia	S.? jeholensis					
Taxus					A yew	
Torreya					A yew	
Yanliaoia	Y. sinensis					

=== Ferns ===
Genus	Species	County	Member	Abundance	Notes	Images
Cladophlebis	C. spp.					
Coniopteris	C. sp.					
Onychiopsis	O. elongata				Junior synonym of O. psilotoides	
Onychiopsis	O. psilotoides					
?Ruffordia	R.? sp.					

=== Flowering plants ===
Genus	Species	County	Member	Abundance	Notes	Images
Archaefructus	A. eoflora		Jianshangou Bed		A primitive, aquatic angiosperm	
Archaefructus	A. liaoningensis		Jianshangou Bed			
Archaefructus	A. sinensisis		Dawangzhangzi Bed			
Callianthus	C. dilae	Liaoning			A plant with true flowers	
?Davallia	D.? niehhutzuensis					
Erenia	E. stenoptera	Liaoning			Actually a specimen of Callianthus	
Leefructus	L. mirus				A eudicot	
Liaoxia	L. chenii					
?Potamogeton	P.? jeholensis					
Ranunculus	R. jeholensis				Junior synonym of Potamogeton jeholensis	
Sinocarpus	S. decussatus				A primitive eudicot	

=== Ginkgos ===
Genus	Species	County	Member	Abundance	Notes	Images
Baiera	B. cf. gracilis					
Baiera	B. orientalis					
Czekanowskia	C. rigida					
Ginkgo	G. apodes					
Ginkgoites	G. sibiricus					
Leptostrobus	L. sp.					
?Nageiopsis	N.? sp.					
Phoenicopsis	P. cf. augustifolia					
Solenites	S. sp.					
Sphenobaiera	S. longifola					

=== Other plants ===
Genus	Species	County	Member	Abundance	Notes	Images
Archaeamphora	A. longicervia				Originally described as pitcher plant, later study confirmed that it is likely to be an insect galls on Liaoningocladus.	
Chaoyangia	C. liangii				A gnetale gymnosperm	
Chaoyangicarpus	C. liangii				Junior synonym of Chaoyangia liangii	
Ephedra	E. sp.				A gymnosperm	
Equisetum	E. sp.				A horsetail	
Eragrosites	E. changii				A grass-like gnetale gymnosperm	
Siphonospermum	S. simplex	Beipiao	Jianshangou Bed		A gnetale gymnosperm	
Tyrmia	T. sp.				A bennettite	
