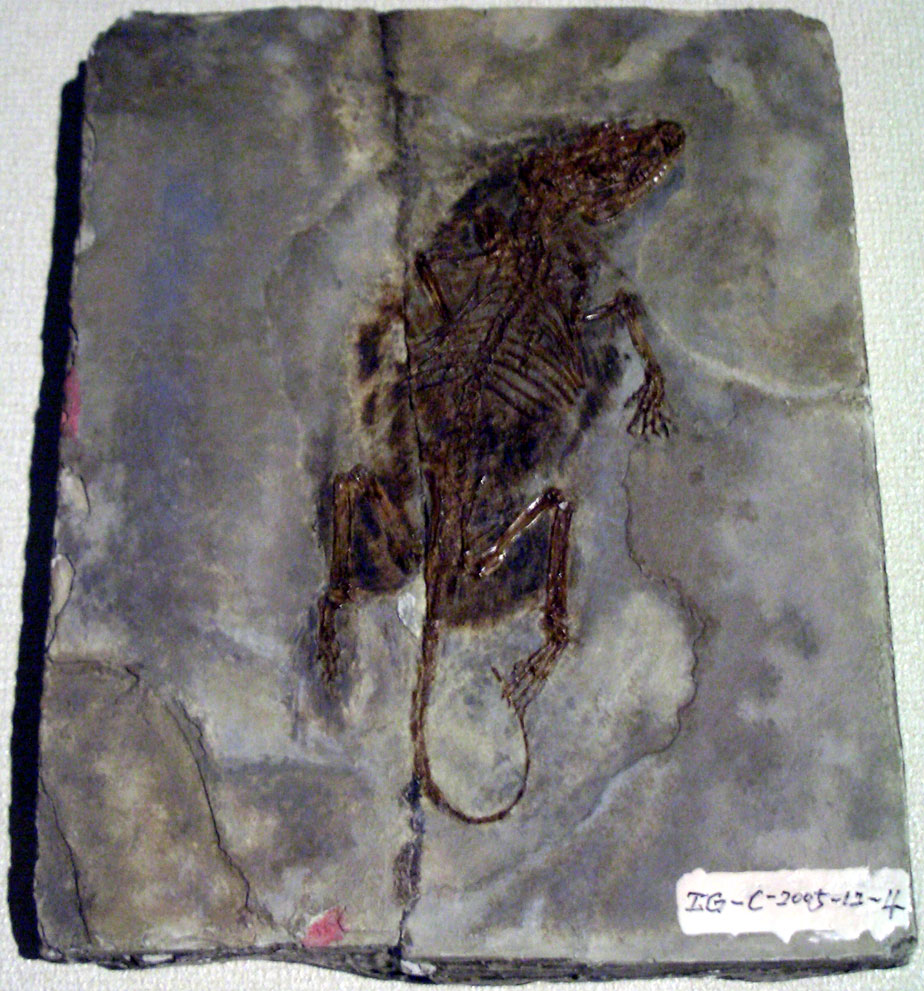
- Fossil of Zhangheotherium, a "symmetrodont"
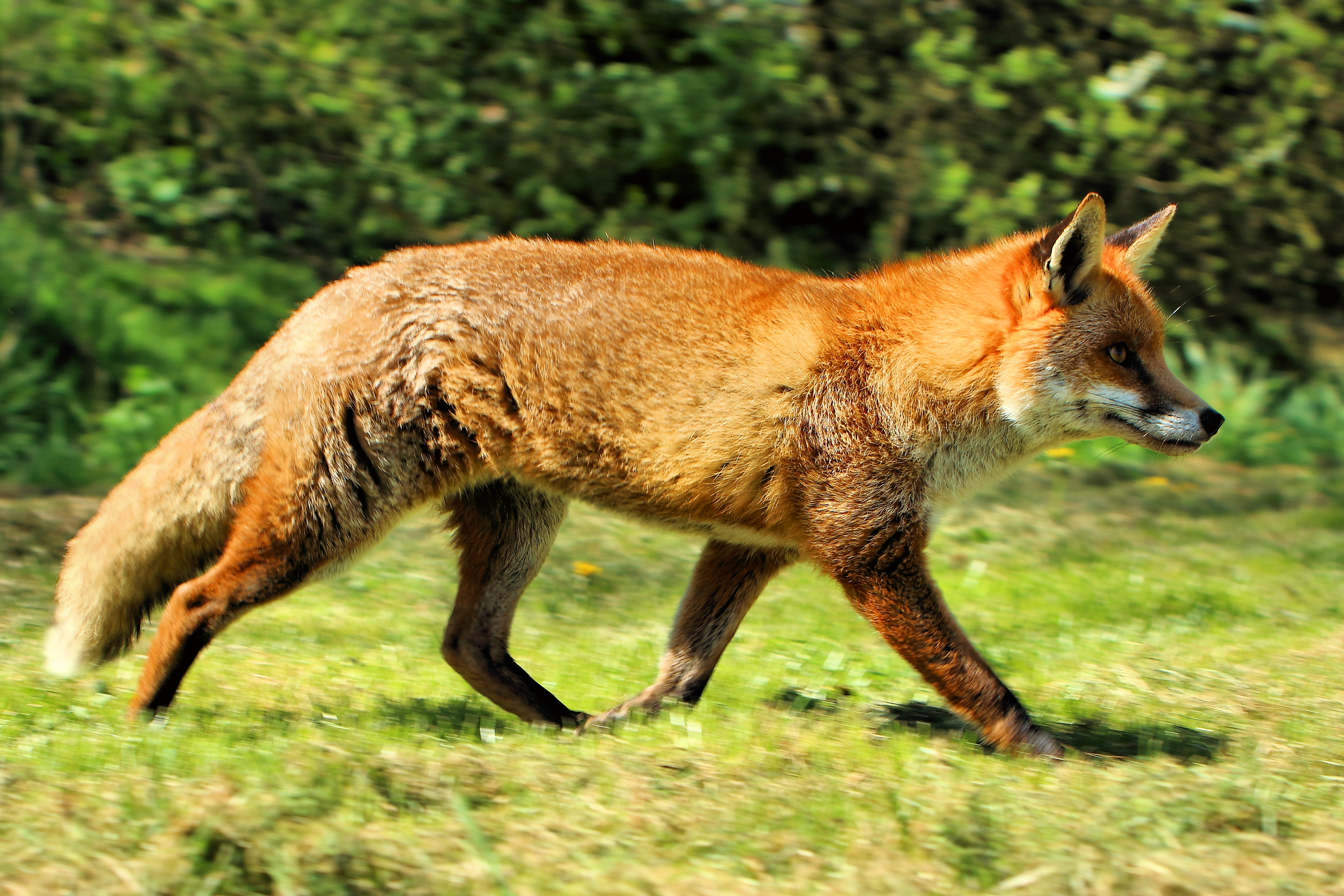
- Red fox, a modern-day trechnotherian

Scientific classification
- Kingdom: Animalia
- Phylum: Chordata
- Class: Mammalia
- Clade: Theriiformes
- Clade: Trechnotheria; McKenna, 1975

Subgroups
- †Tinodontidae; †"Symmetrodonta" (paraphyletic); †Spalacotheriidae; †Zhangheotheriidae (paraphyletic); Cladotheria

= Trechnotheria =

Trechnotheria Temporal range: Middle Jurassic–Recent

Clade of mammals

Trechnotheria is a group of mammals that includes the therians and some fossil mammals from the Mesozoic Era. It includes both the extinct symmetrodonts and the living Cladotheria.

Trechnotheria has been assigned various ranks, but was originally described as a "superlegion" by the naming authority. A later node-based definition for Trechnotheria was the clade comprising the last common ancestor of Zhangheotherium and living therian mammals, and all its descendants. Alternatively it can be defined as the group with true symmetrodontia, being defined as an apomorphy rather than being defined as a node, the redefinition includes the Tinodontids.

== Characteristics ==
Like most Mesozoic mammal groups, early trechnotherians are known mainly from their teeth. Hence, one of the most prominent features of this group is the "hypertrophied postvallum/prevallid shearing mechanism", along with other dental characters. Features of the shoulder blade, tibia, humerus, and ankle joint also diagnose this clade.

== Phylogeny ==
A cladogram based on Luo, Cifelli & Kielan-Jaworowska, 2001, Luo, Kielan-Jaworowska & Cifelli, 2002 and, Kielan-Jaworowska, Cifelli & Luo, 2004.

- - †Gobiconodonta
  - - †Amphilestidae
    - - †Amphidontidae
      - - †Eutriconodonta
        - Trechnotheria
          - †Spalacotheriida
          - Cladotheria
            - †Dryolestida
            - Zatheria
              - †Vincelestidae
              - - †Amphitheriida
                - †Peramuridae
                - Boreosphenida
                  - †Aegialodontia
                  - - †Pappotheriidae
                    - Theria
                      - Metatheria→Marsupialia
                      - Eutheria→Placentalia

- Unassigned Trechnotheria:
  - †Austrotriconodon mckennai Bonaparte 1986 {Austrotriconodontidae Bonaparte 1990}
  - †Chaoyangodens lii Hou & Meng 2014
- Paraphyletic Symmetrodonta Simpson 1925
  - †Atlasodon monbaroni Sigogneau-Russell 1991 [Dryolestida, or Zatheria indet., milk tooth (Averianov, 2002)]
  - †Kennetheredium leesi Sigogneau-Russell 2003a
  - †Kotatherium haldanei Datta 1981
  - †Trishulotherium kotaensis Yadagiri 1985
- Unassigned Cladotheria:
  - †Afriquiamus nesovi Sigogneau-Russell 1999
  - †Butlerigale Kühne 1968
  - †Chunnelodon alopekodes Ensom & Sigogneau-Russell 1998
  - †Guimarota freyi Kuhne 1968
- Unassigned Zatheria:
  - †Arguimus khoshajari Dashzeveg 1979 [Arguitherium cromptoni Dashzeveg 1994] {Arguimuridae Dashzeveg 1994 [Arguitheriidae Dashzeveg 1994]}
  - †Minimus richardfoxi Sigogneau-Russell 1999
  - †Magnimus ensomi Sigogneau-Russell 1999
  - †Mozomus shikamai Li et al. 2005 {Mozomuridae Li et al. 2005}
  - †Nanolestes Martin 2002
    - †N. drescherae Martin 2002
    - †N. krusati Martin 2002
    - †N. mackennai Martin, Averianov & Pfretzschner 2010
- Unassigned Boreosphenida:
  - †Argaliatherium robustum Cifelli & Davis 2015
  - †Carinalestes murensis Cifelli & Davis 2015
  - †Hypomylos Sigogneau-Russell 1992
    - †H. phelizoni Sigogneau-Russell 1992
    - †H. micros Sigogneau-Russell 1994
  - †Picopsidae Fox 1980
    - †Picopsis pattersoni Fox 1980
    - †Tirotherium aptum Montellano-Ballesteros & Fox 2015

Alternatively, the zanjeotherids would be ancestral to both the spalacotherids and the cladotherians (driolestoids and prototribosphenids), with the tinodontids equally paraphyletic. The group that contains the Spalacotheriidae and Cladotheria is called Alethinotheria (sensu Alexander O Averianov. 2013), which was initially proposed to highlight the closeness between the spalacotherids and the meridiolestids.

- Theriimorpha
  - Fruitafossor †
  - - Eutriconodonta* †
    - Trechnotheria true symmetrodontia
      - - Trishulotherium †
        - Tinodon †
      - - Yermackia †
        - - Gobiotheriodon †
          - - - Kiyatherium †
              - - Origolestes †
                - Anebodon †
            - - Zhangheoterium †
              - - Maotherium †
                - Alethinotheria
                  - Spalacotheriidae †
                  - Cladotheria
                    - Meridiolestida †
                    - - - Chunnelodon †
                        - Dryolestida †
                      - - Donodontidae †
                        - Prototribosphenida

== See also ==
- Allotheria
- Cladotheria
