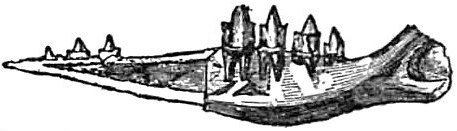
- Spalacotherium tricuspidens

Scientific classification
- Kingdom: Animalia
- Phylum: Chordata
- Class: Mammalia
- Order: †Symmetrodonta
- Family: †Spalacotheriidae
- Genus: †Spalacotherium; Owen, 1854

Species
- Spalacotherium tricuspidens Owen, 1854 (type); Spalacotherium taylori Clemens & Lees, 1971; Spalacotherium henkeli Krebs, 1985; Spalacotherium evansae Ensom & Sigogneau-Russell, 2000; Spalacotherium hookeri Gill, 2004

Synonyms
- Peralestes longirostris Owen, 1871

= Spalacotherium =

Spalacotherium Temporal range: Berriasian–Barremian

Extinct family of mammals

Spalacotherium is a genus of extinct mammal from the Early Cretaceous of Europe. The type species Spalacotherium tricuspidens was originally named by Richard Owen in 1854, and its material includes maxillary and dentary fragments and many teeth from the Berriasian Lulworth Formation of southern England. Referred species include S. taylori, S. evansae and S. hookeri also from the Lulworth deposits, and S. henkeli from Barremian deposits of Galve, Spain. The Lulworth taxon Peralestes longirostris, named by Owen in 1871, is a junior synonym of the type species S. tricuspidens. Spalacotherium is the namesake taxon of the family Spalacotheriidae, which is an extinct clade within Trechnotheria that may be closely related to the Gondwanan clade Meridiolestida, or united with the family Zhangheotheriidae to form Symmetrodonta.S. evansae is also from the Berriasian aged Angeac-Charente bonebed in western France.

- Spalacotheriidae
  - Spalacotherium
  - - Akidolestes
    - - Symmetrolestes
      - Spalacolestinae
        - Spalacotheroides
        - - Yaverlestes
          - - - Heishanlestes
              - Lactodens
            - - Spalacotheridium
              - - Spalacolestes
                - Symmetrodontoides
