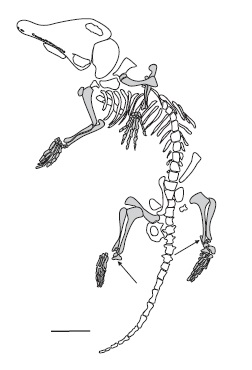
- Skeleton

Scientific classification
- Kingdom: Animalia
- Phylum: Chordata
- Class: Mammalia
- Order: †Symmetrodonta
- Family: †Spalacotheriidae
- Genus: †Akidolestes; Li & Luo, 2006

Type species
- †Akidolestes cifellii Li & Luo, 2006

= Akidolestes =

Akidolestes Temporal range: Early Cretaceous, 122 Ma

Extinct genus of mammals

Akidolestes is an extinct genus of mammals of the family Spalacotheriidae, a group of mammals related to therians (the subclass containing marsupials and placentals).

The genus name, Akidolestes, is derived from akido, Greek for point, and lestes, Greek for thief. Akido- refers to the pointed snout and -lestes is a common suffix for fossil mammals. The specific epithet, cifelli, is in honor of Richard L. Cifelli, a prominent researcher in prehistoric mammals.

An Akidolestes fossil preserved with a complete post-cranium and a partial skull was discovered in the Yixian Formation of Liaoning, China. The holotype of Akidolestes cifellii, reserved in the Nanjing Institute of Geology and Paleontology, Chinese Academy of Sciences, has a complete skeleton with a partial skull and dentition. It displays characteristics of monotremes but appears to be more related to modern therian mammals.

Although it had some features similar to monotremes in the lumbar vertebrae, pelvis, and hindlimb, Akidolestes cifellii is still placed in the Spalacotheriidae family and close to Zhangheotherium and Maotherium. Those convergent synapomorphies might derive from a shared early common ancestor. Based on the analysis and comparison of anatomy and locomotory features of Akidolestes cifellii with its related taxa, there is a hypothesis that spalacotheroids might have evolved in Eurasia and then dispersed to North America, which is consistent with the geodispersal pattern common to several mammalian groups during the Early Cretaceous period.

Most fossils of Mesozoic mammals exist as teeth or jaw fragments only. Akidolestes cifellii was the third spalacotheroid species discovered with a complete skeleton in the Yixian Formation, after Zhangheotherium and Maotherium.

== Description ==
=== Dentition ===
The Zhangheotheriidae and Spalacotheriidae families form the superfamily Spalacotheroidea. Akidolestes cifellii has acute triangulation of the molar cusp pattern, which is characteristic of Spalacotheroids. However, unlike the Maotherium, which has symmetrical premolar and molar patterns, Akidolestes's premolars and molars are gradually longer, respectively. Also, Akidolestes has protocristid on its molars, which distinguish it other from Zhangheotherium and Maotherium. The mandible of Akidolestes cifellii is similar to that of Zhangheotherium and Maotherium. They all have a coronoid process and dentary condyle. At the same time, the structure and surface features of the teeth of Akidolestes are closer to spalacotheriids as compared with zhangheotheriids. Based on these overall dental characteristics, Akidolestes has been classified as a member of Spalacotheriidae.

=== Post-cranial skeleton ===
There are several features in Akidolestes cifellii that are similar to monotremes rather than more common Mesozoic mammals. In the original paper describing Akidolestes cifellii, the author compared Ornithorhynchus and Zhangheotherium with Akidolestes cifellii. Zhangheotherium, a Mesozoic mammal, belongs to the Spalacotheriidae family. Ornithorhynchus is a living monotreme.

On the pelvis, the epipubic bones of Akidolestes cifellii and Ornithorhynchus have a broad and triangular shape, but the epipubis of Zhangheotherium is a narrow bone. Both Ornithorhynchus and Akidolestes have the tubercle for the M. psoas minor muscle on the pubis and tuber coxae on the ilium, but those are absent in Zhangheotherium. On the femur, Zhangheotherium has a symmetrical distal medial condyle and a distal lateral condyle, but those condyles are more asymmetrical in both Akidolestes and Ornithorhynchus. Moreover, compared to Zhangheotherium, both Akidolestes and Ornithorhynchus have a shorter neck on the femur. On the fibula and tibia, Akidolestes and Ornithorhynchus have hypertrophied parafibular processes, proximolateral tuberosity of the tibia, and a distal tibial malleolus, all of which are absent in Zhangheotherium.

Except the pelvic girdle and hindlimbs, Akidolestes shares several forelimb features with living monotremes as well. Similar to its hindlimbs, Zhangheotherium has asymmetrical condyles on the humerus, but the condyles of the humerus on Akidolestes and Ornithorhynchus are asymmetrical. Additionally, Zhangheotherium and other Mesozoic mammals have a straight tibia, but the tibia on Akidolestes and Ornithorhynchus are more curved. Another striking feature of Akidolestes that is distinguishable from other Mesozoic mammals is the trochanter. The trochanter on Zhangheotherium is bigger, tall, and vertical, but the trochanter on Akidolestes is smaller, broader, and triangular in shape, which is similar to Ornithorhynchus.

== Paleobiology ==
Differences in the post-cranial skeleton between Akidolestes cifellii and related taxa allow insights into ecological differentiation within early therian mammal evolution. Correlation between limb posture and locomotor function in Akidolestes cifellii indicates that the hypertrophied parafibular process on the fibula helped the flexed function of the knee joint. A short neck on the femur and asymmetrical condyles on the humerus indicate a horizontal orientation of the femur. Akidolestes probably had a parasagittal forelimb posture and most likely a semi-erect or sprawling posture for both forelimbs and hindlimbs.

Akidolestes is not considered a traditional terrestrial mammal like Zhangheotherium and Maotherium, although there is debate about whether asymmetrical femoral condyles suggest that Akidolestes was a terrestrial mammal or an arboreal mammal. In "Postcranial Skeleton of the Cretaceous Mammal Akidolestes cifellii and Its Locomotor Adaptations", the author argued that both Zhangheotherium and Maotherium are considered as terrestrial mammals, and they both have symmetrical knee joints. The author noted that asymmetrical femoral condyles indicate that Akidolestes lived in arboreal habitats, but the hypertrophied parafibula on the fibula and medial malleolus on the tibia suggests Akidolestes was a terrestrial mammal.

However, girdle is an important factor in inferring the habitat preference of Akidolestes as well. On the pectoral girdle, Akidolestes has glenoid fossa smaller than the humeral head, which offer a great range of rotation for the humerus. Moreover, Akidolestes has a scapula with a triangular outline, which is similar to Ornithorhynchus and Haldanodon, but the scapula of Zhangheotherium is rectangular in shape. Ornithorhynchus is a semifossorial and semiaquatic monotreme which can swim and burrow. Haldanodon is a terrestrial mammal, and it is semifossorial and semiaquatic as well. At the same time, the hook-like, large coracoid process on the scapula make Akidolestes closer to arboreal mammals than to terrestrial mammals. Overall, Akidolestes was likely a terrestrial mammal but not restricted to singular living habitats.

== Geology and paleoenvironment ==
An Akidolestes cifellii fossil was found in the Yixian Formation. Yixian formation is one composition of Jehol Group. The Yixian Formation is dated to the Berriasian (145–140 mya). The stratum of the Yixian Formation is correlated with other localities including the Jingangshan Locality, Jianshangou Locality, and Lujiatun Locality. Other mammals found in the Yixian Formation include eutriconodontans, multituberculates, symmetrodonts, metatherians, and eutherians.

== Classification ==
Akidolestes cifellii and Spalacotherium are sister taxa and share a common ancestor with Zhangheotherium. The clade that contains these three species is Spalacotheroidea, within the Trechnotherian group. The Theria clade includes Metatheria and Eutheria, which is the outgroup of Spalacotheroidea. Theriiformes includes Theria and Spalacotheroidea. (The cladogram below does not perfectly contain all important details due to a technical issue.) The cladogram is based on the content from "Evolution of the patellar sesamoid bone in mammals", "A cretaceous symmetrodont therian with some monotreme-like postcranial features", and Classification of Mammals Above the species Level.

- - Morganucodontidae
  - Mammalia
    - Yinotheria→Monotremata
    - Theriiformes
      - Allotheria→Multituberculata
      - Holotheria
        - Kuehneotheria
        - Spalacotheriidae("Symmetrodonta")
          - Zhangheotherium
          - - Spalacotherium
            - Akidolestes
