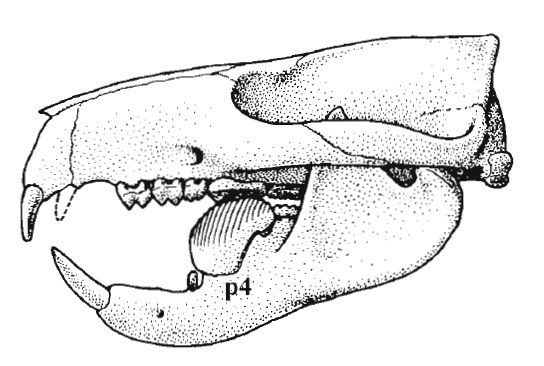
- Skull of the multituberculate Ptilodus (Allotheria)
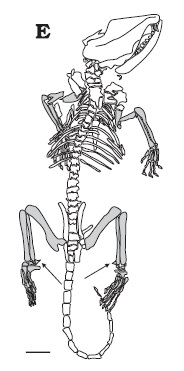
- Skeleton of Maotherium (Trechnotheria)

Scientific classification
- Kingdom: Animalia
- Phylum: Chordata
- Class: Mammalia
- Clade: Theriimorpha
- Clade: Theriiformes; Rowe, 1988

Subgroups
- †Allotheria; †Tinodontidae; Trechnotheria

= Theriiformes =

Theriiformes Temporal range: Middle Jurassic–Recent

Clade of mammals

Theriiformes is a clade of mammals. The term was coined by Timothy B. Rowe in his doctoral dissertation, and is defined as the clade formed by the most recent common ancestor of multituberculates (which form part of the broader group Allotheria, along with Gondwanatheria and likely all or part of Haramiyida) and Theria (the group containing marsupials and placental mammals). Mammals more closely related to therians than to multituberculates are included in the clade Trechnotheria.

As multituberculates are usually considered more closely related to therians than monotremes are (though some studies have recovered allotherians as less closely related to therians than monotremes are, placing them outside of crown group Mammalia) it is considered to be a subgroup of the mammalian crown group.

== Cladogram ==
The cladogram below follows Luo et al. (2016):

- Mammalia
  - Australosphenida
  - Theriimorpha
    - Fruitafossor
    - - Eutriconodonta
      - Theriiformes
        - - Gondwanatheria
          - Multituberculata
        - Trechnotheria
          - Spalacotherioidea
          - Cladotheria
            - Dryolestoidea
            - Theria
