= Infernolestes =

Infernolestes Temporal range: Valanginian

Scientific classification
- Kingdom: Animalia
- Phylum: Chordata
- Class: Mammalia
- Order: †Symmetrodonta
- Family: †Spalacotheriidae
- Genus: †Infernolestes
- Species: †I. rougieri

Binomial name
- †Infernolestes rougieri Cifelli et al., 2014

Infernolestes is an extinct genus of spalacotheriid that lived during the Early Cretaceous epoch.

== Distribution ==
Infernolestes rougieri is known from the Lakota Formation of the United States.
