= Anebodon =

Anebodon Temporal range: Early Cretaceous

Scientific classification
- Kingdom: Animalia
- Phylum: Chordata
- Class: Mammalia
- Order: †Symmetrodonta
- Family: †Zhangheotheriidae
- Genus: †Anebodon
- Species: †A. luoi

Binomial name
- †Anebodon luoi Bi et al., 2016

Extinct genus of zhangheotheriid mammal

Anebodon is an extinct monotypic genus of zhangheotheriid mammal that lived in East Asia during the Early Cretaceous epoch.

== Etymology ==
The generic name Anebodon is composed of the Greek language roots anebos and odontos, meaning young and tooth, respectively. The specific epithet of the type species, Anebodon luoi, honours the palaeontologist Zhe-Xi Luo for his contributions to the study of Mesozoic mammals.
