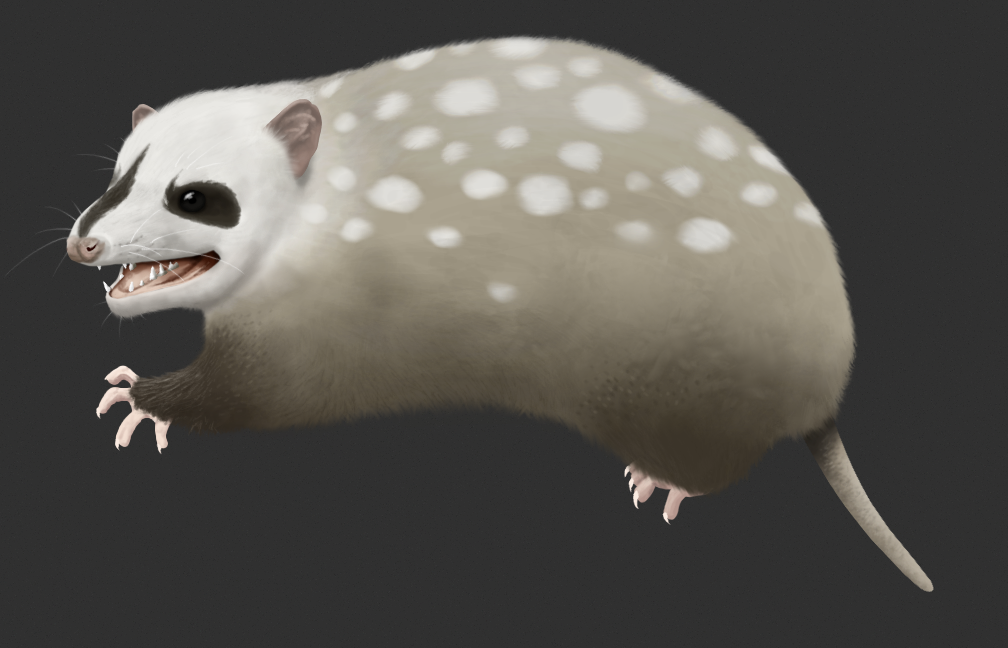
- Speculative restoration of Yaverlestes gassoni

Scientific classification
- Kingdom: Animalia
- Phylum: Chordata
- Class: Mammalia
- Order: †Symmetrodonta
- Family: †Spalacotheriidae
- Genus: †Yaverlestes
- Species: †Y. gassoni

Binomial name
- †Yaverlestes gassoni Sweetman, 2008

= Yaverlestes =

Yaverlestes Temporal range: Early Cretaceous, 130 Ma

Extinct family of mammals

Yaverlestes gassoni is an extinct mammal from the Spalacotheriidae which dates to the early Cretaceous period, 130 million years ago. It is part of the Wessex Formation from the Isle of Wight, England. The holotype, BMNH M 54386, is a partial jaw discovered near Yaverland.

The genus name, Yaverlestes, is derived from Yaverland, the location of its discovery, and lestes, Greek for thief. The specific epithet, gassoni, is in honour of Brian Gasson, its discoverer.
