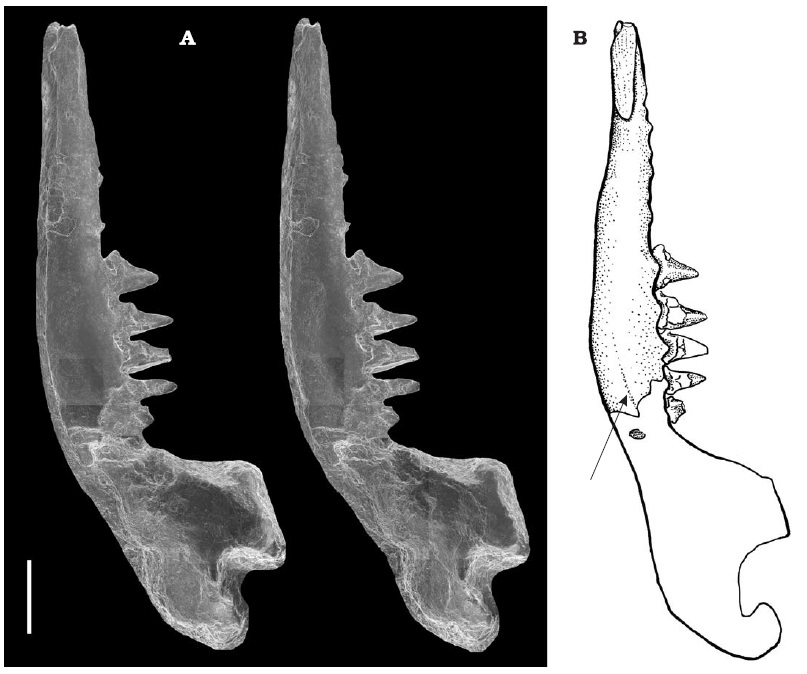
- Symmetrolestes parvus (NSM PV 20562, holotype). A. Lingual stereo view of the dentary. B. Drawing of the jaw in approximately the same position as in A.

Scientific classification
- Kingdom: Animalia
- Phylum: Chordata
- Class: Mammalia
- Order: †Symmetrodonta
- Family: †Spalacotheriidae
- Genus: †Symmetrolestes

Type species
- †Symmetrolestes parvus Tsubamoto and Rougier, 2004

= Symmetrolestes =

Symmetrolestes Temporal range: Late Barremian-Late Aptian 125–115 Ma

Extinct family of mammals

Symmetrolestes is an extinct genus of small spalacotheriid mammal from the Early Cretaceous period of Japan. The genus contains one species known as S. parvus, the type fossil (which is only fossil known) is from fluvial deposits located in the Dinosaur Quarry in the Kitadani Formation, near the city of Katsuyama which lies alongside valley of the Sugiyamagawa River. It was described by Tsubamoto and Rougier in 2004. The holotype is kept at the National Science Museum, Tokyo, Japan.

== Description ==
The type specimen (NSM PV 20562, holotype) is known from a fragmentary right jaw with the first incisor and five postcanine teeth preserved. Symmetrolestes is more derived than zhangheotheriids as it had acute−angled molariform teeth with completely developed shearing surfaces, taller crowns on its teeth and more complete cingulids. It differs from other spalacotheriids due to the fact it had fewer molariform teeth, a higher number of premolariform teeth and gradual transition between premolariforms and molariforms. The jaw is gracile, slender, and never reaches more than 1.5 times the height of the teeth.

== Etymology ==
Symmetrolestes means "symmetric hunter", The root Symmetro is in reference to the symmetric aspect of the molars and the root lestes meaning "hunter", a common ending of the taxonomic names of most Mesozoic mammals based on the dubious hunting habits of these of such mammals. The species name parvus means small, in reference to its small stature.

== Classification ==
A cladistic analysis that was made shows that Symmetrolestes is a sister group to other Spalacotheriidae. The scientists went on to say that the combination of the occurrences of the more primitive spalacotheriids and Symmetrolestes, in Japan and of Zhangheotheriidae, which is the sister taxon of Spalacotheriidae, in China suggests a possibility the East Asian origins of the group Spalacotheriidae.

== Paleoecology ==
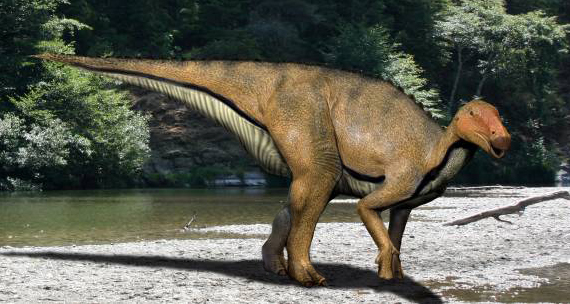
Koshisaurus and other large dinosaurs shared their habitat with Symmetrolestes and other mammals

The type specimen of Symmetrolestes was found in Barremian-Aptian layers in the Kitadani Formation, the formation belongs to the Tetori Group in which is located in Central Japan. The formation shows a wide array of faunae, mainly many species of plants like cycads and conifers, which are mainly represented by cones and shoots. The animal fauna mainly consisted of dinosaurs such as the medium-sized theropod Fukuiraptor, the small ornithopod Fukuisaurus, and the giant sauropod Fukuititan. Smaller dinosaurs and basal birds like Fukuivenator and Fukuipteryx also coexisted with Symmetrolestes. The formation also preserves fossils of crocodilians belonging to the group Eusuchia, turtle shells and the remains of prehistoric mollusks. Two other mammals from the Kitadani Formation remain undescribed. The Kitadani Formation was likely not an arid environment, but one that was more wet with meandering rivers. Volcanic sediments have also been found in the formation in the form of tuffs.
