= Spelaeomolitor =

Spelaeomolitor Temporal range: Barremian–Aptian

Scientific classification
- Kingdom: Animalia
- Phylum: Chordata
- Class: Mammalia
- Subclass: Theria
- Genus: †Spelaeomolitor
- Species: †S. speratus

Binomial name
- †Spelaeomolitor speratus Martin et al., 2023

Extinct genus of stem group therian

Spelaeomolitor is an extinct monotypic genus of basal therian mammal that lived in Germany during the Early Cretaceous epoch.

== Etymology ==
The generic name Spelaeomolitor derives from the Latin words spelaeum and molitor, which respectively mean cave and miller. The generic name references the fossil being found in a cavern and the inferred grinding function of the mammal's talonid. The specific epithet of the type species, Spelaeomolitor speratus, means "hoped for". This is because the discoverers anticipated and hoped for a tribosphenic molar to be discovered at the Balve locality.
