= Origolestes =

Origolestes Temporal range: Aptian
- Fossil skeleton, Chaoyang Paleontological Museum

Scientific classification
- Kingdom: Animalia
- Phylum: Chordata
- Class: Mammalia
- Order: †Symmetrodonta
- Family: †Zhangheotheriidae
- Genus: †Origolestes
- Species: †O. lii

Binomial name
- †Origolestes lii Mao et al., 2019

Extinct genus of mammal

Origolestes is an extinct monotypic genus of stem group therian that lived in East Asia during the Aptian stage of the Early Cretaceous epoch.

== Palaeobiology ==
=== Social behaviour ===
Six individuals of Origolestes lii have been found together, likely the result of all being buried simultaneously as they slept huddled together.
