= Ghost lineage =

Phylogenetic lineage that is inferred to exist but has no fossil record

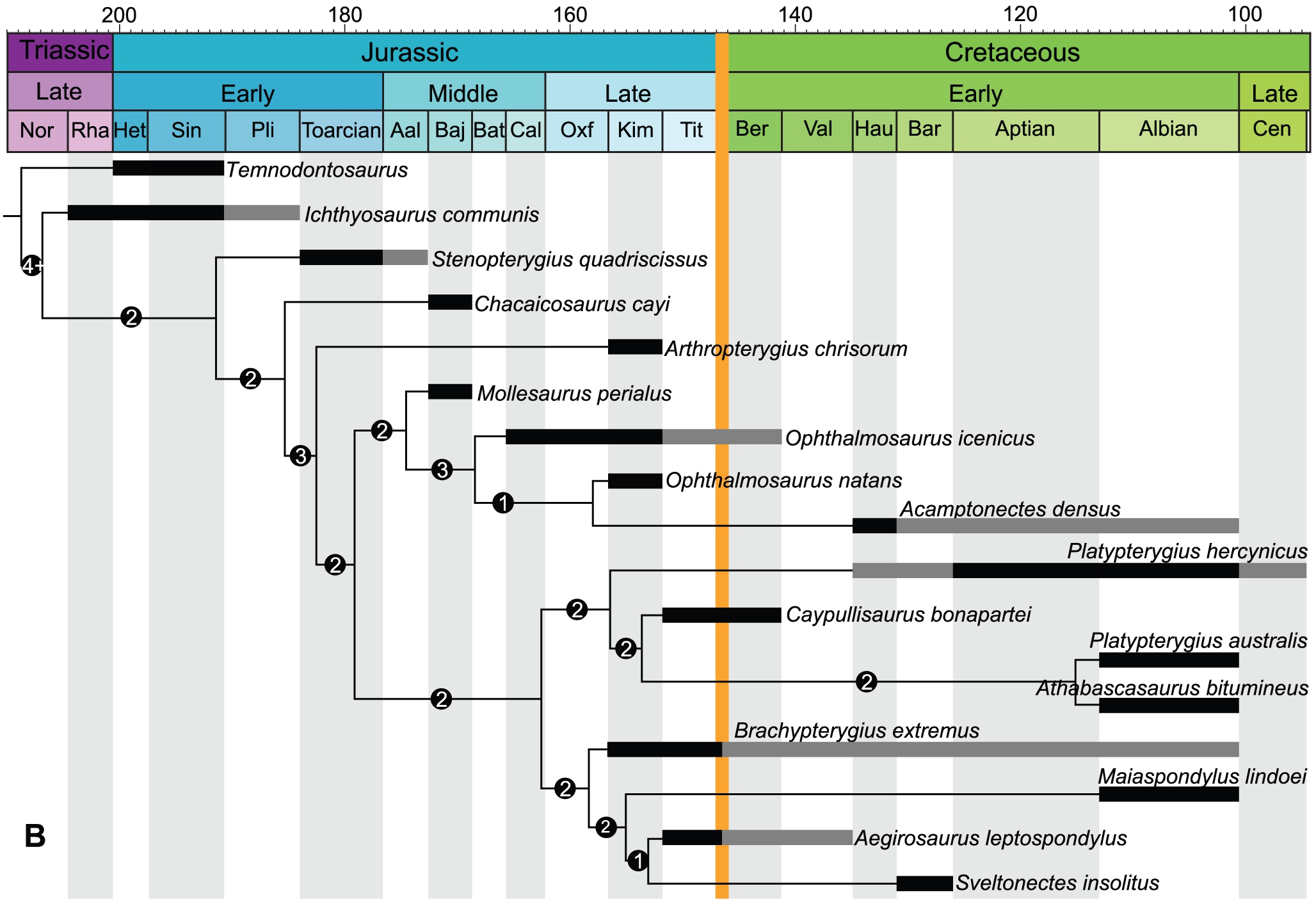
Phylogeny of ichthyosaurs. Thick horizontal lines signify the existence of a fossil record for the respective time and taxa. Thin lines represent ghost lineages.

A ghost lineage is a hypothesized ancestor in a species lineage that has left no fossil evidence, but can still be inferred to exist or have existed because of gaps in the fossil record or genomic evidence. The process of determining a ghost lineage relies on fossilized evidence before and after the hypothetical existence of the lineage and extrapolating relationships between organisms based on phylogenetic analysis. Ghost lineages assume unseen diversity in the fossil record and serve as predictions for what the fossil record could eventually yield; these hypotheses can be tested by unearthing new fossils or running phylogenetic analyses.

Ghost lineages and Lazarus taxa are related concepts, as both stem from gaps in the fossil record. A ghost lineage is any gap in a taxon's fossil record, with or without reappearance, while a Lazarus taxon is a type of ghost lineage wherein a species is believed to have gone extinct due to an absence of it in the fossil record, but then reappears after a period of time. Examples of Lazarus taxa include the famous coelacanths, as well as the Philippine naked-backed fruit bat.

== Name ==
In 1992, an article stated: "These additional entities are taxa [groups] that are predicted to occur by the internal branching structure of phylogenetic trees.... I refer to these as ghost lineages because they are invisible to the fossil record." Phylogenetic trees constructed based on fossil records and Darwin's theory of evolution often give an indication that species with similar phenotypes existed, although its fossil has not been discovered.

Ghost lineages and ghost taxa are not the same. A ghost lineage is a one direct connection between the descendant and the ancestor, whereas a ghost taxon has many split descendants.

== Examples ==
A selection of gaps within the fossil record of animals having hard body parts. Other notable examples are Chronoperates and Protanguilla.

When looking back at extinct organisms, there are some groups of organisms (or lineages) that have gaps in their fossil records. These organisms or species may be closely related to one another, but there are no traces in the fossil records or sediment beds that might shed some light on their origins. Biologists may infer the existence of ghost lineages by examining sequential stratigraphic units in the fossil record. Fossils can then be mapped onto cladograms and range charts to assess which lineages are missing in the fossil record. A classic example is the coelacanth, a type of fish related to the lungfishes and to primitive tetrapods. Coelacanths have been around for the past 80 million years but have failed to leave any fossils. The reason for this is their environment, which is deep water near volcanic islands; therefore, these sediments are hard to get to, giving these coelacanths an 80 million year gap or ghost lineage. Another ghost lineage was that of the averostran theropods, a ghost lineage now reduced considerably due to the discovery of Tachiraptor.

== Duration and diversification ==
The duration between distinct fossils can be measured and used to derive information about the evolutionary history of a species. A study conducted in 1998 showed that a correlation exists between the diversification of a species and the duration of its ghost lineage; namely that a shorter ghost lineage implies that there will be greater species diversification.

== Genetic evidence ==
Genetic evidence has revealed ghost populations in many species, including modern bonobos and chimpanzees, allopolyploid frogs, polyploid parthenogenetic crayfish, a variety of plants, and humans. A study comparing the genomes of 69 modern bonobos and chimpanzees found between 0.9–4.2% of gene flow from ancient bonobos and an archaic great ape lineage to modern bonobos, allowing researchers to reconstruct 4.8% of this ghost population's genome. Furthermore, previous models for European ancestry suggested that European populations descended from two ancient populations, but genetic evidence now suggests that a third ghost population, the Ancient North Eurasians, has also contributed to European ancestry. There is also a hypothesized ghost hominin whose DNA is found in modern West Africans, much the same way Neanderthal DNA is found in Eurasians. However, unlike Neanderthals in Eurasia, it is more difficult to identify fossil remains in Africa because warmer climates do not preserve ancient DNA as well. Thus the identity of this group (or even whether there was more than one) is difficult to determine, resulting in its ghost status.

== See also ==
- Ghost population, a similar concept in the field of Genetics.
- Lazarus taxon
