= Ghost population =

Inferred statistical population

In genetic research, a "ghost population" refers to a population that has been inferred when analyzing genomes through the use of statistical techniques, yet which has not been adequately associated with a physical specimen.

Researchers may infer "ghost" populations when they identify sections of an individual's genome as displaying "excessively high sequence diversity" compared to the rest of their population, as such variation may reflect the individuals' inheritance of material ultimately sourced from members of "other", notably diverged lineages. However, "ghost" populations may not be so easily identified by contrast within a population when their inputs become common. Recently, a number of scholars have thus argued that analysis of population history can be improved by accounting for scenarios in which "ghost" populations have contributed similar material to various groups, as such analysis may disentangle various otherwise muddied relationships.

Importantly, the term "ghost population" is a functional term used in science and not a prescriptive one: populations are "ghosts" when they are inferred through scientific methods yet not identified with specific remains, and cease to be so if/when such remains are identified. For example, when Hall (2017) responded to Pagani et. al. (2016)'s claim that certain Oceanian populations had ancestry from an unknown "ghost" population, he noted that this ancestry was probably not "ghost" ancestry because it could reasonably be attributed to a branch of Denisovans.

== Background ==
In 2004, it was proposed that maximum likelihood or Bayesian approaches that estimate the migration rates and population sizes using coalescent theory can use datasets that contain a population that has no data. This is referred to as a "ghost population". The manipulation allows exploration in the effects of missing populations on the estimation of population sizes and migration rates between two specific populations. The biases of the inferred population parameters depend on the magnitude of the migration rate from the unknown sister populations. The technique for deriving ghost populations attracted criticism because ghost populations were the result of statistical models, along with their limitations.

== Population genetics ==
=== Humans ===
In 2012, DNA analysis and statistical techniques were used to infer that a now-extinct human population in northern Eurasia had interbred with both the ancestors of Europeans and a Siberian group that later migrated to the Americas. The group was referred to as a ghost population because they were identified by the echoes that they leave in genomes—not by bones or ancient DNA. In 2013, another study found the remains of a member of this ghost group, fulfilling the earlier prediction that they had existed.

According to a study published in 2020, there are indications that 2% to 19% (or about ≃6.6 and ≃7.0%) of the DNA of four West African populations may have come from an unknown archaic hominin that split from the ancestor of Homo Sapiens (Modern Humans) and Neanderthals between 360 kya to 1.02 mya.

The study suggests that Basal West Africans did not split before Neanderthals split from modern humans, and that even before 300,000 BP to 200,000 BP, when the ancestors of the modern San split from other modern sister groups of humans, the group to split the most early from modern humans may have been Basal West Africans.

However, the study also suggests that at least part of this archaic admixture is also present in Eurasians/non-Africans, and that the admixture event or events range from 0 to 124 ka B.P, which includes the period before the Out-of-Africa migration and prior to the African/Eurasian split (thus affecting in part the common ancestors of both Africans and Eurasians/non-Africans). Another study, in 2020, which discovered substantial amounts of previously undescribed human genetic variation, also found ancestral genetic variation in Africans that predates modern humans and was lost in most non-Africans.

In 2026, a new method to discover archaic ancestry via study of the DNA of contemporary humans is being explored by a computational biologist at University of California (Berkeley), Yulin Zhang, and geneticist Arjun Biddanda. Their initial research uses a mathematical model entitled TRACE (Tracking Archaic Contributions via ARG Estimation). All of the populations Zang and her team studied suggest a "ghost" lineage that they estimate separated as a sister population from that of modern humans earlier than 500,000 years ago at approximately the same time as that of the Denisovan and the Neanderthal populations did.

=== Other animals ===
In 2015, a study of the lineage and early migration of the domestic pig found that the best model that fitted the data included gene flow from a ghost population during the Pleistocene that is now extinct.

A 2018 study suggests that the common ancestor of the wolf and the coyote may have interbred with an unknown canid that is related to the dhole.

== See also ==
- Ghost lineage, a similar concept in analysis of fossils.
- Archaeogenetics
- Ancient DNA
