= Tinodontidae =

Tinodontidae Temporal range: Jurassic to Cretaceous, 155–140.2 Ma

Scientific classification
- Kingdom: Animalia
- Phylum: Chordata
- Class: Mammalia
- Clade: Theriiformes
- Family: †Tinodontidae; Marsh, 1887

Genera
- Gobiotheriodon?; Tinodon; Trishulotherium; Yermakia

Extinct family of mammals

Tinodontidae is an extinct family of actively mobile mammals, endemic to what would now be North America, Asia, Europe, and Africa during the Jurassic and Cretaceous periods.

== Taxonomy ==
Tinodontidae was named by Marsh (1887). It was assigned to Mammalia by Marsh (1887); and to Symmetrodonta by McKenna and Bell (1997). More recently, they have been recovered as more basal to symmetrodonts, though still within the mammalian crown-group.
