= Chronoperates =

Chronoperates Temporal range: Late Paleocene, 55 Ma

Scientific classification
- Kingdom: Animalia
- Phylum: Chordata
- Class: Mammalia
- Order: †Symmetrodonta (?)
- Family: †Chronoperatidae; Fox, Youzwyshyn & Krause, 1992
- Genus: †Chronoperates; Fox, Youzwyshyn & Krause, 1992

Type species
- †Chronoperates paradoxus Fox, Youzwyshyn & Krause, 1992

Extinct family of mammals

Chronoperates (meaning "time wanderer" in Greek) is an extinct genus of mammal whose remains have been found in a late Paleocene deposit in Alberta, Canada. It is represented by the type species Chronoperates paradoxus and known only from a partial left lower jaw. It was first identified in 1992 as a non-mammalian cynodont, implying a ghost lineage of over 100 million years since the previously youngest known record of non-mammalian cynodonts, which at that time was in the Jurassic period (some non-mammalian cynodonts are now known to have persisted until the Early Cretaceous). Subsequent authors have challenged this interpretation, particularly as the teeth do not resemble any known non-mammalian cynodonts. Chronoperates is now generally considered to be more likely to be a late-surviving symmetrodont mammal. This would still infer a ghost lineage for symmetrodonts, but a more plausible one, as symmetrodonts persisted into the Late Cretaceous.
