= Ningchengodon =

Ningchengodon Temporal range: Early Cretaceous

Scientific classification
- Kingdom: Animalia
- Phylum: Chordata
- Class: Mammalia
- Order: †Symmetrodonta
- Superfamily: †Spalacotherioidea
- Genus: †Ningchengodon
- Species: †N. foxi

Binomial name
- †Ningchengodon foxi Zhang et al., 2024

Extinct genus of mammals

Ningchengodon is an extinct genus of spalacotherioid known from the single species Ningchengodon foxi that inhabited China during the Early Cretaceous.
