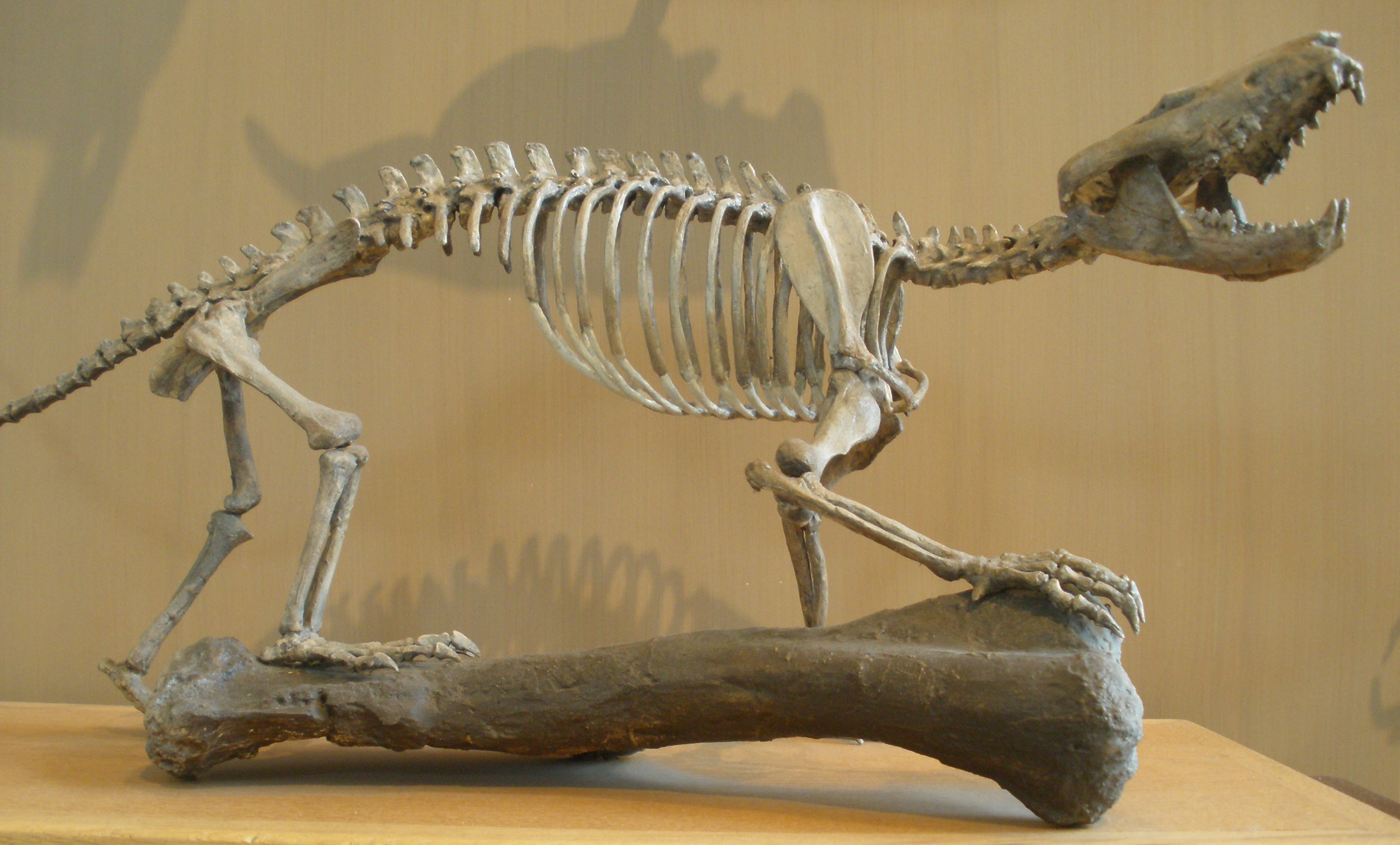
- Skeleton of Gobiconodon ostromi (Eutriconodonta)

Scientific classification
- Kingdom: Animalia
- Phylum: Chordata
- Class: Mammalia
- Clade: Theriimorpha; Rowe, 1993

Subgroups
- †Eutriconodonta; †Fruitafossor?; Theriiformes; †Allotheria (sometimes recovered as stem-mammals); Trechnotheria

= Theriimorpha =

Theriimorpha Temporal range: Toarcian–Present

Clade of mammals

Theriimorpha is a clade of mammals defined as including all mammals more closely related to therians (including placental mammals and marsupials) than to monotremes. Eutriconodonta is usually considered among the most basal members of this group, with other members more closely related to therians like allotherians placed in the subclade Theriiformes, though Eutriconodonta has also been recovered as less closely related to therians than monotremes are in some analyses, placing them outside the crown group of Mammalia, or alternatively more closely related to therian mammals than allotherians and monotremes are.^{supplemental material} The unusual Late Jurassic digging mammal Fruitafossor has also been suggested to be a basal theriimorph in some studies. The position of Allotheria (which contains the multituberculates, among others) within Theriimorpha is controversial. While many studies recover Allotheria within crown Mammalia as more closely related to therians than to monotremes as a member of the clade Theriiformes, some studies recover the group as outside of crown Mammalia.
