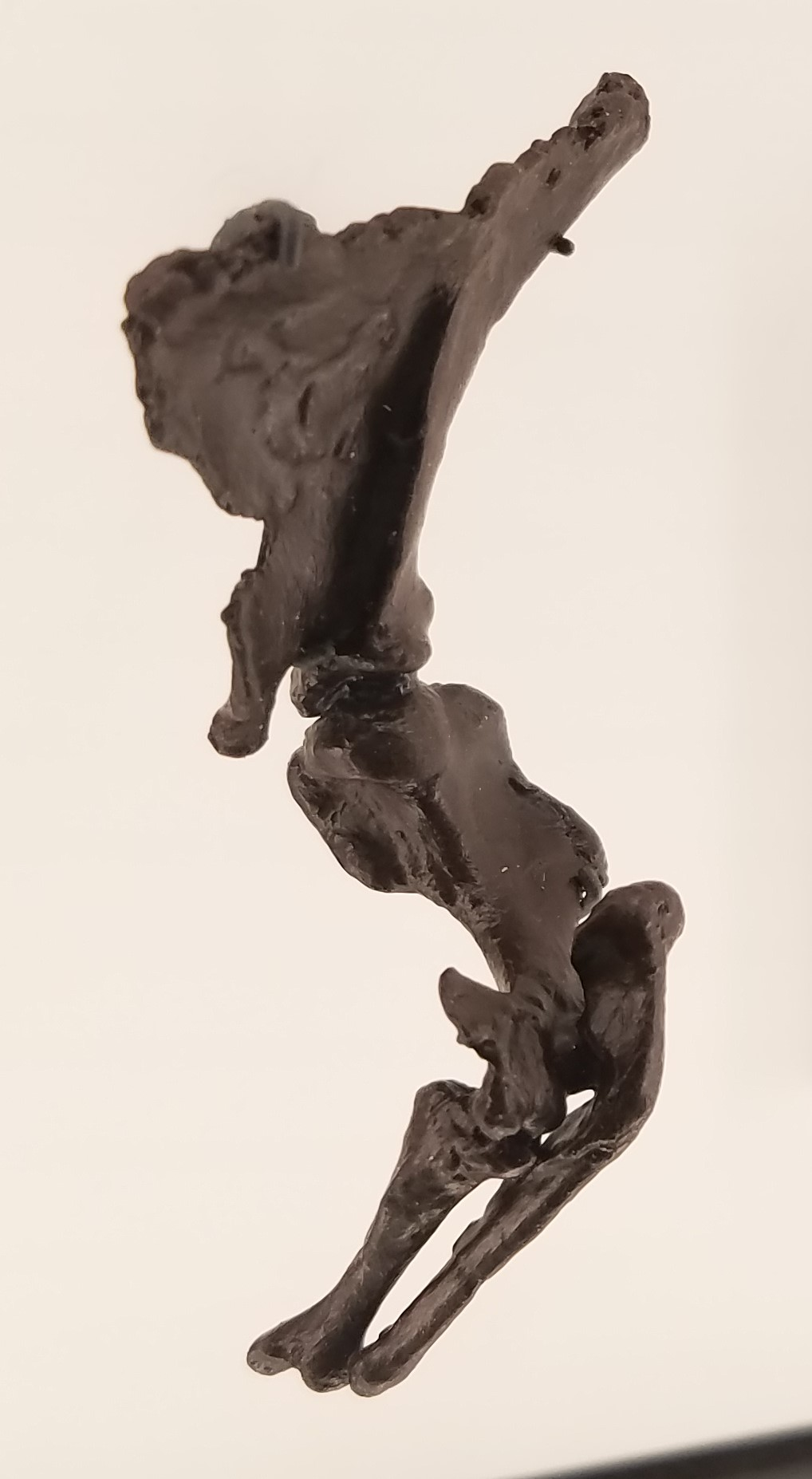
- Forelimb model at the Smithsonian

Scientific classification
- Kingdom: Animalia
- Phylum: Chordata
- Class: Mammalia
- Clade: Theriimorpha
- Genus: †Fruitafossor; Luo and Wible, 2005
- Species: †F. windscheffeli

Binomial name
- †Fruitafossor windscheffeli Luo and Wible, 2005

= Fruitafossor =

Fruitafossor Temporal range: Late Jurassic, Kimmeridgian–Tithonian

Extinct family of mammals

Fruitafossor is an extinct, probably myrmecophagous mammal endemic to North America during the Late Jurassic epoch (around 150 mya).

The description is based on a complete skeleton of a chipmunk-sized animal. It was discovered on March 31, 2005, in Fruita, Colorado. The genus name, Fruitafossor, comes from Fruita, Colorado, where it was discovered. The suffix "fossor" indicates the fossorial, or digging, specialization of the forelimbs. The specific epithet, windscheffeli, is in honor of Wally Windscheffel, who discovered the specimen along with Charles E. Safris of Des Moines, Iowa.

It resembled an armadillo (or anteater) and probably ate colonial insects in much the same manner as these animals do today. Other skeletal features clearly show that Fruitafossor was not related to armadillos, anteaters, or any modern group of mammal. This indicates that specializations associated with feeding on ants or termites have independently evolved many times in mammals: in Fruitafossor, anteaters, numbats, aardwolves, aardvarks, pangolins, and echidnas.

== Description ==
In 2009, a study by J. R. Foster was published that estimated the body masses of mammals from the Late Jurassic Morrison Formation by using the ratio of dentary length to body mass of modern marsupials as a reference. Foster concludes that Fruitafossor was the least massive of the formation at 6 grams, much lower than the average Morrison mammal of 48.5 grams.

=== Description and Ecology ===
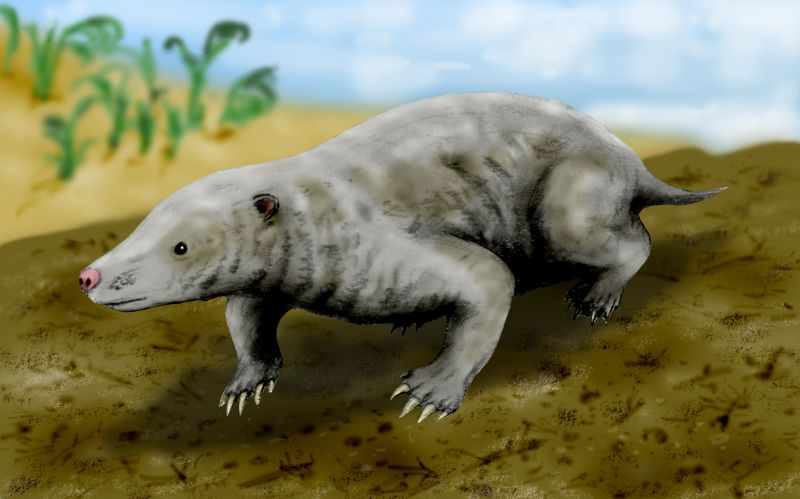
Life restoration

The teeth of Fruitafossor bear a striking resemblance to modern armadillos and aardvarks. They were open-rooted, peg-like teeth without enamel. This type of tooth is present today in insectivorous mammals, particularly those that are highly specialized to feed on colonial insects. This is termed "myrmecophagy". Since ants had not yet evolved at the time of Fruitafossor, it is assumed that these animals fed on termites, which are considered to have evolved in the Jurassic, although some studies consider they appeared in Early Cretaceous instead. Morrison Formation yields fossil of social insect nests, possibly built by termites.

Fruitafossor has been nicknamed Popeye, after the cartoon sailor, because of its large front limbs. The features of the front limb indicate that the animal was fossorial, employing scratch digging like modern moles, gophers, and spiny anteaters. The olecranon process was highly enlarged indicating the forelimb had powerful muscles. This feature also supports the idea that they were myrmecophagous, as modern mammals employ this technique to break into termite mounds.

Its vertebral column is also very similar to armadillos, sloths, and anteaters (Xenarthra). It had extra points of contact among vertebrae similar to the xenarthrous process that are only known in these modern forms. These processes generate a rigid and relatively inflexible backbone, which is good for digging.

This find is an important discovery in mammal evolution, because of where it fits in the evolutionary tree of mammals and because of its ecological niche. Most mammals of the Mesozoic were omnivores or unspecialized insectivores. Fruitafossor is unique in the degree of specialization, both for digging and in regard to how specialized it was on insects. This fossil, along with others such as Repenomamus, Volaticotherium, and Castorocauda, challenge the notion that early mammals and mammaliaforms were restricted to a single niche and demonstrate that at least some early specialization occurred. The eutriconodont Spinolestes may have also occupied a similar ecological niche, and like Fruitafossor it has xenarthrous vertebrae convergent with those of xenarthrans.

== Classification and phylogeny ==
Fruitafossor has no modern relatives. It is an early offshoot of the mammal tree, considered to be a basal branch of Theriimorpha, although a 2018 study recovers Fruitafossor as a stem monotreme.

== See also ==
- Morrison Formation
  - Mammals of the Morrison Formation
