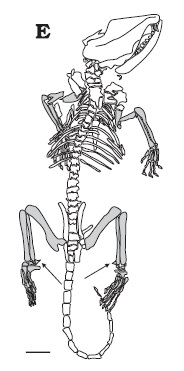
- Maotherium skeleton

Scientific classification
- Kingdom: Animalia
- Phylum: Chordata
- Class: Mammalia
- Order: †Symmetrodonta
- Family: †Zhangheotheriidae
- Genus: †Maotherium; Rougier et al., 2003

Type species
- Maotherium sinensis Rougier et al., 2003

Species
- M. sinensis; M. asiaticus

= Maotherium =

Maotherium Temporal range: Early Cretaceous, 124.6 Ma

Extinct family of mammals

Maotherium is a genus extinct symmetrodont mammal that was discovered in Early Cretaceous rocks in Liaoning Province, China, in 2003. Its scientific name directly translates to "fur beast", in reference to the impressions of fur around the fossil. Maotherium belongs to an extinct group of Mesozoic mammals called symmetrodonts. Though little is known about this group, the symmetrodonts have several similarities - specifically their teeth. They have tall pointed, but simple molars in a triangular arrangement. Originally symmetrodonts were known since the 1920s. Now a vast majority have been restored, such as Zhangheotherium and Akidolestes, during the early 21st century. One of the fossils of Maotherium preserved the imprints of fur, like the mammals Eomaia and Sinodelphys.

A species described in 2009, Maotherium asiaticus, sheds light on the evolution of the mammalian middle ear. In modern mammals, the Meckel's cartilage appears during development but disappears before adulthood. In Maotherium asiaticus, that cartilage not only remained, but turned into bone. This event in evolution may be an example of heterochrony, a change in the timing of development.
