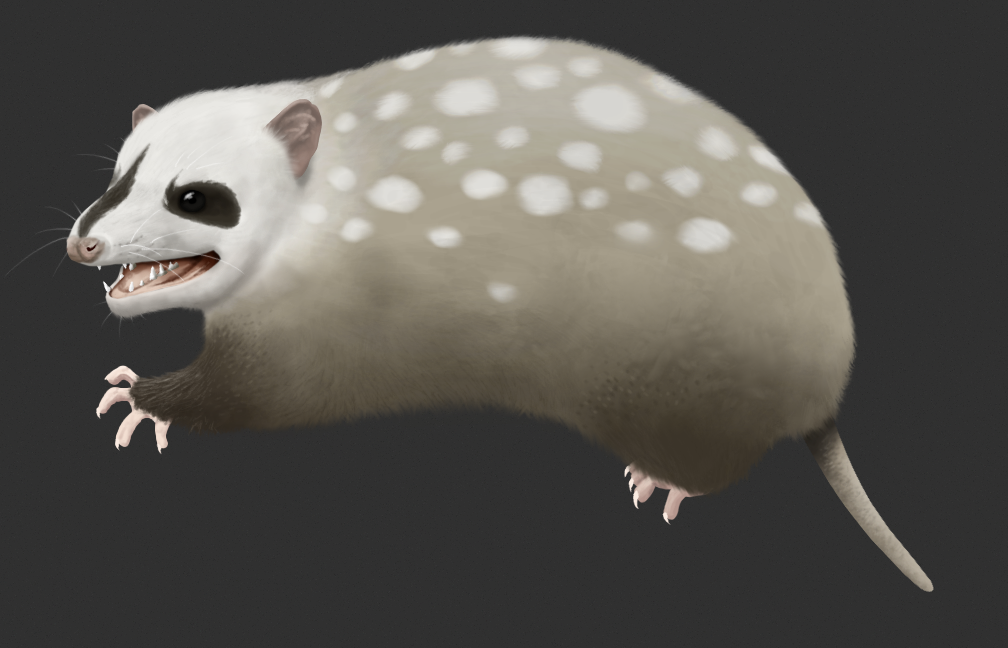
- Restoration of Yaverlestes

Scientific classification
- Domain: Eukaryota
- Kingdom: Animalia
- Phylum: Chordata
- Class: Mammalia
- Order: †Symmetrodonta
- Superfamily: †Spalacotherioidea
- Family: †Spalacotheriidae; Marsh, 1887

Genera
- See text

= Spalacotheriidae =

Spalacotheriidae Temporal range: Early Cretaceous - Late Cretaceous, 145–70 Ma

Extinct family of mammals

Spalacotheriidae is a family of extinct mammals belonging to the paraphyletic group 'Symmetrodonta'. They lasted from the Early Cretaceous to the Campanian in North America, Europe, Asia and North Africa.

Spalacotheriids are characterised by having molar teeth with three molar cusps sitting at acute angles to one another. The shape of their teeth as well as their long lower jaw indicate a carnivorous/insectivorous diet.

A sub-group of Spalacotheriidae, the spalacolestines, lack a Meckelian groove in the jaw, indicating that they had a modern ear anatomy.

== Genera ==
- Akidolestes
- Infernolestes
- Spalacotherium
- Symmetrolestes
- Spalacolestinae
  - Aliaga
  - Heishanlestes
  - Lactodens
  - Shalbaatar
  - Spalacolestes
  - Spalacotheridium
  - Spalacotheroides
  - Symmetrodontoides
  - Yaverlestes
