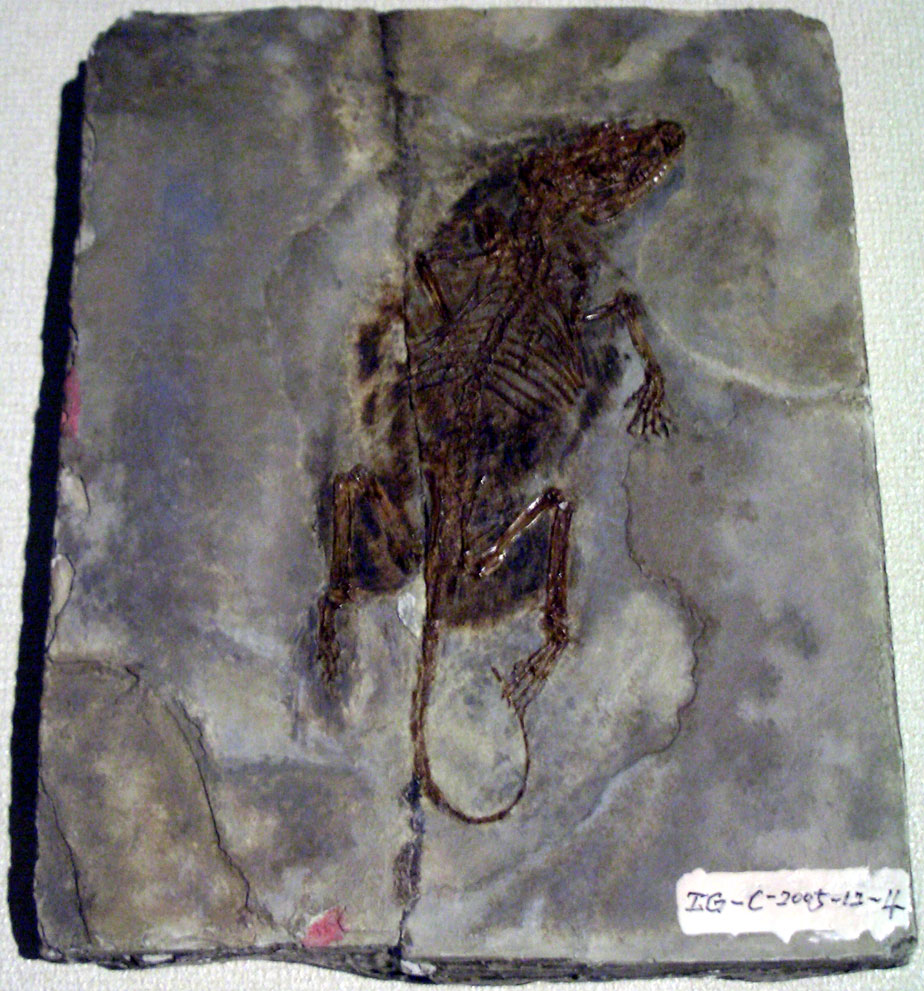
- Zhangheotherium quinquecuspidens

Scientific classification
- Kingdom: Animalia
- Phylum: Chordata
- Class: Mammalia
- Order: †Symmetrodonta
- Superfamily: †Spalacotherioidea
- Family: †Zhangheotheriidae; Rougier, 2003

Genera
- †Anebodon; †Kiyatherium; †Maotherium; †Ningchengodon; †Origolestes; †Zhangheotherium

= Zhangheotheriidae =

Zhangheotheriidae Temporal range: Barremian-Aptian, 129.4–113 Ma

Extinct family of mammals

Zhangheotheriidae is a possibly paraphyletic family of "symmetrodont" mammals that is currently known from Early Cretaceous deposits in China and Russia. Six genera are currently recognized, Anebodon, Kiyatherium, Maotherium, Ningchengodon, Origolestes, and Zhangheotherium.
