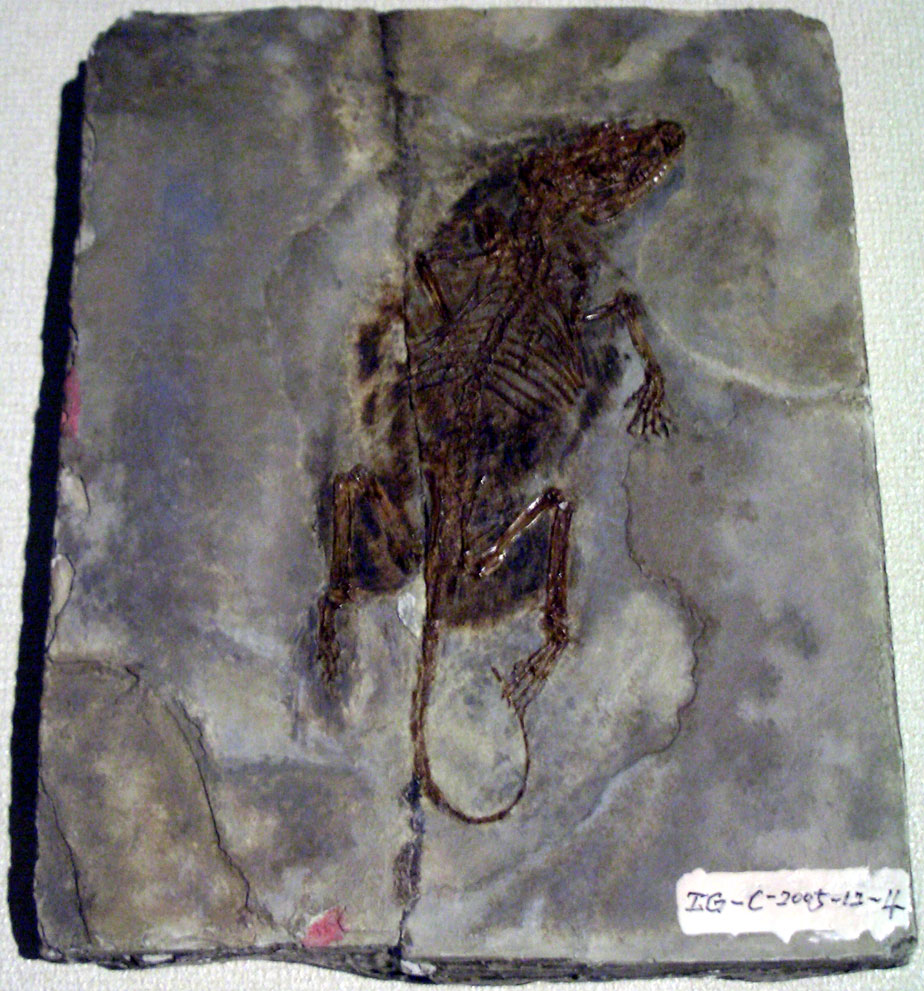
- Fossil specimen, Hong Kong Science Museum

Scientific classification
- Kingdom: Animalia
- Phylum: Chordata
- Class: Mammalia
- Order: †Symmetrodonta
- Family: †Zhangheotheriidae
- Genus: †Zhangheotherium; Hu, Y.Q. Wang, Luo & C.K. Li, 1997

Type species
- †Zhangheotherium quinquecuspidens Hu, Wang, Luo & Li, 1997

= Zhangheotherium =

Zhangheotherium Temporal range: Early Cretaceous, 125 Ma

Extinct family of mammals

Zhangheotherium is an extinct genus of "symmetrodont" mammal from the Early Cretaceous of China. A single species is known, Zhangheotherium quinquecuspidens from Jianshangou Beds of the Yixian Formation. Zhangheotherium was the first "symmetrodont" known from a nearly complete skeleton, expanding knowledge of the group beyond isolated teeth and jaws. The genus name honors Zhang He, who collected the holotype fossil from Liaoning Province prior to its 1997 description. The specific name is Latin for "five-cusped teeth".

"Symmetrodonts" and other archaic mammals such as multituberculates and monotremes are still being debated on their taxonomical relationships. Zhangheotherium provided insight into the evolution of "symmetrodonts", revealing a combination of traits similar to modern therians (such as placentals and marsupials) as well as more "primitive" mammalians. Most likely, "symmetrodonts" are a grade of stem-group therians, with representatives incrementally closer to true therians than to monotremes.

== Description ==
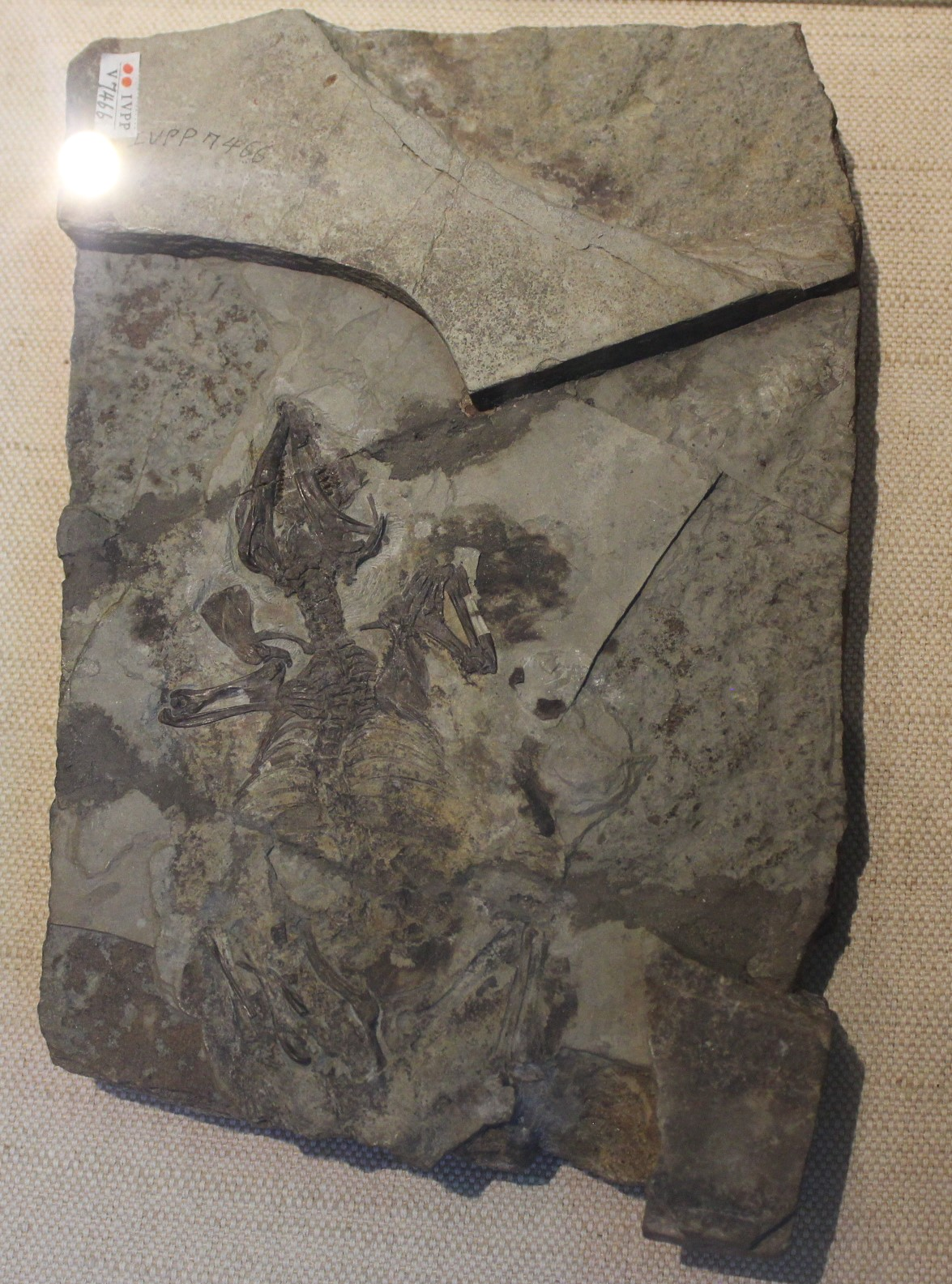
Holotype fossil displayed at the Paleozoological Museum of China

The promontorium of the inner ear is straight and slender, suggesting that the cochlea is uncoiled, in contrast to living mammals. The chest of Zhangheotherium retains a small V-shaped interclavicle, which links the clavicles (collarbones) to the manubrium (upper component of the sternum or breastbone). Monotremes possess a large hourglass-shaped interclavicle while in therians the bone shrinks and fuses with the manubrium during embryonic development. In Zhangheotherium, the clavicles have flexible connections to their neighboring bones, allowing for a greater potential for movement in the scapula (shoulder blade). On the other hand, the humerus (upper arm bone) is more reptilian in form, with a small greater tubercle and underdeveloped trochlea. As a result, Zhangheotherium probably walked in a sprawling manner, like monotremes and some other Early Cretaceous mammals such as Jeholodens and Repenomamus.

Like other "symmetrodonts", each molar tooth of Zhangheotherium consists chiefly of three large pointed cusps set into an acute triangular arrangement. In Zhangheotherium, each molar is supplemented with a pair of minor cusps, bringing the number of cusps up to five. All of the molar cusps are characteristically robust and conical, and lack cristae (ridges bridging between cusps). In addition, the cingulae (horizontal crests at the base of the crown) are underdeveloped in the upper molars and absent in the lower molars. By emphasizing strong interlocking cusps over shearing crests and ridges, the teeth of Zhangheotherium were more specialized than other "symmetrodonts" for the purpose of crushing and grinding food. Nevertheless, Zhangheotherium lacks the grinding talonid "heel" of true therian molars.

== Paleoecology ==
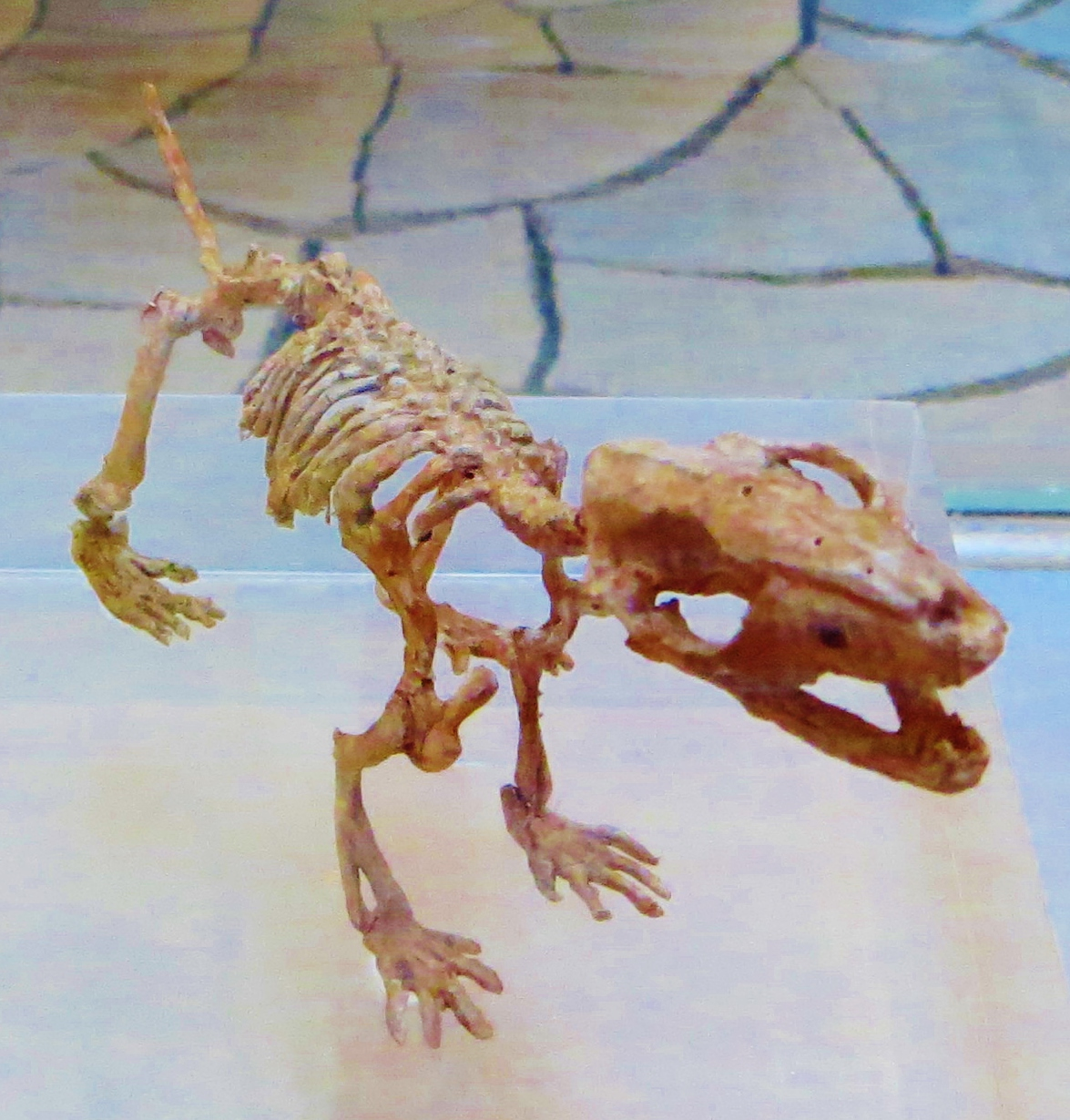
Reconstructed skeleton

Zhangheotherium is one of several extinct mammals reported to bear a spur-like bone in the ankle. This may have had venomous capabilities, similar to the spur seen in males of the modern platypus. A 2015 study argued that Zhangheotherium led a possibly scansorial lifestyle, possessing long hindlimbs and a large plantar area on the foot, both optimal for climbing. A probable tyrannosauroid specimen GMV 2124 (also known as NGMC 2124), previously attributed to Sinosauropteryx, contained two jaws of Zhangheotherium in its stomach region. Thus, it seems to have preyed on this primitive mammal, possibly on a regular basis.
