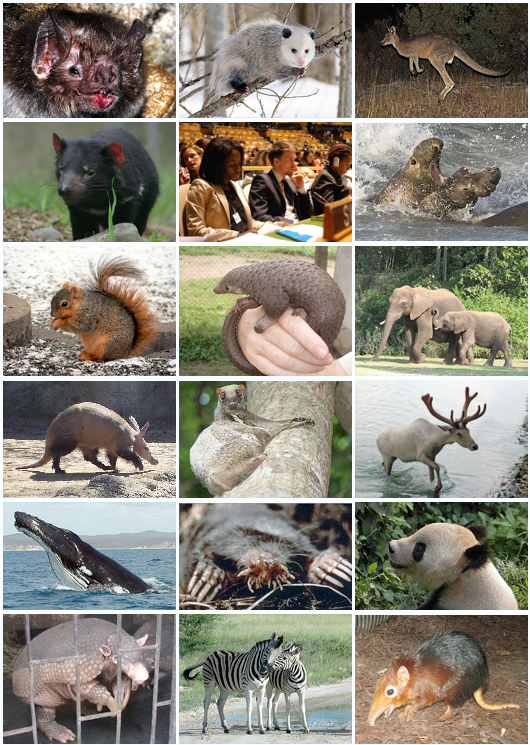

Scientific classification
- Kingdom: Animalia
- Phylum: Chordata
- Class: Mammalia
- Clade: Theriimorpha
- Clade: Theriiformes
- Clade: Trechnotheria
- Clade: Cladotheria
- Clade: Prototribosphenida
- Clade: Zatheria
- Clade: Tribosphenida
- Subclass: Theria; Parker & Haswell, 1897

Subgroups
- Eutheria; Placentalia; Metatheria; Marsupialia; †Juramaia; †Patagomaia; †Spelaeomolitor; †Tingamarra

= Theria =

Theria Temporal range: Late Jurassic–Recent

Subclass of mammals in the clade Theriiformes

Theria (/ˈθɪəriə/ or /ˈθɛriə/; from Ancient Greek θηρίον, thēríon 'wild beast') is a subclass of mammals amongst the Theriiformes. Theria contains the eutherians (which includes placental mammals) and the metatherians (which includes marsupials) but excludes the egg-laying monotremes and various extinct mammals evolving prior to the common ancestor of placentals and marsupials.

== Characteristics ==
Therians give birth to live young without a shelled egg. This is possible thanks to key proteins called syncytins which allow exchanges between the mother and its offspring through a placenta, even rudimental ones such as in marsupials. Genetic studies have suggested a viral origin of syncytins through the retroviral endogenization process, where the genome of a virus was incorporated into the host's DNA.

The marsupials and the placentals evolved from a common therian ancestor that gave live birth by suppressing the mother's immune system. While the marsupials continued to give birth to an underdeveloped fetus after a short pregnancy, the ancestors of placentals gradually evolved a prolonged pregnancy.

The exit openings of the urogenital system and the rectal opening (anus) are separated. The mammary glands lead to the teats. Unlike monotremes, these animals have no coracoid bone.

Pinnae (external ears) are also a distinctive trait that is a therian exclusivity, though some therians, such as the earless seals, have lost them secondarily. The flexible and protruding nose in therians is not found in any other vertebrates, and is the product of modified cells involved in the development of the upper jaw in other tetrapods. Almost all therians have whiskers.

The SRY gene is a protein in therians that helps initiate male sex determination.

== Evolution ==
The earliest known therian mammal fossil is Juramaia, from China's Late Jurassic (Oxfordian stage). However, the age estimates of the site are disputed based on the geological complexity and the geographically widespread nature of the Tiaojishan Formations. Further, King and Beck in 2020 argue for an Early Cretaceous age for Juramaia sinensis, in line with similar early mammaliaformes.

A 2022 review of the Southern Hemisphere Mesozoic mammal fossil record has argued that tribosphenic mammals arose in the Southern Hemisphere during the Early Jurassic, around 50 million years prior to the clade's earliest undisputed appearance in the Northern Hemisphere.

Molecular data suggests that therians may have originated even earlier, during the Early Jurassic. Therian mammals began to diversify 10–20 million years before the dinosaur extinction.

== Taxonomy ==
The rank of "Theria" may vary depending on the classification system used. The textbook classification system by Vaughan et al. (2000) gives the following:

Class Mammalia

- Subclass Theria: live-bearing mammals
  - Infraclass Metatheria: marsupials
  - Infraclass Eutheria: placentals

In the above system, Theria is a subclass. Alternatively, in the system proposed by McKenna and Bell (1997) it is ranked as a supercohort under the subclass Theriiformes:

Class Mammalia

- Subclass Theriiformes: live-bearing mammals and their prehistoric relatives
  - Infraclass Holotheria: modern live-bearing mammals and their prehistoric relatives
    - Legion Cladotheria
      - Sublegion Zatheria
        - Infralegion Tribosphenida
          - Supercohort Theria: therian mammals
            - Cohort Marsupialia: marsupials
            - Cohort Placentalia: placentals

Another classification proposed by Luo et al. (2002) does not assign any rank to the taxonomic levels, but uses a purely cladistic system instead.

== See also ==
- Marsupionta
- Monotremes
