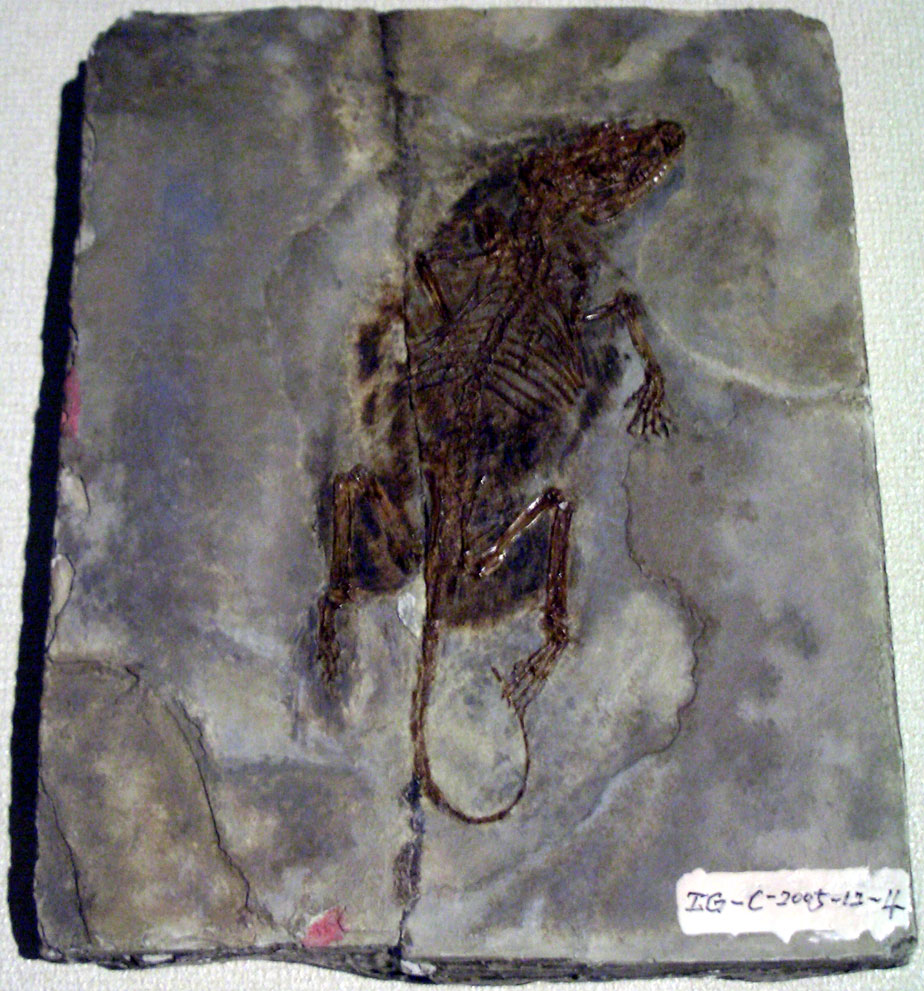
- Fossil specimen of Zhangheotherium quinquecuspidens

Scientific classification
- Kingdom: Animalia
- Phylum: Chordata
- Class: Mammalia
- Clade: Trechnotheria
- Order: †Symmetrodonta

Subgroups
- †?Chronoperates; †Spalacotheriidae; †Zhangheotheriidae

= Symmetrodonta =

Symmetrodonta Temporal range: Early Cretaceous–Campanian Possible Paleocene ghost lineage

Extinct order of mammals

Symmetrodonta is a group of Mesozoic mammals and mammal-like synapsids characterized by the triangular aspect of the molars when viewed from above, and the absence of a well-developed talonid. The traditional group of 'symmetrodonts' ranges in age from the latest Triassic to the Late Cretaceous, but most research in the last 20-30 years has concluded that they are not a true taxonomic group, but include several unrelated branches of the mammal tree. Despite this, the name is still used informally by some researchers for convenience, usually restricted to the spalacotheriids and zhangheotheriids.

There are some symmetrodonts with acutely-triangulated molar cusps ("acute-angled symmetrodonts") that seem to form a true monophyletic group, and lasted from the Early Cretaceous to the Campanian, although Zhangheotheriidae might be paraphyletic in relation to other forms. Chronoperates has been suggested to be a late surviving representative of this clade, offering a ghost lineage extending to the late Paleocene; however, no recent phylogenetic studies have incorporated it.

Particular sub−groups of Symmetrodonta are better studied, e.g. Spalacotheriidae, which has acute−angled molariform teeth, strongly reduced talonids, and conspicuous anterior and posterior cingulids.

== Biology ==
Though some forms like Zhangheotherium retain a Meckelian groove, at least Spalacotheriinae lost it, acquiring modern ear anatomy. Their deciduous canines and premolars as well as long lower jaw indicate a carnivorous/insectivorous diet.

Zhangheotherium was specialised to a tree-dwelling lifestyle. It shows evidence of tarsal spurs, indicating that, like most non-therian Mammaliaformes, at least some symmetrodonts were venomous like the modern platypus.

One species, Spalacotheridium noblei, is notable for its small size. It is one of the smallest known mammals. Each individual molar is little more than 0.25 mm across.

== See also ==
- Evolution of mammals
