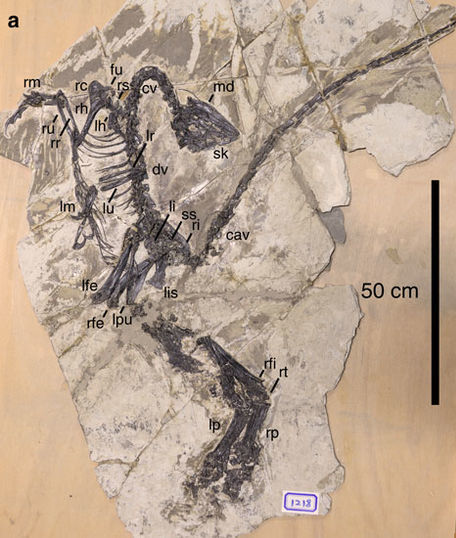
- Type specimen of J. tengi

Scientific classification
- Kingdom: Animalia
- Phylum: Chordata
- Clade: Dinosauria
- Clade: Saurischia
- Clade: Theropoda
- Family: †Troodontidae
- Genus: †Jianianhualong; Xu et al., 2017

Type species
- Jianianhualong tengi Xu et al., 2017

= Jianianhualong =

Jianianhualong Temporal range: Aptian, 124.4 Ma

Extinct genus of dinosaurs

Jianianhualong (meaning "Jianianhua dragon") is a genus of troodontid theropod dinosaur from the Early Cretaceous of China. It contains a single species, Jianianhualong tengi, named in 2017 by Xu Xing and colleagues based on an articulated skeleton preserving feathers. The feathers at the middle of the tail of Jianianhualong are asymmetric, being the first record of asymmetrical feathers among the troodontids. Despite aerodynamic differences from the flight feathers of modern birds, the feathers in the tail vane of Jianianhualong could have functioned in drag reduction whilst the animal was moving. The discovery of Jianianhualong supports the notion that asymmetrical feathers appeared early in the evolutionary history of the Paraves.

Jianianhualong possesses a combination of traits seen in basal as well as traits seen in derived troodontids. This is consistent with its phylogenetically intermediate position among the troodontids. This mixture of traits shows a distinct spatial organization, with basal traits being present in the forelimbs and pelvis, and derived traits being present in the skull and hindlimbs. This may represent a case of mosaic evolution, where natural selection acts upon the form of the body in a modular way. Similar transitional patterns of traits are seen in the troodontid Sinusonasus, a close relative of Jianianhualong. Ecologically speaking, Jianianhualong and Sinusonasus are part of the considerable diversity of troodontids that is present within the Yixian Formation.

== Discovery and naming ==
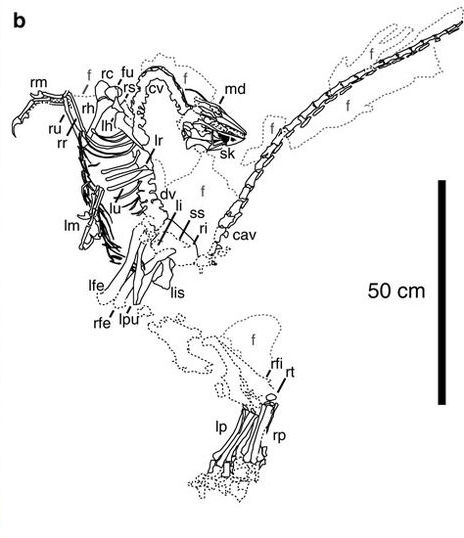
Line drawing of the type specimen

Jianianhualong is known from the type and only specimen, a nearly complete skeleton preserving feathers that is missing only the end of the tail. It is articulated and compressed on a stone plate. This holotype specimen is stored under the collection number DLXH 1218 in the Dalian Xinghai Museum, Liaoning Province, China. It was excavated using mechanical tools (geologist's hammers and chisels) from Early Cretaceous rocks of the Yixian Formation in the locality of Baicai Gou (Chinese: 白菜溝), located in the Yixian County of Liaoning. The Dakangpu Bed (equivalent to the Dawangzhangzi, Daxinfangzi, Hejiaxin, Sichakou, and Senjiru Beds), which Baicai Gou is a part of, is situated in the middle of the formation. The specific portion of the Beds from which Jianianhualong originates was dated in 2006 and 2008 to approximately 124.4 million years ago, which corresponds to the early Aptian.

In 2017, Jianianhualong was named and described by a team of researchers including Xu Xing, Philip J. Currie, Michael Pittman, Xing Lida, Meng Qingjin, Lü Junchang, Hu Dongyu, and Yu Congyu, in a research paper published in Nature Communications. In order to investigate the preserved plumage of the specimen, Xu and colleagues made use of laser-stimulated fluorescence using a 405 nm laser. The genus name combines the name of a company that sponsored the research of this taxon, Jianianhua (Chinese: 嘉年華), and the suffix long (Chinese: 龍), meaning "dragon". The specific name, tengi, honours Ms. Teng Fangfang who acquired the specimen and made it available for study.

== Description ==
The type specimen of Jianianhualong measures approximately 1 metre (3 ft 3 in) as preserved; since the back of the tail is missing, the animal would probably have been around 1.12 metres (3 ft 8 in) long in life. Scaling from a femoral length of 11.7 cm (4.6 in), Xu et al. found that it weighed 2.4 kilograms (5.3 lb). Despite its small size, the specimen was mature, as indicated by the fusion of the sutures in the vertebrae.

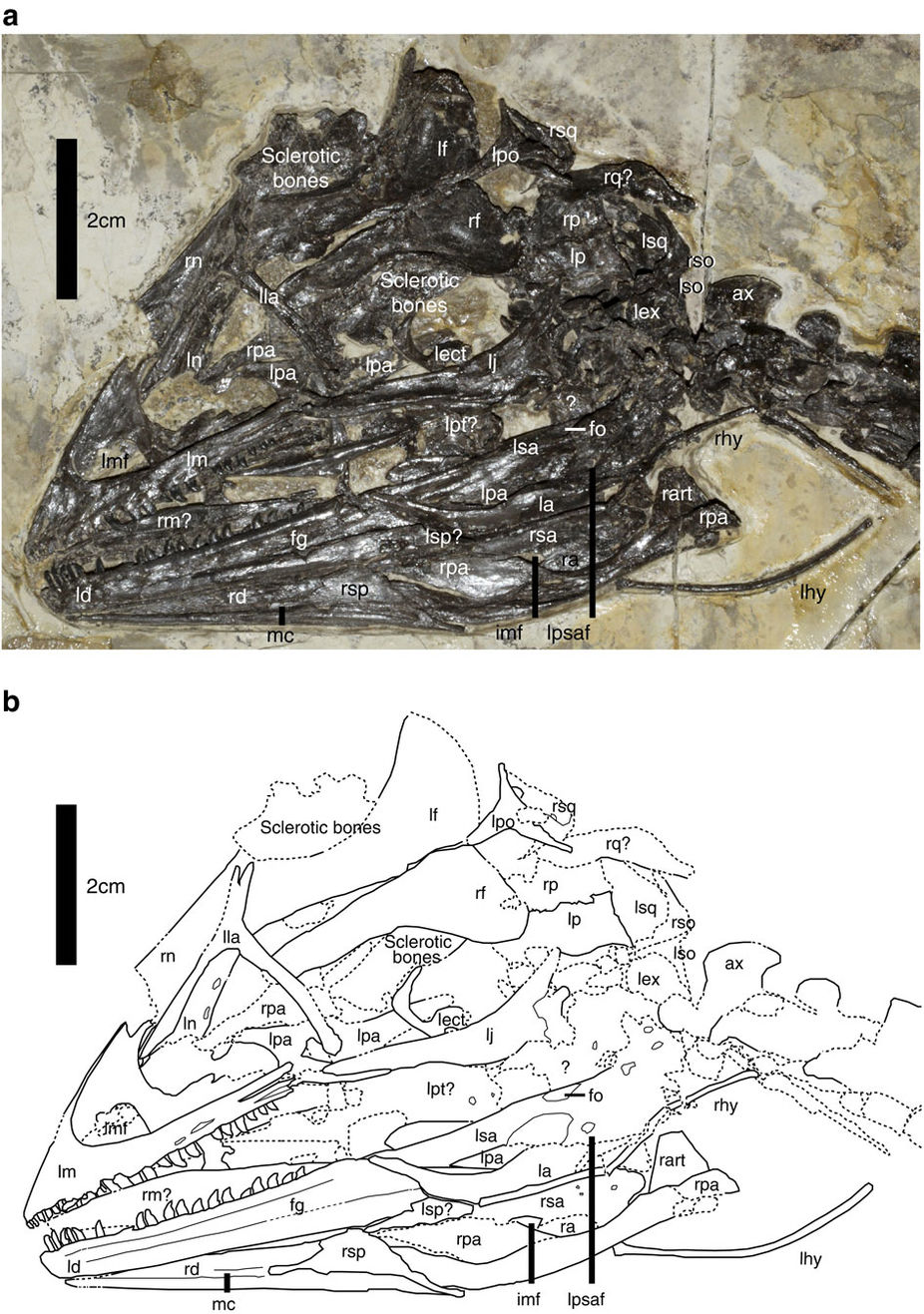
Skull of J. tengi as preserved

=== Skull ===
The skull of Jianianhualong is small and sub-triangular, with a short snout and a wide skull roof like Mei.The frontmost-preserved bone of the snout is the maxilla, the main body of which is taller than long. This contrasts Jianianhualong from all other members of the Troodontidae, along with the top margin of the bone forming a large angle of 45° with the bottom margin. The rear branch of the bone is also deep, like derived troodontids but unlike Sinovenator.

Behind the maxilla, the indentation known as the antorbital fossa bears two large openings (the antorbital fenestra and the elongated, enlarged maxillary fenestra) that stretch from the top margin to the bottom margin of the fossa; Sinovenator, Sinornithoides, and Sinusonasus have one additional opening known as the promaxillary opening. The bar of bone separating the fenestrae is narrow, like in Sinovenator.

The lacrimal bone, encircling the fossa from above and behind, has a long forward-projecting branch much like other troodontids. However, the descending branch of the bone is also nearly the same length, and the descending branch also bears a unique ridge on its front portion. The nasal bone is short and broad like Mei. The inner surface of the frontal suggests details about the braincase, including the widened olfactory tract and back of the cerebrum. Compared to Sinovenator, the forward branch of the postorbital bone is not as long.

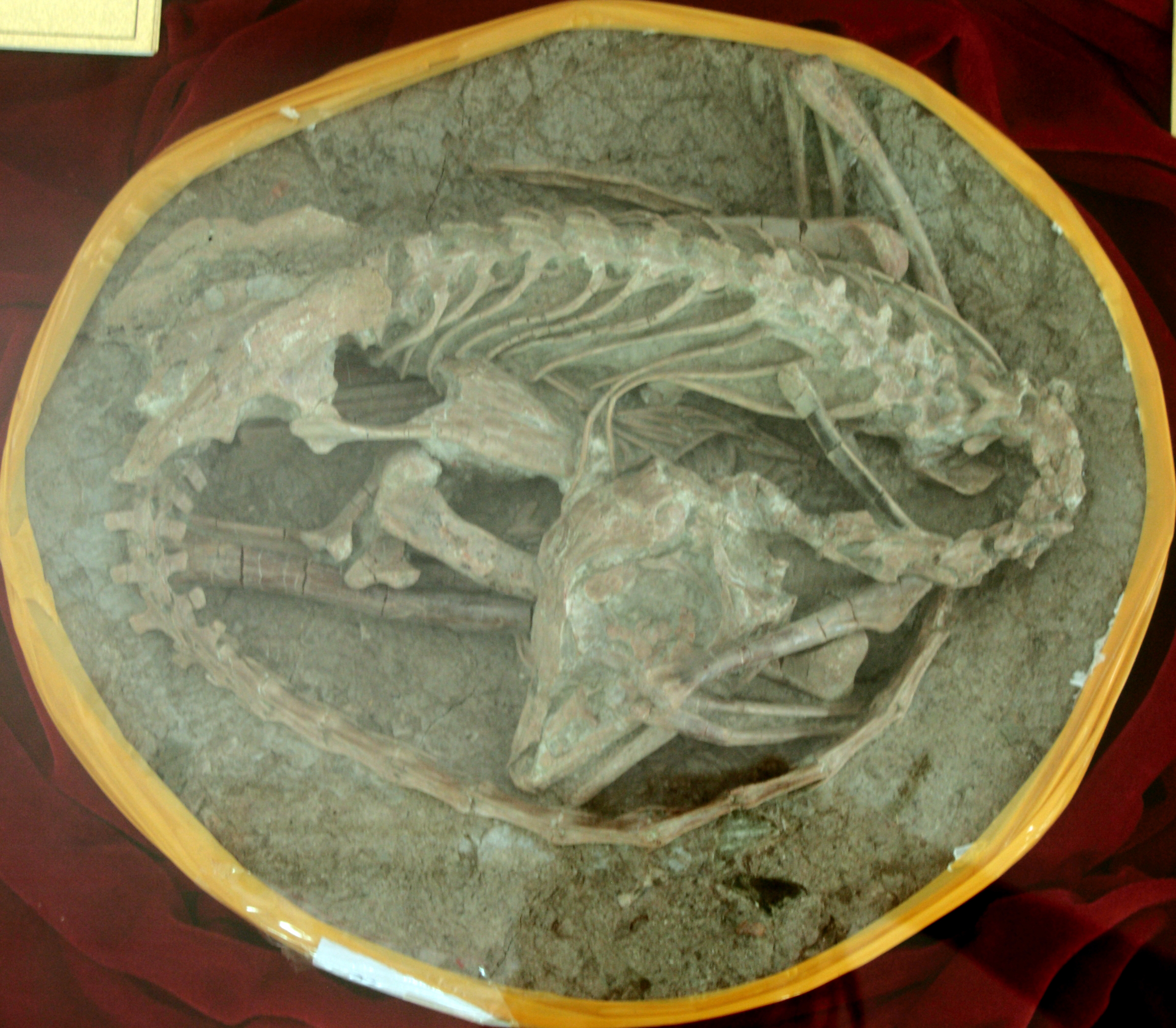
Fossilized skeleton of Mei long, showing the subtriangular skull

Overall, the lower jaw is subtriangular when viewed from the side, with a straight top margin and a curved bottom margin; it is not downturned, unlike Sinovenator. The dentary bone is long (occupying half of the jaw's length), shallow, and triangular, and it bears a groove that widens towards the back of the bone. A distinct fossa on the top surface of the surangular bone separates Jianianhualong from other troodontids. The angular bone projects upwards behind the dentary, like Sinovenator and various other members of the Deinonychosauria.

The maxilla of Jianianhualong bore 21 teeth on each side, while the dentary bore 25 on each side. Like other troodontids, the teeth are short-crowned, strongly recurved, and unevenly distributed. The teeth at the front of the jaws are more closely packed than the rear teeth, which also have fine serrations on their rear edges. These serrations are fine, as in Sinovenator, instead of robust as in derived troodontids. Unusually, the first several teeth in the dentary appear to be angled forwards, or procumbent. This condition is present in several contemporary dromaeosaurids.

=== Axial skeleton ===
The vertebral column of Jianianhualong is nearly complete. However, individual vertebrae are not always possible to discern. The neck (i.e. the cervical vertebrae) is 16 cm (6.3 in) long, the torso (i.e. the dorsal vertebrae) is 17 cm (6.7 in) long, and the tail (i.e. the caudal vertebrae) is 54 cm (21 in) long. Overall, there may have been 31 caudal vertebrae in total.

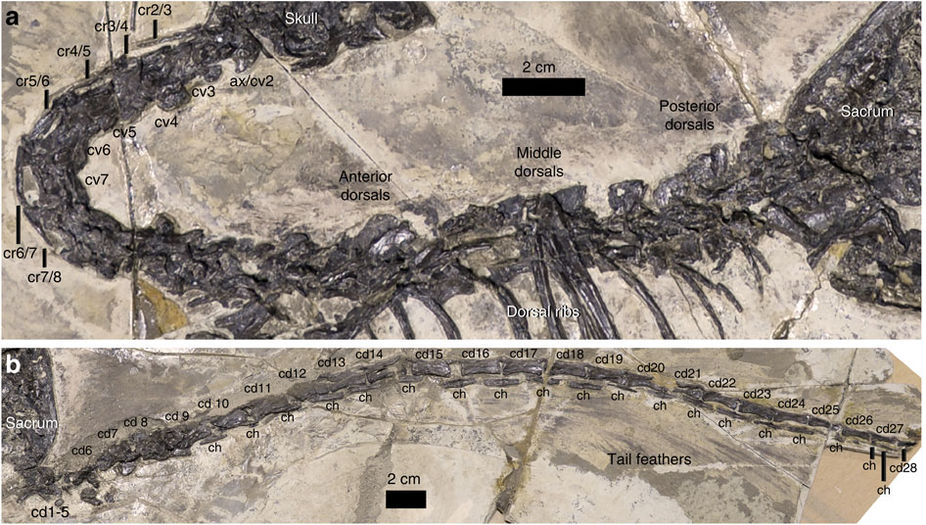
Neck, torso (a), and tail (b) of J. tengi

Uniquely among troodontids, the neural spine of the axis, the second cervical vertebra, has a convex top margin. Also uniquely, the front rim of the neural spine is thickened, while the rear portion is strongly expanded at the top. The length of the cervicals increases until the fifth to seventh cervicals, which have the greatest length. Further back, the remaining cervicals are significantly shorter. The front also dorsal vertebrae are relatively short, with the middle and back dorsals being longer. The dorsal ribs lack uncinate process, and the sternum is also unossified, like other troodontids. Like other theropods, the first pair of the gastralia near the front of the torso is noticeably more robust, particularly in the central portion.

Similar to other paravians, the caudal vertebrae of Jianianhualong become increasingly longer towards the back of the tail; for instance, the fifteenth caudal is about twice as long as the sixth. From the twenty-third caudal backwards, the sides of the caudals become compressed such that they are sub-triangular. Towards the back of the tail, the forward and rear projections of the chevrons are roughly equal in length. Unlike Sinusonasus, where chevrons come into contact with each other, there are gaps between the chevrons of Jianianhualong.

=== Limbs ===
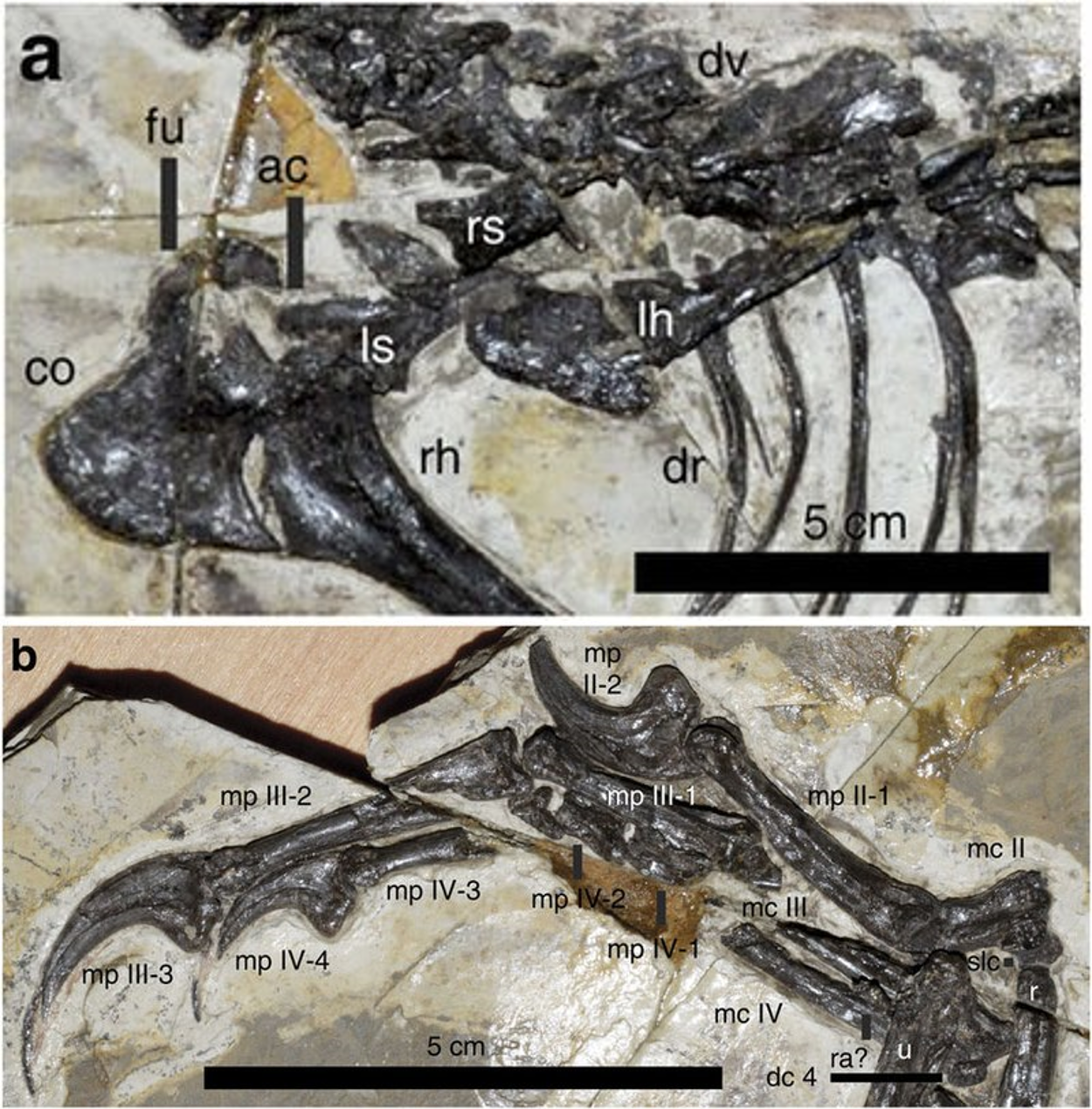
Shoulder (a) and hand (b) of J. tengi

The bottom of the large, four-sided coracoid extends backwards with a hook-like projection, the postglenoid process, which is similar in length to that of Sinornithoides but longer than that of Sinovenator. Unlike Sinornithoides but like Mei, the furcula in Jianianhualong is robust, flattened, and U-shaped like that of Mei. Like derived troodontids, the slender humerus is shorter than the femur. The ulna exhibits a slight backward bow; Mei has a much stronger bow, while the bow is absent in most other troodontids altogether. Contrary to most other theropods, the top portion of the radius bears a backwards bow similar to that of the ulna.

The hand bears three digits, typical of the Maniraptora, which respectively bear 2, 3, and 4 phalanges. The overall length of the hand is 112 mm (4.4 in). Several distinguishing characteristics of Jianianhualong are found among the phalanges. The first phalanx of the first digit is unusually long; it bears a "heel" at its top end, as well as a large groove on the interior surface that extends for more than half the bone's length. Additionally, the second phalanx of the second digit is also very long, being longer than the metacarpal of the corresponding digit. The claws are highly robust, with their bases being at least half as wide as their overall length; the claw of the first digit is the largest.

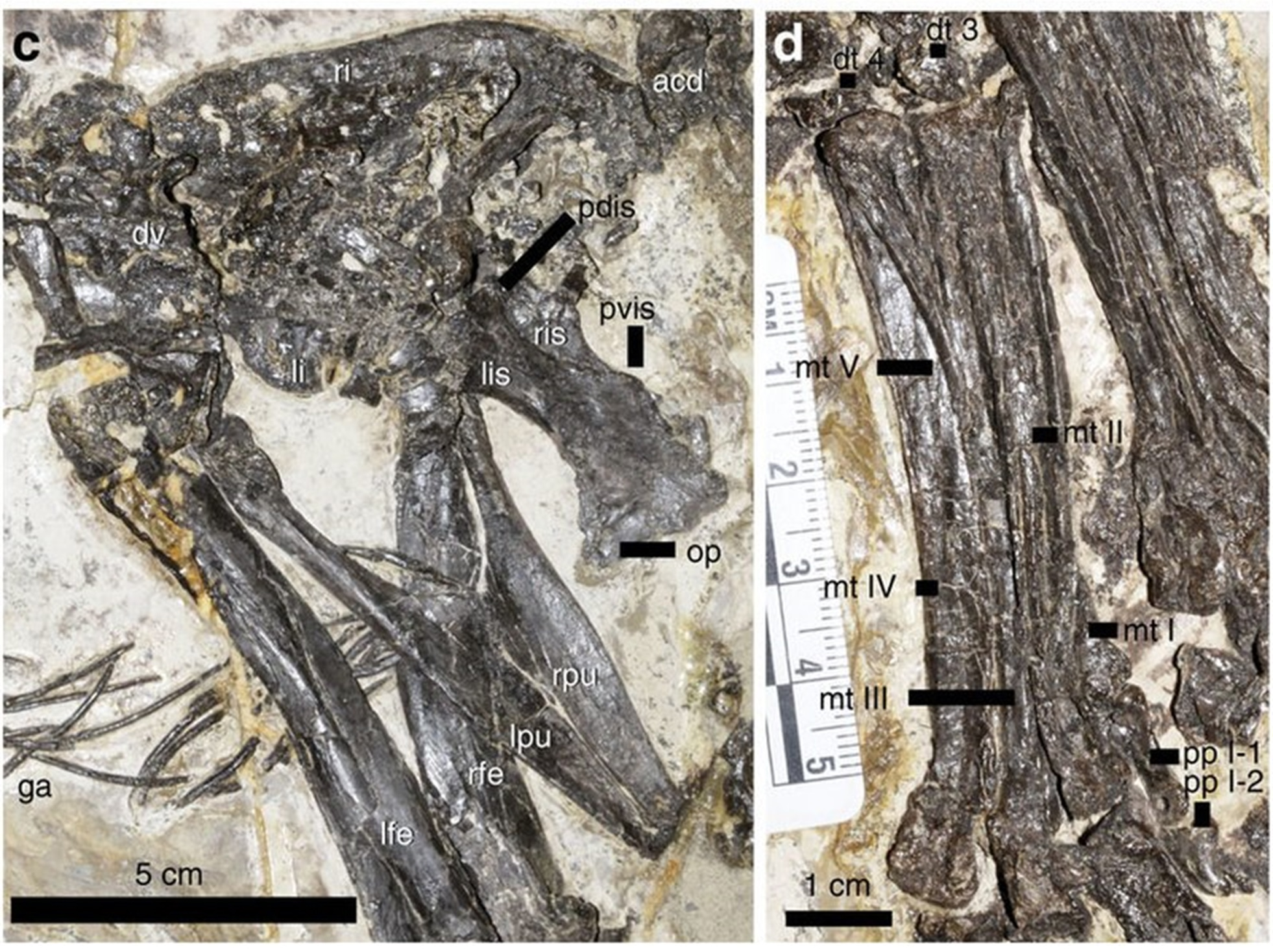
Pelvis (c) and foot (d) of J. tengi

The pelvis of Jianianhualong is overall similar to that of Sinovenator. Like Archaeopteryx and basal dromaeosaurids, the ilium is small. A distinguishing trait is that the top margin of the ilium is slightly concave. Below the ilium, the left and right pubes are conjoined into the unusually broad "pubic apron" that is characteristic of troodontids, with a ridge on the rear surface as in Sinovenator. Behind the pubes, the forward-projecting obturator process of the ischium is located near the bottom of the bone. There is a small recess, or lamina, on the margin of the process, another distinguishing trait of Jianianhualong.

Among the four metatarsal bones, the second is the shortest and most slender after the first (corresponding to the hallux). The third metatarsal is shorter relative to the femur than that of Sinovenator. Unlike other troodontids, the bottom end of the second metatarsal lacks a hinge joint, and a flange on the bottom of metatarsal IV is also missing. The latter is a distinguishing characteristic. Further below, like derived troodontids and dromaeosaurids, the "sickle claw" of the second digit is strongly curved and bears a prominent flexor tubercle (the portion which articulates with the phalanx). It is also much larger than the other phalanges in the digit; it is longer than the first phalanx, whereas they have the same length in Sinovenator.

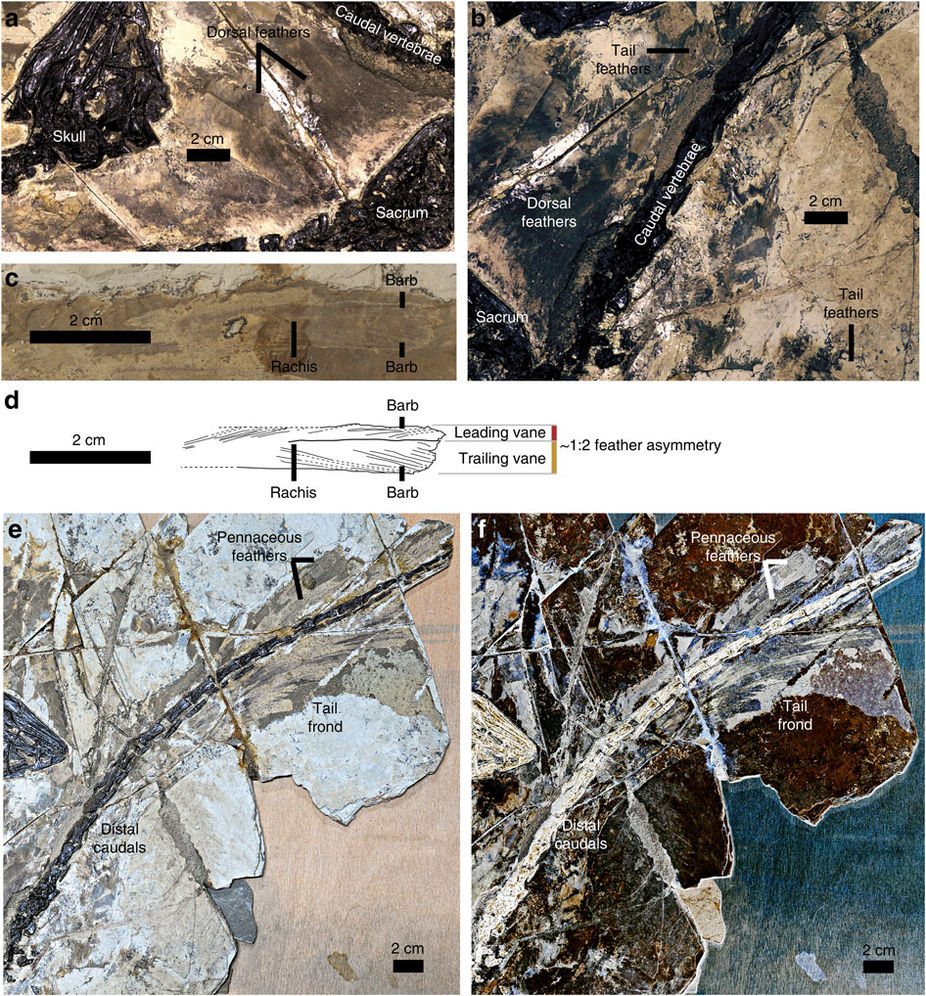
Feathers of J. tengi as preserved on the back (a) and base of the tail (b); photograph (c) and diagram (d) of an asymmetrical feather; photographs (e, f) of the tail frond

=== Feathering ===
Feathers are preserved alongside the entire vertebral column of Jianianhualong. On the bottom of the neck, feathers are preserved with a length of at least 30 mm (1.2 in). Those along the back and over the hip are longer, with a length of about 75 mm (3.0 in). Behind the tibia, there are also some feathers measuring 70 mm (2.8 in) in length. Additionally, some poorly preserved feathers are associated with the humerus and ulna, having an unknown length.

Like Jinfengopteryx, Anchiornis, and Archaeopteryx, the tail of Jianianhualong supports a frond-like fan of pennaceous feathers along its entire length. Unlike Archaeopteryx and potentially Jinfengopteryx, the feathers are curved. Feathers from the middle of the tail are 120 mm (4.7 in) long. At least some of the long pennaceous feathers lining the tail are asymmetric; one feather has a trailing (hind) vane that is about twice as wide as the leading (front) vane, with the barbs being respectively at angles of 10° and 15° for the two vanes.

== Classification ==
A number of characteristics allow Jianianhualong to be identified as a member of the Troodontidae. These include the long forward-projecting branch and flange of the lacrimal bone; the foramina on the nasal bone; the smooth transition between the eye socket and the backward-projecting branch of the frontal bone; the ridge on the forward-projecting branch of the jugal bone; the triangular dentary bearing a widening groove; the robust forward-projecting branch of the surangular bone; the relatively large number of unevenly-distributed teeth; the flattened chevrons with blunt forward projections and bifurcated backward projections; and the broad and flat "pubic apron" formed by the pubic bones.

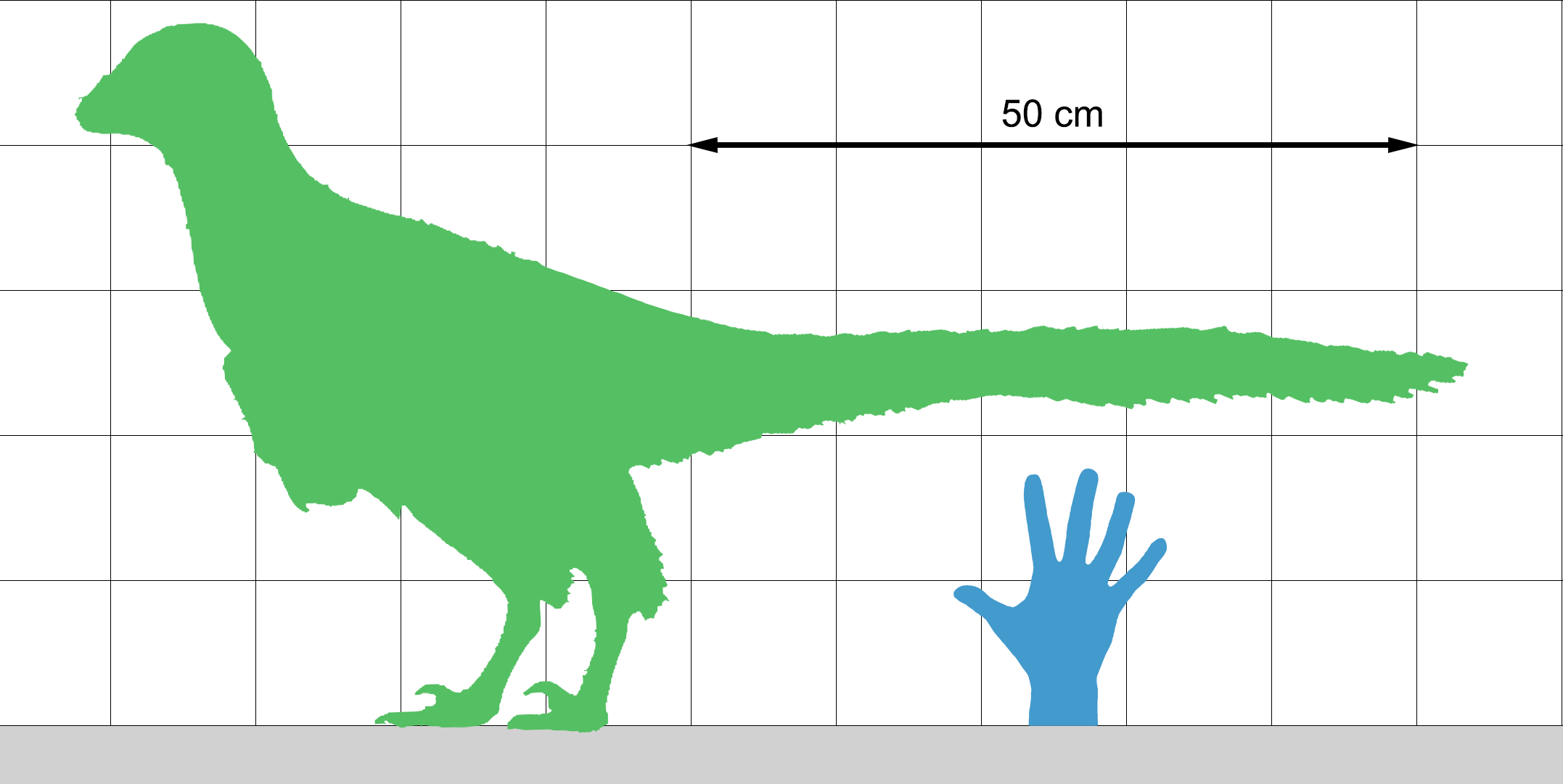
Size of Jianianhualong compared to human hand

Within the troodontids, Jianianhualong displays a unique combination of characteristics from both basal ("unspecialized") and derived ("specialized") troodontids, organized in distinct regions of its body. The forelimbs and pelvis largely resemble basal troodontids such as Sinovenator: the short deltopectoral crest on the humerus; the long hand, metacarpal II, and phalanx III-2 on the hand; the small ilium; the ridge on the pubic apron; and the short ischium with two projections and an obturator process near the bottom of the bone. At the same time, the skull and hindlimbs resemble derived troodontids: the deep jugal branch of the maxilla bearing a prominent groove, the sub-triangular antorbital fossa; the relatively long maxillary fenestra; the short jugal branch of the postorbital bone; the long hallux; the slender and short metatarsal II; the "heel" on phalanx II-2; and the large, curved sickle claw. Sinusonasus exhibits a similar condition: the skull is like those of basal troodontids, and the pelvis and hindlimb are like those of derived troodontids. In a phylogenetic analysis, Xu and colleagues found Jianianhualong in a polytomy with Sinusonasus and several other intermediate troodontids.

For their 2019 description of Hesperornithoides, Scott Hartman and colleagues added Jianianhualong to an expanded and updated version of the phylogenetic dataset that was used for the analysis of Xu and colleagues. They found it as a member of the Sinovenatorinae, a group that was named in 2017 by Caizhi Shen and colleagues in their description of Daliansaurus. However, Hartman and colleagues noted that a position similar to that found by Xu and colleagues was also plausible: forcing Jianianhualong to be closer to the more derived Troodontinae required a phylogenetic tree that was only one step longer, and thus marginally less likely according to the principle of maximum parsimony.

The strict consensus phylogenetic tree recovered by Xu and colleagues is reproduced below at left. The partially expanded strict consensus tree recovered by Hartman and colleagues is reproduced below at right (note that Troodontinae includes Troodon, Saurornithoides, and Zanabazar).

Topology A: Xu et al. (2017)

- Paraves
  - Scansoriopterygidae Symmetrical tail, wing unknown
  - Avialae Asymmetrical wing & tail
  - - Wellnhoferia grandis
    - Archaeopteryx lithographica Asymmetrical wing & tail
    - - Xiaotingia zhengi
      - Anchiornis huxleyi Symmetrical wing, tail unknown
    - Dromaeosauridae Asymmetrical wing & tail
    - Troodontidae
      - Mei long
      - - Sinovenator changii
        - - Sinusonasus magnodens
          - Jianianhualong tengi Asymmetrical tail,
            wing unknown
          - SPS 100/44 ("EK troodontid")
          - Sinornithoides youngi
          - Byronosaurus jaffei
          - - Zanabazar junior
            - Saurornithoides mongoliensis
            - Troodon formosus

Topology B: Hartman et al. (2019)

- Paraves
  - Avialae (incl. Scansoriopterygidae)
  - - Archaeopterygidae
    - - - Halszkaraptorinae
        - Unenlagiinae
      - - Dromaeosauridae
        - Troodontidae
          - Sinovenatorinae
            - Mei long
            - - Xiaotingia zhengi
              - - Sinovenator changii
                - Jianianhualong tengi
          - - Almas ukhaa
            - Liaoningvenator curriei
            - - - Daliansaurus liaoningensis
                - - Hesperornithoides miessleri
                  - Sinusonasus magnodens
                - - - Byronosaurus jaffei
                    - Sinornithoides youngi
                  - - Gobivenator mongoliensis
                    - - Geminiraptor suarezarum
                      - Urbacodon itemirensis
                      - Troodontinae

=== Implications for troodontid evolution ===
The conjunction of basal and derived features as distinct regions of the body in Jianianhualong and Sinusonasus represent a possible case of mosaic evolution, in which natural selection acts upon distinct "modules" of the body. Indeed, the pattern in which basal and derived features are present seems to follow the domains of the body that are regulated by Hox genes, which have previously been discussed in the context of pterosaurs such as Darwinopterus. However, this hypothesis is weakened by the presence of characteristics in both troodontids that do not follow the pattern. In Jianianhualong, for instance, the large antorbital fenestra, long tooth row of the maxilla, and finely-serrated teeth represent basal characteristics in an otherwise derived skull. Similarly, digit II of the foot in Sinusonasus is not as specialized as those of derived troodontids, despite the hindlimb being overall derived. Conversely, the forelimb of Jianianhualong is short overall as in derived troodontids, despite the presence of basal traits.

An ancestral state reconstruction conducted along with the phylogenetic analysis (results labelled in the above phylogenetic tree) suggests that wing feather asymmetry evolved only once, at the last common ancestor of the Paraves. Asymmetrical tail feathers would then also have evolved once, at the common ancestor of all paravians excluding scansoriopterygids and avialans. However, given the uncertainty of whether dromaeosaurids possessed asymmetrical wing feathers, the support for a single emergence of asymmetrical wing feathers in the common ancestor of the Paraves is equivocal, the alternative scenario that it evolved twice being plausible. The distinct possibility thus remains that troodontids had asymmetrical tail feathers but symmetrical arm feathers, suggesting that asymmetry in the tail appeared first, but this is not supported by the ancestral state reconstruction.

== Paleobiology ==
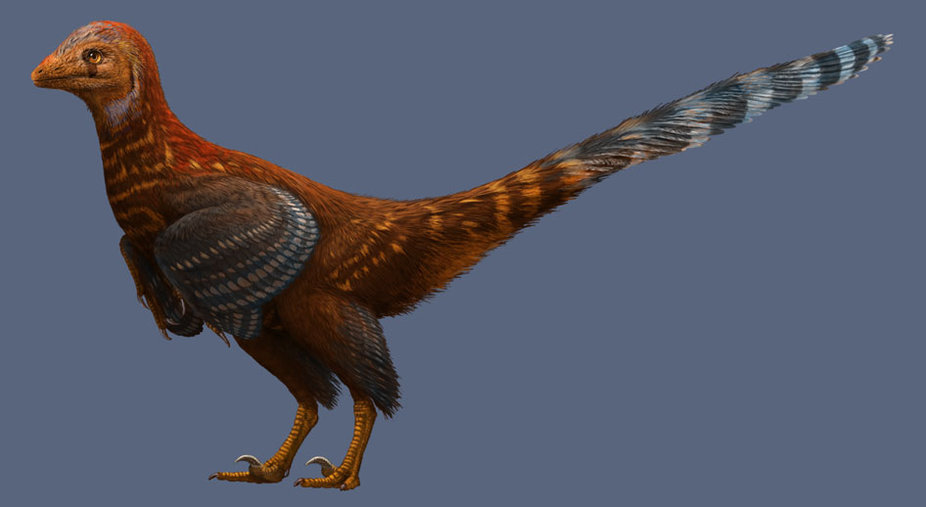
Restoration

Jianianhualong preserves the first evidence of feathers in an unquestionable troodontid, with the troodontid affinities of taxa such as Anchiornis, Eosinopteryx, Jinfengopteryx, and Xiaotingia having been questioned by various studies. Additionally, Jianianhualong represents the first record of asymmetrical feathers among troodontids, thus making troodontids the second group among non-avialan theropods to possess asymmetrical feathers; asymmetrical arm feathers are found in the microraptorians Microraptor, Changyuraptor, and possibly Zhenyuanlong. Asymmetrical feathers are correlated with flight capabilities among paravians, and their emergence marked a major step in the evolution of modern avian feathers. This trait may have been selected for due to its augmentation of locomotion on the ground or in the air.

However, the presence of asymmetrical feathers in Jianianhualong does not guarantee that it was capable of either gliding or powered flight. The feathers in the tail of Jianianhualong could certainly have functioned in either maintaining feather stability (the barbs of the leading edge, having a low angle of 10°, augmented the vane's rigidity) or controlling airflow (through the variation of the feathers' blade pitch). However, these feathers differ from those of modern birds in that the barbs of the trailing edge also have a relatively low angle of approximately 15°. Thus, aerodynamically speaking, the feathers in the tail of Jianianhualong likely did not have the same function as those of modern birds. Regardless, the subtriangular outline of the tail frond, as well as the slots separating the tips of individual feathers, would have provided drag reduction when the tail was in use.

== Paleoecology ==
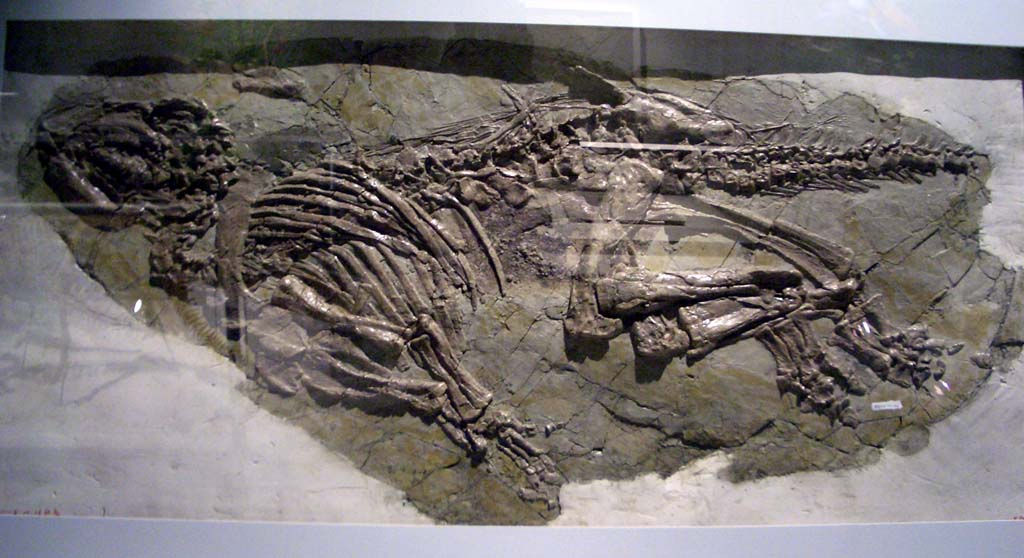
The hadrosauroid Jinzhousaurus was a contemporary of Jianianhualong

After Mei, Sinovenator, Sinusonasus, and Jinfengopteryx, Jianianhualong is the fifth named troodontid that has been discovered in the Jehol Biota as a whole, with the first three other troodontids also originating from the Yixian Formation. With Jianianhualong and Sinusonasus representing "transitional" and more derived forms of troodontids compared to Mei and Sinovenator, the diversity of troodontids within the Jehol was appreciable. Asides from troodontids, the Yixian Formation also preserves a diverse assemblage of other animals, both dinosaurian and non-dinosaurian. The hadrosauroid Jinzhousaurus is known from Baicai Gou, the same locality as that of Jianianhualong, as is the maniraptoran Yixianosaurus as well as hundreds of specimens from the choristodere Hyphalosaurus.

From elsewhere in the Dakangpu/Dawangzhangzi Beds, specimens have been discovered belonging to the birds Confuciusornis, Hongshanornis, Grabauornis, Liaoxiornis, Longicrusavis, Shanweiniao, Shenqiornis, and Zhongornis; the non-avialan theropod Sinosauropteryx; the ceratopsian Psittacosaurus; the pterosaur Cathayopterus; the lizards Dalinghosaurus and Yabeinosaurus; the choristoderes Hyphalosaurus and Monjurosuchus, of which the former is highly abundant; the turtle Manchurochelys; the mammals Acristatherium, Akidolestes, Chaoyangodens, Eomaia, Sinobaatar, and Sinodelphys; the frog Liaobatrachus; and fish, including Lycoptera (of which L. davidi is numerous), Peipiaosteus, and Protopsephurus.

Environmentally, Jianianhualong lived in a lacustrine area, as evinced by the tuffaceous sandstone present throughout the Dawangzhangzi Beds. Like the rest of the Yixian Formation, the environment represented by these assemblages was seasonally semi-arid, with a low mean air temperature of 10 ± 4 °C (50 ± 7 °F). The local flora consists of a mixed assemblage of gymnosperms, such as Czekanowskia, Schizolepis, and the ephedroids Amphiephedra, Chengia, Ephedrites, and Liaoxia; and also early angiosperms, including Archaefructus, Hyrcantha (formerly Sinocarpus), Leefructus, and Potamogeton. Leefructus in particular is a eudicot, being among the earliest records of the group.

== See also ==
- Timeline of troodontid research
- 2017 in archosaur paleontology
