= Chaoyangodens =

Chaoyangodens Temporal range: Early Cretaceous, 124.6–122.2 Ma

Scientific classification
- Kingdom: Animalia
- Phylum: Chordata
- Class: Mammalia
- Order: †Eutriconodonta
- Genus: †Chaoyangodens; Hou & Meng, 2014

Type species
- †Chaoyangodens lii Hou & Meng, 2014

Extinct genus of mammals

Chaoyangodens is an extinct genus of eutriconodont mammal from the Early Cretaceous of China. It includes a single species, Chaoyangodens lii, known from a single complete skeleton recovered from the Dawangzhangzi bed of the Yixian Formation, part of the fossiliferous Jehol biota. Chaoyangodens was a moderate-sized Mesozoic mammal (about 10.9 cm or 4.3 inches from snout tip to hip). The generic name refers to Chaoyang Prefecture while the specific name honors the collector of the fossil, Hai-Jun Li. Chaoyangodens is intermediate in age between Liaoconodon (from the younger Jiufotang Formation) and a diverse fauna of eutriconodonts from older beds of the Yixian Formation. Like Liaoconodon, it is not easily equated with other eutriconodonts, since it bears distinctive dental traits relative to recognized eutriconodont subgroups.

== Description ==
=== Dentition ===
Unlike gobiconodontids, the incisors are small, peg-like, and numerous, with 5 in the upper jaw and 4 in the lower. Unlike Jeholodens, the canines are robust, double-rooted, and vertically implanted. The most unique feature of Chaoyangodens is that the premolars are strongly reduced in number, with only a single premolar on each side of the snout in both the upper and lower jaw. There is also a large gap between the canines and premolars, especially on the lower jaw. The molars are a typical "triconodont" structure, with up to five large pointed cusps arranged in a single curved row from front-to-back. There are 3 upper molars and 4 lower molars. The molars are asymmetrical when viewed from the side, which excludes Chaoyangodens from affinities among "amphilestids". Likewise, the middle cusp (cusp A in the upper molars or cusp a in the lower molars) is significantly larger than the rest, unlike triconodontids.

=== Middle ear ===
Like most mammaliaforms and early mammals (including other eutriconodonts), Chaoyangodens has a transitional mammalian middle ear (TMME). In a TMME, the ear ossicles are reduced and nearly detached from the back of the jaw, but still retain a connection via a slender ossified meckelian cartilage.

Chaoyangodens adds valuable information to the study of mammalian ear evolution, since it has the oldest complete stapes ("stirrup" ossicle) reported in true mammal fossils. The stapes is rectangular, with a large oval-shaped opening (the stapedial foramen) flanked by two parallel rod-like columns (the anterior and posterior crus). This rectangular form is similar to non-mammalian synapsids, but the stapes of Chaoyangodens is much smaller, akin to other true mammals. There is also a distinctive tubercle (the process for insertion of the stapedius muscle, or PISM) on the posterior crus.

Monotremes and placental mammals have a stirrup- or rod-shaped stapes, with the two crus converging towards a narrow "head" (the connection to the quadrate/incus/"anvil"). All monotremes and some placental species completely lack a stapedial foramen or PISM, though humans retain a large stapedial foramen. The stapes of Chaoyangodens is most similar in shape to earlier mammaliaforms and to a lesser extent marsupials. This suggests that monotremes and eutherians evolved their narrow stapes convergently. It also indicates that the stapes was reduced simultaneously with the rest of the middle ear ossicles during the transition from a TMME to a fully-detached definitive mammalian middle ear (DMME). Data provided by Chaoyangodens, combined with embryological studies on modern mammals, has led its describers to the conclusion that the PISM and stapedius muscle developed from the tip of the interhyal, a mesenchymal deposit in the ear and jaw region of developing fetuses.

== Classification ==
In a phylogenetic analysis by Hou & Meng (2014), Chaoyangodens is found to be one of the most basal eutriconodonts. It is positioned a polytomy with Liaoconodon, a Jeholodens + Yanoconodon clade (Jeholodentidae), and a clade encompassing most other eutriconodonts. Gobiconodontids are an exception, as they are positioned closer to Theriiformes than to other eutriconodonts.
