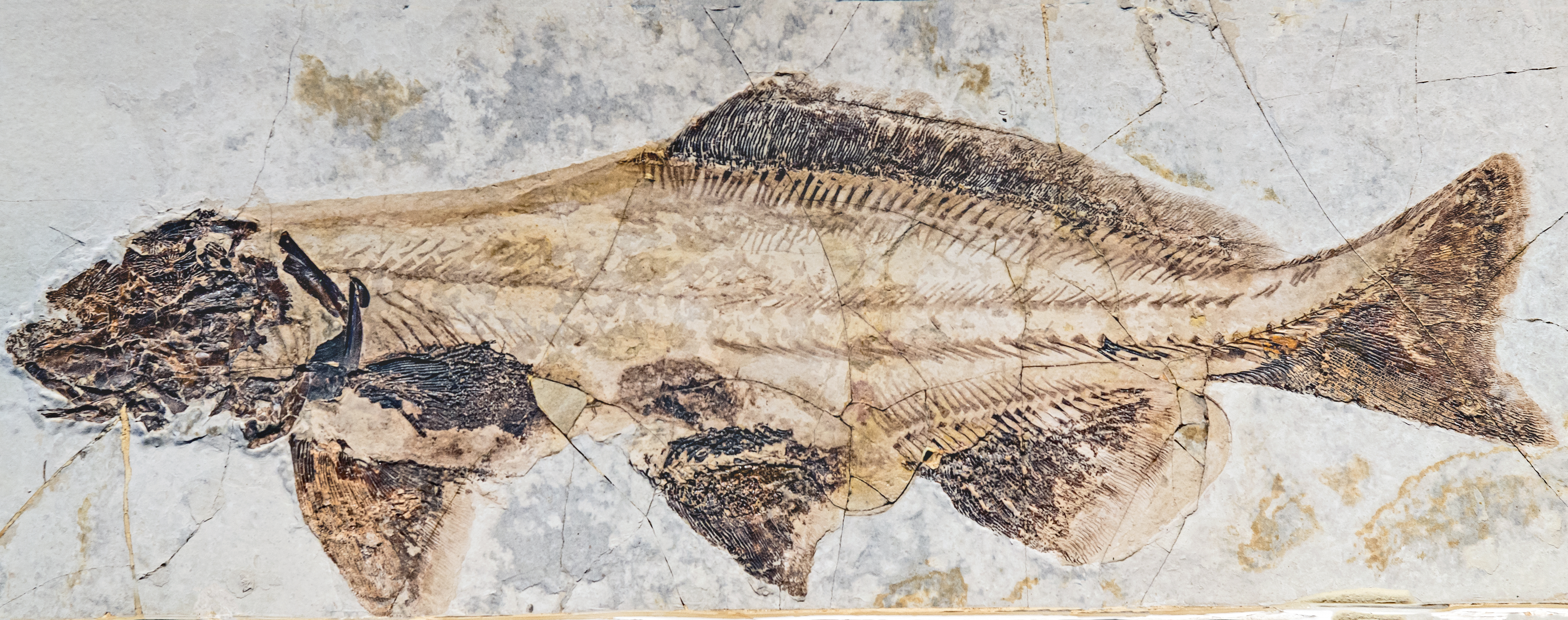
- Specimen of Yanosteus longidorsalis
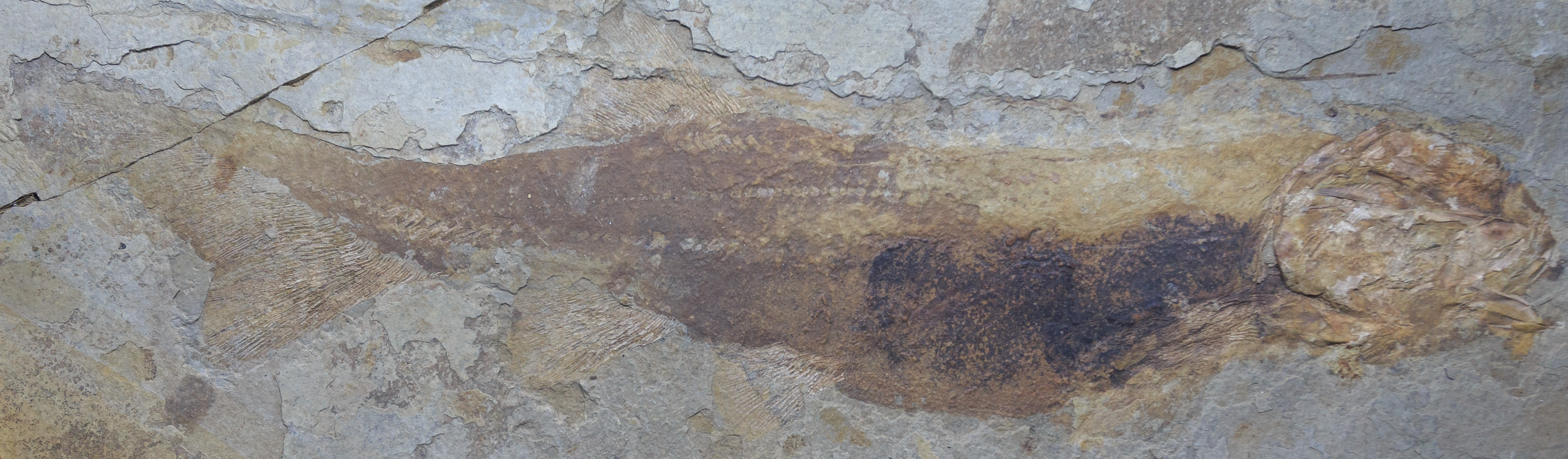
- Specimen of Peipiaosteus pani

Scientific classification
- Domain: Eukaryota
- Kingdom: Animalia
- Phylum: Chordata
- Class: Actinopterygii
- Order: Acipenseriformes
- Family: †Peipiaosteidae; Liu and Zhou, 1965

Genera
- See text

= Peipiaosteidae =

Peipiaosteidae Temporal range: Late Jurassic–Early Cretaceous

Extinct family of fishes

Peipiaosteidae is an extinct family of fish, known from the Late Jurassic and Early Cretaceous of Asia. They are members of Acipenseriformes, related to sturgeons (Acipenseridae) and paddlefish (Polyodontidae). Fossils have been found in freshwater deposits in China, Russia, Kazakhstan, and Mongolia. They are generally considered either the earliest diverging group of Acipenseriformes, or the sister group to the clade containing Acipenseridae and Polyodontidae. At least Yanosteus was likely to have been piscivorous, based on a specimen of Lycoptera found in the mouth of one specimen.

== Taxonomy ==
After.

- Stichopterus Reis, 1910
  - Stichopterus woodwardi Reis, 1910 Turgen Formation, Russia, Early Cretaceous
  - Stichopterus popovi Jakovlev, 1977 Gurvan-Eren Formation, Mongolia, Early Cretaceous (Aptian)
  - Indeterminate remains are known from the Early Cretaceous Murtoi Formation, Russia.
- Peipiaosteus Bai, 1983
  - Peipiaosteus fengningensis Bai, 1983 Yixian Formation, China, Early Cretaceous (Aptian),
- Liaosteus Lu, 1995
  - Liaosteus hongi Lu, 1995 Haifanggou Formation, China, Middle-Late Jurassic (Callovian/Oxfordian)
- Spherosteus Jakovlev, 1977
  - Spherosteus scharovi Jakovlev, 1977 Karabastau Formation, Kazakhstan, Middle-Late Jurassic (Callovian/Oxfordian)
- Yanosteus Jin et al., 1995
  - Yanosteus longidorsalis Jin et al., 1995 Yixian Formation, China, Early Cretaceous (Aptian)
