= Irenichthys =

Irenichthys Temporal range: Late Jurassic?-Early Cretaceous

Scientific classification
- Kingdom: Animalia
- Phylum: Chordata
- Class: Actinopterygii
- Order: Elopiformes
- Genus: †Irenichthys; Jakovlev, 1968

Type species
- †Irenichthys certus Jakovlev, 1968

Extinct genus of fishes

Irenichthys is an extinct genus of elopiform ray-finned fish known from the Early Cretaceous of the Transbaikal region, Russia. The type species is I. certus.

== Description ==
Irenichthys is a small fish reaching up to 30 cm (12 in) with moderately elongated and laterally compressed body. It have the dorsal fin with long base, the anal fin which length is half of the dorsal fin, and deeply notched heterocercal caudal fin. Its body is covered by moderately sized cycloid scales. Its teeth are weak, which appearance is like bristles. Although original description did not discussed about classification, it is later considered as a member of Elopiformes.

== Paleoecology ==
Its fossils are known from the Late Jurassic-Early Cretaceous Tugnuyskaya basin, the type specimen is from the Argun Formation which age is the Early Cretaceous. This fish lived in the large lake with other fauna like the teleost Lycoptera, acipenseriform Stichopterus and "palaeonisciform" Turgoniscus. Irenichthys is likely a benthic fish which fed on plants and aquatic invertebrates.
