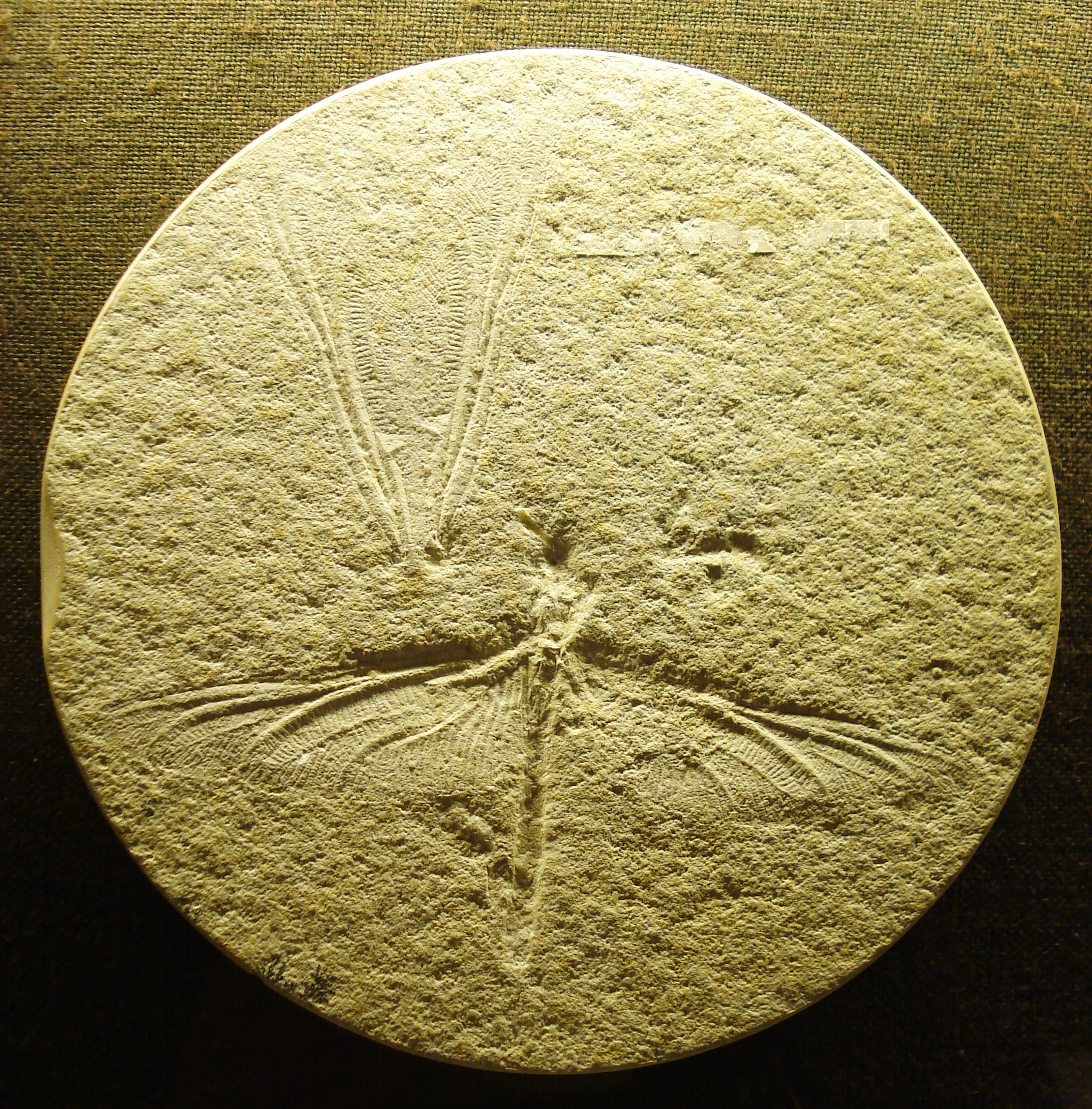
- Fossil of Urogomphus sp. or Aeschnidium sp. (Aeschnidiidae), from the Upper Jurassic Solnhofen Plattenkalk of Germany

Scientific classification
- Kingdom: Animalia
- Phylum: Arthropoda
- Clade: Pancrustacea
- Class: Insecta
- Order: Odonata
- Infraorder: Anisoptera
- Superfamily: †Aeschnidioidea
- Family: †Aeschnidiidae; Handlirsch, 1906

Type species
- †Aeschnidium bubas Westwood, 1856

Genera
- See text

= Aeschnidiidae =

Aeschnidiidae Temporal range: Jurassic to Late Cretaceous, 156–66 Ma

Extinct family of dragonflies

Aeschnidiidae is an extinct family of dragonflies. Aeschnidiids were widespread and could be found on nearly every continent on Earth. They were most diverse during the Early Cretaceous before completely disappearing at the end of the Maastrichtian. Many members of this family were large dragonflies, with wing lengths ranging from 35 to 45 mm.

== Genera ==
Genera of Aeschnidiid dragonfly
Generic name	Geographical location	Age
†Aegyptidium	Abu Ballas Formation, Egypt	122-112 Ma, Early Cretaceous
†Aeschnidiella	Ulyanovsk Oblast, Russia	125-113 Ma, Early Cretaceous
†Aeschnidiopsis	Walumbilla Formation, Australia	125-113 Ma, Early Cretaceous
†Aeschnidium	Lulworth Formation, England	145-140 Ma, Early Cretaceous
†Angloaeschnidium	La Huérguina Formation, Spain, and the Weald Clay Formation, England	130-125 Ma, Early Cretaceous
†Bergeriaeschnidia	Solnhofen Limestone, Germany	151-145 Ma, Late Jurassic
†Brunetaeschnidium	Nusplingen Limestone, Germany and the Solnhofen Limestone, Germany	156-145 Ma, Late Jurassic
†Brunneaeschnidia	Chijinbao Formation, China	125-113 Ma, Early Cretaceous
†Cooperaeschnidium	Weald Clay Formation, England	130-125.45 Ma, Early Cretaceous
†Coramaeschnidium	Weald Clay Formation, England	136.4-130 Ma, Early Cretaceous
†Cratoaeschnidium	Crato Formation, Brazil	115-113 Ma, Early Cretaceous
†Dakotaeschnidium	Fox Hills Formation, The United States of America	70.6-66 Ma, Late Cretaceous
†Deiciosaeschidium	Purbeck-Lulworth Formation, England	145-140 Ma, Early Cretaceous
†Diastatopaeschnidium	Purbeck-Lulworth Formation, England	145-140 Ma, Early Cretaceous
†Dracontaeschnidium	Yixian Formation, China	125-122 Ma, Early Cretaceous
†Gansuaeschnidia	Chijinbao Formation, China	125-113 Ma, Early Cretaceous
†Gigantoaeschnidium	La Huérguina Formation, Spain	130-125 Ma, Early Cretaceous
†Iberoaeschnidium	La Huérguina Formation, Spain	130-125 Ma, Early Cretaceous
†Jarzembowskiaeschnidium	Purbeck-Lulworth Formation, England	145-140 Ma, Early Cretaceous
†Kesseleraeschnidium	Weald Clay Formation, England	136-130 Ma, Early Cretaceous
†Kimmeridgebrachpteraeschnidium	Kimmeridge Clay Formation, England	156-151 Ma, Jurassic
†Leptaeschnidium	Zaza Formation, Russia	125-113 Ma, Early Cretaceous
†Linaeschnidium	Yixian Formation, China	125-122 Ma, Early Cretaceous
†Lithoaeschnidium	Solnhofen Limestone, Germany	151-145 Ma, Late Jurassic
†Lleidoaeschnidium	La Pedrera de Rubies Formation, Spain and the Weald Clay Formation, England	130-125 Ma, Early Cretaceous
†Malmaeschnidium	Solnhofen Limestone, Germany	151-145 Ma, Late Jurassic
†Misofaeschnidium	Nusplingen Limestone, Germany and the Solnhofen Limestone, Germany	156-145 Ma, Late Jurassic
†Nannoaeschnidium	La Huérguina Formation, Spain	130-125 Ma, Early Cretaceous
†Rossaeschnidium	Weald Clay Formation, England	130-125 Ma, Early Cretaceous
†Santanoptera	Crato Formation, Brazil	122-112 Ma, Early Cretaceous
†Sinaeschnidia	Hangjiahu Formation, China, the Laiyang Formation, China, the Baiwan Formation, China, the Yixian Formation, China, the Shahai Formation, China, the Chijinbao Formation, China, and the La Huérguina Formation, Spain	130-113 Ma, Early Cretaceous
†Sinostenophlebia	Qingshila Formation, China	129-125 Ma, Early Cretaceous
†Solnhofenia	Solnhofen Limestone, Germany	151-145 Ma, Late Jurassic
†Stylaeschnidium	Yixian Formation, China	125-122 Ma, Early Cretaceous
†Tauropteryx	Crimea, Ukraine	99.6-93.5 Ma, Late Cretaceous
†Urogomphus?	Solnhofen Limestone, Germany and the Purbeck-Lulworth Formation, England	151-140 Ma, Late Jurassic to Early Cretaceous
†Wightonia	Crato Formation, Brazil	122-112 Ma, Early Cretaceous
