= Murtoi Formation =

Geologic formation in Russia

- Stratigraphic range: Late Valanginian-Early Hauterivian; ~135–130 Ma
- Type: Geological formation
- Sub-units: Khambin & Mogoito Members
- Underlies: Volcanic rocks
- Overlies: Ubukun Formation
- Area: Lake Gusinoye depression
- Thickness: About 350 m (1,150 ft)

Lithology
- Primary: Conglomerate, sandstone, siltstone

Location
- Coordinates: 51.3°N 106.4°E
- Approximate paleocoordinates: 53.0°N 104.5°E
- Region: Transbaikalia
- Country: Russia
- Extent: Buryatia
- Murtoi Formation (Russia)

The Murtoi Formation is a geologic formation in vicinity of Lake Gusinoye in Russia. The Murtoi Fm's sedimentation age (136–130 Ma). It was deposited in the late Valanginian to Early Hauterivian of the Early Cretaceous.

Scientists were able to recreate the paleoenvironment at the time of the commencement of sedimentation in the Gusinoozersk Basin during the deposition of the Murtoi Fm based on fossils discovered at the Mogoito location. The greatest amount of vertebrate remains from the Gusinoozersk Basin were found there. The Mogoito locality exposes strata from the Murtoi Fm through a sequence of naturally occurring outcrops in shallow ravines and scours on the western edge of Lake Gusinoe. The area is a valuable resource for learning about Central Asia's vertebrate fauna from the Early Cretaceous. Petrified wood remnants and rare fragmented dinosaur fossils can be found in the lower alluvial-proluvial Murtoi section of the Mogoito locality. The area is composed of big and medium pebble conglomerates with varied rounding, gravelstone, and sandstone.

The sauropod Tengrisaurus starkovi is the primary fossil. There are also the remains of another sauropod, Sauropoda indet., albeit they are still being studied. Based on the isolated bones and teeth, three theropod groups from the Mogoito locality have been identified: Ornithomimosauria, Therizinosauroidea, and Dromaeosauridae. The Mogoito locality's "Psittacosaurus" sp. and all the remaining remnants that have been previously recognized as Ornithopoda indet. can be attributed to a member of the basal Ornithischian lineage Jeholosauridae indet. Remains of other diapsid reptiles such as lizards, pterosaurs, turtles Kirgizemys dmitrievi and choristoderes Khurendukhosaurus sp. are also found. There have been no records of the fossil crocodyliforms, another group of reptiles that can be found in more southern Late Mesozoic vertebrate faunas in Mongolia. It is impossible to rule out the idea that crocodyliforms did not make it into the paleontological record, but the most plausible explanation for this is the relatively chilly environment, which is unsuitable for them. Because some dinosaurs, like those found in the Kakanaut Formation (Chukotka, Russia), flourished and even reproduced in the cool temperate climate above the Arctic Circle, dinosaurs cannot be used as reliable climatic indicators. But in the Mogoito locality, the lack of crocodyliforms and the existence of turtles and choristoderes point to a temperate environment with an annual mean temperature that is far above freezing but still below 14°C. The worldwide cooling Weissert Event that occurred at ~133 Ma during the earliest Cretaceous (Berriasian to Barremian) and can be described as something "in-between" a hothouse and an icehouse corresponds with the sedimentation age of the Murtoi Fm (136–130 Ma). The world temperature was roughly 17°C on average.

Alluvial sediments contain fish remains Stichopterus sp., Paleonisciformes indet., cf. Irenichthys. sp. Notable is the finding of the eutherian mammal "Murtoilestes abramovi" in a Mogoito gully.

== Paleofauna ==
- Murtoilestes abramovi
- Dsungaripteridae indet.
- Tengrisaurus starkovi
- Jeholosauridae indet.
- Therizinosauroidea indet.
- Dromaeosauridae indet.
- Khurendukhosaurus bajkalensis
- Kirgizemys dmitrievi
- Stichopterus sp.

== See also ==
- List of dinosaur-bearing rock formations
  - List of stratigraphic units with few dinosaur genera
- List of fossiliferous stratigraphic units in Russia
