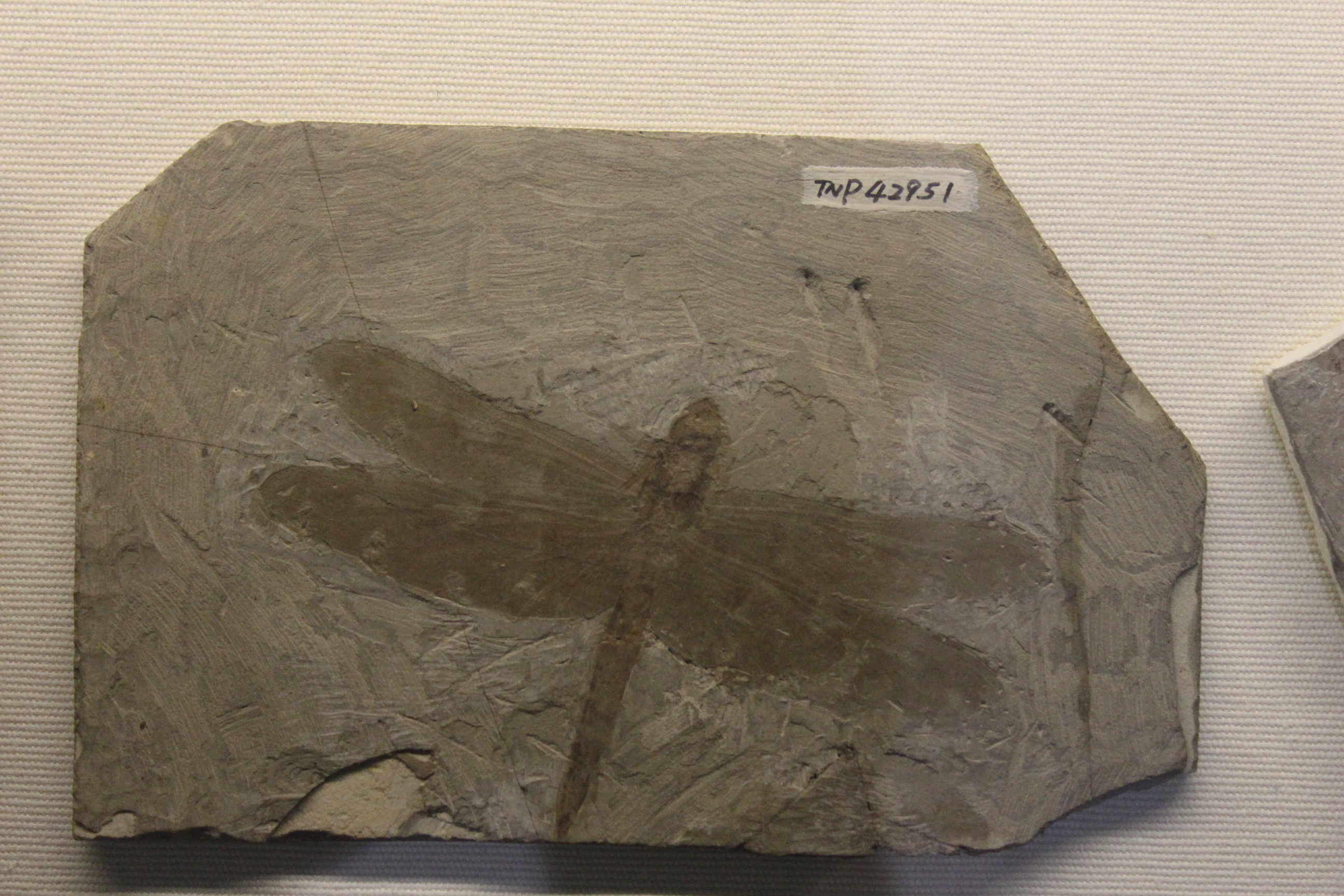
- Fossil specimen, Tianjin Natural History Museum

Scientific classification
- Kingdom: Animalia
- Phylum: Arthropoda
- Clade: Pancrustacea
- Class: Insecta
- Order: Odonata
- Infraorder: Anisoptera
- Family: †Aeschnidiidae
- Genus: †Sinaeschnidia; Hong, 1965

Type species
- Sinaeschnidia heishankowensis Hong, 1965

Species
- S. heishankowensis Hong, 1965; S. martinezdelclosi Fleck & Nel, 2003

= Sinaeschnidia =

Sinaeschnidia Temporal range: Early Cretaceous, 130–122 Ma

Extinct genus of dragonflies

Sinaeschnidia (meaning "Chinese Aeschnidium") is a genus of prehistoric dragonfly. S. heishankowensis is a common component of the Jehol Biota of northeastern China. It is known from numerous specimens, both nymphs and imagos (adults). S. martinezdelclosi is known from slightly earlier deposits in Las Hoyas, Spain.

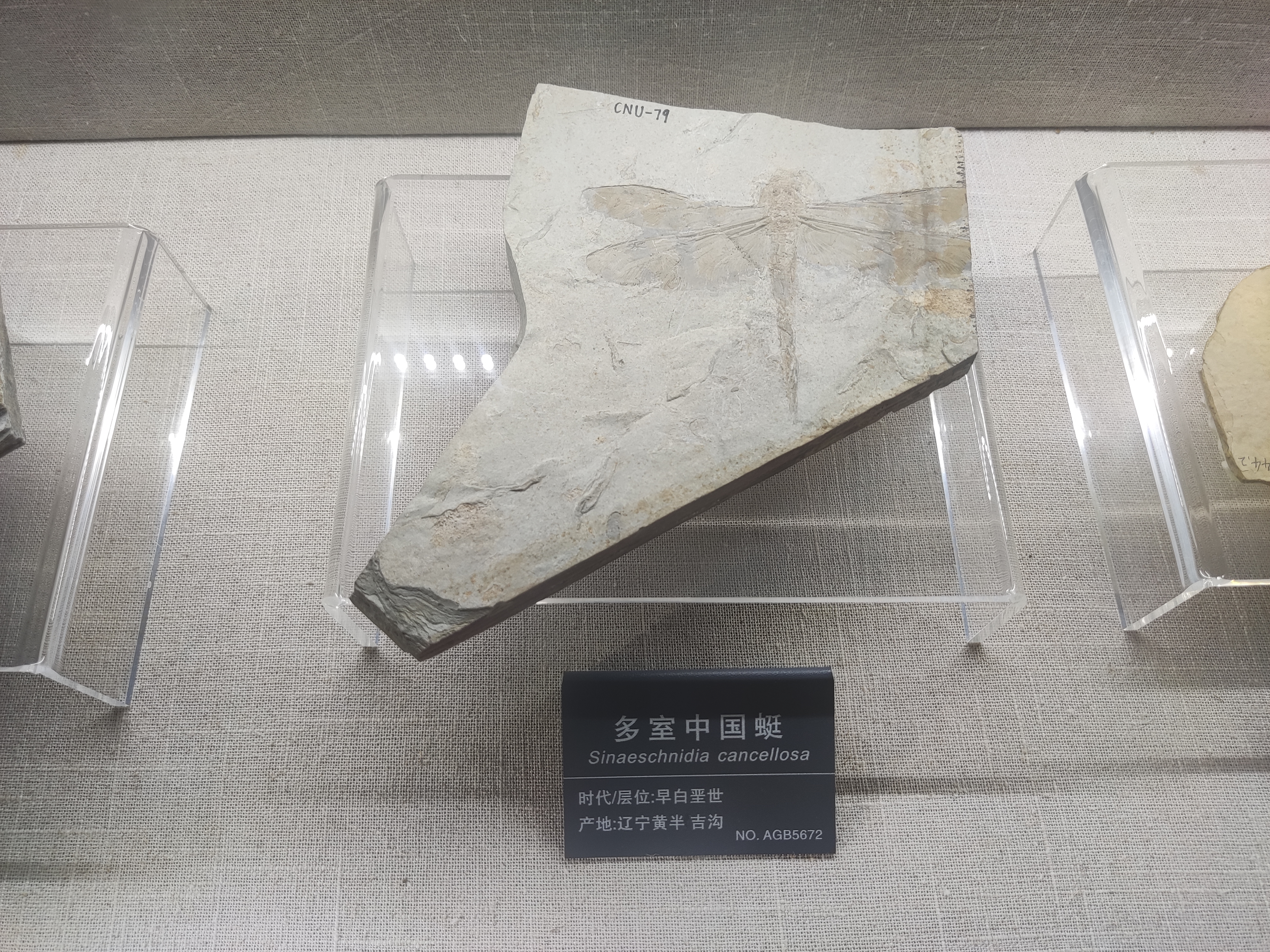
At the Anhui Geological Museum
