= Volgatitan =

Volgatitan Temporal range: Early Cretaceous, Hauterivian
- Skeletal diagram, known material in white

Scientific classification
- Kingdom: Animalia
- Phylum: Chordata
- Class: Reptilia
- Clade: Dinosauria
- Clade: Saurischia
- Clade: †Sauropodomorpha
- Clade: †Sauropoda
- Genus: †Volgatitan; Averianov & Efimov, 2018
- Species: †V. simbirskiensis

Binomial name
- †Volgatitan simbirskiensis Averianov & Efimov, 2018

Extinct genus of dinosaurs

Volgatitan (meaning "Volga giant") is a genus of sauropod dinosaur from the Early Cretaceous of the Ulyanovsk Oblast, Russia. The type and only species is Volgatitan simbirskiensis, known from seven caudal vertebrae from a single individual. It was initially described as a titanosaur related to Lognkosauria, but a later study suggests it may instead be a member of Mamenchisauridae. It was first described in November 2018 by Russian palaeontologists Alexander Averianov and Vladimir Efimov. It is estimated to have weighed about 17.3 metric tons (19.1 short tons).

== Classification ==
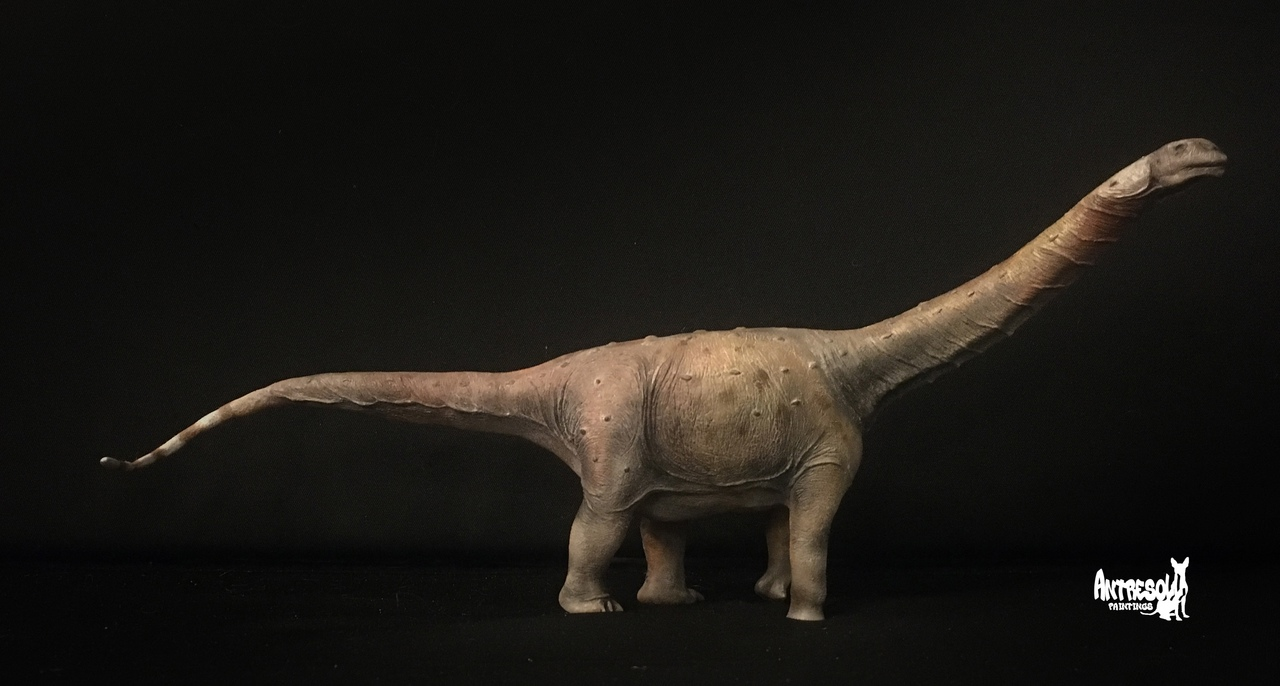
Hypothetical life reconstruction

Averianov and Efimov recovered Volgatitan as a lithostrotian titanosaur. They found Lithostrotia to be divided into two main lineages, one containing Saltasauridae, the other containing Lognkosauria, with Volgatitan belonging to the latter. The following cladogram follows their analysis.

- Lithostrotia
  - Malawisaurus
  - - - Aeolosaurus
      - Nemegtosaurus
      - Rapetosaurus
      - Tapuiasaurus
      - Tengrisaurus
      - - Isisaurus
        - Saltasauridae
    - - Pitekunsaurus
      - Volgatitan
      - - Epachthosaurus
        - - Muyelensaurus
          - Rinconsaurus
          - Lognkosauria

In 2026, Mannion and Carvalho included Volgatitan in their phylogenetic analysis, and found it to be a member of the family Mamenchisauridae.
