= Tengrisaurus =

Tengrisaurus Temporal range: Early Cretaceous, Valanginian

Scientific classification
- Kingdom: Animalia
- Phylum: Chordata
- Class: Reptilia
- Clade: Dinosauria
- Clade: Saurischia
- Clade: †Sauropodomorpha
- Clade: †Sauropoda
- Clade: †Macronaria
- Clade: †Titanosauria
- Genus: †Tengrisaurus; Averianov & Skutschas, 2017
- Species: †T. starkovi

Binomial name
- †Tengrisaurus starkovi Averianov & Skutschas, 2017

Genus of sauropod dinosaurs

Tengrisaurus (meaning "Tengri lizard") is an extinct genus of titanosaurian sauropod dinosaur known from the Early Cretaceous (Valanginian) Murtoi Formation of Russia. The genus was described in 2017 by Averianov & Skutschas, containing a single species, Tengrisaurus starkovi, known from several isolated vertebrae. Despite being among the oldest named definitive titanosaurs, it is an anatomically derived member of the clade Colossosauria.

== History and description ==
In 2017, Averianov & Skutschas described Tengrisaurus starkovi as a new genus and species of lithostrotian titanosaur based on three caudal vertebrae: the holotype, ZIN PH 7/13, an anterior vertebra, ZIN PH 14/13, another anterior vertebra, and ZIN PH 8/13, a middle vertebra. In 2021, Averianov, Sizov & Skutschas published a reassessment of the genus, referring BM 38/7120, an additional anterior caudal vertebra, to the species.

ZIN PH 32/13, a third caudal vertebra, has also been referred to this species. In 2025, Averianov and colleagues revisited Tengrisaurus yet again, describing the first non-caudal vertebral element referable to T. starkovi: ZIN PH 31/13, a posterior cervical (neck) vertebra. Even though it was found in isolation (not associated with caudal elements), the authors determined it could still be referred to this taxon due to similarities in both the cervicals and caudals to those elements in the very similar Dongbeititan, which is known from more complete, articulated remains.

Tengrisaurus is characterized by strongly procoelous anterior and middle caudal vertebrae (diagnostic of lithostrotians) with strongly developed pre-epipophyses, highly pneumatic neural spines, and solid bone structure of the centra.

== Classification ==
In their 2017 description of Tengrisaurus, Averianov and Skutschas recovered it as a member of the Lithostrotia in their phylogenetic analysis, diverging between Rapetosaurus and Trigonosaurus near the Saltasauridae. In their description of Volgatitan, another Russian titanosaur, Averianov and Efimov (2018) found similar results, albeit with less resolution. They found Lithostrotia to be divided into two main lineages, one containing Saltasauridae and the other containing Lognkosauria, with Tengrisaurus belonging to the former. In the 2021 reassessment by Averianov, Sizov & Skutschas, Tengrisaurus was instead recovered as more closely allied with lognkosaurs (and the Colossosauria). Their 50% majority rule tree was better resolved, with Tengrisaurus diverging after Epachthosaurus as the sister taxon to the Colossosauria.

In their 2025 publication on Tengrisaurus, Averianov and colleagues incorporated the newly-described cervical vertebra as part of the scoring for this taxon in their phylogenetic matrix, derived from that published by Poropat et al. (2023). Similar to the results of Averianov et al. (2021), Tengrisaurus was recovered in a position diverging after Epachthosaurus, as the sister taxon to the clade formed by Rinconsauria and Lognkosauria within a more broadly-defined Colossosauria comprising all titanosaurs more closely related to Patagotitan than Saltasaurus. The researchers noted that, while Dongbeititan was recovered outside of Titanosauria in their analysis, this is likely due to limited amount of information available for its reasonably well-preserved skeleton, as it is anatomically very similar to Tengrisaurus and may be its closest known relative. These results are displayed in the cladogram below:

- Titanosauria
  - - Abdarainurus
    - - Andesaurus
      - - Huabeisaurus
        - - Gandititan
          - - Dongyangosaurus
            - Erketu
  - - Ruixinia
    - - - Gobititan
        - 'Huanghetitan' ruyangensis
      - - - Daxiatitan
          - Xianshanosaurus
        - Lithostrotia
          - Malawisaurus
          - Eutitanosauria
            - Saltasauroidea
              ⊞
              - - Tapuiasaurus
                - - Mongolosaurus
                  - Nemegtosaurus
              - - - Aeolosaurus
                  - Rapetosaurus
                - - Isisaurus
                  - - Saltasaurus
                    - - Alamosaurus
                      - Opisthocoelicaudia
              ⊟
            - Colossosauria
              - Pitekunsaurus
              - - Epachthosaurus
                - - Tengrisaurus
                  - - Rinconsauria
                      ⊞
                      - Rinconsaurus
                      - - - Jainosaurus
                          - Vahiny
                        - - Antarctosaurus
                          - Normanniasaurus
                      ⊟
                    - Lognkosauria
                      ⊞
                      - Muyelensaurus
                      - - Mendozasaurus
                        - - - Argentinosaurus
                            - Futalognkosaurus
                          - - Notocolossus
                            - Patagotitan
                            - Puertasaurus
                      ⊟
