= Jehol Biota =

Ecosystem of northeastern China between 133 and 120 million years ago

The Jehol Biota includes all the living organisms – the ecosystem – of northeastern China between 135 and 121 million years ago. This is the Lower Cretaceous ecosystem which left fossils in the Yixian Formation and Jiufotang Formation. These deposits are composed of layers of tephra and sediment. It is also believed to have left fossils in the Sinuiju series of North Korea. The ecosystem in the Lower Cretaceous was dominated by wetlands and numerous lakes (not rivers, deltas, or marine habitats). Rainfall was seasonal, alternating between semiarid and mesic conditions. The climate was temperate. The Jehol ecosystem was interrupted periodically by ash eruptions from volcanoes to the west. The word "Jehol" is a historical transcription of the former Rehe Province.

== Origin ==
Some scientists have argued that the Jehol Biota evolved directly from the preceding Daohugou Biota without any strongly defined division. However, the absolute dating of the Daohugou beds has been the subject of divergent opinion: in 2006, Wang et al. found an overall similarity between the fossil animals found in the Daohugou Beds and the "Jehol Biota" from the Yixian Formation. Several other research teams, including Liu et al., have attempted to disprove this reasoning by using Zircon U-Pb dating on the volcanic rocks overlying and underlying salamander-bearing layers (salamanders are often used as index fossils). Liu et al. found that the Daohugou beds formed between 164 and 158 million years ago, in the Middle to Late Jurassic. Later, Ji et al. argued that the key indicator of the Jehol biota are the index fossil fishes Peipiaosteus and Lycoptera. Under this definition, the earliest evolutionary stage of the Jehol Biota is represented by the Huajiying Formation.

== Fossil preservation ==
Northeastern China provinces

The Yixian and Jiufotang Formations are considered Lagerstätte, meaning that they have exceptionally good conditions for fossil preservation. The fossils are numerous, but also very well preserved – often including articulated skeletons, soft tissues, colour patterns, stomach contents, and twigs with leaves and flowers still attached. Zhonghe Zhou et al.. (2003) deduced two things from this. The first is that the land animals and plants were washed into the lakes very gently, or were already in the lakes when they died. They do not show the damage seen in fossils formed by large floods. Secondly, volcanic ash is commonly inter-bedded with lake sediments, and ashfalls seem to have quickly buried the fossilized organisms, creating anoxic conditions around them and preventing scavenging.

== Refuge and laboratory ==
Zhonghe Zhou et al. (2003) noted that, for the Early Cretaceous, the Jehol Biota includes a mixture of advanced and ancient species, and also of species found only in the Jehol and others found all around the world. It is possible that northeast Asia was isolated for part of the Jurassic by the Turgai Sea which separated Europe from Asia at the time.

The Jehol Biota includes many species that were previously known only from the Late Jurassic or earlier. These "relict" species include the compsognathid dinosaur Sinosauropteryx and the anurognathid pterosaur Dendrorhynchoides. It also has the earliest and most primitive known members of groups that spread all around the world by the Late Cretaceous, including neoceratopsians, therizinosaurs, tyrannosaurs, and oviraptorids. Northeastern Asia may have been the center of diversification of these dinosaur groups.

The Jehol Biota was not entirely isolated, however, because it also includes animals which were known from all around the world at the same time, including discoglossid frogs, paramacellodid lizards, multituberculate mammals, enantiornithine birds, ctenochasmatid pterosaurs, iguanodontian ornithopods, titanosauriform sauropods, nodosaurid ankylosaurs, and dromaeosaurid theropods.

== Diversity ==
The Jehol Biota is particularly noteworthy for the very high diversity of fossils and the very large numbers of individuals of each species that have been recovered.

The Jehol Biota has produced fossils of plant macro- and microfossils, including angiosperms (the earliest known), charophytes and dinocysts, snails (gastropods), clams (bivalves), superabundant aquatic arthropods called conchostracans, ostracods, shrimps, insects, spiders, fish, frogs and salamanders (amphibians), turtles, choristoderes, lizards (squamates), pterosaurs, and dinosaurs including feathered dinosaurs, the largest mammals known from the Mesozoic, and a great diversity of birds including the earliest advanced birds.

The forests around the lakes were dominated by conifers including members of the podocarp, pine, araucaria, and cypress families. There were also ginkgos, czekanowskialeans, bennettitaleans, ephedra, horsetails, ferns, and mosses. The leaves and needles of the trees show adaptations to a dry season, but some of the ferns and mosses are types that grow in very wet habitats. It is possible that the latter avoided dry conditions by growing very close to bodies of water. Archaefructus has been described as the earliest known flowering plant (Angiosperm), and it is reconstructed as an aquatic plant.

Gu (1983 and 1995) defined the following species as typifying the Jehol Biota:

- gastropods: Bellamya clavilithiformis, B. fengtienensis, Probaicalia gerassimovi, P. spp., Viviparus, Galba, Hydrobia;
- bivalves: Arguniella cf. ventricosa (=Ferganoconcha linguanense)-Sphaerium (Sphaerium) anderssoni (=Sphaerium jeholensis) fossil group, Nakamuranaia, Weichangella;
- conchostracans: Eosestheria-Diestheria-Liaoningestheria or Eosestheria fossil group, Fengninggrapta, Yanjiestheria, Pseudestherites, Orthestheria;
- ostracods: Cypridea sulcata, C. vitimensis, C. yumenensis, C. koskulensis, C. tumescens-C. dunkeri-C. granulosa assemblage, C. (Yumenia) equimarginata, Limnocypridea tumulosa;
- insects: Ephemeropsis trisetalis, Mesolygaeus laiyangensis, Chironomaptera menlanura, Coptoclava longipoda, Clyptostemma xyphidle, Sinaeschuidia heishankouensis;
- fish: Lycoptera spp., Peipiaosteus, Sinamia, Haizhoulepis;
- reptiles: Monjurosuchus splendens (including Rhynchosaurus orientalis), Yabeinosaurus tenuis, Luanpingosaurus, Psittacosaurus;
- mammals: Endotherium niinomi, Origolestes lii.

== Study ==
The name "Jehol Biota" was first published by Gu (1962), but was in use by geologists and paleontologists by 1959. This term replaced the former "Jehol Fauna", which Amadeus William Grabau (1923) defined as the fossil assemblage typified by numerous fossils of the conchostracan Eosestheria, the mayfly Ephemeropsis, and the Teleost fish Lycoptera. Thus it was sometimes called "EEL".

The Jehol group was defined by Gu (1962 and 1983) as a group of geological formations including the Jehol Coal-bearing Beds, the Jehol Oil Shale Beds, and the Jehol Volcanic Rocks. By now the group includes, in ascending order, the Yixian Formation (including the Jingangshan, Tuhulu, Jianchang, Lower Volcanic and Volcanic Rock formations), the Jiufotang Formation (including the Shahai Formation) and the Fuxin Formation (including the Binggou, Haizhou and Upper Volcanic formations). Chiappe et al. argued in 1999 that the lower beds of the Yixian were best subdivided into a separate formation, the Chaomidianzi Formation, with a type locality at the village of Sihetun, approximately 25 km south of Beipiao City. However, this classification has fallen out of favor, and the Chaomidianzi Formation is disused as a synonym of the Jianshangou Bed of the Yixian Formation.

In 2008, Ji et al. argued that these traditional definitions of the Jehol Biota arbitrarily excluded earlier fossil beds that clearly represent the first evolutionary stages of the later faunas, even though lower beds also had representatives of Ephemeropsis and Lycoptera. They argued that the boundaries of the biota should rather be set based on the distinctive large-scale sequences of volcanism which produced the strata, with the upper boundary set at the Shahai and Fuxin formations and the lower boundary at the Zhangjiakou Formation. Along with this sedimentary correlation, they noted that the best index fossils to identify the biota are Peipiaosteus and Lycoptera. Under this definition, the earliest stage of the Jehol Biota is represented by the Huajiying Formation.

== See also ==
- Daohugou Biota
- Jiufotang Formation
- Yixian Formation
  - Paleobiota of the Yixian Formation
