= Stichopterus =

Stichopterus Temporal range: Early Cretaceous, 125–112 Ma

Scientific classification
- Kingdom: Animalia
- Phylum: Chordata
- Class: Actinopterygii
- Order: Acipenseriformes
- Family: †Peipiaosteidae
- Genus: †Stichopterus; Reis, 1909

Other species
- †Stichopterus gracilis (Rohon, 1890); †Stichopterus popovi Jakovlev, 1986; †Stichopterus reissi Jakovlev, 1977; †Stichopterus woodwardi Reis, 1909

Extinct genus of fishes

Stichopterus is an extinct genus of chondrostean ray-finned fish that lived during the Early Cretaceous epoch in Asia. It has been found in Russia (Murtoi Formation) and Mongolia.

The type species, Stichopterus woodwardi, was named and described in 1909. Since then, up to three other species have been named or were reallocated to Stichopterus, respectively.

Stichopterus is similar to Peipiaosteus from China. Both genera belong to the family Peipiaosteidae, together with Liaosteus, Spherosteus, and Yanosteus. Peipiaosteidae are extinct relatives of Modern sturgeons and paddlefishes (Acipenseroidei).

== See also ==
- Prehistoric fish
- List of prehistoric bony fish
