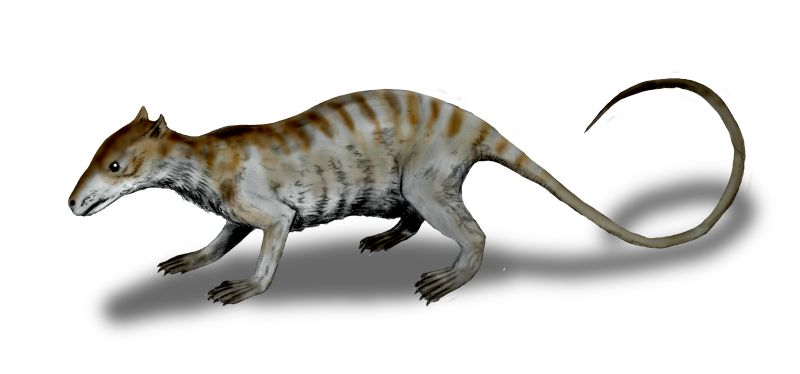
- Jeholodens jenkinsi

Scientific classification
- Domain: Eukaryota
- Kingdom: Animalia
- Phylum: Chordata
- Class: Mammalia
- Order: †Eutriconodonta
- Family: †Jeholodentidae; Luo et al., 2007

Type genus
- †Jeholodens Ji et al., 1999

Genera
- †Yanoconodon; Luo, Chen, Li & Chen, 2007 †Jeholodens; Ji, Luo & Ji, 1999

= Jeholodentidae =

Jeholodentidae Temporal range: Early Cretaceous, 125–122 Ma

Extinct family of mammals

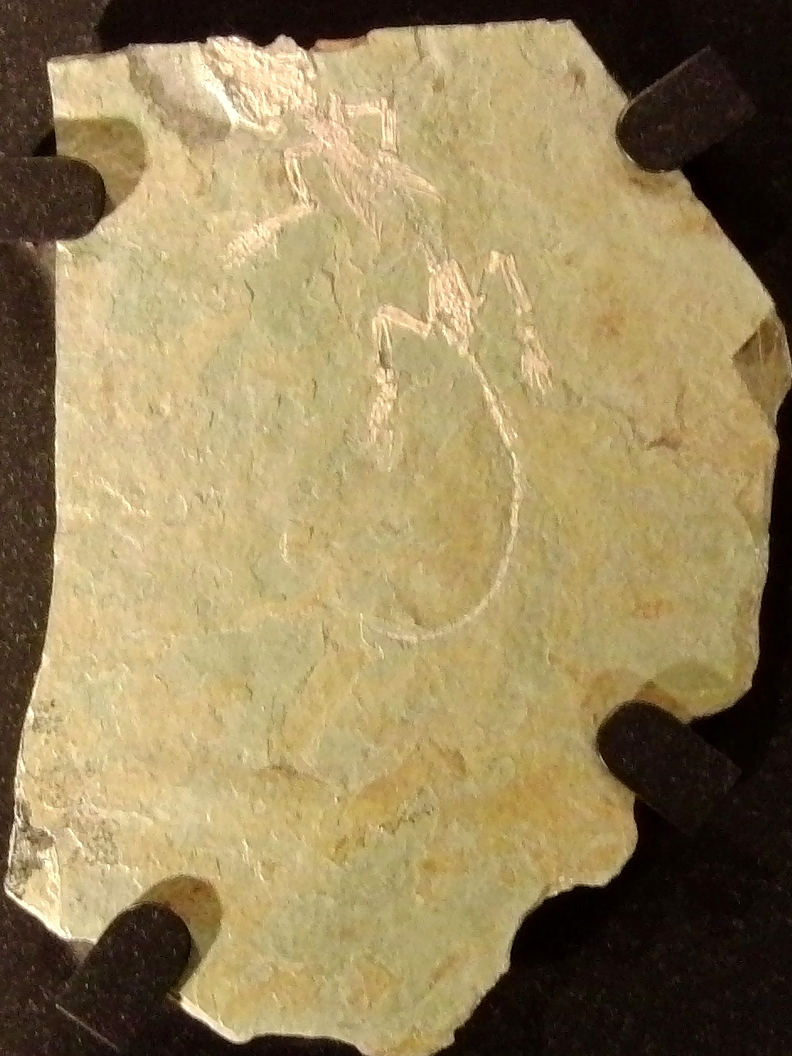
Fossil specimen of Jeholodens jenkinsi, National Museum of Nature and Science, Tokyo

The family Jeholodentidae is a possible eutriconodont family that was present in China around 125 million years ago during the time of the dinosaurs. There are currently two genera assigned to the family, Yanoconodon and Jeholodens.

However, recent studies have shown it to be paraphyletic in relation to Triconodontidae, with Yanoconodon being closer to them than to Jeholodens.

== Taxonomy ==
- Family †Jeholodentidae Luo et al., 2007
  - Genus †Yanoconodon Luo, Chen, Li & Chen, 2007
    - Species †Yanoconodon allini Luo, Chen, Li & Chen, 2007
  - Genus †Jeholodens Ji, Luo & Ji, 1999
    - Species †Jeholodens jenkinsi Ji, Luo & Ji, 1999
