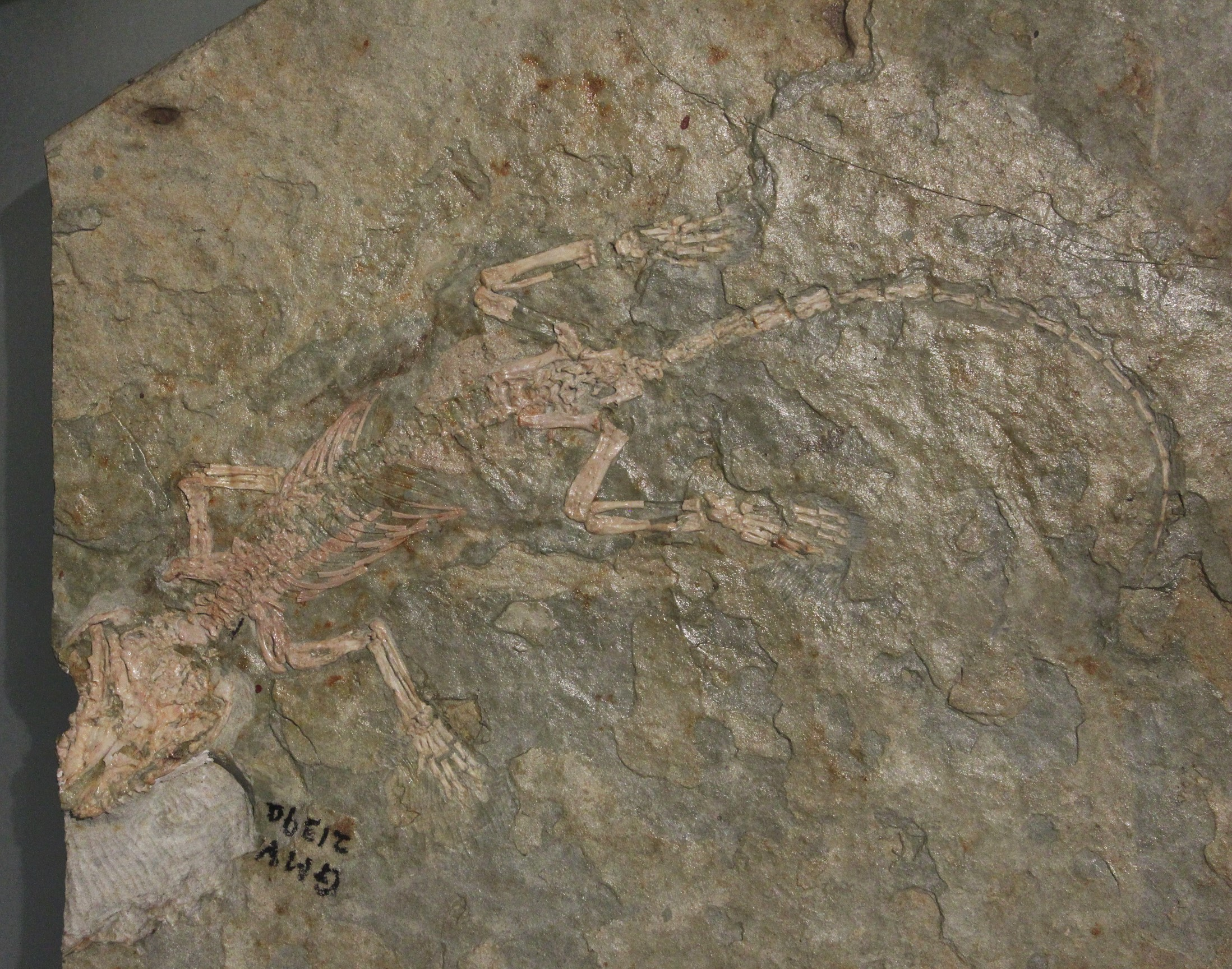
- Type specimen, Geological Museum of China

Scientific classification
- Kingdom: Animalia
- Phylum: Chordata
- Class: Mammalia
- Order: †Eutriconodonta
- Family: †Jeholodentidae
- Genus: †Jeholodens; Ji et al., 1999

Type species
- †Jeholodens jenkinsi Ji et al., 1999

= Jeholodens =

Jeholodens Temporal range: Early Cretaceous, 125 Ma

Extinct family of mammals

Jeholodens is an extinct genus of primitive mammal belonging to the order Eutriconodonta, and which lived in present-day China during the Middle Cretaceous about 125 million years ago.

Only one specimen has been formally described. This specimen (the holotype) consists of a virtually complete articulated skull and skeleton, it shared its corporal characteristics with most other Mesozoic mammals; it was a long-tailed, nocturnal tetrapod (with prehensile fingers and toes) which hunted insects, its food, during the night.

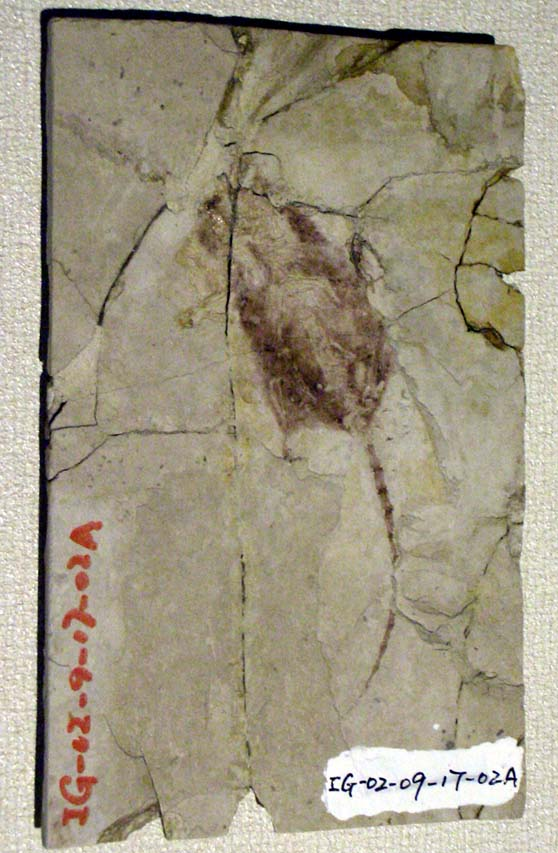
Possible specimen displayed in Hong Kong Science Museum

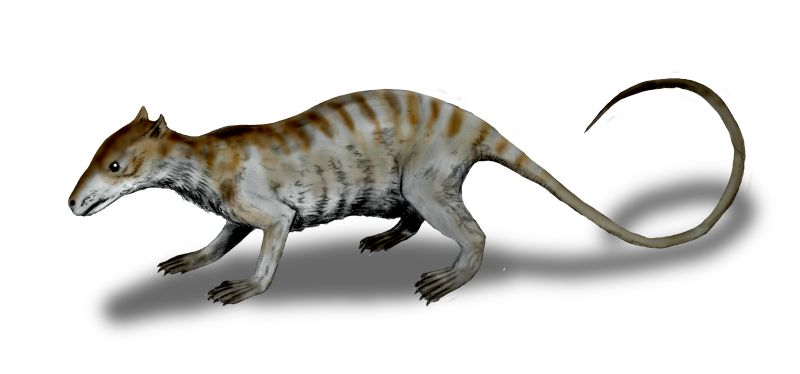
Restoration

It is suspected to be a nocturnal creature because it had very large eyes which were roughly 5 mm across. This would have allowed it to have better night vision for catching insects. It is notable for its relatively derived forelimb morphology, having shoulder blades and other pectoral girdle elements comparable to those of modern therians like opossums. It also had grasping hands. By contrast, however, the hindlimbs retained primitive characters, suggesting a semi-sprawling stance.

Recent studies show that it was specialised to an arboreal lifestyle, possessing prehensile hands.
