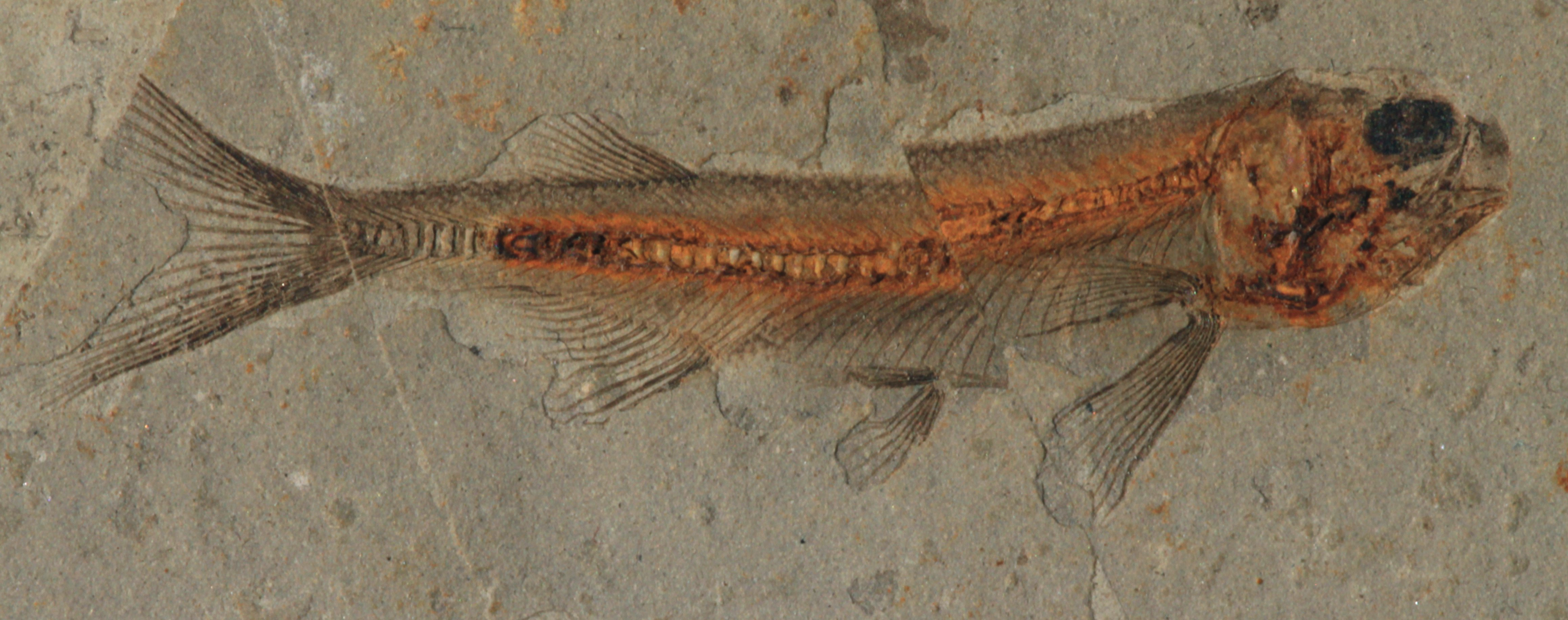
- L. davidi, from Yixian, Liaoning, China, Lower Cretaceous (Aptian)

Scientific classification
- Kingdom: Animalia
- Phylum: Chordata
- Class: Actinopterygii
- Division: Teleostei
- Cohort: Osteoglossomorpha
- Order: †Lycopteriformes
- Family: †Lycopteridae
- Genus: †Lycoptera; Müller, 1847

Type species
- †Lycoptera middendorffi Müller, 1847

Species
- See text

Synonyms
- Prolebias Sauvage, 1880

= Lycoptera =

Lycoptera Temporal range: Barremian to Aptian (Questionable record from Upper Jurassic)

Extinct genus of fishes

Lycoptera is an extinct genus of fish that lived from Lower Cretaceous, Barremian to Aptian in present-day China, North Korea, Mongolia and Siberia. Although there is record from Jurassic Formation in Siberia, its age remains questionable. It is known from abundant fossils representing sixteen species, which serve as important index fossil used to date geologic formations in China. Along with the genus Peipiaosteus, Lycoptera has been considered a defining member of the Jehol Biota, a prehistoric ecosystem famous for its feathered dinosaurs, which flourished for 20 million years during the Early Cretaceous, where it occurs abundantly in often monospecific beds, where they are thought to have died in seasonal mass death events. Lycoptera is a crown group teleost belonging to an early diverging lineage of the Osteoglossomorpha, which contains living mooneyes, arapaima, arowana, elephantfish and knifefish/featherbacks.

== Description and ecology ==
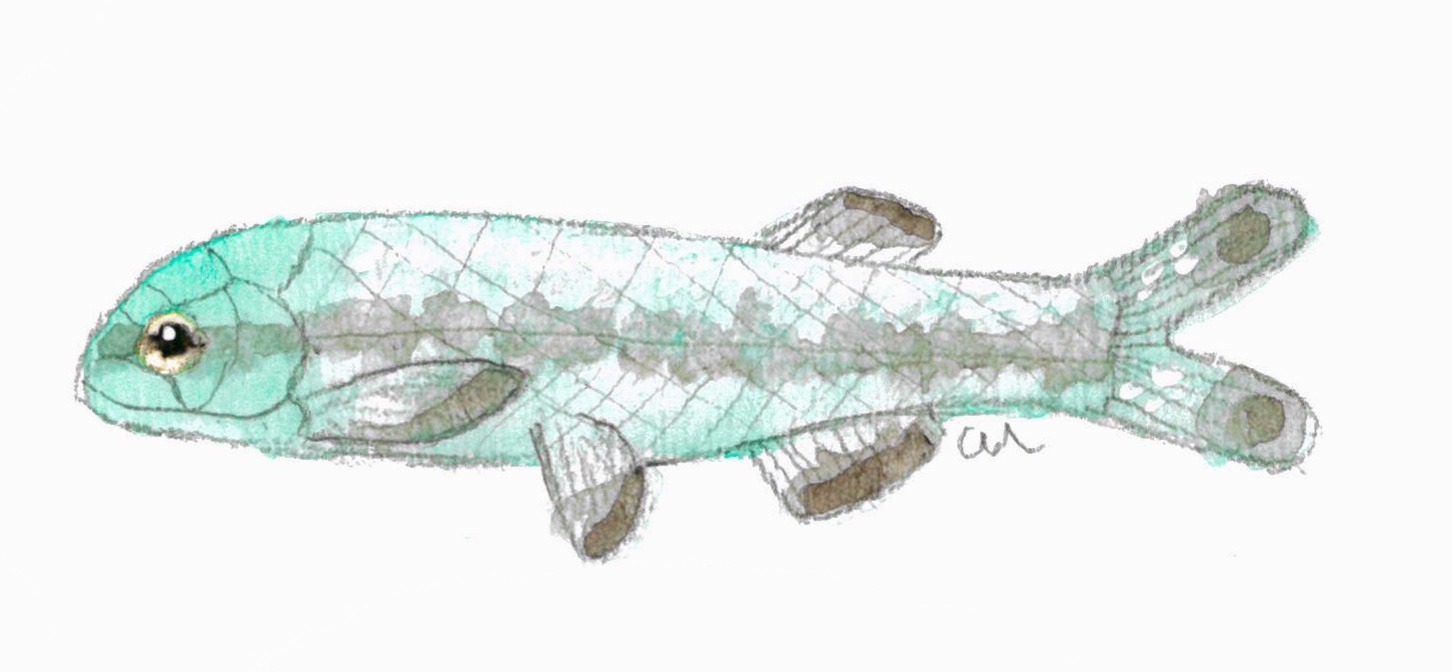
A reconstruction of Lycoptera davidi

Lycoptera was a small freshwater fish. Most species fed on plankton, and had numerous tiny teeth. A few species like L. gansuensis, L. muroii, and L. sinensis had larger teeth and probably fed on small insects and their larvae.

Many specimens preserve minute details and impressions of soft tissues, and fossils are often orange in color. Lycoptera was covered in tiny oval scales about 1.2 millimeters across, and, in life, would have had a superficial resemblance to the common minnow.

Lycoptera fossils are commonly found in large groups, buried together quickly in fine lake sediments likely due to mass death events from seasonal upwelling of anoxic waters during late autumn and winter. This has led to suggestions that they were gregarious in life, congregating in shoals.

Lycoptera was preyed on by other fish within the Jehol Biota lake ecosystems, such as the primitive paddlefish Protopsephurus and the peipaiosteid (an extinct relative of sturgeons and paddlefish) Yanosteus, which have been found with Lycoptera remains as stomach contents. The long-necked choristodere reptile Hyphalosaurus has also been proposed as a likely predator.

== Classification and species ==
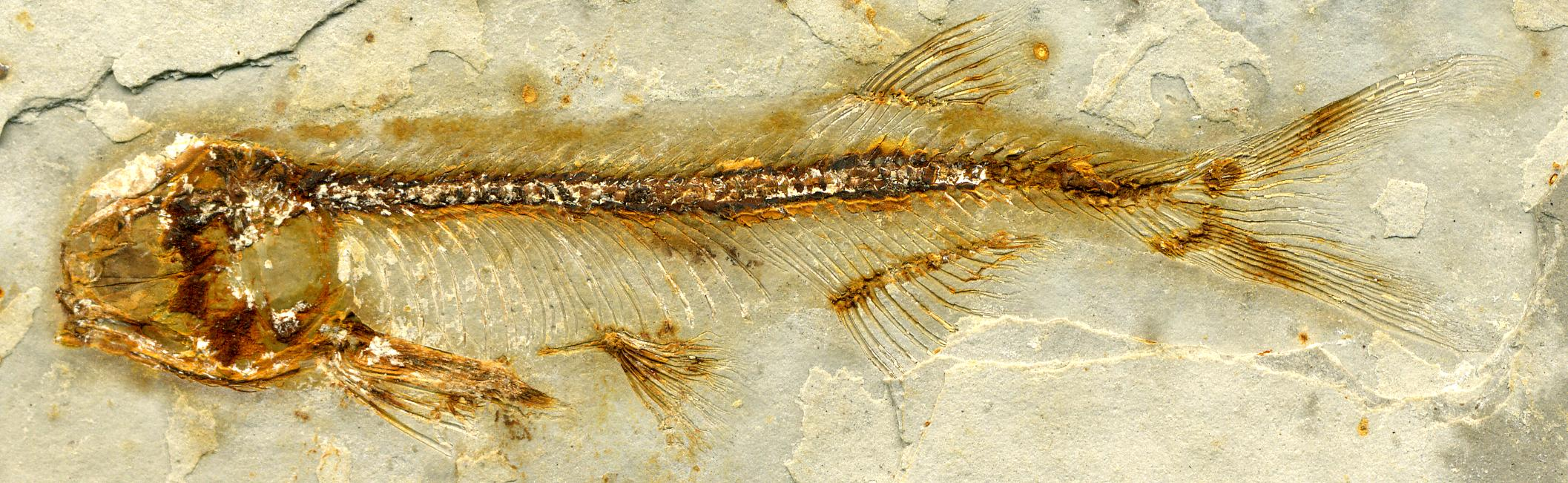
Lycoptera davidi (6.8 cm long), near-lowermost Cretaceous, Liaoning Province, China

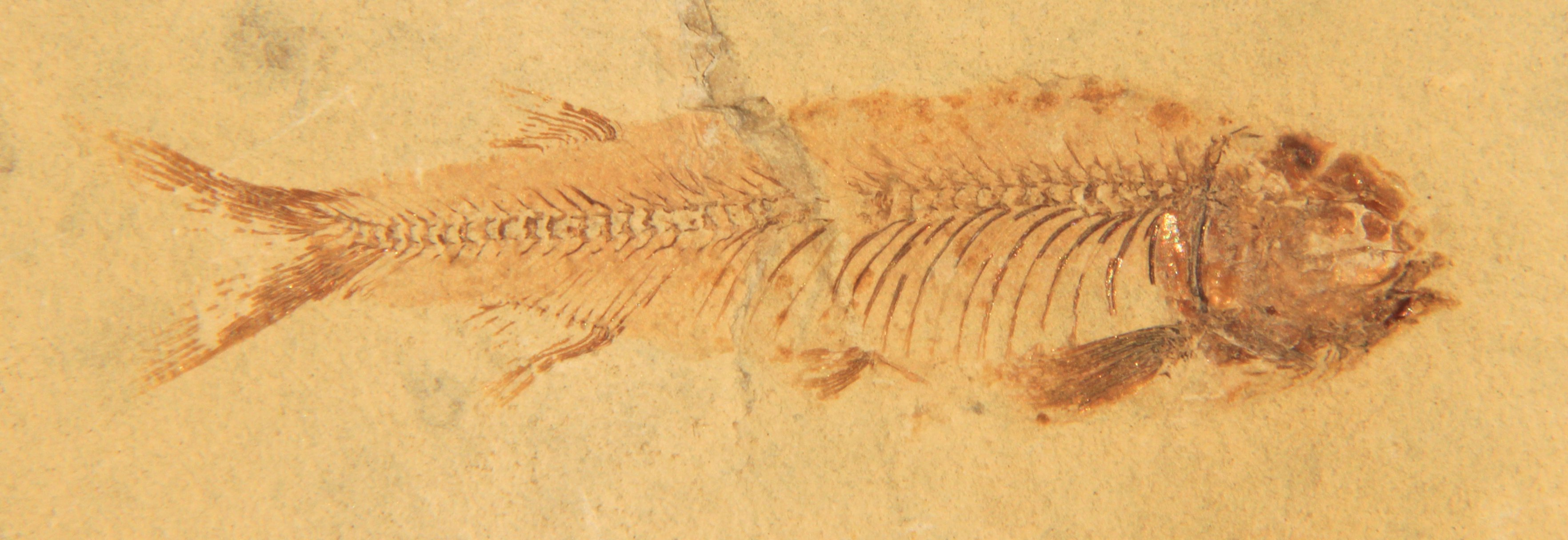
L. muroii, 53mm, collected near Jehol, Liaoning, China, Lower Cretaceous

Sixteen species of Lycoptera have been described, nine from the Jehol Group. The table below is based primarily on the valid species listed by Zhang and Jin in the 2008 book The Jehol Fossils.

Name	Author	Year	Status	Notes
Lycoptera middendorffi	Müller	1847	Valid, type species	
Lycoptera macrorhyncha	(Eichwald)	(1868)		
Lycoptera davidi	(Sauvage)	(1880)	Valid	
Lycoptera sinensis	Woodward	1901	Valid	
Lycoptera ferox	Grabau	1923		
Lycoptera chosenensis	Makiyama	1927		
Lycoptera kansuensis	Grabau	1928		
Lycoptera woodwardi	Grabau	1928		
Lycoptera jaholensis	Grabau	1928		
Lycoptera fragilis	Hussakof	1932	Valid	
Lycoptera takunagai	Seito	1936	Valid	
Lycoptera muroii	(Takai)	(1943)	Valid	
Lycoptera longicephalus	Liu et al.	1962	Valid	
Lycoptera lunteensis	Liu et al.	1962		
Lycoptera polyspondylus	Liu et al.	1962		
Lycoptera tungi	Liu et al.	1962		
Lycoptera wangi				
Lycoptera sankeyushuensis	(Ma & Sun)	(1988)	Valid	
Lycoptera fuxinensis	Zhang	2002	Valid	
