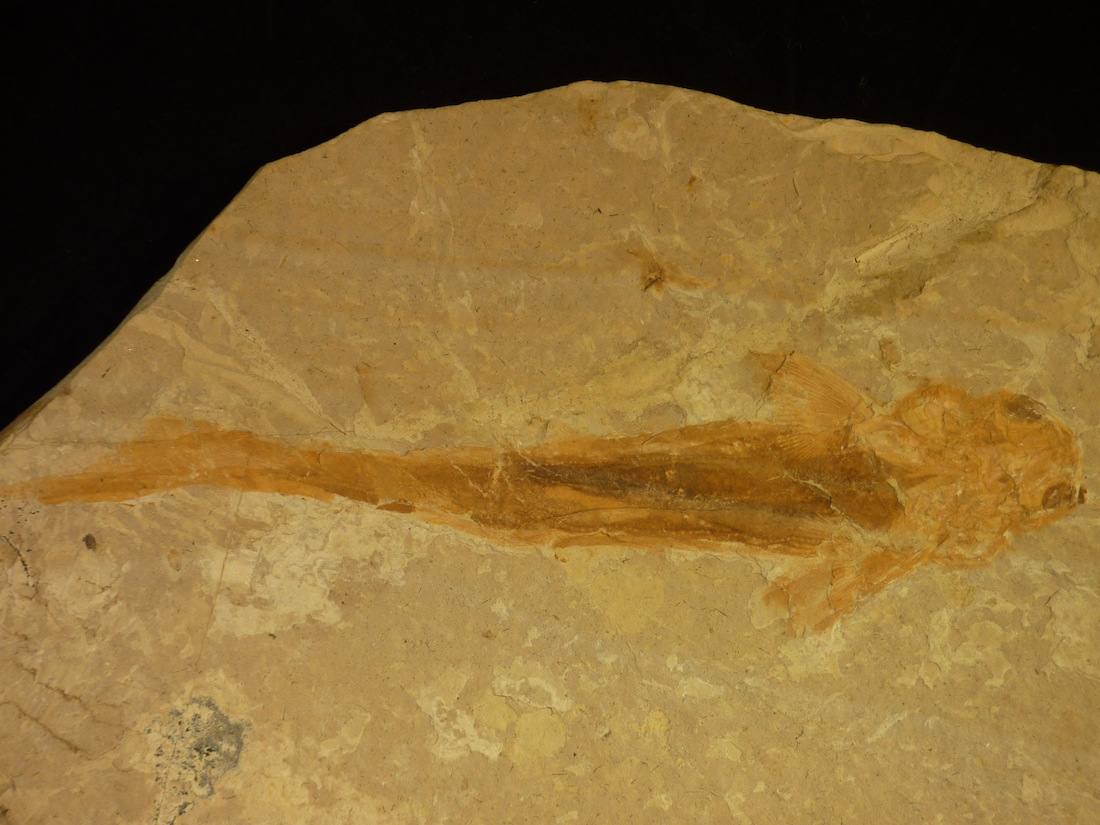
- Peipiaosteus pani prepared by Fossil Shack

Scientific classification
- Kingdom: Animalia
- Phylum: Chordata
- Class: Actinopterygii
- Order: Acipenseriformes
- Family: †Peipiaosteidae
- Genus: †Peipiaosteus; Liu & Zhou, 1965

Type species
- †Peipiaosteus pani Liu & Zhou, 1965

Other species
- †Peipiaosteus fengningensis Bai, 1983

= Peipiaosteus =

Peipiaosteus Temporal range: Aptian

Extinct genus of fishes

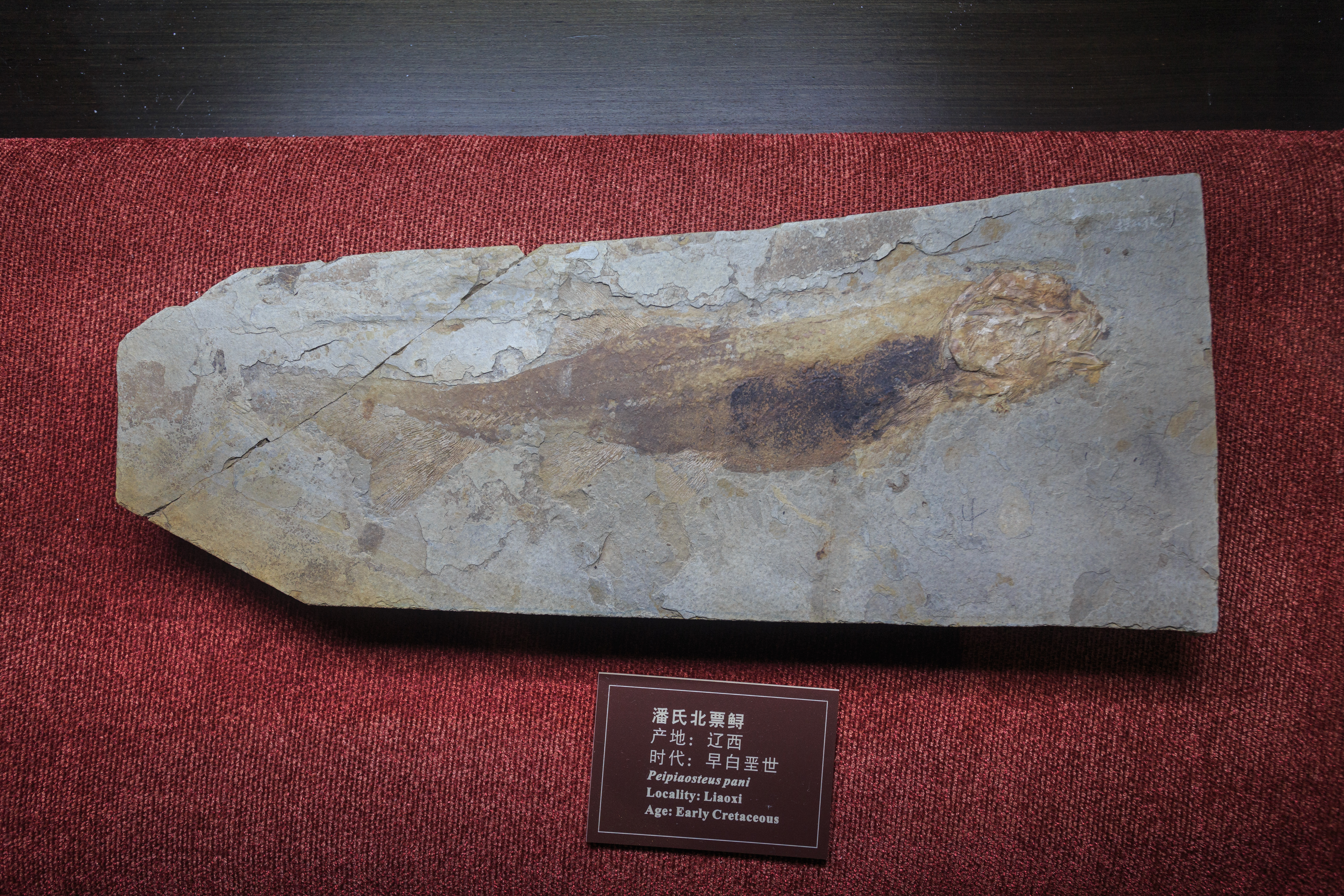
Peipiaosteus pani fossil

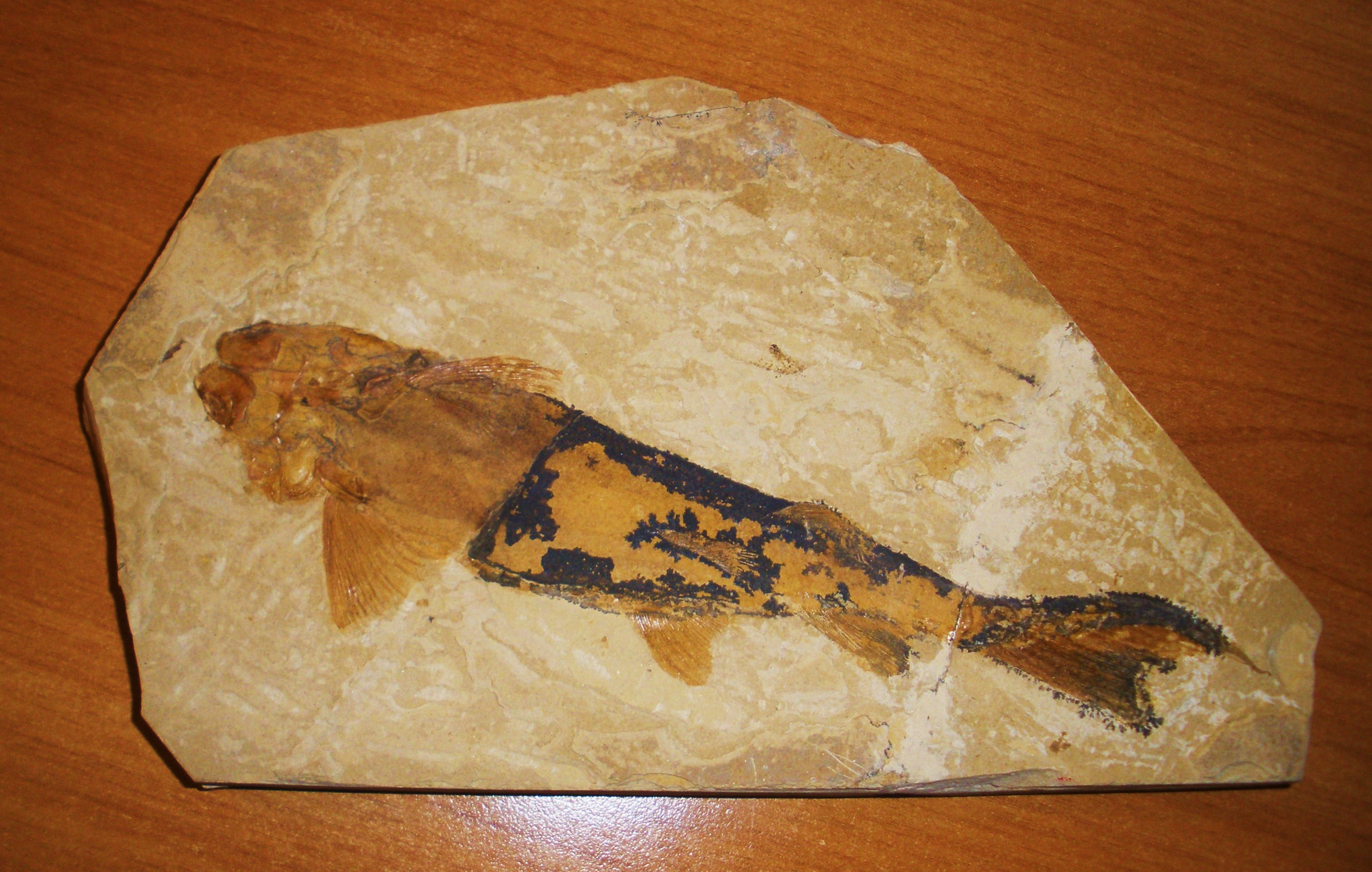
Peipiaosteus pani fossil

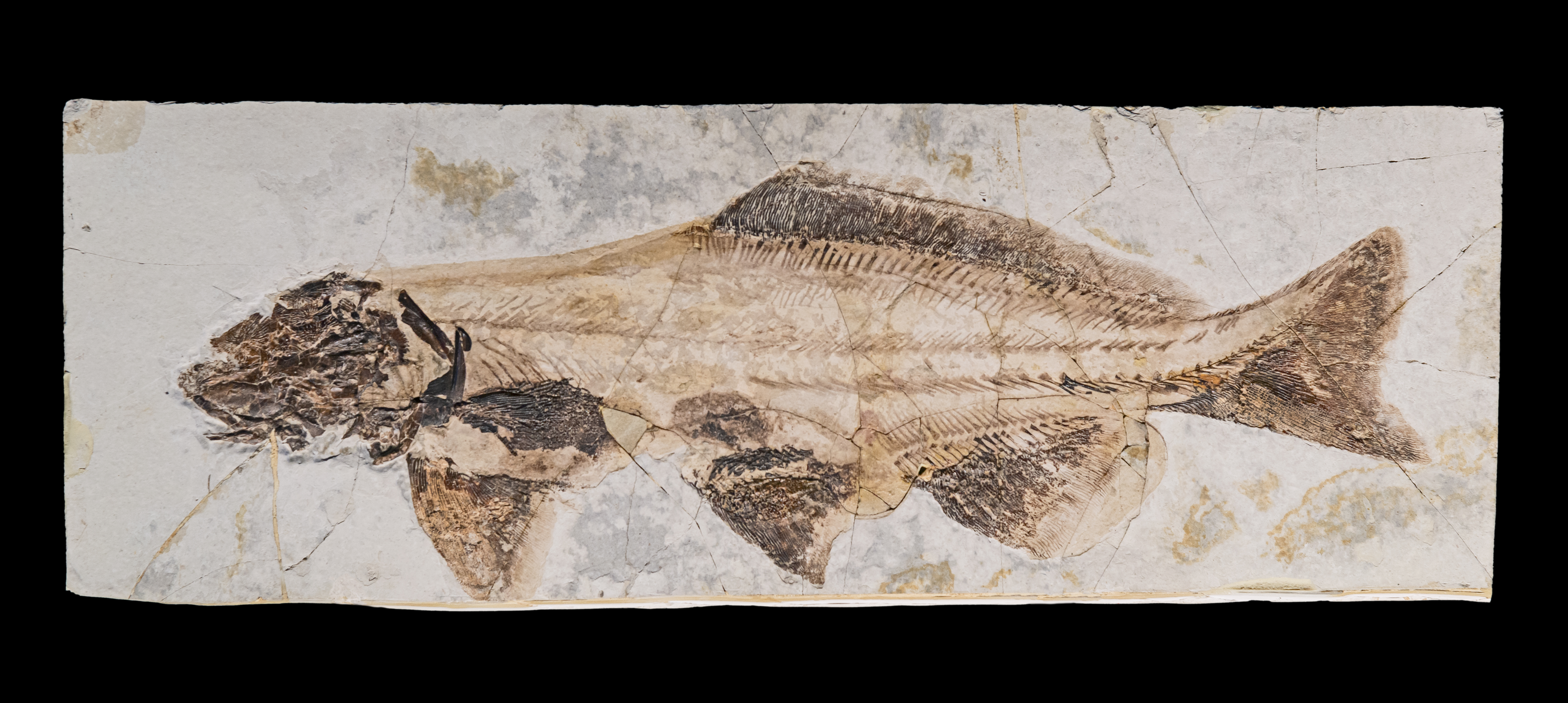
Fossil of the peipiaosteid Yanosteus longidorsalis (at MHNT), a close relative of Peipiaosteus

Peipiaosteus is an extinct genus of prehistoric chondrostean ray-finned fish. Its fossils are found in the Early Cretaceous Jiufotang Formation, Pani Lake, Liaoning Province, China.

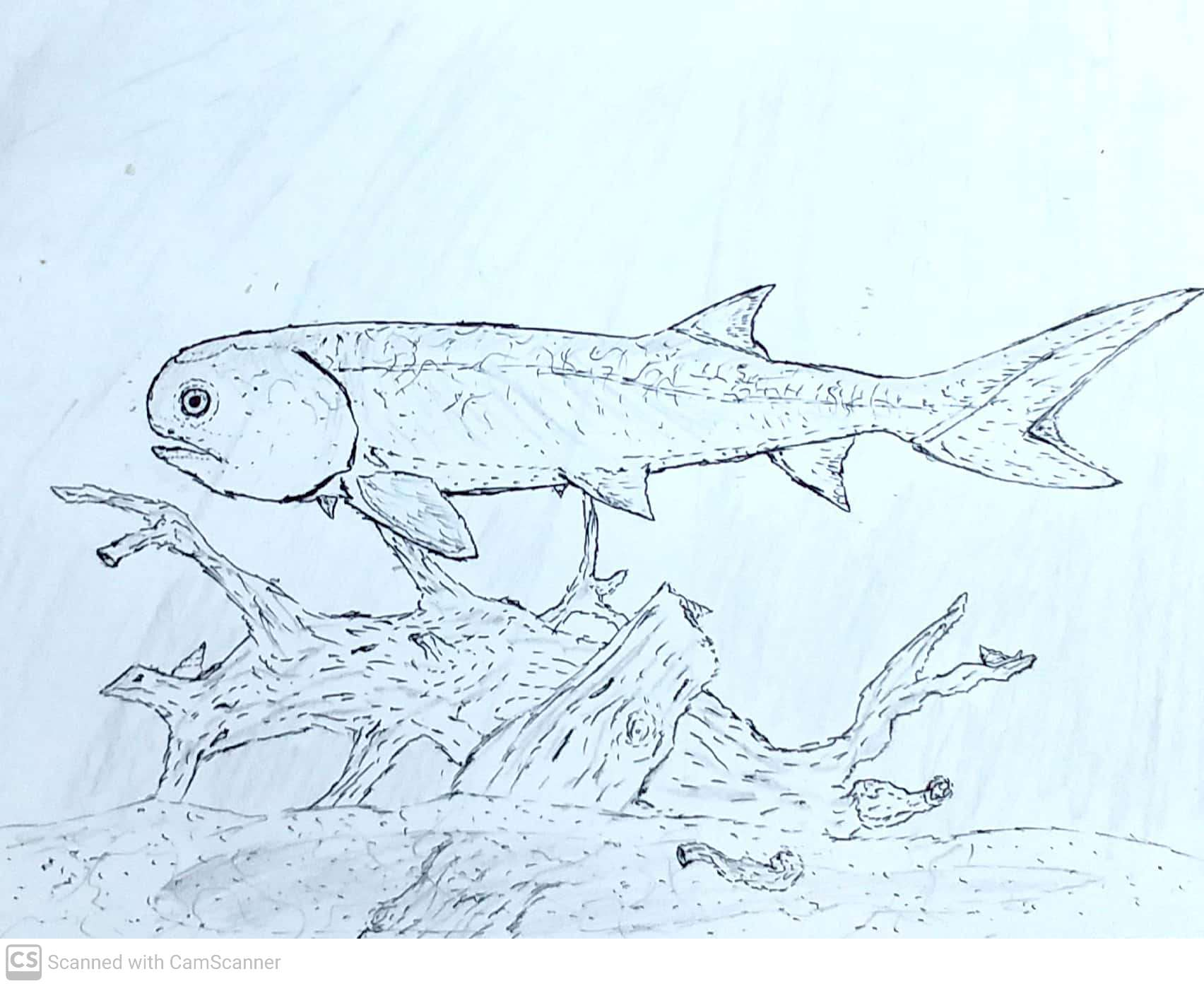
Reconstruction of Peipiaosteus pani

Peipiaosteus belongs to the family Peipiaosteidae, together with the genera Liaosteus, Spherosteus, Stichopterus, and Yanosteus. Peipiaosteidae lived in Asia (China, Kazakhstan, Mongolia, Russia) during the Late Jurassic and Early Cretaceous epochs. They are closely related to Chondrosteidae (Early Jurassic, Europe) and to living sturgeon and paddlefish (Acipenseroidei).

== See also ==
- Prehistoric fish
- List of prehistoric bony fish
