= 2014 in paleomammalogy =

This paleomammalogy list records new fossil mammal taxa that were described during the year 2014, as well as notes other significant paleomammalogy discoveries and events which occurred during that year.

== Non-eutherian mammals ==
=== Metatherians ===
Name	Novelty	Status	Authors	Age	Unit	Location	Notes	Images
Australohyaena	Gen. et comb. nov	Valid	Forasiepi, Babot & Zimicz	Late Oligocene (Deseadan)	Deseado Formation	Argentina	A borhyaenid; a new genus for "Borhyaena" antiqua Ameghino (1894).	
Balbaroo nalima	Sp. nov	Valid	Black et al.	Middle Miocene	Riversleigh World Heritage Area	Australia	A balbarid macropodiform, a species of Balbaroo.	B. nalima skull
Contrerascynus	Nom. nov	Valid	Mones	Miocene (Chasicoan)	Loma de las Tapias Formation	Argentina	A hathlyacynid sparassodont; a replacement name for Simpsonia Contreras (1990) (preoccupied).	
Crash	Gen. et sp. nov	Valid	Travouillon et al.	Middle Miocene	Riversleigh World Heritage Area	Australia	A peramelid bandicoot. The type species is Crash bandicoot.	Life restoration of Crash bandicoot
Ganguroo bites	Sp. nov	Valid	Travouillon et al.	Early Miocene	Riversleigh World Heritage Area	Australia	A basal member of Macropodidae, a species of Ganguroo.	
Golerdelphys	Gen. et sp. nov	Valid	Williamson & Lofgren	Late Paleocene (Tiffanian)	Goler Formation	United States	A herpetotheriid metatherian. The type species is Golerdelphys stocki.	
Hypsiprymnodon dennisi	Sp. nov	Valid	Bates et al.	Miocene	Riversleigh World Heritage Area	Australia	A relative of the musky rat-kangaroo.	
Hypsiprymnodon karenblackae	Sp. nov	Valid	Bates et al.	Miocene	Riversleigh World Heritage Area	Australia	A relative of the musky rat-kangaroo.	
Hypsiprymnodon philcreaseri	Sp. nov	Valid	Bates et al.	Miocene	Riversleigh World Heritage Area	Australia	A relative of the musky rat-kangaroo.	
Liyamayi	Gen. et sp. nov	Valid	Travouillon et al.	Middle Miocene	Riversleigh World Heritage Area	Australia	A relative of bilbies. The type species is Liyamayi dayi.	
Protolambda mcgilli	Sp. nov	Valid	Kelly	Latest Cretaceous?	Hell Creek Formation	United States	A pediomyid, a species of Protolambda.	

=== Others ===
Name	Novelty	Status	Authors	Age	Unit	Location	Notes	Images
Aliaga	Gen. et sp. et comb. nov	Valid	Cuenca-Bescós et al.	Early Cretaceous		Spain	A spalacotheriid "symmetrodont". The type species is Aliaga molinensis; genus might also contain "Spalacotherium" henkeli Krebs (1985).	
Anthracolestes	Gen. et sp. nov	Valid	Averianov, Martin & Lopatin	Middle Jurassic (Bathonian)	Itat Formation	Russia	A member of Dryolestidae. The type species is Anthracolestes sergeii.	
Barbatodon oardaensis	Sp. nov	Valid	Codrea et al.	Late Cretaceous (Maastrichtian)	Haţeg Basin	Romania	A kogaionid multituberculate, a species of Barbatodon.	
Bolodon hydei	Sp. nov	Valid	Cifelli, Davis & Sames	Late Berriasian or Valanginian	Lakota Formation	United States	A plagiaulacid multituberculate, a species of Bolodon.	
Chaoyangodens	Gen. et sp. nov	Valid	Hou & Meng	Early Cretaceous	Yixian Formation	China	A member of Eutriconodonta of uncertain phylogenetic placement. The type species is Chaoyangodens lii.	
Ectypodus arctos	Sp. nov	Valid	Beard & Dawson	Late early Eocene	Margaret Formation	Canada	A neoplagiaulacid multituberculate, a species of Ectypodus.	
Infernolestes	Gen. et sp. nov	Valid	Cifelli, Davis & Sames	Late Berriasian or Valanginian	Lakota Formation	United States	A spalacotheriid symmetrodontan. The type species is Infernolestes rougieri.	
Lakotalestes	Gen. et sp. nov	Valid	Cifelli, Davis & Sames	Late Berriasian or Valanginian	Lakota Formation	United States	A mammal of uncertain phylogenetic placement. Originally described as a dryolestid trechnotherian, but subsequently argued to be a possible member of Meridiolestida. The type species is Lakotalestes luoi.	
Megazostrodon chenali	Sp. nov	Valid	Debuysschere, Gheerbrant & Allain	Late Triassic (Rhaetian)		France	A morganucodont, a species of Megazostrodon.	
Passumys	Gen. et sp. nov	Valid	Cifelli, Davis & Sames	Late Berriasian or Valanginian	Lakota Formation	United States	An allodontoid multituberculate. The type species is Passumys angelli.	
Rosierodon	Gen. et sp. nov	Valid	Debuysschere, Gheerbrant & Allain	Late Triassic (Rhaetian)		France	A morganucodont. The type species is Rosierodon anceps.	
Shenshou	Gen. et sp. nov	Valid	Bi et al.	Late Jurassic (Oxfordian)	Tiaojishan Formation	China	A euharamiyidan allotherian of uncertain phylogenetic placement. The type species is Shenshou lui.	Life restoration of S. lui
Vintana	Gen. et sp. nov	Valid	Krause et al.	Late Cretaceous (Maastrichtian)	Maevarano Formation	Madagascar	A sudamericid gondwanatherian. The type species is Vintana sertichi.	Life restoration of V. sertichi
Xianshou	Gen. et 2 sp. nov	Valid	Bi et al.	Late Jurassic (Oxfordian)	Tiaojishan Formation	China	An eleutherodontid euharamiyidan allotherian. Genus contains two species: Xianshou linglong and Xianshou songae.	Skull reconstruction of X. linglong

== Newly named eutherians ==
=== Xenarthrans ===
Name	Novelty	Status	Authors	Age	Unit	Location	Notes	Images
Lakukullus	Gen. et sp. nov	Valid	Pujos et al.	Middle Miocene (Laventan)	Honda Group	Bolivia	A nothrotheriid sloth. The type species is Lakukullus anatisrostratus.	
Mesopotamocnus	Gen. et comb. nov	Valid	Brandoni	Miocene (Tortonian)	Ituzaingó Formation	Argentina	A megalonychid sloth; a new genus for "Ortotherium" brevirostrum" Bordas, 1942.	
Pliodasypus	Gen. et sp. nov	Valid	Castro et al.	Middle Pliocene	San Gregorio Formation	Venezuela	An armadillo related to the species assigned to the genus Dasypus. The type species is Pliodasypus vergelianus.	

=== Afrotherians ===
Name	Novelty	Status	Authors	Age	Unit	Location	Notes	Images
Anancus arvernensis mencalensis	Subsp. nov	Valid	Garrido & Arribas	Early Pleistocene		Spain	A gomphothere, a subspecies of Anancus arvernensis.	
Brevirhynchocyon	Nom. nov	Valid	Senut & Georgalis	Miocene		Namibia	An elephant shrew; a replacement name for Brachyrhynchocyon Senut, 2008 (preoccupied).	
Metaxytherium albifontanum	Sp. nov	Valid	Vélez-Juarbe & Domning	Late Oligocene		United States	A halitheriine dugongid, a species of Metaxytherium.	Neogene dugongs, including M. albifontanum
Ocepeia grandis	Sp. nov Fam. nov.	Valid	Gheerbrant in Gheerbrant et al.	Paleocene (Thanetian)	Ouled Abdoun Basin	Morocco	An afrotherian of uncertain phylogenetic placement, probably related to the clade Paenungulata. With description of new material of O. daouiensis and erection of the monotypic family Ocepeiidae, Ocepeia becomes the oldest known Afrotherian skull and best-known African mammal of the Paleocene.	O. grandis dentary
Palaeoloxodon lomolinoi	Sp. nov	Valid	van der Geer et al.	Late Pleistocene		Greece	A member of Elephantidae, a species of Palaeoloxodon.	
Priscosiren	Gen. et sp. nov	Valid	Vélez-Juarbe & Domning	Early Oligocene		United States (Puerto Rico and South Carolina)	A halitheriine dugongid. The type species is Priscosiren atlantica.	

=== Bats ===
Name	Novelty	Status	Authors	Age	Unit	Location	Notes	Images
Corbarhina	Gen. et sp. nov	Valid	Sigé et al.	Early Miocene		France	A rhinopomatid bat. The type species is Corbarhina handae.	
Cuvierimops legendrei	Sp. nov	Valid	Maitre	Early Oligocene		France	A free-tailed bat, a species of Cuvierimops.	
Cuvierimops parisiensis intermedius	Subsp. nov	Valid	Maitre	Late Eocene		France	A free-tailed bat, a subspecies of Cuvierimops parisiensis.	
Cuvierimops parisiensis priscus	Subsp. nov	Valid	Maitre	Late Eocene		France	A free-tailed bat, a subspecies of Cuvierimops parisiensis.	
Hipposideros (Pseudorhinolophus) major	Sp. nov	Valid	Maitre	Late Eocene to early Oligocene		France	A member of Hipposideridae, a species of Hipposideros.	
Hipposideros (Pseudorhinolophus) morloti sequens	Subsp. nov	Valid	Maitre	Late Eocene to early Oligocene		France	A member of Hipposideridae, a subspecies of Hipposideros morloti.	
Hipposideros (Pseudorhinolophus) russelli	Sp. nov	Valid	Maitre	Late Eocene		France	A member of Hipposideridae, a species of Hipposideros.	
Hipposideros (Pseudorhinolophus) schlosseri salemensis	Subsp. nov	Valid	Maitre	Late Eocene		France	A member of Hipposideridae, a subspecies of Hipposideros schlosseri.	
Hipposideros (Pseudorhinolophus) tenuis	Sp. nov	Valid	Maitre	Late Eocene		France	A member of Hipposideridae, a species of Hipposideros.	
Palaeophyllophora nova	Sp. nov	Valid	Maitre	Early Oligocene		France	A member of Hipposideridae, a species of Palaeophyllophora.	
Palaeophyllophora parva	Sp. nov	Valid	Maitre	Late Eocene to early Oligocene		France	A member of Hipposideridae, a species of Palaeophyllophora.	
Palaeophyllophora rosierensis	Sp. nov	Valid	Maitre	Late Eocene to early Oligocene		France	A member of Hipposideridae, a species of Palaeophyllophora.	
Phasmatonycteris	Gen. et 2 sp. nov		Gunnell, Simmons & Seiffert	Late Eocene (Priabonian) to early Oligocene (Rupelian)	Birket Qarun Formation; Jebel Qatrani Formation	Egypt	A myzopodid bat. Genus contains two species: Phasmatonycteris phiomensis and Phasmatonycteris butleri (the type species was not designated).	
Pipistrellus semenovi	Sp. nov	Valid	Rosina & Sinitsa	Miocene (early Turolian)		Ukraine	A vesper bat, a species of Pipistrellus.	
Protorhinolophus	Gen. et sp. nov	Valid	Ravel et al.	Middle Eocene		China	A horseshoe bat. The type species is Protorhinolophus shanghuangensis.	
Stehlinia alia	Sp. nov	Valid	Maitre	Middle Eocene		France	A member of Palaeochiropterygidae, a species of Stehlinia.	
Stehlinia gracilis mutans	Subsp. nov	Valid	Maitre	Late Eocene to Oligocene		France	A member of Palaeochiropterygidae, a subspecies of Stehlinia gracilis.	
Stehlinia revilliodi	Sp. nov	Valid	Maitre	Middle Eocene		France; Switzerland	A member of Palaeochiropterygidae, a species of Stehlinia.	
Vaylatsia astruci	Sp. nov	Valid	Maitre	Late Eocene		France	A member of Hipposideridae, a species of Vaylatsia.	
Vaylatsia cregolensis	Sp. nov	Valid	Maitre	Late Eocene		France	A member of Hipposideridae, a species of Vaylatsia.	
Vaylatsia frequens	Sp. nov	Valid	Maitre	Late Eocene to early Oligocene		France	A member of Hipposideridae, a species of Vaylatsia.	
Vaylatsia pelissiei	Sp. nov	Valid	Maitre	Early Oligocene		France	A member of Hipposideridae, a species of Vaylatsia.	
Vaylatsia valettei	Sp. nov	Valid	Maitre	Late Eocene		France	A member of Hipposideridae, a species of Vaylatsia.	
Vespertiliavus disjunctus	Sp. et 2 subsp. nov	Valid	Maitre	Eocene to Oligocene		France	A sac-winged bat, a species of Vespertiliavus. The species contains two subspecies: Vespertiliavus disjunctus disjunctus and Vespertiliavus disjunctus nauzensis.	
Vespertiliavus (Sigeia) lizierensis	Subgen. et sp. nov	Valid	Maitre	Late Eocene		France	A sac-winged bat, a species of Vespertiliavus.	
Vespertiliavus (Sigeia) recens	Sp. nov	Valid	Maitre	Early Oligocene		France	A sac-winged bat, a species of Vespertiliavus.	

=== Odd-toed ungulates ===
Name	Novelty	Status	Authors	Age	Unit	Location	Notes	Images
Acerorhinus neleus	Sp. nov	Valid	Athanassiou et al.	Late Miocene		Greece	A rhinoceros, a species of Acerorhinus.	
Epiaceratherium naduongense	Sp. nov	Valid	Böhme et al.	Late Eocene		Vietnam	A member of Rhinocerotidae, a species of Epiceratherium.	
Equus cedralensis	Sp. nov.	Disputed	Alberdi et al.	Late Pleistocene (Rancholabrean)		Mexico	A member of Equidae. Originally described as a species of Equus; considered to be a junior synonym of Haringtonhippus francisci by Jiménez-Hidalgo & Díaz-Sibaja (2020).	
Ghazijhippus	Gen. et sp. nov	Valid	Missiaen & Gingerich	Eocene (Ypresian)	Ghazij Formation	Pakistan	An odd-toed ungulate of uncertain phylogenetic placement; considered to be a basal member of the family Equidae by Bai, Wang & Meng (2018). The type species is Ghazijhippus talibhasani.	
Hipparion phlegrae	Sp. nov	Valid	Lazaridis & Tsoukala	Turolian		Greece	A member of Equidae, a species of Hipparion.	
Meridiolophus	Gen. et sp. nov.	Valid	Bai et al.	Early Eocene	Huayong Formation	China	A member of (probably non-monophyletic) family 'Isectolophidae'; a basal member of Tapiromorpha. The type species is Meridiolophus expansus.	
Nestoritherium fuguense	Sp. nov	Valid	Xue et al.	Late Miocene	Lamagou Formation	China	A chalicothere, a species of Nestoritherium.	
Perissobune	Gen. et 2 sp. nov	Valid	Missiaen & Gingerich	Eocene (Ypresian)	Ghazij Formation	Pakistan	An odd-toed ungulate of uncertain phylogenetic placement. The type species is Perissobune intizarkhani; genus also contains Perissobune munirulhaqi.	
Pliohippus potosinus	Sp. nov	Valid	Ferrusquía-Villafranca et al.	Late Miocene		Mexico	A member of Equidae, a species of Pliohippus.	
Rhinoceros fusuiensis	Sp. nov	Valid	Yan et al.	Early Pleistocene		China	A rhinoceros, initially described as a species of Rhinoceros, later transferred to Dicerorhinus.	

=== Even-toed ungulates ===
Name	Novelty	Status	Authors	Age	Unit	Location	Notes	Images
Afromeryx grex	Sp. nov	Disputed	Miller et al.	Early Miocene	Wadi Moghra site	Egypt	A member of Anthracotheriidae. Originally described as a species of Afromeryx; Pickford (2025) considered it to be a junior synonym of Mogharameryx mogharensis.	
Afromeryx palustris	Sp. nov	Valid	Miller et al.	Early Miocene	Wadi Moghra site	Egypt	A member of Anthracotheriidae. Originally described as a species of Afromeryx, but subsequently transferred to the genus Masrimeryx.	
Antilope intermedia	Sp. nov	Valid	Khan & Akhtar	Late Pliocene	Tatrot Formation	Pakistan	An antelope related to the blackbuck.	
Bakalovia orientalis	Sp. nov	Valid	Böhme et al.	Middle Eocene to Late Eocene		Vietnam	A member of Anthracotheriidae, a species of Bakalovia.	
Bubalus brevicornis chowi	Subsp. nov	Valid	Dong et al.	Early Pleistocene		China	A bovine, a subspecies of Bubalus brevicornis.	
Camelus grattardi	Sp. nov	Valid	Geraads	Early Pleistocene	Shungura Formation	Ethiopia	A camel.	
Chleuastochoerus linxiaensis	Sp. nov	Valid	Hou & Deng	Late Miocene	Liushu Formation	China	A member of Suidae, a species of Chleuastochoerus.	
Eostyloceros hezhengensis	Sp. nov	Valid	Deng et al.	Late Miocene	Liushu Formation	China	A deer, a species of Eostyloceros.	
Gagadon	Gen. et sp. nov	Valid	Stucky & Covert	Early Eocene (Ypresian)	Wasatch Formation	United States	A homacodontid. The type species is Gagadon minimonstrum.	
Hoplitomeryx devosi	Sp. nov	Disputed	Van der Geer	Late Miocene		Italy	A hoplitomerycid cervoid (relative of deers), a species of Hoplitomeryx. Mazza et al. (2016) considered the species to be based on dubious body mass calculations and size class scoring.	
Hoplitomeryx kriegsmani	Sp. nov	Disputed	Van der Geer	Late Miocene		Italy	A hoplitomerycid cervoid (relative of deers), a species of Hoplitomeryx. Mazza et al. (2016) considered the species to be based on dubious body mass calculations and size class scoring.	
Hoplitomeryx macpheei	Sp. nov	Disputed	Van der Geer	Late Miocene		Italy	A hoplitomerycid cervoid (relative of deers), a species of Hoplitomeryx. Mazza et al. (2016) considered the species to be based on dubious body mass calculations and size class scoring.	
Jaggermeryx	Gen. et sp. nov	Valid	Miller et al.	Early Miocene	Wadi Moghra site	Egypt	A member of Anthracotheriidae. The type species is Jaggermeryx naida. Pickford & Gawad (2025) considered J. naida to be synonymous with "Brachyodus" africanus Andrews (1899), resulting in a new combination Jaggermeryx africanus.	Life restoration of Jaggermeryx naida
Lagomeryx manai	Sp. nov	Valid	Suraprasit et al.	Late middle Miocene	Mae Moh Basin	Thailand	A lagomerycine deer, a species of Lagomeryx.	
Libycosaurus bahri	Sp. nov	Valid	Lihoreau et al.	Late Miocene		Chad	A member of Anthracotheriidae, a species of Libycosaurus.	
Megaloceros novocarthaginiensis	Sp. nov	Valid	Van der Made	Early Pleistocene		Spain	A species of Megaloceros.	
Mosaicomeryx	Gen. et comb. nov	Valid	Mennecart & Métais	Oligocene		France; Pakistan; Switzerland	A stem-pecoran; a new genus for "Gelocus" quercyi Jehenne (1987).	
Muntiacus zhaotongensis	Sp. nov	Valid	Dong et al.	Late Miocene		China	A muntjac.	
Nyanzachoerus khinzir	Sp. nov	Valid	Boisserie et al.	Late Miocene	Toros-Ménalla fossiliferous area	Chad	A tetraconodontine suid, a species of Nyanzachoerus.	N. khinzir
Retroporcus complutensis	Sp. nov	Valid	Pickford & Laurent	Miocene		Serbia; Spain	A tetraconodontine suid.	
Scontromeryx	Gen. et comb. et sp. nov	Disputed	Van der Geer	Late Miocene		Italy	A hoplitomerycid cervoid (relative of deers). A new genus for "Hoplitomeryx" minutus Mazza & Rustioni, 2011; genus also contains "H." falcidens Mazza & Rustioni, 2011, "H." apulicus Mazza & Rustioni, 2011, "H." apruthiensis Mazza & Rustioni, 2011, "H." magnus Mazza & Rustioni, 2011 and a new species Scontromeryx mazzai. Mazza et al. (2016) considered the genus Scontromeryx to be invalid and the species S. mazzai to be imperfectly defined.	
Shaanxispira linxiaensis	Sp. nov	Valid	Shi et al.	Upper Miocene		China	A member of Bovidae, possibly a member of Ovibovini; a species of Shaanxispira.	
Stephanocemas guangheensis	Sp. nov	Valid	Deng et al.	Middle Miocene	Dongxiang Formation	China	A lagomerycine stem-deer. Originally described as a species of Stephanocemas, but subsequently transferred to the genus Loxomeryx.	
Surameryx	Gen. et sp. nov	Disputed	Prothero et al.	Late Miocene or Quaternary	Madre de Dios Formation	Border between Bolivia and Brazil	Originally described as a dromomerycine palaeomerycid. The type species is Surameryx acrensis. Gasparini et al. (2021) reinterpreted S. woodburnei as described on the basis of fossils of a deer.	
Sus xiaozhu wenzhongi	Subsp. nov	Valid	Dong et al.	Middle-Late Pleistocene		China	A pig, a subspecies of Sus xiaozhu.	
Tsaidamotherium brevirostrum	Sp. nov	Valid	Shi	Late Miocene	Liushu Formation	China	An ovibovine bovid, a species of Tsaidamotherium.	
Versoporcus	Gen. et comb. nov	Valid	Pickford	Miocene		Austria; France; Germany; Poland; Spain; Switzerland	A tetraconodontine suid. The type species is Versoporcus steinheimensis (Fraas 1870); genus also includes Versoporcus grivensis (Gaillard 1899).	

=== Cetaceans ===
Name	Novelty	Status	Authors	Age	Unit	Location	Notes	Images
Brandtocetus	Gen. et sp. nov	Valid	Gol'din & Startsev	Late Miocene	Chersonian Formation	Ukraine	A cetotheriid baleen whale. The type species is Brandtocetus chongulek.	Skull of B. chongulek
Cotylocara	Gen. et sp. nov	Valid	Geisler, Colbert & Carew	Oligocene		United States	An odontocete. The type species is Cotylocara macei.	Life restoration of C. macei
Dhedacetus	Gen. et sp. nov	Valid	Bajpai & Thewissen	Eocene	Harudi Formation	India	A member of Protocetidae. The type species is Dhedacetus hyaeni.	
Eodelphinus	Gen. et comb. nov	Valid	Murakami et al.	Late Miocene	Mashike Formation	Japan	An oceanic dolphin. A new genus for "Stenella" kabatensis Horikawa, 1977.	
Herentalia	Gen. et sp. nov	Valid	Bisconti	Miocene		Belgium	A cetotheriid baleen whale. The type species is Herentalia nigra.	
Herpetocetus morrowi	Sp. nov	Valid	El Adli, Deméré & Boessenecker	Late Pliocene		United States	A cetotheriid baleen whale, a species of Herpetocetus.	
Huaridelphis	Gen. et sp. nov	Valid	Lambert, Bianucci & Urbina	Early Miocene	Chilcatay Formation	Peru	A river dolphin, a member of Squalodelphinidae. The type species is Huaridelphis raimondii.	
Kentriodon diusinus	Sp. nov	Valid	Salinas-Márquez et al.	Middle Miocene	Rosarito Beach Formation	Mexico	A kentriodontid delphinoid, a species of Kentriodon.	
Kentriodon hoepfneri	Sp. nov	Valid	Kazár & Hampe	Middle or Late Miocene		Germany	A kentriodontid delphinoid, a species of Kentriodon.	
Kharodacetus	Gen. et comb. nov	Valid	Bajpai & Thewissen	Eocene	Harudi Formation	India	A member of Protocetidae; a new genus for "Gaviacetus" sahni Bajpai & Thewissen (1998).	Mandible of K. sahni
Otekaikea	Gen. et comb. nov	Valid	Tanaka & Fordyce	Late Oligocene	Otekaike Limestone	New Zealand	A relative of Waipatia maerewhenua and the South Asian river dolphin; a new genus for "Prosqualodon" marplesi Dickson (1964).	Reconstructed skull of O. marplesi
Papahu	Gen. et sp. nov	Valid	Aguirre-Fernández & Fordyce	Early Miocene	Kaipuke Formation	New Zealand	A dolphin. The type species is Papahu taitapu.	
Semirostrum	Gen. et sp. nov	Valid	Racicot, Deméré, Beatty & Boessenecker	Pliocene		United States	A porpoise. The type species is Semirostrum ceruttii.	S. cerruttii rostrum
Togocetus	Gen. et sp. nov	Valid	Gingerich & Cappetta	Eocene (middle Lutetian)		Togo	A protocetid cetacean. The type species is Togocetus traversei.	
Tohoraata	Gen. et sp. et comb. nov	Valid	Boessenecker & Fordyce	Late Oligocene		New Zealand	An eomysticetid baleen whale. The type species is Tohoraata raekohao; genus also contains "Mauicetus" waitakiensis Marples (1956).	
Zygiocetus	Gen. et sp. nov	Valid	Tarasenko	Late Miocene		Russia	A cetotheriid. The type species is Zygiocetus nartorum.	

=== Carnivorans ===
Name	Novelty	Status	Authors	Age	Unit	Location	Notes	Images
Eucyon kuta	Sp. nov	Valid	Werdelin, Lewis & Haile-Selassie	Pliocene		Ethiopia	A member of Canidae, a species belonging to the (paraphyletic) genus Eucyon.	
Gryphoca nordica	Sp. nov	Valid	Koretsky, Rahmat & Peters	Late Miocene to early Pliocene		Denmark; Netherlands	A phocine earless seal, a species of Gryphoca.	
Metailurus ultimus	Sp. nov	Valid	Li	Late Pliocene	Mazegou Formation	China	A member of Felidae, a species of Metailurus.	
Panthera blytheae	Sp. nov	Valid	Tseng et al.	Late Miocene to early Pliocene	Zanda Formation	China	A pantherine felid. Originally described as a species of Panthera; Hemmer (2023) transferred it to the genus Palaeopanthera.	
Platyphoca danica	Sp. nov	Valid	Koretsky, Rahmat & Peters	Miocene (early-middle Tortonian)	Gram Formation	Denmark	A phocine earless seal, a species of Platyphoca.	
Pontophoca jutlandica	Sp. nov	Valid	Koretsky, Rahmat & Peters	Miocene (early-middle Tortonian)	Gram Formation	Denmark	A monachine earless seal, a species of Pontophoca.	
Ursavus tedfordi	Sp. nov	Valid	Qiu, Deng & Wang	Late Miocene (late Bahean)	Liushu Formation	China	An ursine bear, a species of Ursavus.	
Vulpes qiuzhudingi	Sp. nov	Valid	Wang et al.	Early Pliocene	Kunlun Pass Basin; Zanda Basin	China	A fox related to the Arctic fox.	
Yunnanotherium	Gen. et sp. et comb. nov	Junior homonym	Qi	Late Miocene		China	Originally described as a meline mustelid. The type species is Yunnanotherium lufengense; genus also contains "Trochotherium" yuanmouense Zong (1997). The generic name is preoccupied by Yunnanotherium Han (1986); Deshmukh & Valenciano (2022) coined a replacement name Neoyunnanotherium, and reinterpreted is as a member of the family Mephitidae.	

=== Rodents ===
Name	Novelty	Status	Authors	Age	Unit	Location	Notes	Images
Acrolophomys	Gen. et sp. nov	Valid	Kelly & Whistler	Late Miocene	Dove Spring Formation	United States	A cricetid rodent. The type species is Acrolophomys rhodopetros.	
Antecalomys coxae	Sp. nov	Valid	Kelly & Whistler	Late Miocene	Dove Spring Formation	United States	A cricetid rodent, a species of Antecalomys.	
Changquin	Gen. et sp. nov	Valid	Vucetich et al.	Late Oligocene (Deseadan)	Sarmiento Formation	Argentina	An acaremyid octodontoid caviomorph. The type species is Changquin woodi.	
Comtia	Gen. et sp. et comb. nov	Valid	Vianey-Liaud in Vianey-Liaud et al.	Oligocene (early Chattian), possibly also early Miocene		France; Germany?	A member of Sciuridae. The type species is Comtia bernardi Vianey-Liaud in Vianey-Liaud et al. (2014); genus might also contain "Sciurus" giganteus Freudenberg (1941).	
Cordimus	Gen. et 3 sp. nov	Valid	Zijlstra et al.	Late Pliocene or early Pleistocene to Holocene		Bonaire; Curaçao	A cricetid rodent. Genus contains three species: Cordimus hooijeri, Cordimus debuisonjei and Cordimus raton.	
Cricetodon nievei	Sp. nov	Valid	López-Guerrero et al.	Middle Miocene		Spain	A cricetodontine cricetid, a species of Cricetodon.	
Douglassciurus bjorki	Sp. nov	Valid	Korth	Oligocene (Whitneyan)		United States	A sciurid rodent, a species of Douglassciurus.	
Dudumus	Gen. et sp. nov	Valid	Arnal et al.	Early Miocene	Sarmiento Formation	Argentina	An octodontoid caviomorph rodent. The type species is Dudumus ruigomezi.	
Eospalax lingtaiensis	Sp. nov	Valid	Liu et al.	Late Pliocene to Early Pleistocene		China	A zokor, a species of Eospalax.	
Eospalax simplicidens	Sp. nov	Valid	Liu et al.	Late Pliocene to Early Pleistocene		China	A zokor, a species of Eospalax.	
Heosminthus borrae	Sp. nov	Valid	Daxner-Höck, Badamgarav & Maridet	Oligocene to early Miocene	Hsanda Gol Formation	Mongolia	A dipodid rodent, a species of Heosminthus.	
Heosminthus chimidae	Sp. nov	Valid	Daxner-Höck, Badamgarav & Maridet	Oligocene	Hsanda Gol Formation	Mongolia	A dipodid rodent, a species of Heosminthus.	
Lindsaymys	Gen. et sp. nov	Valid	Kelly & Whistler	Late Miocene	Dove Spring Formation	United States	A cricetid rodent. The type species is Lindsaymys takeuchii.	
Lophocricetus cimishliensis	Sp. nov	Valid	Delinschi	Late Miocene (middle Turolian)	Balta Formation	Moldova	A member of Dipodidae, a species of Lophocricetus.	
Maxomys pliosurifer	Sp. nov	Valid	Nishioka et al.	Late Pliocene		Myanmar	A murid; a species of Maxomys.	
Megacricetodon yenicekentensis	Sp. nov	Valid	Erten, Sen & Görmüş	Miocene		Turkey	A cricetid, a species of Megacricetodon.	
Niedemys	Gen. et sp. nov	Valid	Kerber et al.	Late Quaternary		Brazil	A chinchilloid caviomorph, possibly a dinomyid. The type species is Niedemys piauiensis.	
Onjosminthus	Gen. et sp. nov	Valid	Daxner-Höck, Badamgarav & Maridet	Early Oligocene	Hsanda Gol Formation	Mongolia	A dipodid rodent. The type species is Onjosminthus baindi.	
Paciculus cedrus	Sp. nov	Valid	Korth	Oligocene (Whitneyan)		United States	A cricetid rodent, a species of Paciculus.	
Plesiosminthus olzi	Sp. nov	Valid	Daxner-Höck, Badamgarav & Maridet	Early Miocene	Loh Formation	Mongolia	A dipodid rodent, a species of Plesiosminthus.	
Primoprismus	Gen. et sp. nov	Valid	Maridet et al.	Early Miocene		China	A microtoid cricetid. The type species is Primoprismus fejfari.	
Protophiomys tunisiensis	Sp. nov	Valid	Marivaux et al.	Eocene (Bartonian)		Tunisia	A member of Hystricognathi, a species of Protophiomys.	
Qaidamomys	Gen. et sp. nov	Valid	Li & Wang	Late Miocene		China	A murid. The type species is Qaidamomys fortelii	
Reigechimys simplex	Sp. nov	Valid	Sostillo, Montalvo & Verzi	Late Miocene (Huayquerian)	Cerro Azul Formation	Argentina	An echimyid, a species of Reigechimys.	
Reigomys	Gen. et comb. nov	Valid	Machado et al.	Pleistocene	Tarija Formation	Bolivia	An oryzomyine rodent; a new genus for "Holochilus" primigenus Steppan (1996).	
Rotundomys intimus	Sp. nov	Valid	López-Antoñanzas, Peláez-Campomanes & Álvarez-Sierra	Late Miocene		Spain	A cricetid rodent, a species of Rotundomys.	
Vasseuromys bergasensis	Sp. nov	Valid	Ruiz-Sánchez et al.	Late Oligocene		Spain	A dormouse, a species of Vasseuromys.	

=== Primates and plesiadapiforms ===
Name	Novelty	Status	Authors	Age	Unit	Location	Notes	Images
Amamria	Gen. et sp. nov	Valid	Marivaux et al.	Eocene (Bartonian)		Tunisia	An early simian or a relative of simians. The type species is Amamria tunisiensis.	
Nannodectes lynasi	Sp. nov	Valid	Lofgren et al.	Paleocene	Goler Formation	United States	A plesiadapid, a species of Nannodectes.	
Notnamaia	Nom. nov	Valid	Pickford & Uhen	Eocene (Lutetian)		Namibia	Probably a member of the family Adapidae; a replacement name for Namaia Pickford et al., 2008 (preoccupied).	
Pandemonium hibernalis	Sp. nov	Valid	Fox et al.	Paleocene (Puercan)	Scollard Formation	Canada	A plesiadapiform, a species of Pandemonium.	
Ursolestes	Gen. et sp. nov	Valid	Fox, Scott & Buckley	Paleocene (middle/late Puercan)		United States	A plesiadapiform related to Purgatorius. The type species is Ursolestes perpetior.	

=== Others ===
Name	Novelty	Status	Authors	Age	Unit	Location	Notes	Images
Aatotomus	Gen. et sp. nov	Valid	Rankin	Late Paleocene	Ravenscrag Formation	Canada	A member of Pantolestidae. The type species is Aatotomus placochton.	
Aceroryctes	Gen. et sp. nov	Valid	Rankin & Holroyd	Eocene (early Wasatchian)	Wasatch Formation	United States	A member of Palaeoryctidae. The type species is Aceroryctes dulcis.	
Afrophoca	Gen. et sp. nov	Disputed	Koretsky & Domning	Early to middle Miocene	Marada Formation	Libya	A placental mammal of uncertain affinities. The type species is Afrophoca libyca. Originally described as a monachine earless seal; Pickford & De Muizon (2024) reinterpreted its holotype as a bone of the anthracothere Afromeryx zelteni.	
Antofagastia	Gen. et sp. nov	Valid	García-López & Babot	Late Eocene	Geste Formation	Argentina	An interatheriid notoungulate. The type species is Antofagastia turneri.	
Asmodeus petrasnerus	Sp. nov	Valid	Seoane & Cerdeño	Late Oligocene (Deseadan)	Agua de la Piedra Formation	Argentina	A homalodotheriid notoungulate, a species of Asmodeus.	
Bessoecetor krausei	Sp. nov	Valid	Rankin	Late Paleocene	Ravenscrag Formation	Canada	A member of Pantolestidae, a species of Bessoecetor.	
Boritia	Gen. et sp. nov	Valid	Solé, Falconnet & Yves	Early Eocene		France	A proviverrine hyaenodontid. The type species is Boritia duffaudi.	
Depaulacoutoia	Nom. nov	Junior homonym	Cifelli & Ortiz-Jaureguizar	Paleogene (Itaboraian)	Itaboraí Formation	Brazil	A didolodontid "condylarth"; a replacement name for Paulacoutoia Cifelli, 1983 (preoccupied). The replacement name itself is a junior homonym of Depaulacoutoia Kretzoi & Kretzoi (2000); Mones (2015) coined a new replacement name Ricardocifellia.	
Desmanodon larsi	Sp. nov	Valid	Furió, van Dam & Kaya	Late Miocene		Turkey	A member of Talpidae, a species of Desmanodon.	
Dormaalocyon	Gen. et comb. nov	Valid	Solé et al.	Earliest Eocene	Tienen Formation	Belgium	A member of Carnivoramorpha and Carnivoraformes; a new genus for "Miacis" latouri Quinet, 1966.	Life restoration of D. latouri
Eoproviverra	Gen. et comb. nov	Valid	Solé, Falconnet & Yves	Early Eocene		France	A proviverrine hyaenodontid; a new genus for "Proviverra" eisenmanni Godinot (1981).	
Erenlagus	Gen. et sp. nov	Valid	Fostowicz-Frelik & Li	Middle Eocene	Irdin Manha Formation	China	An early member of Lagomorpha. The type species is Erenlagus anielae.	
Furodon	Gen. et sp. nov	Valid	Solé et al.	Eocene (late Ypresian or middle Lutetian)		Algeria	A hyainailourine hyaenodontid. The type species is Furodon crocheti.	
Gualta	Gen. et sp. nov	Valid	Cerdeño & Vera	Late Oligocene (Deseadan)	Agua de la Piedra Formation	Argentina	A leontiniid notoungulate. The type species is Gualta cuyana.	Tibiae of G. cuyana
Leonhardtina godinoti	Sp. nov	Valid	Solé, Falconnet & Yves	Early Eocene		France	A proviverrine hyaenodontid, a species of Leonhardtina.	
Minimovellentodon	Gen. et sp. nov	Valid	Solé, Falconnet & Yves	Early Eocene		France	A proviverrine hyaenodontid. The type species is Minimovellentodon russelli.	
Obergfellia	Gen. et sp. nov	Valid	Cooper et al.	Middle Eocene		India; Pakistan	A member of Anthracobunidae (a group of placental mammals of uncertain phylogenetic placement; might be stem-perissodactyls or relatives of proboscideans and sirenians). The type species is Obergfellia occidentalis.	Mandible of O. occidentalis
Palaeosinopa reclusum	Sp. nov	Valid	Rankin	Late Paleocene	Ravenscrag Formation	Canada	A member of Pantolestidae, a species of Palaeosinopa.	
Paleoungulatum	Gen. et sp. nov	Valid	Kelly	Latest Cretaceous?	Hell Creek Formation	United States	A "condylarth", possibly a member of the family Periptychidae. The type species is Paleoungulatum hooleyi.	
Parvavorodon	Gen. et sp. nov	Valid	Solé et al.	Eocene (late Ypresian or middle Lutetian)		Algeria	A hyainailourine hyaenodontid. The type species is Parvavorodon gheerbranti.	
Promioclaenus walshi	Sp. nov	Valid	Lofgren et al.	Paleocene	Goler Formation	United States	A hyopsodontid, a species of Promioclaenus.	
Protoselene ashtoni	Sp. nov	Valid	Lofgren et al.	Paleocene	Goler Formation	United States	A hyopsodontid, a species of Protoselene.	
Quercygale smithi	Sp. nov	Valid	Solé	Early Eocene		France	A member of Carnivoramorpha and Carnivoraformes, a species of Quercygale.	
Quyania europaea	Sp. nov	Valid	Rzebik-Kowalska	Early Pliocene to early Pleistocene		Poland	A neurotrichine talpid, a species of Quyania.	
Silvacola	Gen. et sp. nov	Valid	Eberle, Rybczynski & Greenwood	Early Eocene	Driftwood Creek beds	Canada	An erinaceid. The type species is Silvacola acares.	
Sinopa jilinia	Sp. nov	Valid	Morlo et al.	Eocene	Huadian Formation	China	A hyaenodontid, a species of Sinopa.	
Skoczenia	Gen. et comb. nov	Valid	Rzebik-Kowalska	Early Pleistocene		Poland	A talpine talpid; a new genus for "Geotrypus" copernici Skoczeń (1980).	
Uintacyon hookeri	Sp. nov	Valid	Solé	Early Eocene		France	A member of Carnivoramorpha and Carnivoraformes, a species of Uintacyon.	
Zhalmouzia	Gen. et sp. nov	Valid	Averianov & Archibald in Averianov, Archibald & Dyke	Santonian or Campanian	Bostobe Formation	Kazakhstan	A zhelestid. The type species is Zhalmouzia bazhanovi.	
