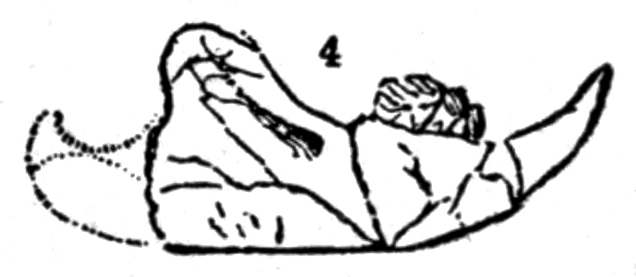
- Known part of the mandible

Scientific classification
- Kingdom: Animalia
- Phylum: Chordata
- Class: Mammalia
- Order: †Multituberculata
- Family: †Plagiaulacidae
- Genus: †Plagiaulax; Falconer 1857

Species
- P. becklesii

= Plagiaulax =

Plagiaulax Temporal range: Early Cretaceous

Extinct family of mammals

Plagiaulax is a genus of mammal from the Lower Cretaceous of Europe. It was a member of the also extinct order Multituberculata, and shared the world with dinosaurs. It is of the suborder "Plagiaulacida" and family Plagiaulacidae. The genus was named by Hugh Falconer in 1857, and was the first described multituberculate species.

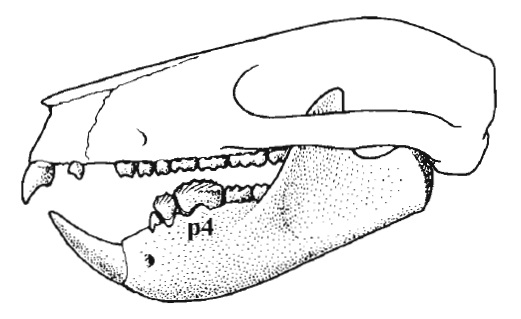
Skull and jaws of Plagiaulax, skull is a hypothetical reconstruction based on Bolodon and Ctenacodon

Fossil remains of the species Plagiaulax becklesii are known from the Lulworth Formation of Durlston Bay in Dorset, England. They include at least one partial lower jaw with teeth, though there may well be further specimens. Some material has been reported from Galve, Spain.

Another possible species, P. dawsoni, was provisionally named by Woodward in 1891. This came from the county of Sussex, which is further east along the English coast. It was subsequently damaged and there seems not to have been a scientific description. Its discoverer, Charles Dawson has been implicated in the Piltdown hoax and Pevensey tiles hoax.
