= Loxomeryx =

Loxomeryx Temporal range: Early Miocene, ~17.2 Ma

Scientific classification
- Kingdom: Animalia
- Phylum: Chordata
- Class: Mammalia
- Order: Artiodactyla
- Family: †Lagomerycidae
- Genus: †Loxomeryx; Fu et al., 2026

Type species
- †Stephanocemas guangheensis Deng et al., 2014

Genus of extinct mammal

Loxomeryx (lit. 'angled ruminant') is an extinct genus of deer-like ruminant mammal in the clade Lagomerycidae (or Lagomerycinae). It is known from partial mandibular and cranial remains, including cranial appendages ('antlers'), found in the Early Miocene (~17.2 million years ago) Dongxiang Formation of China. The genus contains a single species, Loxomeryx guangheensis, which was originally placed in the genus Stephanocemas in 2014, before being transferred to its own genus in 2026. The antlers have a distinctive palm-like morphology, supported by a slender pedicle (base) angled backward.

== Discovery and naming ==
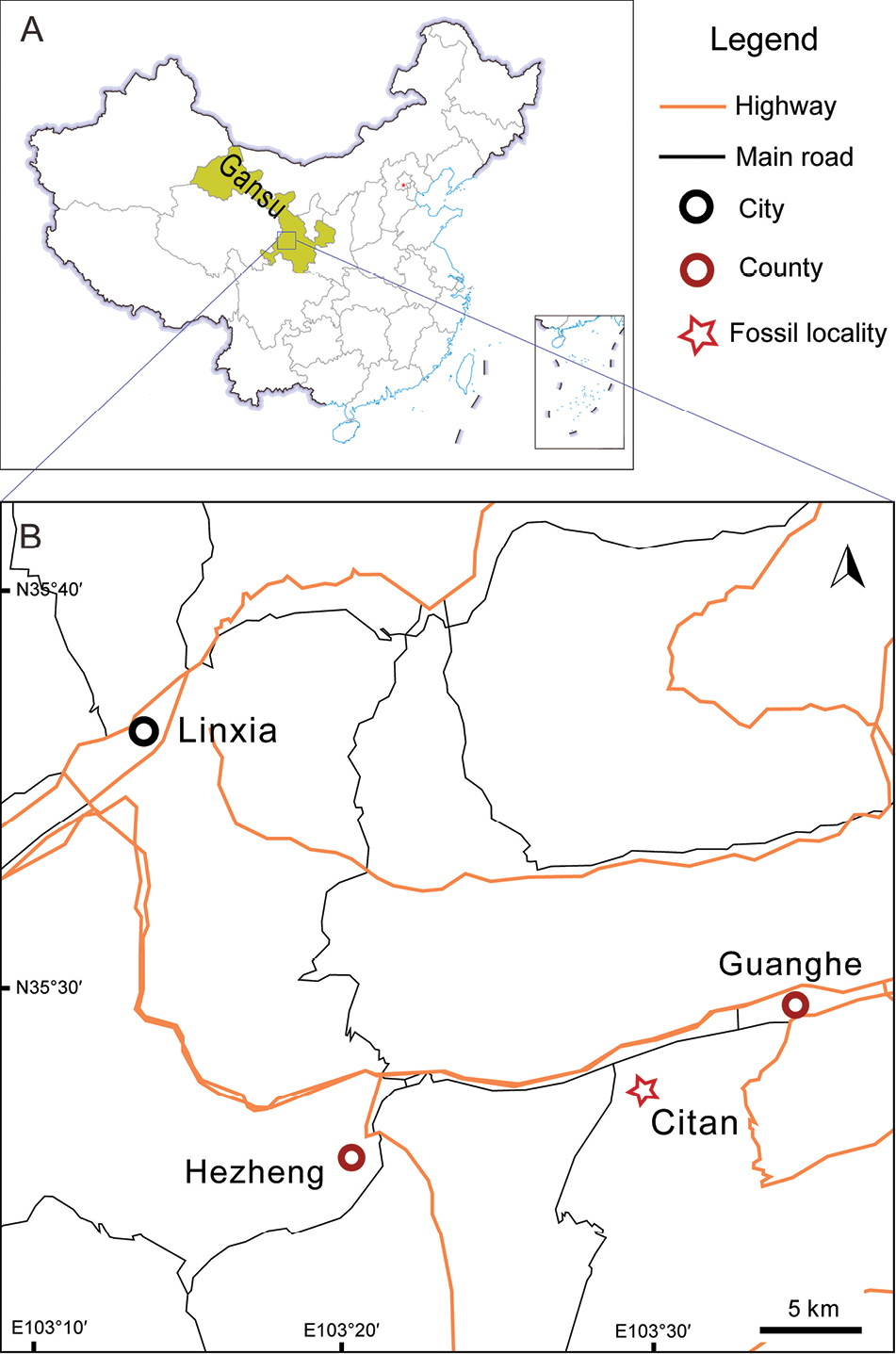
Discovery location (Citan) of the L. guangheensis remains described in 2026

In May 2011, Tao Deng and a team of researchers from the Chinese Institute of Vertebrate Paleontology and Paleoanthropology (IVPP), Northwest University's Department of Geology, and the University of Chinese Academy of Sciences, conducted fieldwork in the Dalanggou quarry in Maijiaxiang Township of Guanghe County, China. Several geologic formations of the Linxia Basin have outcrops at this locality and preserve mammal fossils, including (from oldest to youngest) the Shangzhuang, Dongxiang, Hujialiang, and Liushu formations. The research team collected fossil material of a crown-antlered deer-like animal from the Dongxiang Formation. The material they collected included a right antler, three cheek teeth, and two tarsal bones (an astragalus and calcaneum), all of which are permanently accessioned at the IVPP.

In 2014, Deng and colleagues described these remains as belonging to a new species of the genus Stephanocemas, a deer-like mammal in the clade Lagomerycidae which has a broad East, Central, and Southeast Asian distribution. They named it Stephanocemas guangheensis, with the specific name referencing the discovery of the fossils in Guanghe County. The researchers established the isolated antler (specimen IVPP V 18584) as the holotype (name-bearing) specimen. They further referred the remaining material (IVPP V 18585.1–5) to this species, while noting they appeared to belong to an individual much larger than that which produced the holotype.

In February 2026, Jiao Fu and colleagues described additional lagomerycid material recovered from the Citan locality of the Dongxiang Formation, which is about 3 kilometres (1.9 mi) away from Dalanggou and represents the same fossiliferous horizons. Previously, only bones of the proboscidean Platybelodon tongxinensis had been reported from this site. These discoveries included IVPP V 31500, a much more complete portion of the skull, including the dorsal part of the braincase and both complete antlers, and IVPP V 33252, the middle part of the right mandible with three preserved teeth (p4–m2). The researchers identified these new specimens as belonging to 'Stephanocemas' guangheensis based on the small size and nearly indistinguishable morphology of the antlers in both specimens. However, they also identified characteristics distinguishing this species from members of any other lagomerycid genus, including Stephanocemas. As such, they named the new genus Loxomeryx for 'S.' guangheensis, creating the new combination Loxomeryx guangheensis. The generic name combines the Greek words loxos, meaning 'angled' or 'oblique', and meryx, referring to ruminant mammals, referencing the bases of the taxon's antler's, which are inclined posteriorly.

Fu and colleagues (2026) noted that the teeth and tarsal bones described by Deng et al. (2014) and referred to 'S.' guangheensis should not be regarded as belonging to this species due to their significantly larger size. Furthermore, they mentioned that additional antlers consistent in size with the teeth and tarsals had been found in the Citan locality, distinct from Loxomeryx but reminiscent of Stephanocemas. As such, they likely belong to the latter genus rather than the former.

== Description ==
The multi-tined antlers of Loxomeryx likely belong to adult individuals, despite their small size. The antlers of juveniles and immature individuals have only two points: one facing externally and one facing medially. These increase in number through maturity.

== Classification ==
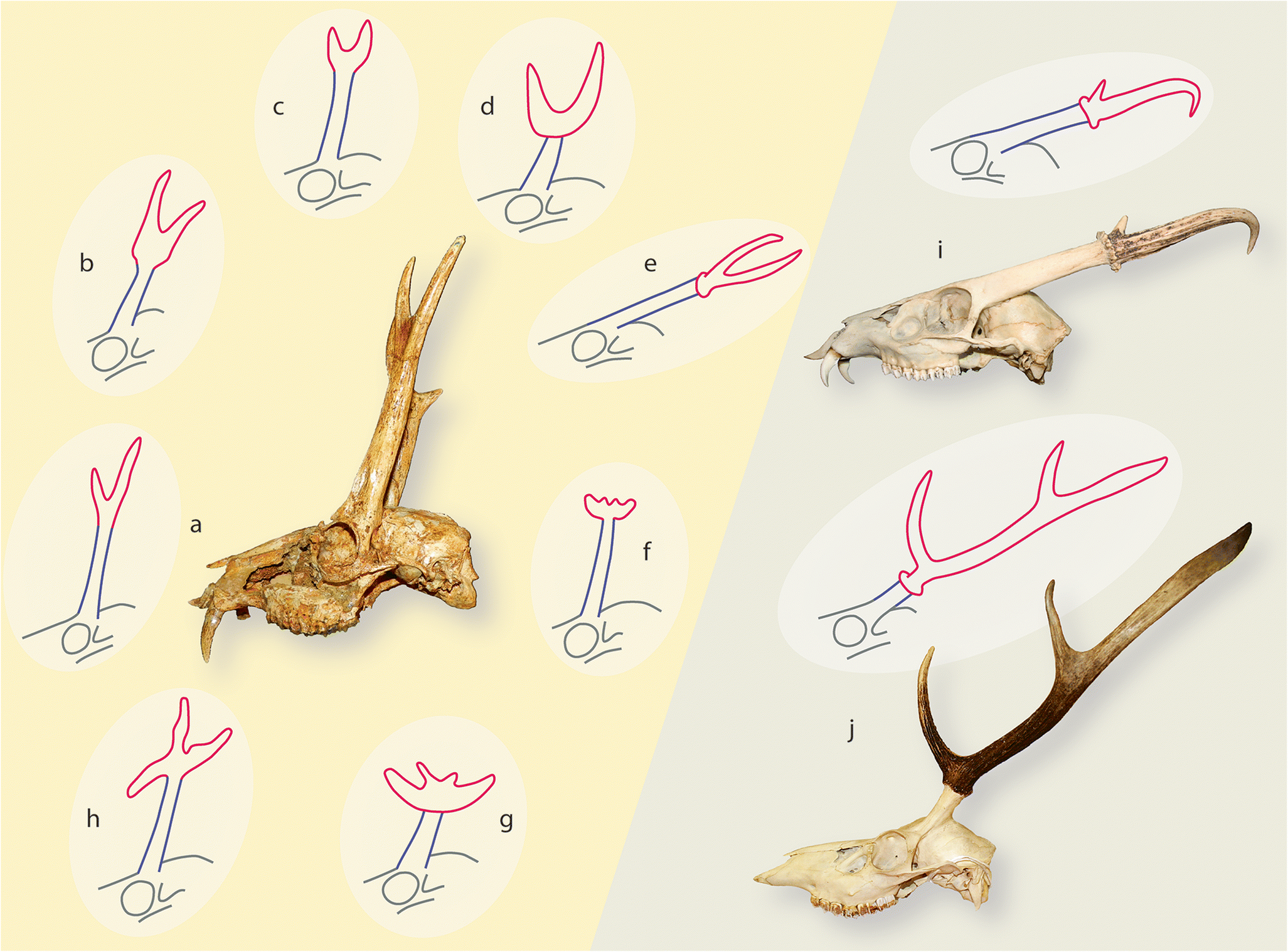
Skulls and antler morphology of various cervoids; note Lagomeryx (f) and the extant muntjac (i), a modern cervid with antlers on greatly elongate pedicles, similar to Loxomeryx and its extinct relatives

Loxomeryx is confidently identified as a member of a controversial deer-like mammal clade. If this clade is a true member of the deer group (Cervidae), it would be called Lagomerycinae (subfamily rank), while if it is placed outside of Cervidae, it would be called Lagomerycidae (family rank). These affinities have been extensively debated in the scientific literature, yielding no consensus. To test the relationships and affinities of Loxomeryx with other lagomerycids(/-ines), Fu et al. (2026) developed a phylogenetic matrix of 20 taxa and 64 anatomical characters (19 antler characters and 45 dental characters). Due to limited research on and poor understanding of these species, the resulting phylogenetic trees were poorly resolved. Several species previously assigned to the genus Lagomeryx were recovered outside of the clade containing its type species, L. ruetimeyeri, rendering the genus polyphyletic. Many of these may actually belong to distinct, novel genera, but additional research is needed to perform confident taxonomic revisions. In their strict consensus tree using maximum parsimony, Fu et al. recovered Loxomeryx in a polytomous clade comprising Stephanocemas, 'Lagomeryx' manai, and 'Lagomeryx' complicidens. These results are displayed in the cladogram below:

- - Procervulus praelucidus
  - - Euprox furcatus
    - Dicrocerinae
      - Acteocemas infans
      - - Dicrocerus elegans
        - Paradicrocerus
          - Paradicrocerus elegantulus
          - Paradicrocerus flerovi
    - Lagomerycidae(/-inae)
      - Lagomeryx
        - Lagomeryx sp. Xinjang
        - - Lagomeryx ruetimeyeri
          - Lagomeryx parvulus
      - - Heterocemas simpsoni
        - 'Lagomeryx' triacuminates
        - Ligeromeryx
          - Ligeromeryx colberti
          - Ligeromeryx praestans
      - 'Lagomeryx' tsaidamensis
      - - 'Lagomeryx' complicidens
        - 'Lagomeryx' manai
        - Loxomeryx guangheensis
        - Stephanocemas
          - Stephanocemas rucha
          - - Stephanocemas palmatus
            - Stephanocemas thomsoni
