= Goose flight =

Paleontological site and natural monument in Pavlodar, Kazakhstan

Coordinates: 52°17′45″N 76°55′22″E

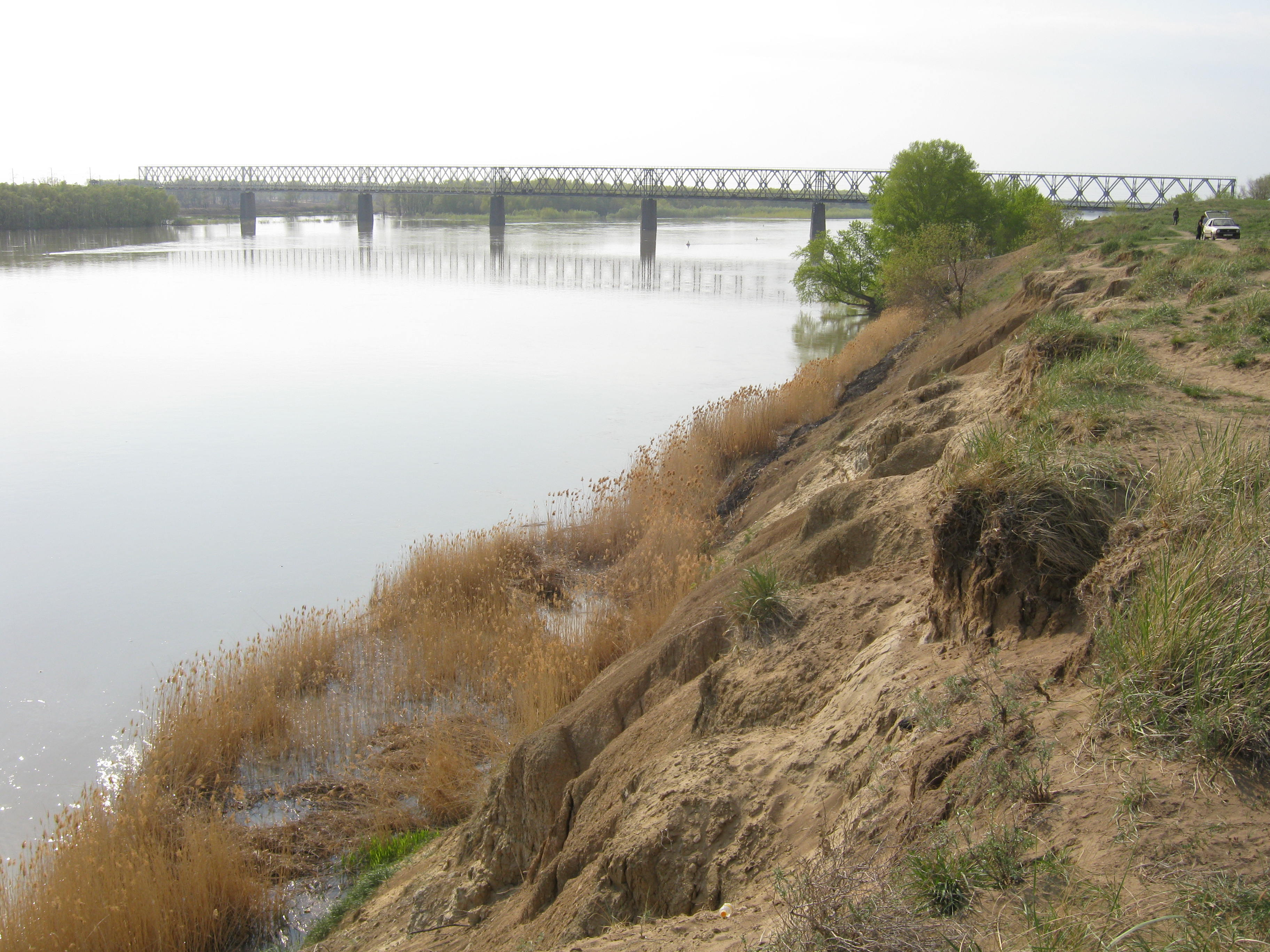
Location of Goose flight in 2011, before museumification

Goose flight or Goose migration (Kazakh: Қаздар қонысы; Russian: Гусиный перелёт) is a paleontological site and natural monument in Pavlodar, Kazakhstan, located on the eastern shore of the river Irtysh. It is one of Eurasia's largest burials of Hipparion fauna. Fossils of more than 60 species were found, including Chilotherium, Samotherium, Machairodus, and Lagomeryx.

It was discovered in 1928 by palaeontologist Yuri Alexandrovich Orlov. After coming to Pavlodar, Orlov took notice of the geological formations of the Neogene period. It was strewn with fragments of bones, jaws, and scattered mammal teeth. It was decided to do a trial excavation that later showed promising results; samples from it were sent via railway. Major digs have first been done in 1929 and 1930 by the Paleontological Institute, and later by the Kazakhstan Academy of Sciences.

The issue of its preservation was raised as early as 1956, and plans for its museumification have been proposed since then. It was put under state protection in 1971. An open-air museum was opened at its place in 2019, with the site itself being conserved.
