= Novaculadon =

Novaculadon Temporal range: Early Cretaceous, Berriasian

Scientific classification
- Kingdom: Animalia
- Phylum: Chordata
- Class: Mammalia
- Order: †Multituberculata
- Suborder: †Plagiaulacida
- Family: †Plagiaulacidae
- Genus: †Novaculadon; Weston et al., 2025
- Species: †N. mirabilis

Binomial name
- †Novaculadon mirabilis Weston et al., 2025

Extinct mammal genus

Novaculadon (meaning "razor tooth") is an extinct genus of plagiaulacid multituberculate mammal known from the Early Cretaceous (Berriasian age) Lulworth Formation of England. The genus contains a single species, Novaculadon mirabilis, known from a single left dentary (lower jaw bone) including the incisor, premolars 2-4, and two molar alveoli. The dentary is particularly robust in Novaculadon.

== Taxonomy ==
Novaculadon belongs to the family Plagiaulacidae, within the order Multituberculata.

=== Etymology ===
The genus name derives from the Latin novācula ("razor") and Greek odous (ὀδούς, "tooth"), referring to the sharp crest formed by the premolars. The species epithet mirabilis, meaning "miraculous," refers to the exceptional preservation of the specimen.

== Discovery ==
The holotype, NHMUK PV M 119716, is a nearly complete left dentary preserving the lower incisor and three premolars (p2–p4), with alveoli for two molars. It was found in 2023 in a fallen block from the "Flint Bed" of the Cherty Freshwater Beds, Warbarrow Tout Member, Lulworth Formation at Durlston Bay, Dorset, part of the Jurassic Coast World Heritage Site. The specimen was described and named in 2025 by Weston and colleagues.

Novaculadon mirabilis is the first multituberculate jaw recovered from the Purbeck Group since the 19th century and the most complete to date. Unlike most Purbeck mammals, which are known only from isolated teeth, it preserves key anatomical details that distinguish it as a new genus within Plagiaulacidae. Its discovery increases the known diversity of multituberculates from the Berriasian of Europe, bringing the Purbeck assemblage to ten species in four families.

== Description ==
The dentary of the holotype is robust and deep beneath the fourth premolar (p4), with a large mental foramen and short, slightly dorsally curved symphysis. The dental formula is 1.0.3.2, with no evidence of a first premolar. The lower incisor is large, robust, recurved, and fully covered in enamel, with a pointed apex and evidence of continuous growth. The second and third premolars (p2 and p3) are relatively small, bearing three and four cusps respectively. The fourth premolar is elongate and blade-like, bearing eight cusps arranged in a shearing series, and lacks basal denticulation. The ratio of p4 to p3 length (2.16) exceeds that of related genera such as Bolodon. The diastema between the incisor and p2 is short and forms a dorsally concave notch. Vacant alveoli indicate the presence of two molars, both double-rooted.

Distinctive features that differentiate Novaculadon from other plagiaulacids include the exceptional depth of the dentary below the fourth premolar, a shorter and more concave diastema, a boss-shaped mandibular condyle, and the unusual robustness and orientation of the lower incisor.

== See also ==
- Plagiaulacoid
