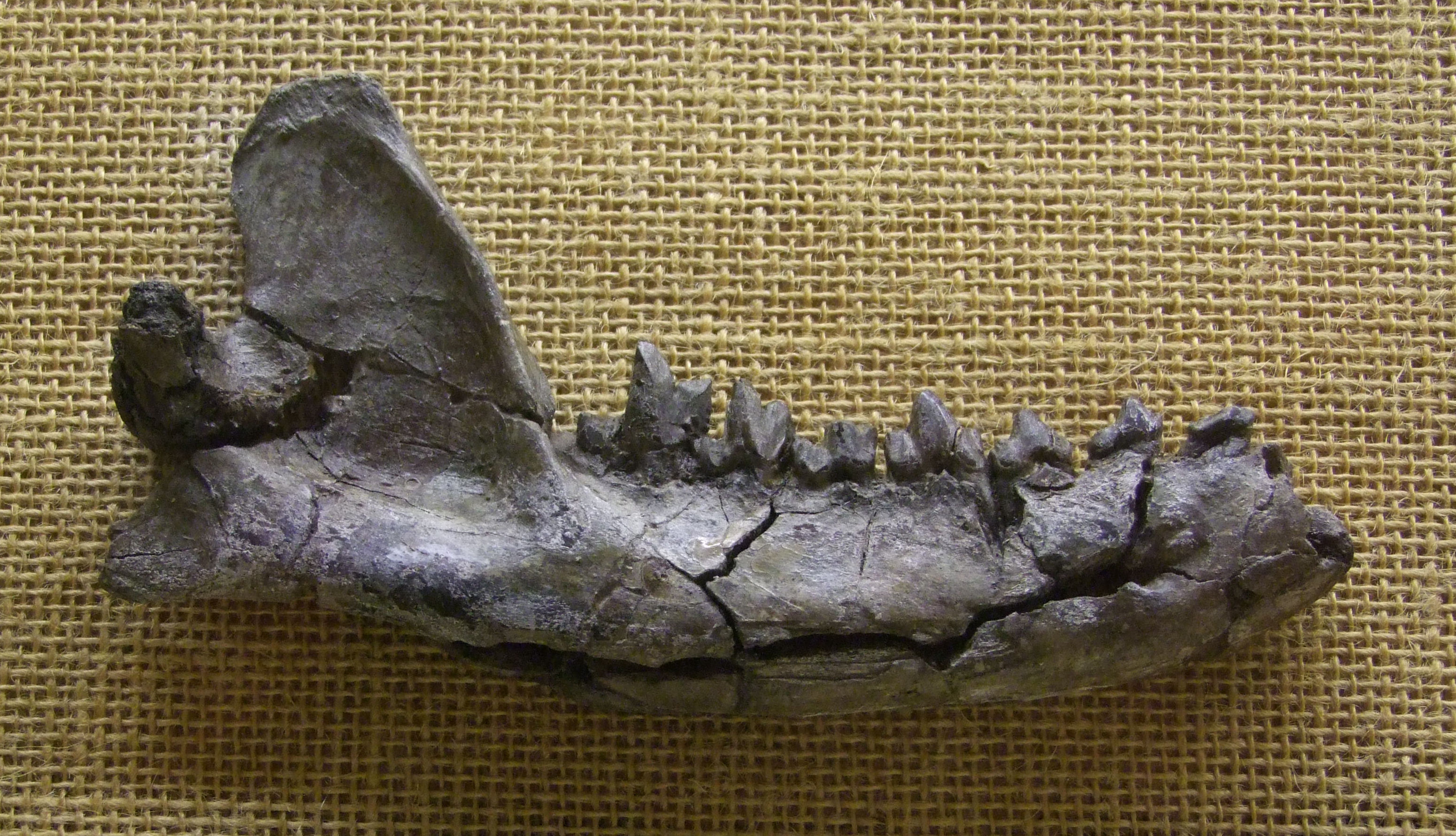
- lower jaw of Prodissopsalis eocaenicus

Scientific classification
- Kingdom: Animalia
- Phylum: Chordata
- Class: Mammalia
- Order: †Hyaenodonta
- Superfamily: †Hyaenodontoidea
- Family: †Hyaenodontidae
- Genus: †Prodissopsalis; Matthes, 1950

Type species
- †Prodissopsalis eocaenicus Matthes, 1952

Species
- †P. eocaenicus (Matthes, 1952); †P. jimenezi (Salesa, 2023)

Synonyms
- synonyms of genus: Imperatoria (Matthes, 1952); synonyms of species: P. eocaenicus: Geiselotherium robustum (Matthes, 1952); Imperatoria gallwitzi (Matthes, 1952); Imperatoria hageni (Matthes, 1952); Prodissopsalis ginsburgi (Calas, 1969); Prodissopsalis robustus (Springhorn, 1982)

= Prodissopsalis =

Prodissopsalis Temporal range: 46.3–37.8 Ma middle Eocene

Extinct genus of mammals

Prodissopsalis ("before Dissopsalis") is an extinct genus of placental mammals from extinct family Hyaenodontidae, that lived in Europe during the middle Eocene. P. eocaenicus fossils are known from France and the site of Geiseltal in Germany. P. jimenezi is known from Mazaterón in Spain.
