= Preregidens =

Preregidens Temporal range: 55.2–50.8 Ma early Eocene

Scientific classification
- Kingdom: Animalia
- Phylum: Chordata
- Class: Mammalia
- Order: †Hyaenodonta
- Superfamily: †Hyaenodontoidea
- Family: †Hyaenodontidae
- Genus: †Preregidens; Solé, 2015

Type species
- †Preregidens langebadrae Solé, 2015

Genus of extinct placental mammals

Preregidens ("frontal royal tooth") is an extinct genus of placental mammals from extinct family Hyaenodontidae, found in what is now France. It lived during the early Eocene epoch (Ypresian stage). It is a monotypic genus that contains the species P. langebadrae.
