= Surameryx =

Surameryx Temporal range: Mid-Late Miocene (Mayoan-Huayquerian) ~11.608–5.332 Ma

Scientific classification
- Kingdom: Animalia
- Phylum: Chordata
- Class: Mammalia
- Order: Artiodactyla
- Family: †Dromomerycidae
- Tribe: †Aletomerycini
- Genus: †Surameryx; Prothero et al., 2014

Type species
- †Surameryx acrensis Prothero et al., 2014

Extinct genus of mammals

Surameryx is an extinct genus of herbivorous artiodactyls originally described as belonging to the extinct family Palaeomerycidae. A single species, S. acrensis, was described from the Late Miocene (between the Mayoan and Huayquerian SALMA, between 11.6 and 5.3 million years ago) of the Madre de Dios Formation, South America. It was originally interpreted as one of the few northern mammals that entered South America before the Pliocene. However, both its identification as a member of the family Palaeomerycidae and claims about its Miocene age were subsequently challenged.

== Description ==
Surameryx is known from the left half of the nearly complete lower jaw, reminiscent of the North American palaeomerycids, which are known from numerous fossils.

The jaw of Surameryx is similar to that of Barbouromeryx in having a premolar row without reduction compared to the molar row; additionally it showed the characteristic "Palaeomeryx fold", a typical molar crest present in various types of primitive ruminants, and a vertical groove on the back or inner surface of the fourth premolar. Surameryx still differs from its relatives in the much wider shape of the molars and premolars, and in its shorter, upward recurved coronoid process; the stylids were also higher than in other related genera.

== Taxonomy ==
Surameryx acrensis was first named and described in 2014, based on the fossil jaw discovered in the Madre de Dios Formation extending along the Acre River in the area between Cobija, Bolivia and Assis Brasil. Surameryx is a representative of the palaeomerycids, an extinct family of Miocene artiodactyls related to cervids and giraffids. More specifically, Surameryx was a member of the dromomerycines, a group of palaeomerycids endemic to North America; within these, it seems to have a close relationship with Barbouromeryx trigonocorneus, a primitive dromomerycine of the middle Miocene (20–16 million years ago). The name Surameryx is derived from the Spanish word sur ("south") and the Greek meryx ("ruminant"); the species name acrensis refers to the Acre River.

== Relevance ==
If confirmed, the discovery of a dromomerycine in South America would be exceptional; until 2014 there were only sporadic findings of placental mammals other than xenarthrans or meridiungulates in South America in layers earlier than the Pliocene epoch. While the Great American Biotic Interchange is traditionally regarded as an event of the late Pliocene (about 3 million years ago), it actually started much earlier, going back at least to the late Miocene, about 10 million years ago. The presence of Surameryx in the Amazon basin is evidence of this exchange in the Miocene, which had already been suggested by the presence of contemporary specimens of gomphotheriids (Amahuacatherium), peccaries (Sylvochoerus and Waldochoerus) and tapirs and presence around the same time of ground sloths in North America (Thinobadistes and Pliometanastes). It seems that the paleomerycids were unable to successfully colonize South America, while other groups fared better there. Proboscideans survived until the arrival of humans) and peccaries and tapirs currently live in South America. However, the dating of the putative Miocene fossil beds in western Amazonia and the identification of the gomphothere remains as Amahuacatherium have been challenged.

Gasparini et al. (2021) reevaluated the fossil material of S. acrensis, and argued that dental characters used to assign this species to Dromomerycinae by Prothero et al. (2014) are not diagnostic, and can be also found in other groups of even-toed ungulates, including South American deers. The authors also noted that the teeth of the holotype specimen of S. acrensis are very worn and the heavy wear has played a part in confounding and obscuring some of the dental features. In addition, Gasparini et al. considered the provenance and age of known fossil material of S. acrensis to be dubious. The authors believed that the original interpretation of the holotype specimen of S. acrensis as a dromomerycine was heavily influenced by its supposed Miocene age. According to Gasparini et al., if the preserved morphology of the holotype specimen of S. acrensis is the only information considered, it is best interpreted as fossil material of a deer of uncertain specific identity, likely an old individual with a dental age greater than seven years. The authors considered it more likely that this specimen was of Quaternary rather than Miocene age.
