= Lakota Formation =

Geological formation in South Dakota, USA

- Stratigraphic range: Berriasian-Barremian
- Type: Geological formation
- Sub-units: Chilson Member. Fuson Member
- Underlies: Fall River Formation
- Overlies: Morrison Formation
- Thickness: 200 to 500 feet (60 to 150 m)

Lithology
- Primary: Sandstone
- Other: Shale, Coal, Conglomerate

Location
- Region: North America
- Country: United States

Type section
- Named for: Lakota Native American tribe
- Named by: Darton
- Year defined: 1899

The Lakota Formation is a sequence of rocks of early Cretaceous (Berriasian to Barremian) age from Western North America. Located in South Dakota, the name of the formation is derived from the Lakota Native American tribe.

There are two units of the Lakota Formation, the Chilson Member (upper Berriasian to Valanginian) and the underlying Fuson Member (upper Valanginian to early Barremian). A Berriasian-Valanginian age for the Chilson Member has been extrapolated by means of ostracods and charophytes.

The Fuson Member takes its name from rock exposures in Fuson Canyon, a valley on the eastern side of the Black Hills.

== Vertebrate paleofauna ==
=== Dinosaurs ===
Dinosaurs reported from the Lakota Formation
Genus	Species	Location	Stratigraphic position	Material	Notes	Images
Dakotadon	D. lakotaensis		Chilson Member	"Skull, mandible, [and] vertebrae."	An ankylopollexian iguanodont	
Hoplitosaurus	H. marshi		Chilson Member	"Partial postcranial skeleton [and] osteoderms."	An ankylosaur belonging to Polacanthidae	
Osmakasaurus	O. depressus		Chilson Member	Portions of both ilia, anterior part of the blade of one pubis, an incomplete sacrum, centrum of the last sacro-dorsal, 12 caudal vertebrae, 1 thoracic rib and many fragments	An ankylopollexian iguanodont	
Macronaria	Indeterminate		Chilson Member	Left humerus and right metacarpal I	A macronarian related to Camarasaurus	
Ornithopoda	Indeterminate			Left femur	Indeterminate ornithopod, previously described as Hypsilophodon wielandi	

=== Mammals ===
Mammals reported from the Lakota Formation
Genus	Species	Location	Stratigraphic position	Material	Notes	Images
Bolodon	B. hydei		Chilson Member	Right M2	A plagiaulacid multituberculate	
Infernolestes	I. rougieri		Chilson Member	Right lower M1	A spalacotheriid trechnotherian.	
Lakotalestes	L. luoi		Chilson Member	Right upper molar (M5?)	A dryolestid	
Passumys	P. angelli		Chilson Member	Right M1	A plagiaulacid multituberculate	

=== Turtles ===
Turtles reported from the Lakota Formation
Genus	Species	Location	Stratigraphic position	Material	Notes	Images
Lakotemys	L. australodakotensis		Chilson Member	Two shells and a partial skull	A baenid paracryptodire	

Other vertebrate remains found within the Lakota Formation include a fish scale from the gar Lepisosteus and a crocodile tooth
