= Fuson Canyon =

Valley in South Dakota, United States

Coordinates: 43°33′58″N 103°20′31″W

Fuson Canyon is a valley in Custer County, South Dakota, in the United States. It is located on the eastern side of the Black Hills.

Fuson Canyon has the name of John Fuson, an early settler. The Fuson geologic unit of the Lakota Formation is named after exposures of sandstone, shale, and clay in Fuson Canyon.

== See also ==
- List of rivers of South Dakota
