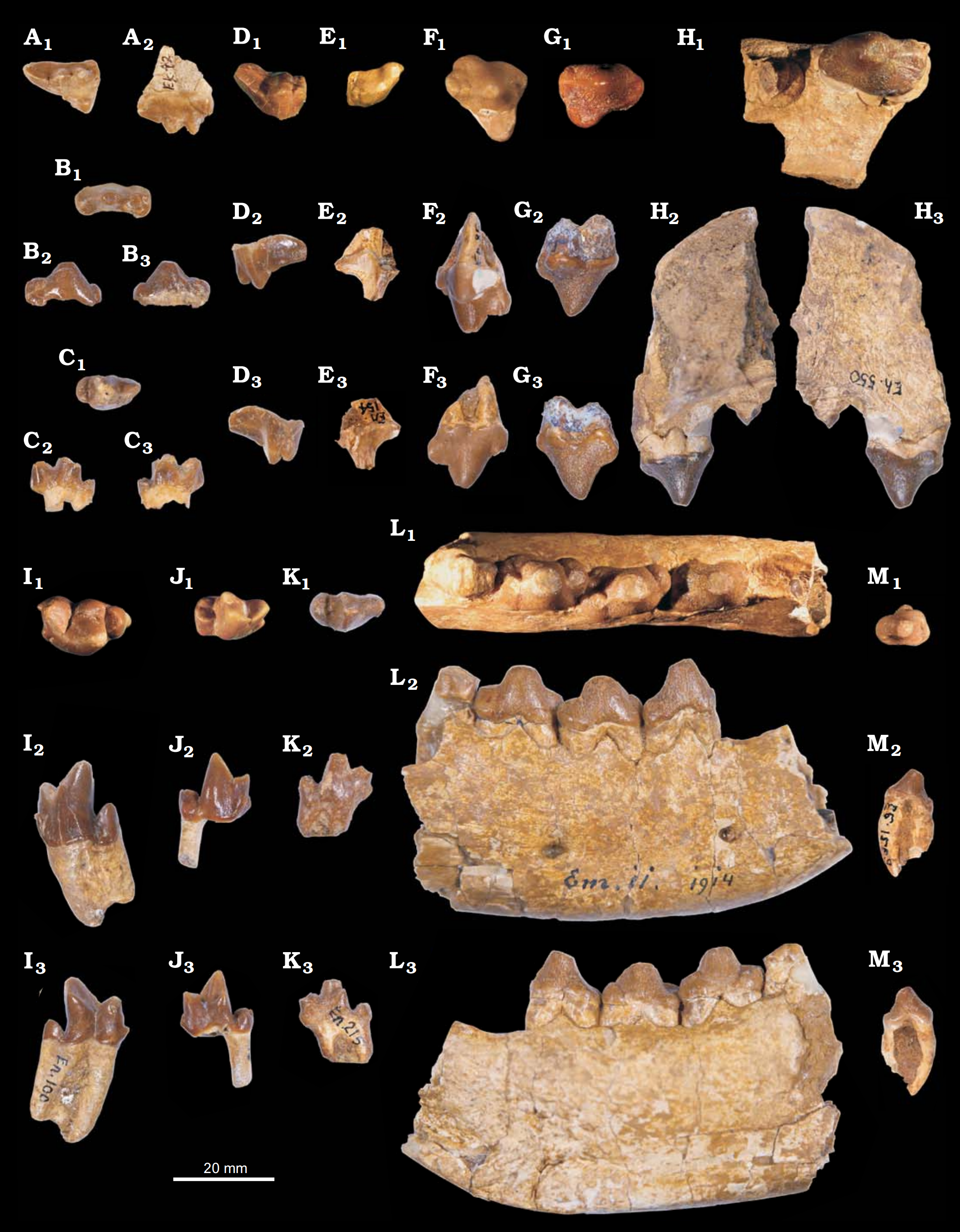
- fossil remains of C. egerkingensis

Scientific classification
- Kingdom: Animalia
- Phylum: Chordata
- Class: Mammalia
- Order: †Hyaenodonta
- Superfamily: †Hyaenodontoidea
- Family: †Hyaenodontidae
- Genus: †Cartierodon; Solé & Mennecart, 2019

Type species
- †Cartierodon egerkingensis Solé & Mennecart, 2019

= Cartierodon =

Cartierodon Temporal range: Middle Eocene (Lutetian), 44.9–43.5 Ma

Extinct genus of mammals

Cartierodon ("Cartier's tooth ") is an extinct genus of placental mammals from extinct family Hyaenodontidae, that existed in Europe (Switzerland and France) during the middle Eocene epoch (Lutetian stage). It is a monotypic genus that contains the single species C. egerkingensis.
