= Eospalax lingtaiensis =

Eospalax lingtaiensis Temporal range: Piacenzian–Gelasian

Scientific classification
- Kingdom: Animalia
- Phylum: Chordata
- Class: Mammalia
- Order: Rodentia
- Family: Spalacidae
- Genus: Eospalax
- Species: E. lingtaiensis

Binomial name
- Eospalax lingtaiensis Liu et al., 2014

Extinct species of rodent

Eospalax lingtaiensis is an extinct species of myospalacine rodent in the genus Eospalax that inhabited Asia during the Pliocene and Pleistocene epochs.

== Etymology ==
The specific epithet lingtaiensis references the county of Lingtai, where the type locality of this species is located.
