= Afrophoca =

Afrophoca Temporal range: Burdigalian–Langhian

Scientific classification
- Kingdom: Animalia
- Phylum: Chordata
- Class: Mammalia
- Order: Carnivora
- Parvorder: Pinnipedia
- Family: Phocidae
- Genus: †Afrophoca; Koretsky and Domning, 2014
- Species: †A. libyca

Binomial name
- †Afrophoca libyca Koretsky and Domning, 2014

Extinct genus of carnivores

Afrophoca was thought to be an extinct genus of earless seal from Miocene-age marine deposits in Libya. However, it has been demonstrated by Pickford & Muizon, 2024, that the type and only known specimen is from a medium-sized anthracothere, Afromeryx zelteni Pickford, 1991.
