= Eospalax simplicidens =

Eospalax simplicidens Temporal range: Late Pliocene–Early Pleistocene

Scientific classification
- Kingdom: Animalia
- Phylum: Chordata
- Class: Mammalia
- Order: Rodentia
- Family: Spalacidae
- Genus: Eospalax
- Species: E. simplicidens

Binomial name
- Eospalax simplicidens Liu et al., 2014

Extinct species of rodent

Eospalax simplicidens is an extinct species of myospalacine rodent in the genus Eospalax that lived in Asia during the Pliocene and Pleistocene epochs.

== Etymology ==
The specific epithet simplicidens derives from the Latin words simplic and dens, which together mean simple tooth.

== Description ==
E. simplicidens was a very small animal, with its body mass being estimated to have been about 300 g or less.
