= Pontophoca =

Pontophoca Temporal range: Miocene

Scientific classification
- Kingdom: Animalia
- Phylum: Chordata
- Class: Mammalia
- Order: Carnivora
- Parvorder: Pinnipedia
- Family: Phocidae
- Genus: †Pontophoca; Kretzoi, 1941

Species
- P. sarmatica (Alekseev, 1924) (type species); P. jutlandica Koretsky, Rahmat, and Peters, 2014 (type species)

Extinct genus of carnivores

Pontophoca is an extinct genus of earless seals from the middle-late Miocene of the eastern Paratethys basin and the North Sea.

== Fossils ==
There are two recognized species of Pontophoca, P. sarmatica and P. jutlandica. P. sarmatica is known from middle Miocene marine deposits in the eastern Paratethys basin, while fossils of P. jutlandica have been found in the Tortonian-age Gram Formation in Denmark.
