= Qaidamomys =

Qaidamomys Temporal range: Tortonian

Scientific classification
- Kingdom: Animalia
- Phylum: Chordata
- Class: Mammalia
- Infraclass: Placentalia
- Order: Rodentia
- Family: Muridae
- Subfamily: Murinae
- Genus: †Qaidamomys; Li and Wang, 2014
- Species: †Q. fortelii

Binomial name
- †Qaidamomys fortelii Li and Wang, 2014

Extinct genus of murine murid

Qaidamomys is an extinct monotypic genus of murine rodent that lived in East Asia during the Tortonian stage of the Late Miocene subepoch.

== Etymology ==
The generic name Qaidamomys references the Qaidam Basin, where the holotype fossil was found, with the suffix -mys being the Greek word for mouse. The specific epithet of the type species, Qaidamomys fortelii, honours Mikael Fortelius, a prominent palaeontologist studying Neogene Eurasian mammals.
