= Primoprismus =

Primoprismus Temporal range: Early Miocene

Scientific classification
- Kingdom: Animalia
- Phylum: Chordata
- Class: Mammalia
- Infraclass: Placentalia
- Order: Rodentia
- Family: Cricetidae
- Genus: †Primoprismus; Maridet et al., 2014
- Species: †P. fejfari

Binomial name
- †Primoprismus fejfari Maridet et al., 2014

Extinct genus of rodents

Primoprismus is an extinct genus of cricetid that lived during the Early Miocene.

== Distribution ==
Primoprismus fejfari is known from the Junggar Basin of Xinjiang, China.
