= Boritia =

Boritia Temporal range: 55.2–50.8 Ma early Eocene

Scientific classification
- Kingdom: Animalia
- Phylum: Chordata
- Class: Mammalia
- Infraclass: Placentalia
- Order: †Hyaenodonta
- Superfamily: †Hyaenodontoidea
- Family: †Hyaenodontidae
- Genus: †Boritia; Solé et al., 2014

Type species
- †Boritia duffaudi Solé et al., 2014

Genus of extinct placental mammals

Boritia ("animal from La Borie") is an extinct genus of placental mammals from extinct family Hyaenodontidae, that lived in France during the early Eocene epoch (Ypresian stage). It is a monotypic genus that contains the species B. duffaudi.
