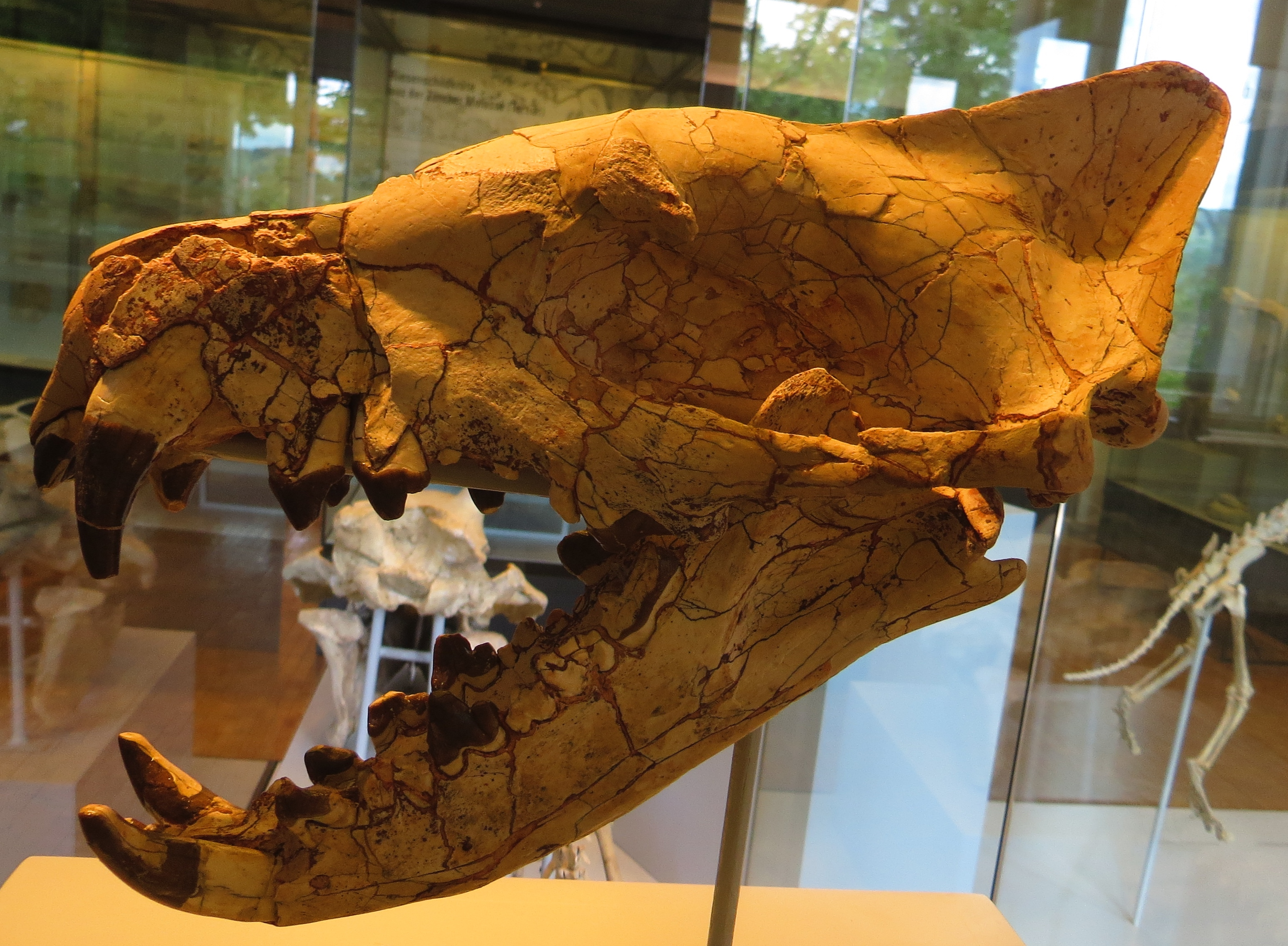
- Skull of Hyaenodon horridus
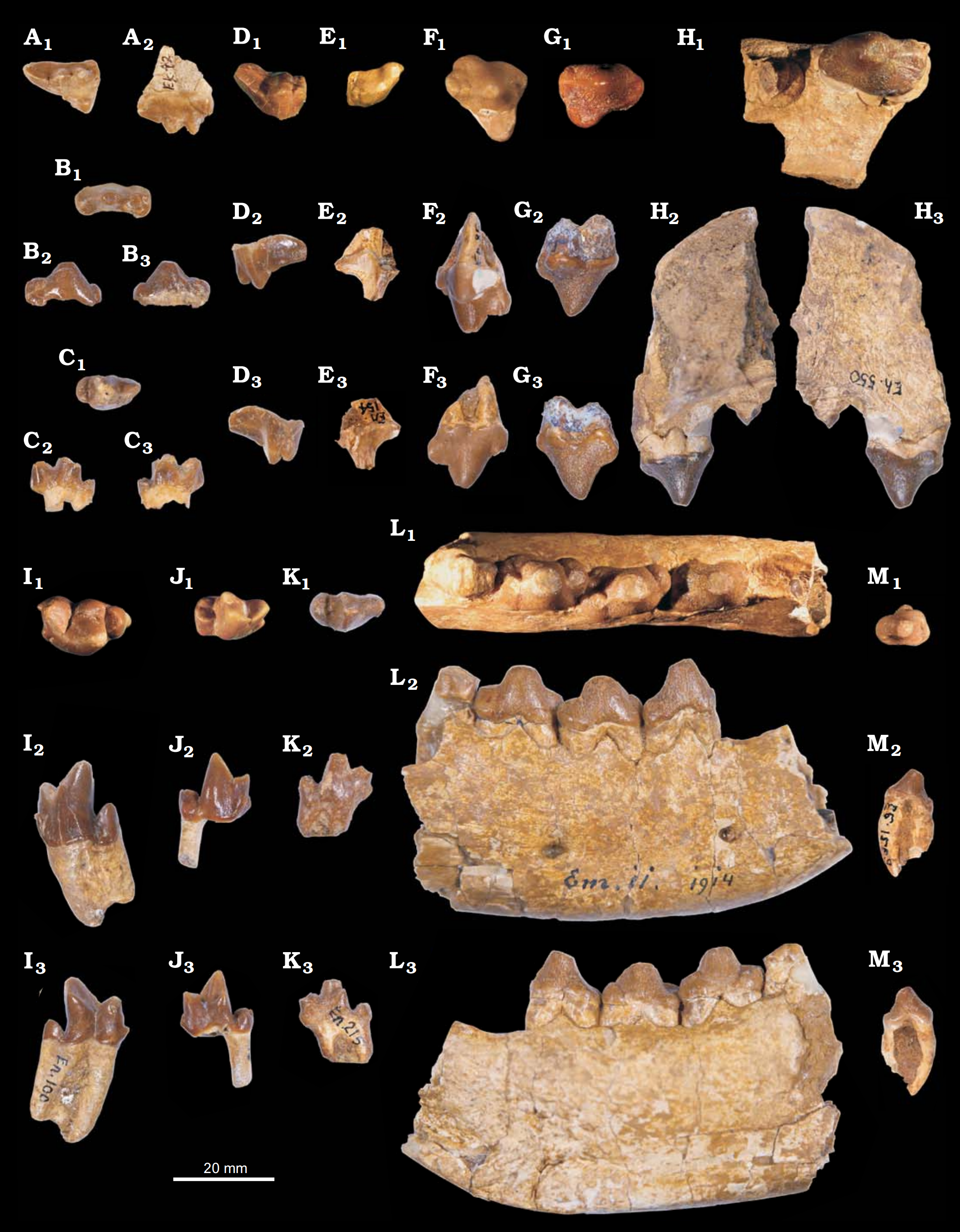
- Fossil of Cartierodon

Scientific classification
- Kingdom: Animalia
- Phylum: Chordata
- Class: Mammalia
- Order: †Hyaenodonta
- Superfamily: †Hyaenodontoidea; Leidy, 1869
- Family: †Hyaenodontidae; Leidy, 1869

Type genus
- †Hyaenodon Laizer & Parieu, 1838

Genera
- [see text]

Synonyms
- list of synonyms: Hyaenodontida (Haeckel, 1895); Hyaenodontoidea (Trouessart, 1885)

= Hyaenodontidae =

Hyaenodontidae Temporal range: Early Eocene to Late Miocene 56.0–11.5 Ma

Extinct family of mammals

Hyaenodontidae ("hyena teeth") is a family of placental mammals in the extinct superfamily Hyaenodontoidea within extinct order Hyaenodonta. Hyaenodontids arose during the early Eocene and persisted well into the late Miocene. Fossils of this group have been found in North America and Eurasia.

== Classification and phylogeny ==
=== Taxonomy ===
- Family: †Hyaenodontidae (Leidy, 1869)
    - Genus: †Boritia (Solé, 2014)
      - †Boritia duffaudi (Solé, 2014)
    - Genus: †Cartierodon (Solé & Mennecart, 2019)
      - †Cartierodon egerkingensis (Solé & Mennecart, 2019)
    - Genus: †Preregidens (Solé, 2015)
      - †Preregidens langebadrae (Solé, 2015)
    - Genus: †Protoproviverra (Lemoine, 1891)
      - †Protoproviverra palaeonictides (Lemoine, 1880)
    - (unranked): †Cynohyaenodon clade
      - Genus: †Cynohyaenodon (Filhol, 1873)
        - †Cynohyaenodon cayluxi (Filhol, 1873)
        - †Cynohyaenodon lautricensis (Lange-Badré, 1978)
        - †Cynohyaenodon ruetimeyeri (Van Valen, 1965)
        - †Cynohyaenodon smithae (Solé, 2021)
        - †Cynohyaenodon trux (Van Valen, 1965)
    - (unranked): †Eurotherium clade
      - Genus: †Consobrinus (Lange-Badré, 1979)
        - †Consobrinus quercy (Lange-Badré, 1979)
      - Genus: †Eurotherium (Polly & Lange-Badré, 1993)
        - †Eurotherium mapplethorpei (Solé, 2021)
        - †Eurotherium matthesi (Lange-Badré & Haubold, 1990)
        - †Eurotherium theriodis (Van Valen, 1965)
      - Genus: †Paenoxyaenoides (Lange-Badré, 1979)
        - †Paenoxyaenoides liguritor (Lange-Badré, 1979)
      - Genus: †Praecodens (Lange-Badré, 1981)
        - †Praecodens acutus (Lange-Badré, 1981)
      - Genus: †Prodissopsalis (Matthes, 1950)
        - †Prodissopsalis eocaenicus (Matthes, 1952)
        - †Prodissopsalis jimenezi (Salesa, 2023)
    - (unranked): †Leonhardtina clade
      - Genus: †Leonhardtina (Matthes, 1952)
        - †Leonhardtina godinoti (Solé, 2014)
        - †Leonhardtina gracilis (Matthes, 1952)
        - †Leonhardtina meridianum (Solé, 2020)
    - (unranked): †Matthodon clade
      - Genus: †Matthodon (Lange-Badré & Haubold, 1990)
        - †Matthodon menui (Rich, 1971)
        - †Matthodon peignei (Solé, 2020)
        - †Matthodon tritens (Lange-Badré & Haubold, 1990)
    - (unranked): †Oxyaenoides clade
      - Genus: †Oxyaenoides (Matthes, 1967)
        - †Oxyaenoides aumelasiensis (Solé, 2020)
        - †Oxyaenoides bicuspidens (Matthes, 1967)
        - †Oxyaenoides lindgreni (Rich, 1971)
        - †Oxyaenoides schlosseri (Rütimeyer, 1891)
    - (unranked): †Quercytherium clade
      - Genus: †Paracynohyaenodon (Martin, 1906)
        - †Paracynohyaenodon magnus (Crochet, 1988)
        - †Paracynohyaenodon schlosseri (Martin, 1906)
      - Genus: †Quercytherium (Filhol, 1880)
        - †Quercytherium simplicidens (Lange-Badré, 1975)
        - †Quercytherium tenebrosum (Filhol, 1880)
    - Subfamily: †Hyaenodontinae (Leidy, 1869)
      - Genus: †Propterodon ^{(paraphyletic genus)} (Martin, 1906)
        - †Propterodon morrisi (Matthew & Granger, 1924)
        - †Propterodon paganensis (de Bonis, 2018)
        - †Propterodon tongi (Liu & Huang, 2002)
        - †Propterodon witteri (Zack, 2019)
        - †Propterodon sp. [ZIN no. 34494] (Lavrov & Averianov, 1998)
        - †Propterodon sp. [Erlian Basin, Inner Mongolia, China] (Zhang, 2024)
      - Племе: †Hyaenodontini (Leidy, 1869)
        - Genus: †Hyaenodon (Laizer & Parieu, 1838)
          - †Hyaenodon brachyrhynchus (Blainville, 1841)
          - †Hyaenodon chunkhtensis (Dashzeveg, 1985)
          - †Hyaenodon dubius (Filhol, 1873)
          - †Hyaenodon eminus (Matthew & Granger, 1925)
          - †Hyaenodon exiguus (Gervais, 1873)
          - †Hyaenodon filholi (Schlosser, 1887)
          - †Hyaenodon gervaisi (Martin, 1906)
          - †Hyaenodon heberti (Filhol, 1876)
          - †Hyaenodon leptorhynchus (Laizer & Parieu, 1838)
          - †Hyaenodon lingbaoensis (Li, 2025)
          - †Hyaenodon minor (Lange-Badré, 1979)
          - †Hyaenodon pervagus (Matthew & Granger, 1924)
          - †Hyaenodon pumilus (Lavrov, 1999)
          - †Hyaenodon requieni (Gervais, 1846)
          - †Hyaenodon rossignoli (Lange-Badré, 1979)
          - †Hyaenodon weilini (Wang, 2005)
          - †Hyaenodon yuanchuensis (Young, 1937)
          - †Hyaenodon sp. [Ergiliyn Dzo Formation, Dornogovi Province, Mongolia] (Young, 1937)
          - Subgenus: †Neohyaenodon ^{(paraphyletic subgenus)} (Thorpe, 1922)
            - †Hyaenodon gigas (Dashzeveg, 1985)
            - †Hyaenodon horridus (Leidy, 1853)
            - †Hyaenodon incertus (Dashzeveg, 1985)
            - †Hyaenodon macrocephalus (Lavrov, 1999)
            - †Hyaenodon megaloides (Mellett, 1977)
            - †Hyaenodon milvinus (Lavrov, 1999)
            - †Hyaenodon mongoliensis (Dashzeveg, 1964)
            - †Hyaenodon montanus (Douglass, 1902)
            - †Hyaenodon vetus (Stock, 1933)
          - Subgenus: †Protohyaenodon ^{(paraphyletic subgenus)} (Stock, 1933)
            - †Hyaenodon brevirostrus (Macdonald, 1970)
            - †Hyaenodon crucians (Leidy, 1853)
            - †Hyaenodon microdon (Mellett, 1977)
            - †Hyaenodon mustelinus (Scott, 1894)
            - †Hyaenodon raineyi (Gustafson, 1986)
            - †Hyaenodon venturae (Mellett, 1977)
