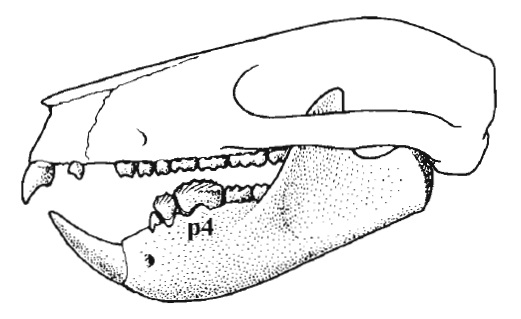
- Skull and jaws of Plagiaulax, skull is a hypothetical reconstruction based on Bolodon and Ctenacodon

Scientific classification
- Kingdom: Animalia
- Phylum: Chordata
- Class: Mammalia
- Order: †Multituberculata
- Suborder: †Plagiaulacida
- Family: †Plagiaulacidae; Gill, 1872

Genera
- Bolodon; Novaculadon; Plagiaulax

= Plagiaulacidae =

Plagiaulacidae Temporal range: Late Jurassic - Early Cretaceous

Extinct family of mammals

Plagiaulacidae is a family of fossil mammals within the order Multituberculata. Remains are known from the Upper Jurassic and earliest Cretaceous of North America and Europe. They were among the more derived representatives of the informal suborder of "Plagiaulacida".

The taxon Plagiaulacidae was named by Gill T.N. in 1872. It is also known as Bolodontidae, a name developed by Osborn H.F. in 1887.
