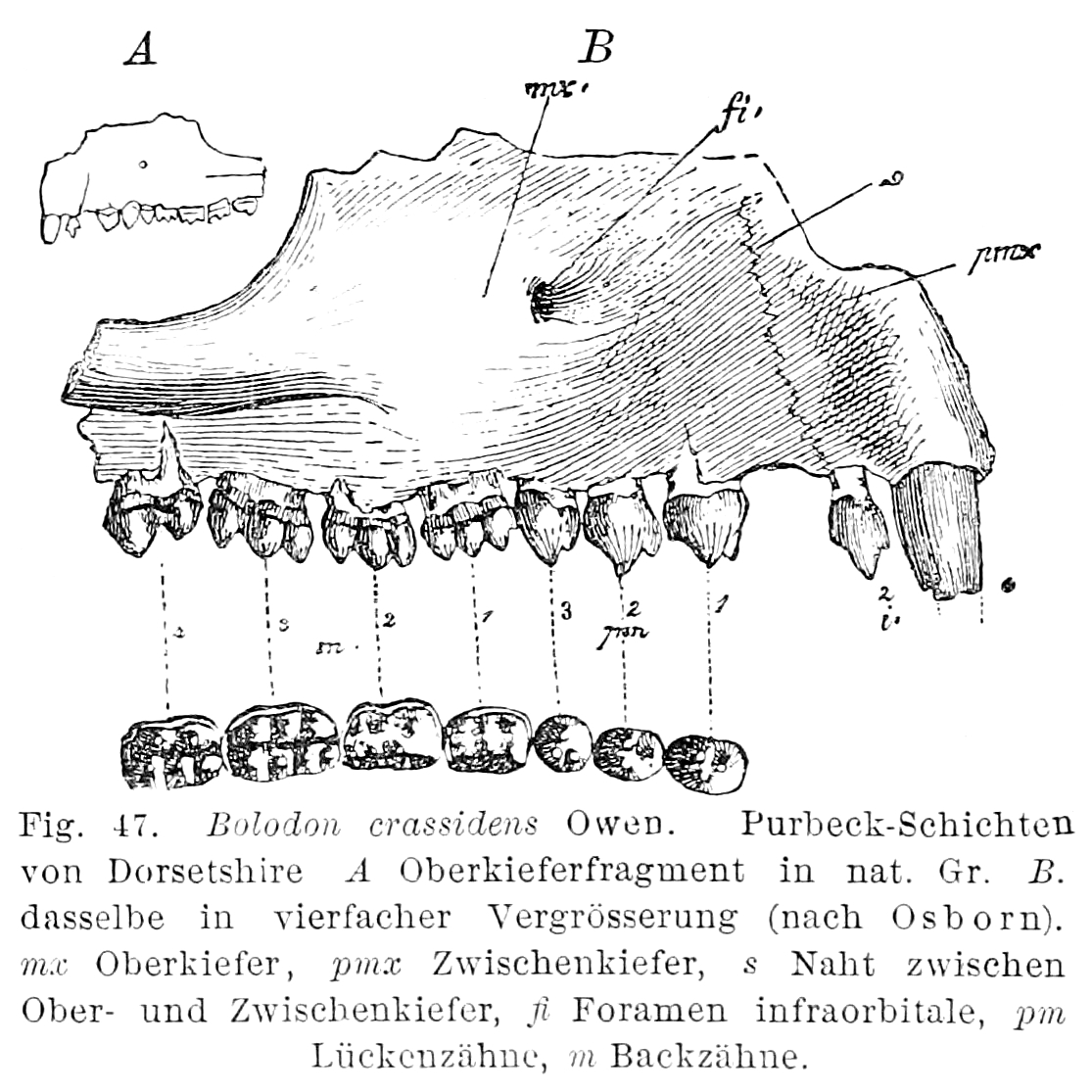
- Diagram of B. crassidens

Scientific classification
- Kingdom: Animalia
- Phylum: Chordata
- Class: Mammalia
- Order: †Multituberculata
- Family: †Plagiaulacidae
- Genus: †Bolodon; Owen, 1871

Species
- B. crassidens Owen, 1871 (type); B. osborni Simpson, 1928; B. minor (Falconer, 1857); "B." elongatus Simpson, 1928; B. hydei Cifelli, Davis, and Sames, 2014; B. falconeri (Owen, 1871)

= Bolodon =

Bolodon Temporal range: Berriasian

Extinct genus of mammals

Bolodon is a genus of extinct mammal from the Lower Cretaceous of Europe and North America. It was a member of the extinct order of Multituberculata and belongs to the suborder Plagiaulacida and family Plagiaulacidae.

== Type species ==
The type species, Bolodon crassidens, is known from fossils of the Lower Cretaceous of England from the Lulworth Formation in Durlston Bay, Dorset.

The species Bolodon elongatus is possibly not referable to this genus: "?new genus to be erected for Bolodon elongatus," (Kielan-Jaworowska & Hurum, 2001, p. 414).

Differs from “Bolodon” in having P1–P3 with prominent posterior cingulum and P1 of subequal size with P2 rather than distinctly smaller.

— Kielan-Jaworowska, Cifelli, & Luo (2004)., "Mammals from the age of dinosaurs : origins, evolution, and structure" p. 315

Fossils of the species Bolodon minor (type species of the Plioprion) have been found in the Lower Cretaceous of Durlston Bay, Dorset. Plioprion (Cope, 1884) is probably synonymous with Bolodon.

The species Bolodon osborni was named by Simpson G.G. in 1928. Fossils have been found in the Berriasian (Lower Cretaceous) of Durlston Bay, Dorset. Cifelli et al. (2014) erected B. hydei for remains from the Berriasian-Valanginian age Chilson Member of the Lakota Formation of South Dakota.
