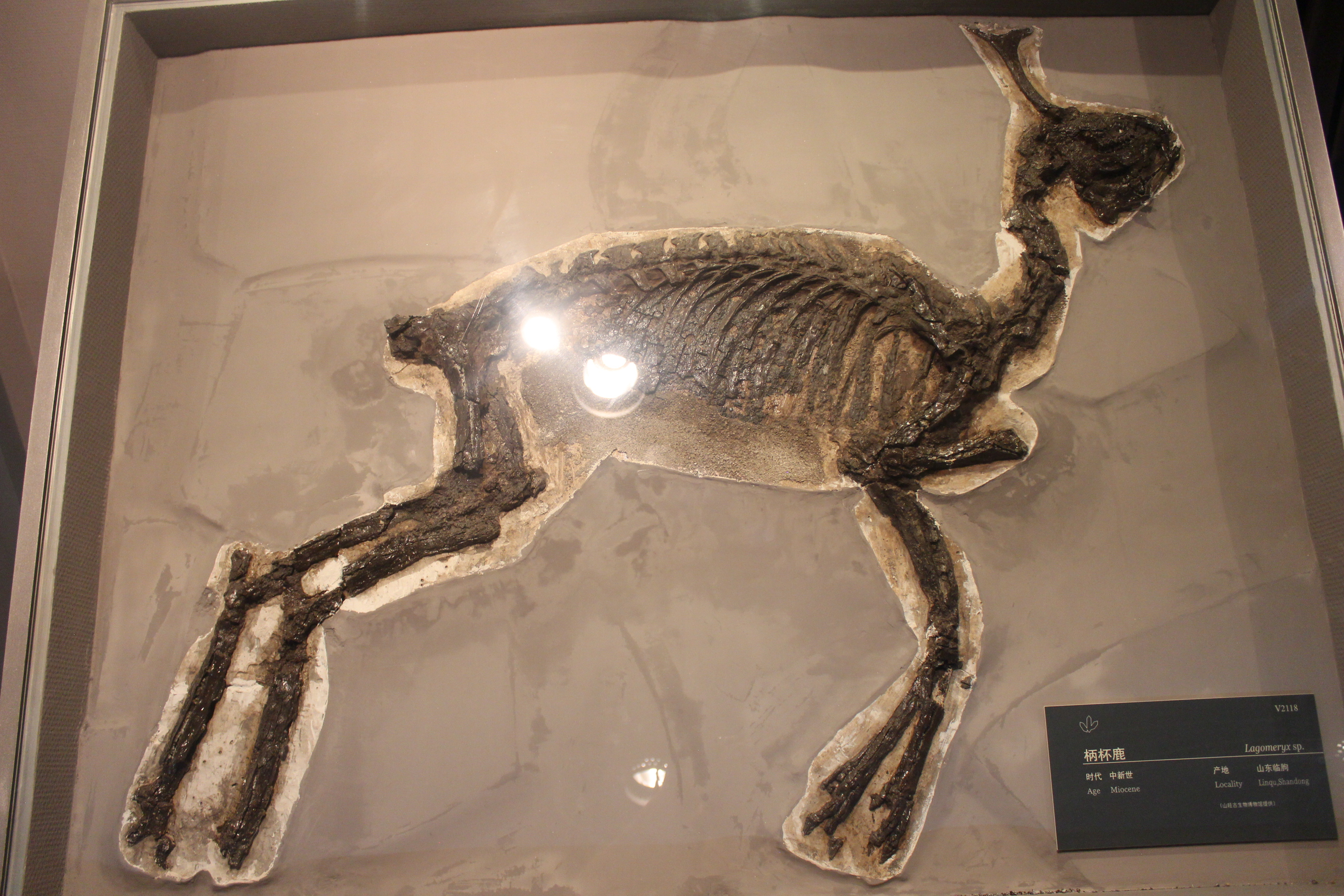
- Specimen of Lagomeryx on display at the Geological Museum of China.

Scientific classification
- Kingdom: Animalia
- Phylum: Chordata
- Class: Mammalia
- Order: Artiodactyla
- Family: †Palaeomerycidae
- Genus: †Lagomeryx; Roger, 1904

= Lagomeryx =

Lagomeryx Temporal range: Miocene

Extinct genus of mammals

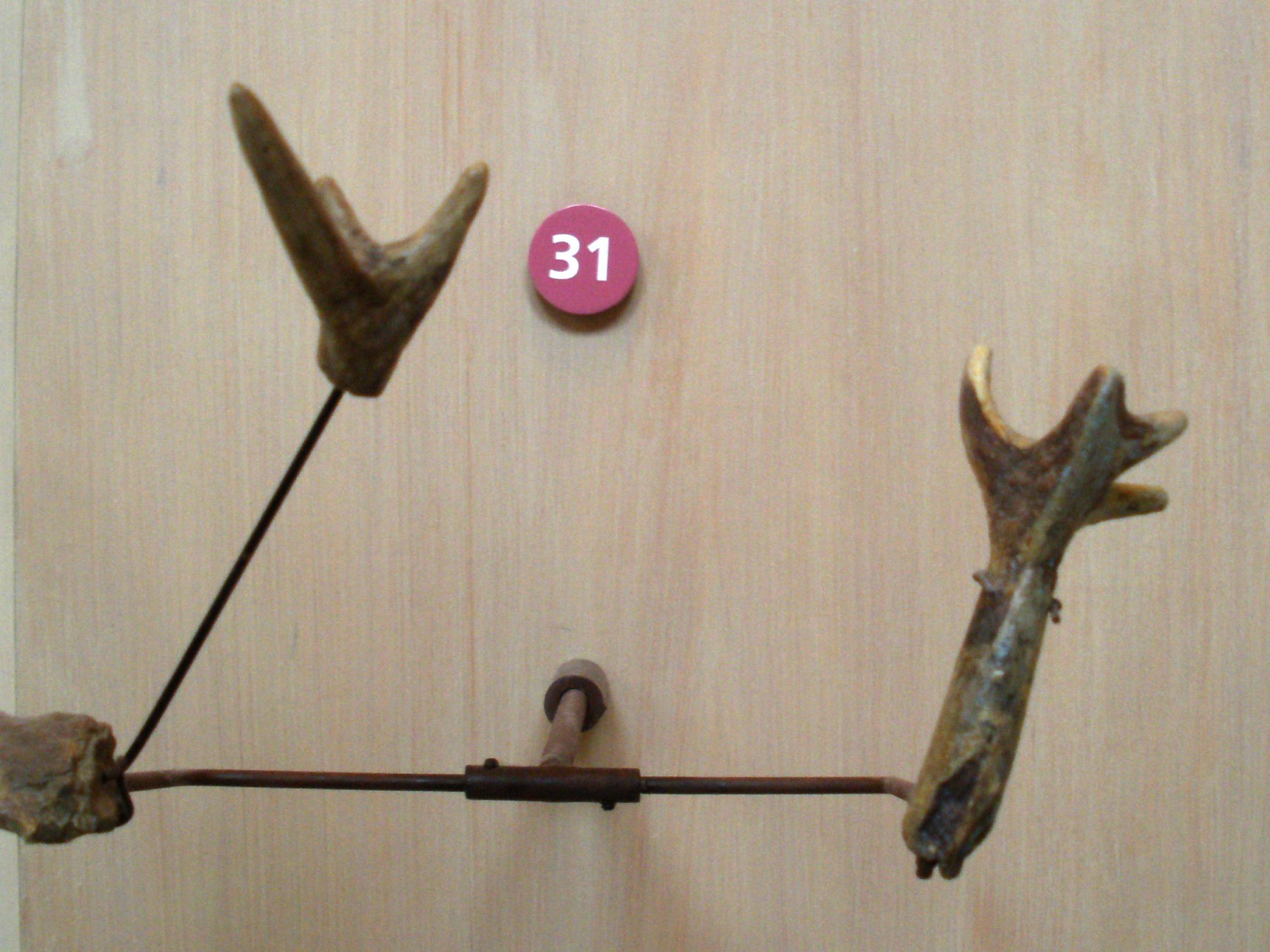
Lagomeryx

Lagomeryx is a genus of prehistoric ungulate that lived in Eurasia from the lower to middle Miocene. Fossil remains were found in Europe and Asia.

== Description ==
This animal looked not very different from present chevrotains, but possessed two small horns on the skull. Its size was very small (Lagomeryx means "rabbit ruminant" in reference to the size). The smallest species, Lagomeryx pumilio, was just as big as a hare. Lagomeryx and its close relatives (such as Ligeromeryx and Stephanocemas) had many primitive features resembling those of moschoid ancestors, such as the presence of two elongated canines in adult males. The cranial appendages were formed by a relatively short pedicle. In smaller species (such as L. pumilio) these horns were very tiny, and did not exceed the height of 1.5 centimeters.

== Species ==
- L. colberti
- L. complicidens
- L. manai Kantapon Suraprasit et al. 2014
- L. parvulus
- L. pumilio
- L. ruetimeyeri Thenius, 1948
- L. simpsoni
- L. teilhardi
- L. triacuminates
- L. tsaidamensis

The type species is L. ruetimeyeri, which could reach the size of a modern muntjac, and was found mainly in Germany and France. Other European species are the tiny L. pumilio, and L. parvulus, which was intermediate in size between the two previous ones. Asian species were L. complicidens and L. colberti from China, the latter more specialized and endowed with rather elongated horns. L. manai, found in Thailand, was large and probably related to L. complicidens

== See also ==
- Palaeomeryx
