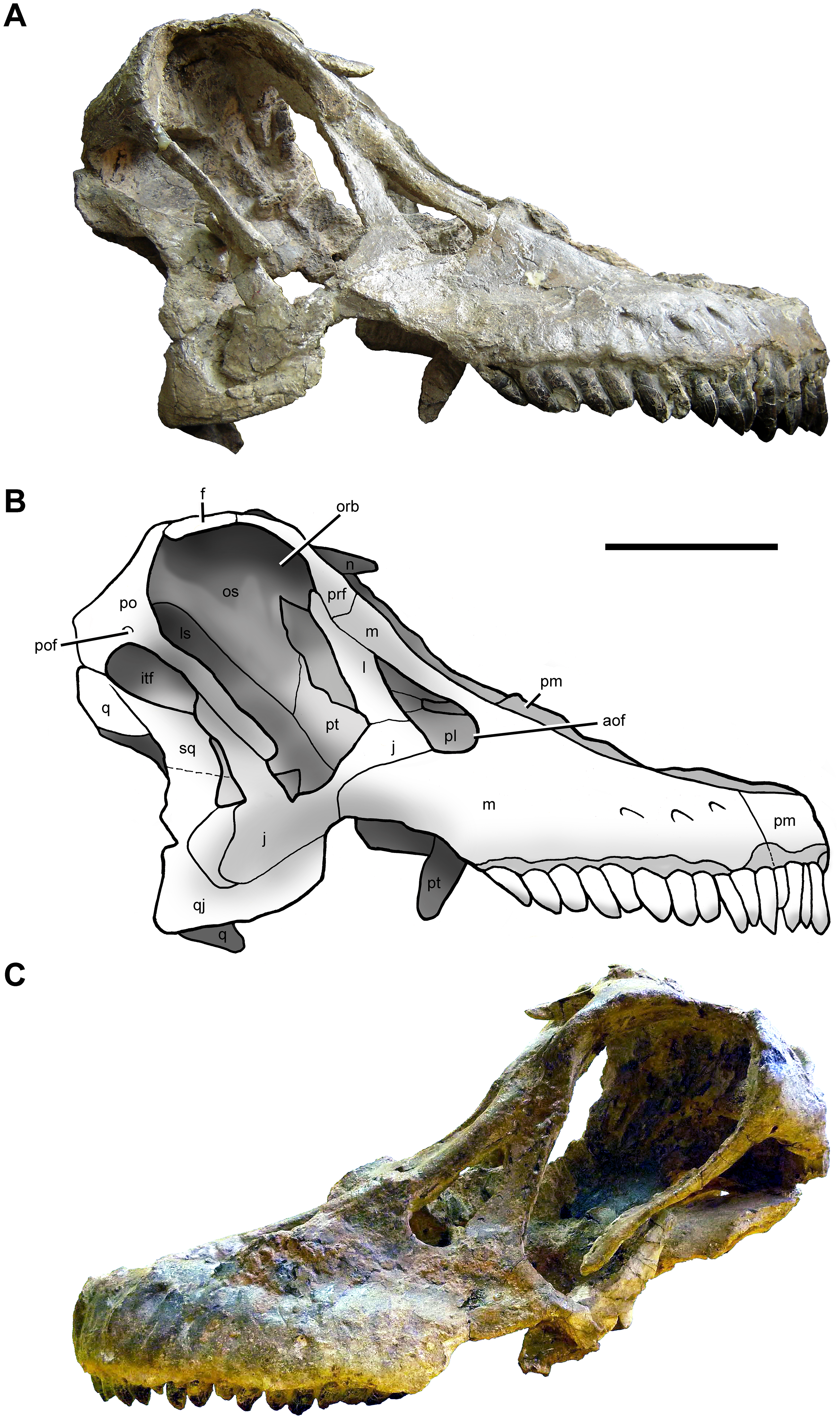
- Skull of Sarmientosaurus

Scientific classification
- Kingdom: Animalia
- Phylum: Chordata
- Class: Reptilia
- Clade: Dinosauria
- Clade: Saurischia
- Clade: †Sauropodomorpha
- Clade: †Sauropoda
- Clade: †Macronaria
- Clade: †Somphospondyli
- Clade: †Diamantinasauria; Poropat et al., 2021

Type species
- †Diamantinasaurus matildae Hocknull et al., 2009

Genera
- †Australotitan; †Diamantinasaurus; †Sarmientosaurus; †Savannasaurus; †Wintonotitan?

Synonyms
- Diamantinasauridae

= Diamantinasauria =

Diamantinasaurians Temporal range: Cenomanian–Turonian

Clade of somphospondylan sauropod dinosaurs

Diamantinasauria is an extinct clade of somphospondylan titanosauriform sauropod dinosaurs with close affinities to the Titanosauria, known from the early Late Cretaceous (Cenomanian-Turonian) of South America and Australia. It was named by Poropat and colleagues in 2021, and contains four (or five, depending on the placement of Wintonotitan) genera: Australotitan, Savannasaurus and Diamantinasaurus from the Winton Formation of Queensland, as well as Sarmientosaurus from the Bajo Barreal Formation of Patagonia. The existence of the clade indicates connectivity between Australia and South America via Antarctica during the Cretaceous period.

- Titanosauria
  - Andesaurus
  - - Huabeisaurus
    - - - Dongyangosaurus
        - Baotianmansaurus
      - - Diamantinasauria
          - Savannasaurus
          - Diamantinasaurus
          - Sarmientosaurus
          - AODF 836
        - - - Xianshanosaurus
            - Daxiatitan
          - Lithostrotia
            - Malawisaurus
            - - - Pitekunsaurus
                - - Epachthosaurus
                  - Colossosauria
              - - - Nemegtosaurus
                  - Tapuiasaurus
                - - Rapetosaurus
                  - - Isisaurus
                    - Saltasauridae

Though Diamantinasauria has been recovered consistently as a monophyletic clade, its placement within Titanosauria has fluctuated, meaning that while it appears to be relatively stable as a clade, its content and definition may change with further analysis and study.

In their 2024 description of the basal titanosaur Gandititan, Han et al. recovered the Diamantinasauria as the sister taxon to the Titanosauria, rather than within it. Later that year, Beeston et al. published a review of the sauropod fossil material found in the Winton Formation and described additional new material. They suggested that Australotitan may represent a junior synonym of the contemporary Diamantinasaurus, and recovered Wintonotitan within the Diamantinasauria for the first time. Their phylogenetic analyses also placed the Diamantinasauria as the sister taxon to the Titanosauria within the Somphospondyli. Their results are displayed in the cladogram below:

- Somphospondyli
  - Titanosauria
  - Diamantinasauria
    - Sarmientosaurus
    - - - Australotitan ("Cooper"; holotype, EMF102)
        - - AODF 0032 ("Mick"; possible distinct species)
          - AODF 0836 ("Alex"; referred to Diamantinasaurus)
          - Diamantinasaurus ("Matilda"; holotype, AODF 0603)
      - - AODF 2296 ("Leo"; possibly Wintonotitan)
        - - Wintonotitan ("Clancy"; holotype, QM F7292)
          - AODF 0665 ("Trixie"; Diamantinasauria incertae sedis)
          - AODF 0590 ("McKenzie"; Diamantinasauria incertae sedis)
          - AODF 0906 ("Ann"; referred to Diamantinasaurus)
          - Savannasaurus ("Wade"; holotype, AODF 0660)

== Palaeobiology ==
=== Palaeoecology ===
The dental microwear textures of diamantinasaurs, which contain more scratches than pits, provides evidence that they were mid-height feeders that foraged on vegetation about 1-10 metres above the ground.
