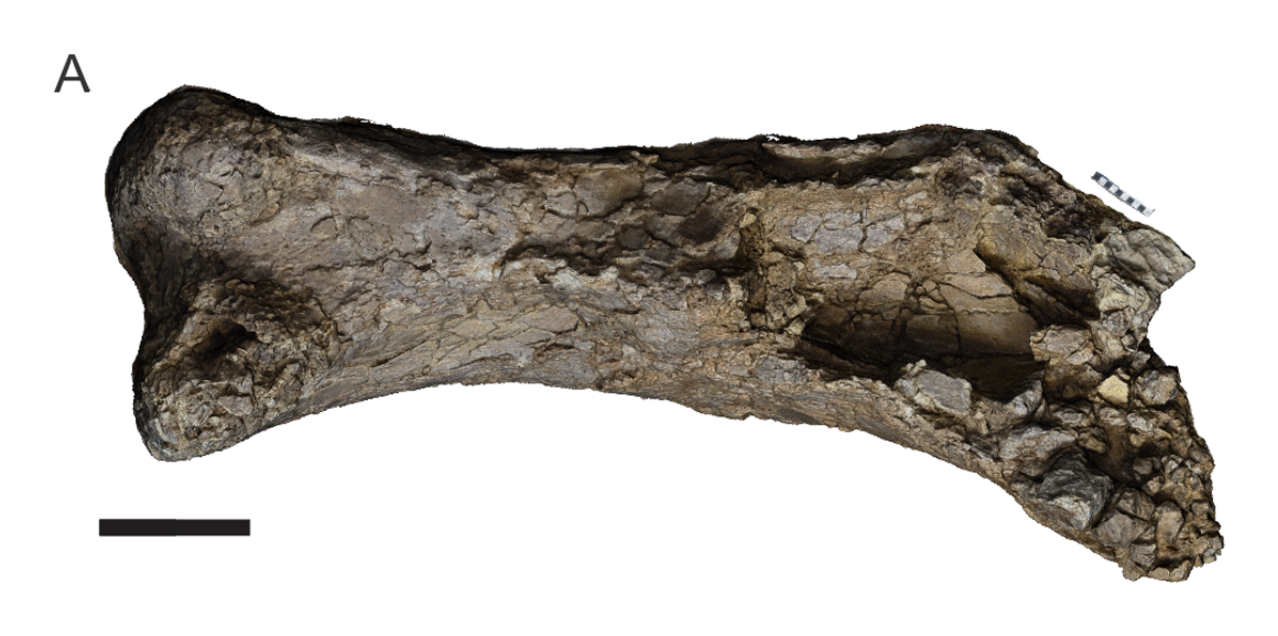
- Right femur of the holotype

Scientific classification
- Kingdom: Animalia
- Phylum: Chordata
- Class: Reptilia
- Clade: Dinosauria
- Clade: Saurischia
- Clade: †Sauropodomorpha
- Clade: †Sauropoda
- Clade: †Macronaria
- Clade: †Somphospondyli
- Clade: †Diamantinasauria
- Genus: †Australotitan; Hocknull et al. 2021
- Species: †A. cooperensis

Binomial name
- †Australotitan cooperensis Hocknull et al. 2021

= Australotitan =

Australotitan Temporal range: Late Cretaceous, Cenomanian–Turonian

Extinct genus of sauropod dinosaurs

Australotitan (/ɔːˈstreɪloʊˈtaɪtən/) is an extinct genus of possibly titanosaurian somphospondylan dinosaurs from the Late Cretaceous Winton Formation (Cenomanian–Turonian) of southern-central Queensland, Australia. The genus contains a single species, A. cooperensis, known from multiple partial skeletons. The genus Australotitan may be synonymous with Diamantinasaurus, a contemporary relative.

== Discovery and naming ==
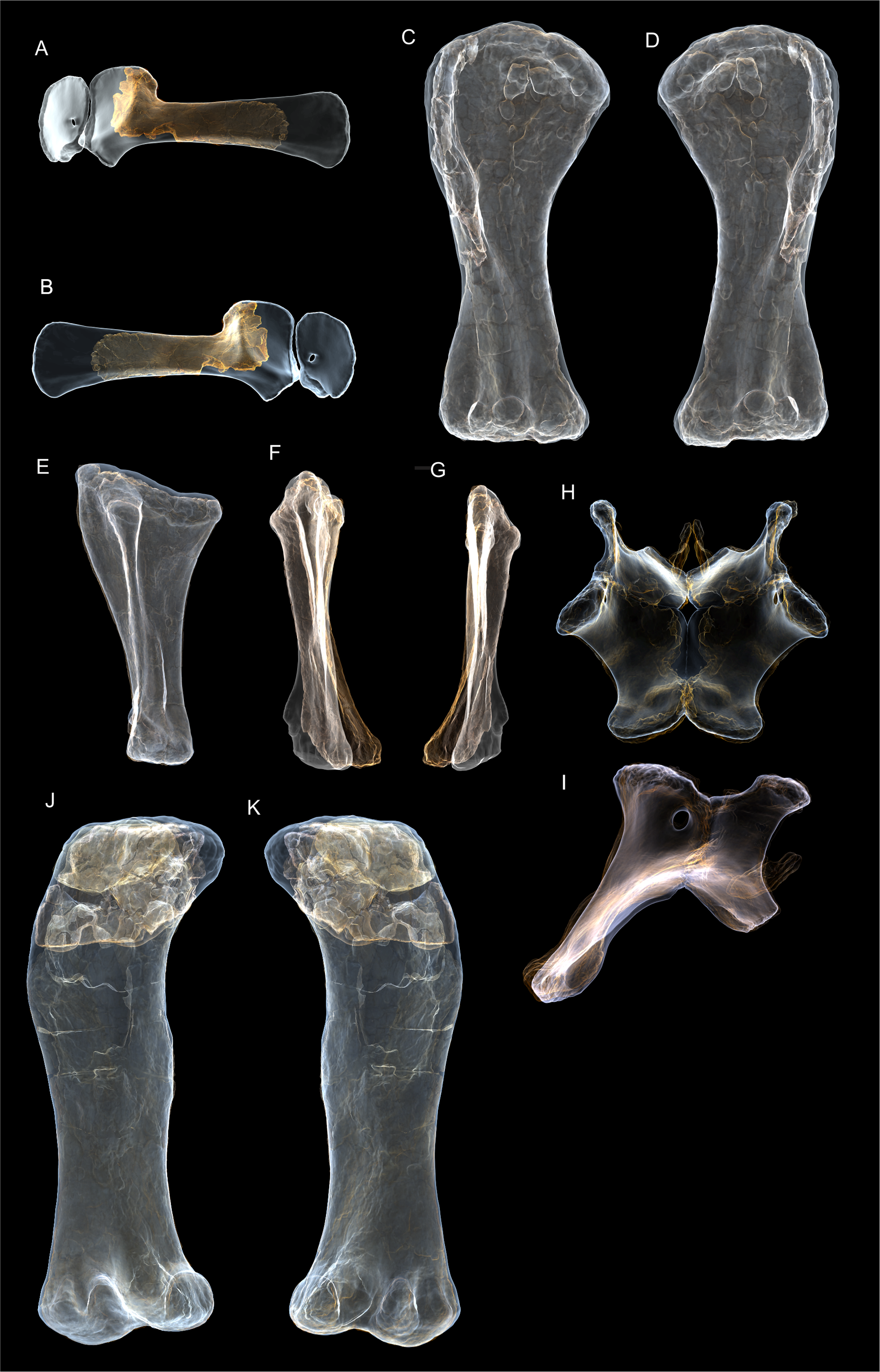
3D restorations of Australotitan holotype material

Australotitan was discovered in 2005 in layers of the Winton Formation in southwest Queensland, Australia, near the town of Eromanga. Sandy Mackenzie, the discoverer, had already collected other bones on the land of his parents in 2004. The fossil material was then prepared and excavated in conjunction with the Queensland Museum and the Eromanga Natural History Museum between November 2005 and April 2010. It was nicknamed "Cooper" after its discovery, being from the Cooper-Eromanga Basin, Cooper Creek system, "the Cooper Country".

The holotype specimen, EMF102 ("Cooper"), consists of a partial skeleton, including an incomplete left scapula, partial left and complete right humeri, right ulna, the right and left pubes and ischia, and partial right and left femora. An additional three specimens were referred to the genus: EMF164, nicknamed "George," (fragmented femur, ulna, presacral vertebrae, and rib material), EMF105 (a complete femur), and EMF165 (a distal humerus).

The type species, Australotitan cooperensis, was named and described by Scott A. Hocknull, Melville Wilkinson, Rochelle A. Lawrence, Vladislav Konstantinov, Stuart Mackenzie and Robyn Mackenzie in 2021. The generic name, Australotitan, combines the Latin word "australis", meaning "southern"—as it was found in Australia (which is sometimes referred to as "The Great Southern Land")—with the Greek word "Tιτάν" meaning "titan", in reference to the Greek mythological Titans and the dinosaur's gigantic size. The specific name, cooperensis, refers to the Cooper Creek system near the initial location of the holotype, and the nickname given to the holotype when it was discovered.

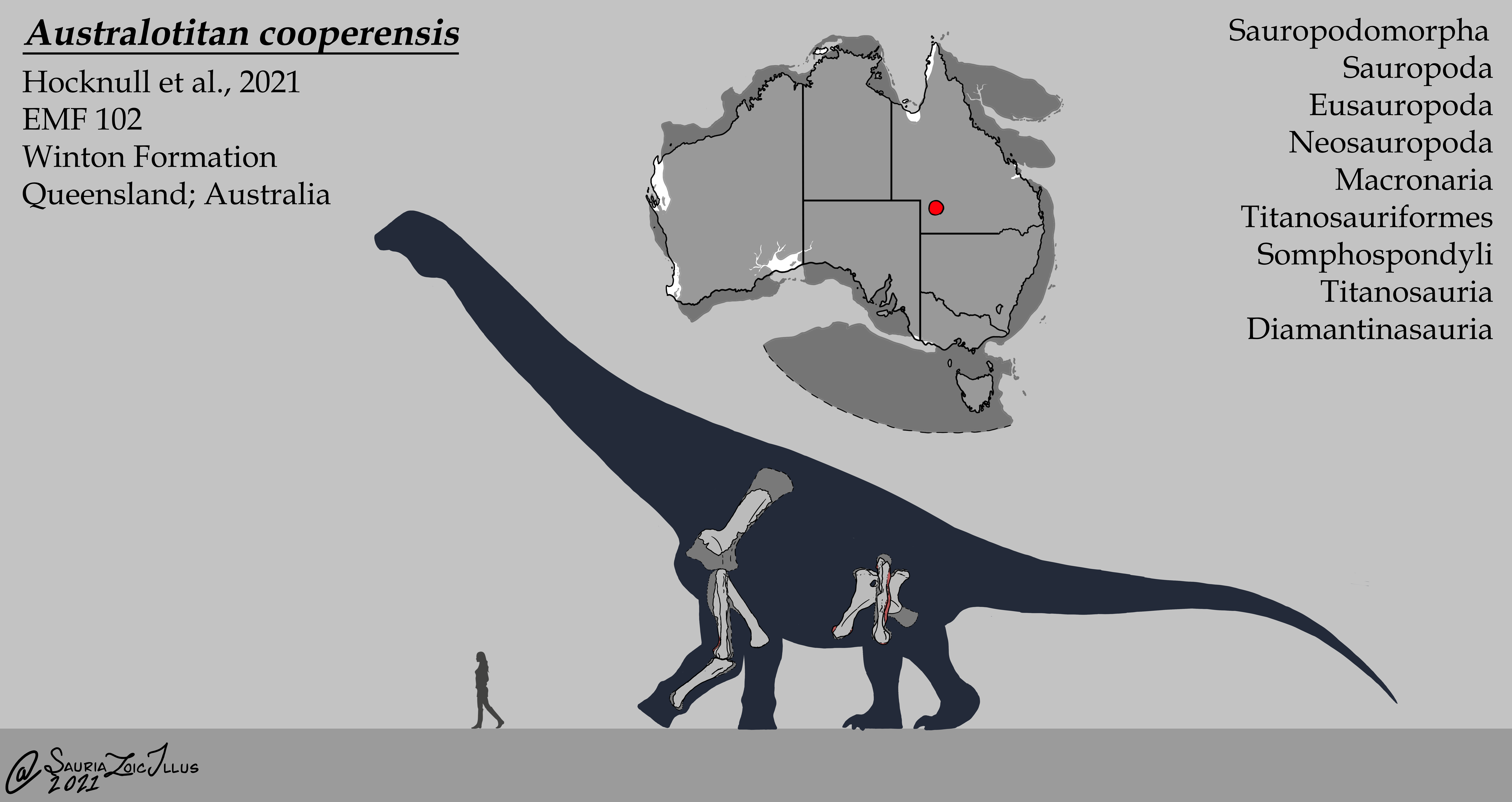
Skeletal and size diagram of the holotype specimen. Known material is shown in white, reconstructed material in gray, and deformities in red.

Several of the fossils housed and studied by the Eromanga Natural History Museum were trampled and compressed during deposition. This was the result of multiple smaller sauropods walking in a single line. The trackway has a total length of approximately 100 metres (330 ft).

== Description ==
Australotitan represents the largest known Australian dinosaur. The femur of specimen EMF164 has a length of 2.146 metres (7.04 ft), similar in size to the femora of Futalognkosaurus and Dreadnoughtus, though smaller than those of Patagotitan. The describing authors deliberately abstained from providing a size estimate, as it is notoriously difficult to obtain reliable results for sauropods. The discovery of Australotitan indicates that the gigantic titanosaurian sauropods were present during the mid-Cretaceous of eastern Gondwana.

== Classification ==
In a phylogenetic analysis performed by Hocknull et al. (2021), Australotitan was recovered as a titanosaur. In eleven out of fourteen analyses, it was placed in a clade with the contemporaneous titanosaur Diamantinasaurus, which, depending on the dataset, also included other Winton Formation sauropods Wintonotitan and Savannasaurus, and sometimes also Sarmientosaurus, Baotianmansaurus, Dongyangosaurus, Erketu, and Pitekunsaurus. This places it in the clade Diamantinasauria sensu Poropat et al. (2021).

In 2024, Beeston et al. reviewed the sauropod fossil material found in the Winton Formation and described additional new material. Based on their analyses, they found that Australotitan shares several similarities with the contemporary Diamantinasaurus that were not recognized in its original 2021 description. Beeston et al. failed to find sufficient autapomorphies, or distinct features, to distinguish it from Diamantinasaurus, and, as such, proposed that it can likely be considered as a junior synonym of the latter. However, since the Australotitan only shares one autapomorphy with Diamantinasaurus, and three synapomorphies (shared traits) of the Diamantinasauria, they regarded it as an indeterminate member of this clade.

Beeston et al. (2024) reviewed the relationships of diamantinasaur specimens in a phylogenetic analysis, and recovered the clade as the sister taxon to the Titanosauria within the Somphospondyli. The Australotitan holotype was found to be most closely related to Diamantinasaurus. Their results are displayed in the cladogram below:

- Somphospondyli
  - Titanosauria
  - Diamantinasauria
    - Sarmientosaurus
    - - - Australotitan ("Cooper"; holotype, EMF102)
        - - AODF 0032 ("Mick"; possible distinct species)
          - AODF 0836 ("Alex"; referred to Diamantinasaurus)
          - Diamantinasaurus ("Matilda"; holotype, AODF 0603)
      - - AODF 2296 ("Leo"; possibly Wintonotitan)
        - - Wintonotitan ("Clancy"; holotype, QM F7292)
          - AODF 0665 ("Trixie"; Diamantinasauria incertae sedis)
          - AODF 0590 ("McKenzie"; Diamantinasauria incertae sedis)
          - AODF 0906 ("Ann"; referred to Diamantinasaurus)
          - Savannasaurus ("Wade"; holotype, AODF 0660)
