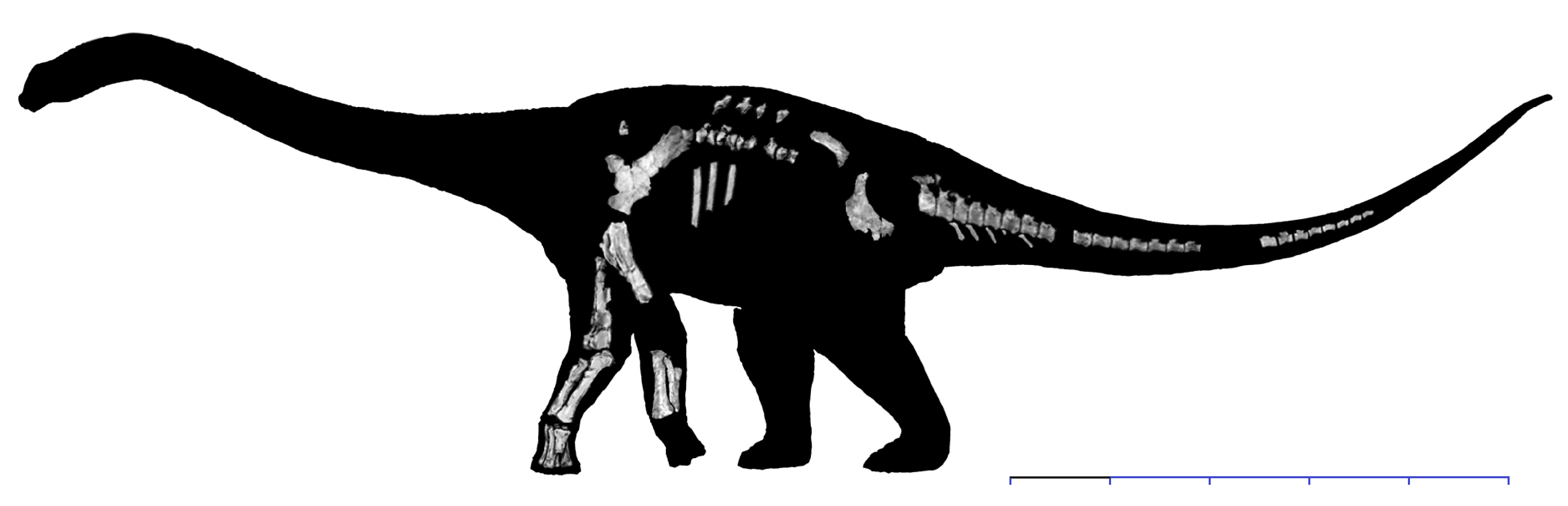
- Silhouette of Wintonotitan wattsi with known skeletal elements

Scientific classification
- Kingdom: Animalia
- Phylum: Chordata
- Class: Reptilia
- Clade: Dinosauria
- Clade: Saurischia
- Clade: †Sauropodomorpha
- Clade: †Sauropoda
- Clade: †Macronaria
- Clade: †Diamantinasauria (?)
- Genus: †Wintonotitan
- Species: †W. wattsi

Binomial name
- †Wintonotitan wattsi Hocknull et al., 2009

= Wintonotitan =

Wintonotitan Temporal range: Cenomanian, 95 Ma

Extinct genus of dinosaurs

Wintonotitan (meaning "Winton titan") is a genus of titanosauriform dinosaur from the Cenomanian-aged (Late Cretaceous) Winton Formation of Australia. It is known from partial postcranial remains.

== Description and history ==
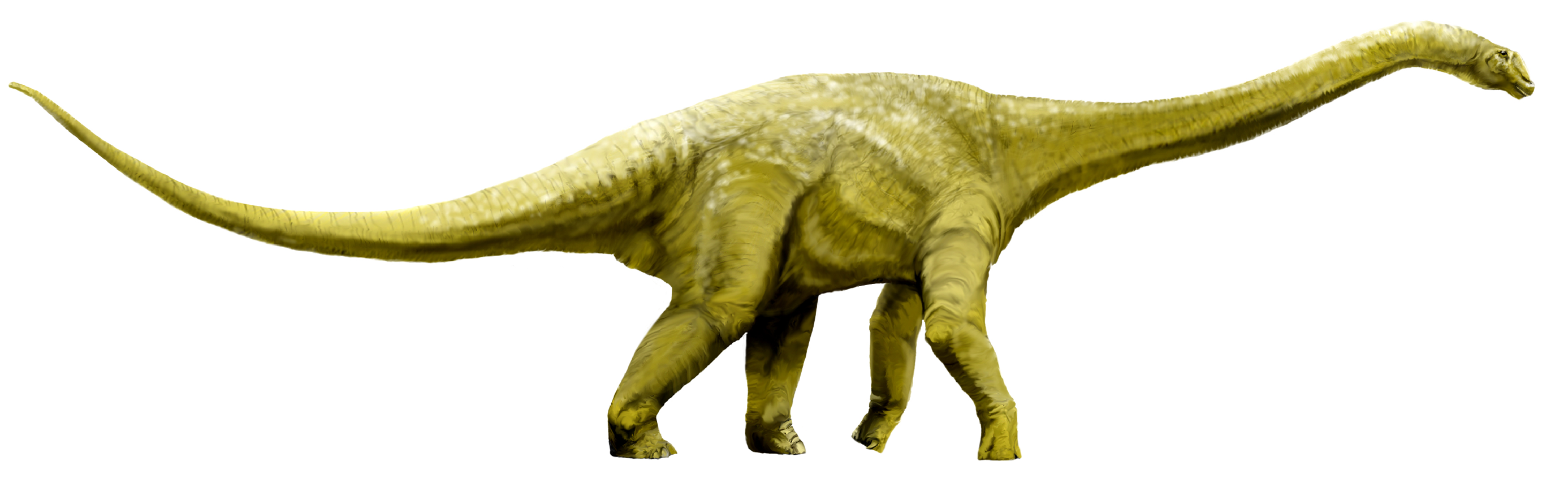
Life restoration

Fossils that are now known under the name Wintonotitan were first found in 1974 by Keith Watts. At the time, the specimens were assigned to an Austrosaurus sp., Austrosaurus then being the only named Australian Cretaceous sauropod genus. These fossils, catalogued as QMF 7292, consisted of a left shoulder blade, much of the forelimbs, a number of back, hip, and tail vertebrae, part of the right hip, ribs, chevrons, and unidentifiable fragments. QMF 7292 was established as the type specimen of Wintonotitan in 2009 by Scott Hocknull and colleagues. Hocknull suggested that Austrosaurus mckillopi differed only slightly from the QMF 7292, the holotype of Wintonotitan wattsii, and should be considered a nomen dubium. The type species is W. wattsi, honoring the original discoverer.

== Palaeoecology ==
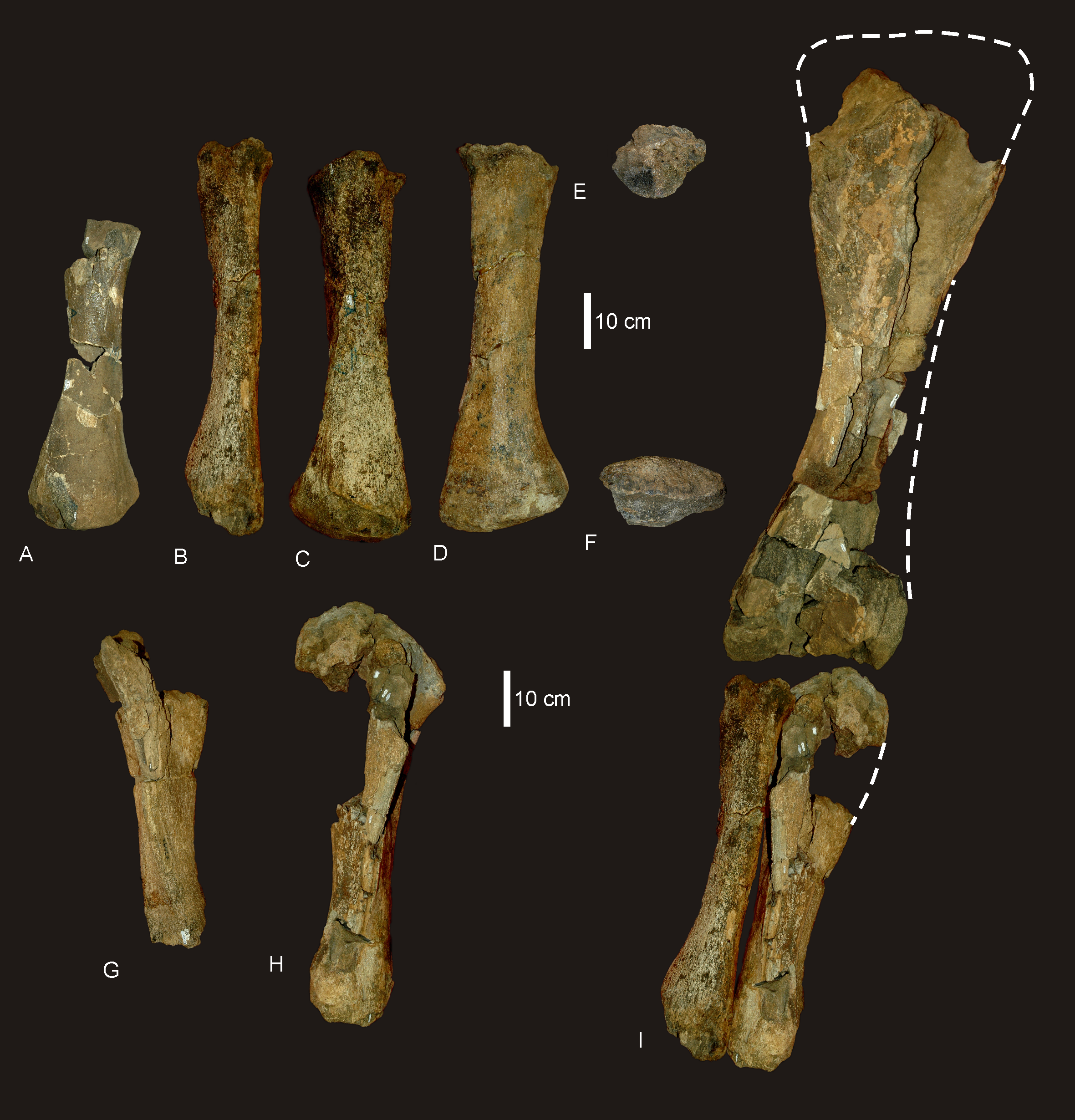
Arm bones

QMF 7292 was found about 60 kilometres (37 mi) northwest of Winton, near Elderslie Station. A second specimen, QMF 10916, consisting of isolated tail vertebrae, was found at Chorregan. Both were recovered from the lower part of the Winton Formation, dated to the Cenomanian. QMF 7292 was found in sandstone interpreted as a point bar of a river. Also found at the site were fish fragments, a theropod tooth, and a variety of plant fossils, including woody stems, branch impressions, cones and cone scales, and pieces of leaves. The Winton Formation had a faunal assemblage including bivalves, gastropods, insects, the lungfish Metaceratodus, turtles, the crocodilian Isisfordia, pterosaurs, and several types of dinosaurs, such as the theropod Australovenator, the sauropod Diamantinasaurus, and unnamed ankylosaurians and ornithopods. Wintonotitan bones can be distinguished from Diamantinasaurus bones because Wintonotitan bones are not as robust. Plants known from the formation include ferns, ginkgoes, gymnosperms, and angiosperms. Like other sauropods, Wintonotitan would have been a large quadrupedal herbivore.

== Classification ==
In their 2009 description, Hocknull et al. found Wintonotitan to be a non-titanosaurian titanosauriform sauropod in their phylogenetic analyses. A similar placement was also recovered in several analyses in the subsequent years, including by Poropat et al. (2021) in their description of Diamantinasaurus fossil material. Their results are displayed in the cladogram below:

- Somphospondyli
  - Dongbeititan
  - - Euhelopodidae
    - - - Sauroposeidon
        - - Tastavinsaurus
          - - Europatitan
            - - Ligabuesaurus
              - Cloverly titanosauriform
      - - Chubutisaurus
        - - Wintonotitan
          - - Huanghetitan
            - Titanosauria
              - Andesaurus
              - - Huabeisaurus
                - - - Dongyangosaurus
                    - Baotianmansaurus
                  - - Diamantinasauria
                      - Savannasaurus
                      - AODF 836
                      - Diamantinasaurus
                      - Sarmientosaurus
                    - - - Xianshanosaurus
                        - Daxiatitan
                      - - Lithostrotia

The phylogenetic placement of the contemporary sauropods in the Winton Formation (Australotitan, Diamantinasaurus, and Savannasaurus) has been contentious. While they are consistently found to nest together in a monophyletic clade called the Diamantinasauria, the placement of this clade is inconsistent between analyses. While some authors have found it in various placements within the Titanosauria, others recover it just outside of this clade. In their 2024 review and analysis of sauropod fossils from the Winton Formation, Beeston et al. reviewed the relationships of diamantinasaur specimens in a phylogenetic analysis, and recovered the clade as the sister taxon to the Titanosauria within the Somphospondyli. This marked the first time Wintonotitan was recovered within the Diamantinasauria. Their results are displayed in the cladogram below:

- Somphospondyli
  - Titanosauria
  - Diamantinasauria
    - Sarmientosaurus
    - - - Australotitan ("Cooper"; holotype, EMF102)
        - - AODF 0032 ("Mick"; possible distinct species)
          - AODF 0836 ("Alex"; referred to Diamantinasaurus)
          - Diamantinasaurus ("Matilda"; holotype, AODF 0603)
      - - AODF 2296 ("Leo"; possibly Wintonotitan)
        - - Wintonotitan ("Clancy"; holotype, QM F7292)
          - AODF 0665 ("Trixie"; Diamantinasauria incertae sedis)
          - AODF 0590 ("McKenzie"; Diamantinasauria incertae sedis)
          - AODF 0906 ("Ann"; referred to Diamantinasaurus)
          - Savannasaurus ("Wade"; holotype, AODF 0660)
