= Hatcherichnus =

Trace fossil classification
- Kingdom: Animalia
- Phylum: Chordata
- Class: Reptilia
- Clade: Pseudosuchia
- Clade: Crocodylomorpha
- Order: Crocodylia
- Ichnogenus: †Hatcherichnus; Foster and Lockley, 1997

Trace fossil

Hatcherichnus is a trace fossil ichnogenus from the Upper Jurassic Morrison Formation of the US, the Lastres Formation of Spain, and the Snake Creek Tracksite of the Winton Formation. The type material is from the Salt Wash Member of the Morrison Formation in southeastern Utah, although the name is in honor of John Bell Hatcher, who illustrated a referred specimen from the Morrison of Garden Park, Colorado, in 1903. The type specimen consists of natural casts of the manus and pes, plus a tail trace, preserved in the roof of a uranium mine. These traces are believed to be those of swimming or floating neosuchian crocodyliforms.
