= Winton Formation =

Geological formation in Queensland, Australia

- Stratigraphic range: Mid Cretaceous Late Albian–Early Turonian; ~103–93.9 Ma
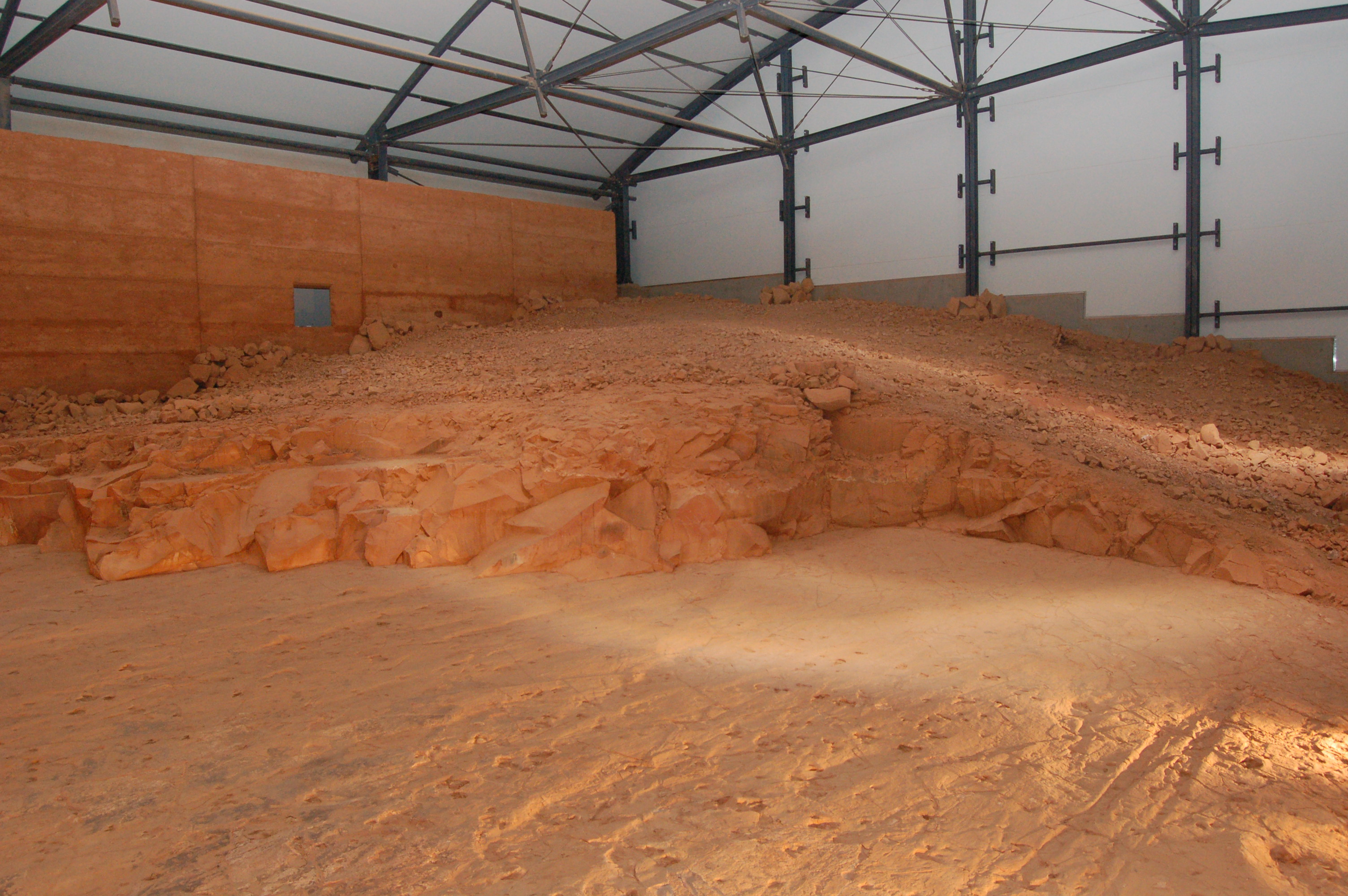
- Strata of the Winton Formation exposed at Lark Quarry
- Type: Geological formation
- Unit of: Rolling Downs Group
- Underlies: Unconformity with Quaternary Lake Eyre Basin sediments
- Overlies: Mackunda Formation,
- Thickness: Between 300 m (980 ft) and 1,000 m (3,300 ft)

Lithology
- Primary: Sandstone, siltstone, mudstone
- Other: Conglomerate, coal, arenite, claystone

Location
- Coordinates: 22.3°S 143.1°E
- Approximate paleocoordinates: 51.8°S 134.1°E
- Region: Queensland
- Country: Australia
- Extent: Eromanga Basin

Type section
- Named for: Winton, Queensland
- Named by: Whitehouse
- Location: Bores in and around Winton
- Year defined: 1955
- Winton Formation (Australia) Winton Formation (Queensland)

The Winton Formation is an Early to Late Cretaceous geological formation, mainly in central-western Queensland, Australia. It is late Albian to early Turonian in age, between ~103 and 93.9 million years ago, and is the latest formation of the Rolling Downs Group. The formation blankets large areas of central-western Queensland, as well as northwestern South Australia, the southwestern corner of the Northern Territory, and parts of northern New South Wales.

== Geology ==
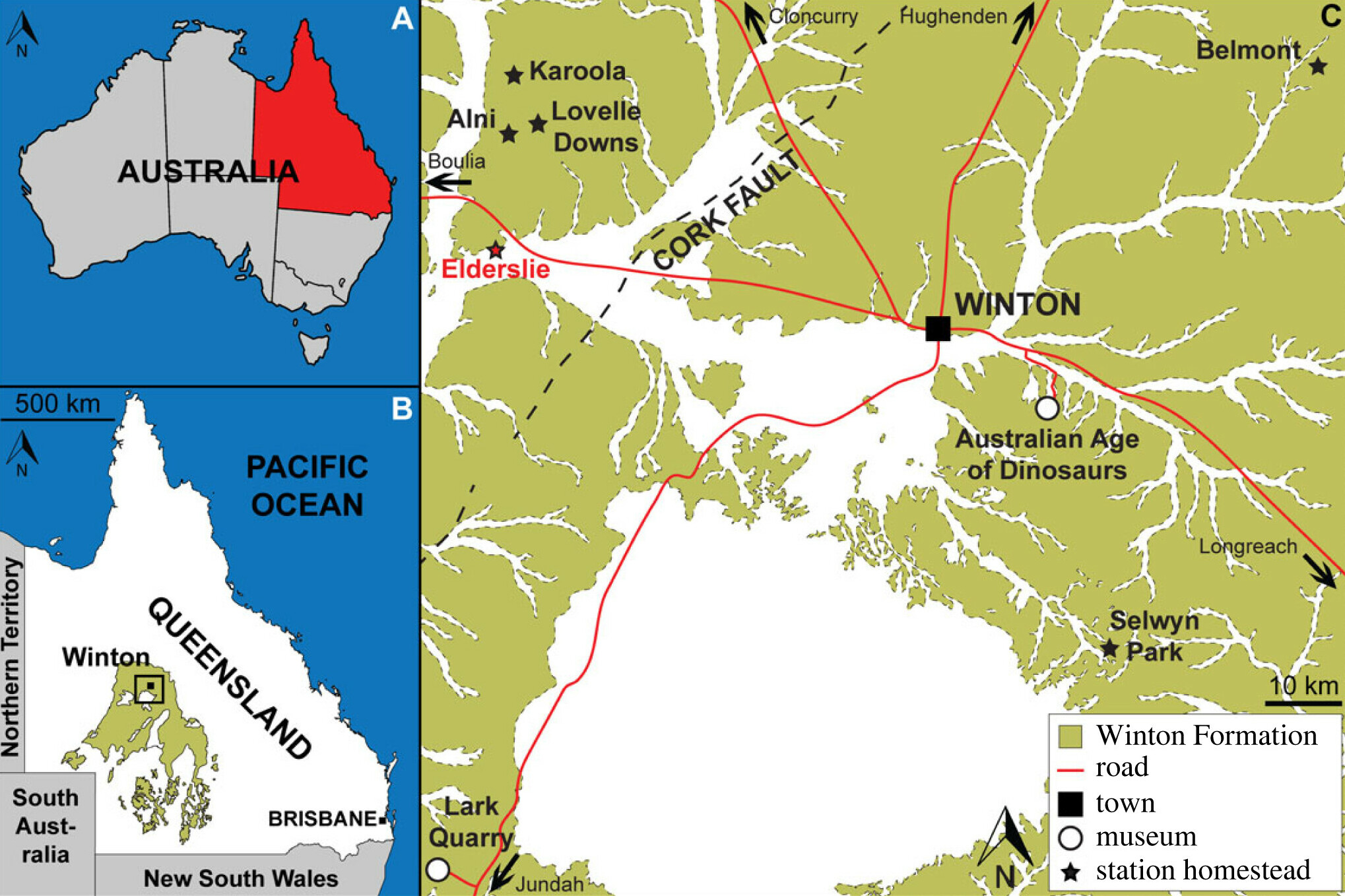
Map showing the extent of the Winton Formation within Queensland, and in the vicinity of the town of Winton specifically

The Winton Formation, a subject of interest for both basic research and economic geology, is stratigraphically widely established to be the uppermost unit of the Manuka Subgroup, conformably overlying the marine Mackunda Formation, also forming the uppermost strata of the Rolling Downs Group. It also underlies Paleogene or younger Cenozoic strata. Significant erosion of the Winton Formation has oxidised palynomorphs in layers close to the surface, once limiting the capacity to estimate the youngest age of deposition. However, U-Pb isotope dating with laser ablation of detrital zircons later enabled more precise dating, suggesting that sedimentation of the Winton Formation concluded around or after the Cenomanian–Turonian boundary, about ~93.9 million years ago. The same results also suggest that deposition began in the latest Albian, between ~103 to 100.5 million years ago. The strata of the Winton Formation consists primarily of sedimentary rocks such as volcanolithic sandstone, siltstone, mudstone, arenite and claystone, within complex facies. Pockets of coal deposits and intraformational conglomerates also known.

Localities in the greater Winton region which host fossils, such as those in the Belmont, Elderslie and Lovelle Downs Stations, Lark Quarry, and the Bladensburg National Park, all come from a layer of the Winton Formation which was settled during the late Cenomanian to early Turonian epochs, about ~93.9 million years ago. These possess a number of distinct facies and horizons associations that are rather continuous across the area. Other localities, such as in the Isisford area, were deposited about 10 million years earlier during the late Albian to early Cenomanian epochs, between ~103–100.5 million years ago. With this knowledge, the age of the upper Mackunda Formation was constrained to the latest Albian, about ~104 to 102 million years ago, which also constrains the age of the early Cretaceous layers of the Winton Formation to be no older than this.

== Hydrology ==
The sediment localities in the wider Winton region indicate that the upper layers of the Winton Formation were derived from freshwater and terrestrial depositional environments. This is further supported by the occurrence of freshwater gastropods like Melanoides and freshwater bivalves such as Hyridella and Megalovirgus. Previous studies have proposed that lakes may have been present at sites including near Lovelle Downs Station, and the Lark Quarry Conservation Park. However more recent findings have revealed that the lacustrine sedimentation required for this proposal did not occur during or even before the creation of the track-bearing surface at Lark Quarry, and lakes were seemingly only a small portion of a landscape that consisted primarily of channels and floodplains. While older sediments are suggested to have been deposited in brackish waters, perhaps in a fluvial-deltaic setting influenced by tides along the Eromanga Sea, the younger strata occur in sediments which indicate a more terrestrial and freshwater alluvial plain.

The sheer thickness of the Winton Formation in some areas (about 1,000 metres (3,300 ft)) suggest that there was once a large river system, which over a span of at least 10 million years in a variety of forms, filled the Eromanga Sea, with periods in which this river flowed southwest as part of the continental Ceduna River system. The primarily siltstone as well as mudstone and dolostone sediments of the formation host plant fossils are associated with trough and tabular cross-stratification, current ripple cross-lamination, and possible ox-bow lakes, giving further evidence that the upper layers of the Winton Formation represents a meandering river system, and have indeed been confirmed by detailed sedimentological studies.

== Palaeoclimate ==
The Winton Formation was once treated as representing a single palaeoenvironment in older palaeoclimatic studies, regarding it as a generally warm temperate ecosystem. Although the presence of coal suggested humidity, the composition of the floral biota was interpreted to indicate dry conditions. More recently, higher resolution dating of the local biota communities and additional fossils described in the last 25 years allows for an improved investigation of the local palaeoclimate.

Various methods have been utilized to study the palaeoclimate of the late Cretaceous layers of the Winton Formation in better detail. Research has found that the palaeoclimate was quite warm (~16 °C (61 °F) mean annual temperature) and wet (1,300 millimetres (51 in) mean annual precipitation), estimated by the foliar physiognomcic methods of Climate Leaf Analysis Multivariate Program, Leaf Area Analysis and Leaf Margin Analysis, as well as mutual climatic range methods hailed from the floral assemblage. However high and seasonal precipitation appears to have been, it was lower than in modern highland forests today, neither were there any indications of the usual extremes of dry and wet as known from modern monsoons. For instance, in modern Darwin, often a victim of monsoonal weather patterns, the cumulative three driest months receive about 8.1 millimetres (0.32 in), while the wettest months receive an average of 1,120 millimetres (44 in) in rainfall. Compared with the late Cretaceous strata of the Winton Formation, estimated to have received about 268 ± 137 millimetres (10.6 ± 5.4 in) during the driest three months, and 630 ± 206 millimetres (24.8 ± 8.1 in) in the three wettest months. Additionally, growth indices on fossil wood indicate that climate variables differed between years, to the point that it had an observable influence on ring width in podocarp-like wood. This variability seems to be oscillatory and systemic, reflecting a similar phenomena to the Pacific Decadal Oscillation were driving patterns of climate in the mid Cretaceous.

Alongside botanical indicators, parts of the fauna are also climatically informative. For instance, crocodyliform fossils are known from the late Cretaceous layers of the Winton Formation on Elderslie Station, about 60 kilometres (37 mi) northwest of Winton. With the assumption that these remains are referable to Isisfordia duncani or a related species, and if eusuchians are accepted palaeothermometers, their occurrence supports a mean average temp of >16 °C (61 °F). Additionally, modern lungfish, serving as analogues for Metaceratodus ellioti, also from the upper strata of the Winton Formation, have a distribution that is limited to the tropics and subtropics. Undescribed freshwater turtles also from these same rocks also suggest a degree of warmth, as even cold-adapted modern turtles require warmest mean monthly temperatures over 17.5 °C (63.5 °F).

== Paleobiota ==
Color key: Taxon / Reclassified taxon / Taxon falsely reported as present / Dubious taxon or junior synonym / Ichnotaxon / Ootaxon / Morphotaxon

Notes
Uncertain or tentative taxa are in small text
~~crossed out~~ taxa are discredited.

=== Crocodyliformes ===
Crocodylomorphs of the Winton Formation
| Genus | Species | Locality | Material | Notes | Image |
|---|---|---|---|---|---|
| Confractosuchus | C. sauroktonos | Elderslie Station, upper Winton Formation | an almost complete skull and semi-complete postcranial skeleton with osteoderms | A eusuchian crocodylomorph, closely related to susisuchids and hylaeochampsids, found with ornithopod remains in its gut. | |
| Isisfordia | I. duncani | field locality QM L1021, near Isisford | two partial skeletons and two partial skulls | A susisuchid crocodylomorph | |

=== Ornithischians ===
Ornithischians of the Winton Formation
| Genus | Species | Locality | Material | Notes | Image |
|---|---|---|---|---|---|
| Ornithopoda undesc. | sp. undesc. | Isisford | "a nearly complete skull and mandible and at least three partial postcranial skeletons." | Claimed to represent the most complete ornithopod from Australia and one of the most complete basal ornithopod skulls in the world. Closely related to elasmarians | |
| Ankylosauria indet. | sp. indet. | Elliot Site, Belmont Station | three isolated teeth | Distinct from all other Gondwanan ankylosaur teeth | |
| Neornithischia indet. | sp. indet. | "within 40m of the stratigraphic base of the Winton Formation" | a single tooth | Very similar to Atlascopcosaurus and Qantassaurus teeth. | |
| Ornithopoda indet. | sp. indet. | Elderslie Station, upper Winton Formation | partial skeleton | A non-iguanodontian ornithopod specimen found in the gut of Confractosuchus. | |

=== Pterosaurs ===
Pterosaurs of the Winton Formation
| Genus | Species | Locality | Material | Notes | Image |
|---|---|---|---|---|---|
| Ferrodraco | F. lentoni | AODL 245, Belmont Station | partial skeleton | A large anhanguerid, the most complete pterosaur known from Australia | Fossil snout of F. lentoni. |
| Anhangueria indet. | sp. indet. | Elliot Site | partial left femur | | |

=== Sauropods ===
Sauropods of the Winton Formation
| Genus | Species | Locality | Material | Notes | Image |
|---|---|---|---|---|---|
| Australotitan | A. cooperensis | EML011(a), EML010 & EML013 | multiple appendicular elements | A giant diamantinasaurian somphospondylan, the largest known from Australia. May be a synonym of Diamantinasaurus. | Holotype bone of A. cooperensis. |
| Diamantinasaurus | D. matildae | Matilda Site, Elderslie Station; Alex Site, Belmont Station | partial appendicular skeleton; very fragmentary skeleton; partial cranial and appendicular skeleton; nearly complete skull; multiple isolated elements | A diamantinasaurian somphospondylan. The most complete sauropod known from Australia. | Reconstruction of D. matildae. |
| Savannasaurus | S. elliottorum | Ho-Hum Site, Belmont Station; AODL 0137, Elderslie Station | distarticulated partial skeleton; isolated caudal vertebrae and fourth metacarpal | A diamantinasaurian somphospondylan with an unusually wide body. | Savannasaurus skeleton. |
| Wintonotitan | W. wattsi | Triangle Paddock, Elderslie Station; Chorregan, Winton; AODL 0160, Lovelle Downs Station; QM F10916, Selwyn Park Station; EML010 and EML012, Plevna Downs Station | partial skeleton; many isolated caudal vertebrae | A diamantinasaurian somphospondylan. | Reconstruction of W. wattsi. |

=== Theropods ===
Theropods of the Winton Formation
| Genus | Species | Locality | Material | Clade | Image |
|---|---|---|---|---|---|
| Australovenator | A. wintonensis | Matilda Site, Elderslie Station | partial skeleton preserving cranial and appendicular elements, with an almost complete hindlimb | A megaraptorid megaraptoran, known from quite complete remains | Partial skeleton of Australovenator. |
| Megaraptoridae indet. | Indeterminate | Marilyn Site, Elderslie Station | caudal vertebrae and metatarsals | A megaraptorid that differs from Australovenator, may represent a new taxon. | |

=== Other amniotes ===
Other amniotes of the Winton Formation
| Genus | Species | Clade | Image |
|---|---|---|---|
| Chelidae indet. | sp. indet. | Testudines, Chelidae | |
| Cynodontia indet. | sp. indet. | Cynodontia, incertae sedis | |
| Plesiosauria indet. | sp. indet. | Plesiosauria, incertae sedis | |
| Varanoidea indet. (Formerly described as cf. Coniasaurus) | sp. indet. | Squamata, Varanoidea incertae sedis | |

=== Fishes ===
Fishes of the Winton Formation
| Genus | Species | Clade | Image |
|---|---|---|---|
| Cladocyclus | C. geddesi | Ichthyodectiformes, Cladocyclidae | |
| Metaceratodus | M. ellioti | Ceratodontiformes, Ceratodontidae | |
| Metaceratodus | M. wollastoni | Ceratodontiformes, Ceratodontidae | |
| Selachii indet. | sp. indet. | Elasmobranchii, Selachii incertae sedis | |

=== Ichnotaxa ===
Vertebrate ichnotaxa of the Winton Formation
| Genus | Species | Clade | Image |
|---|---|---|---|
| Amblydactylus | A. gethingi | Ornithopoda, incertae sedis | |
| Amblydactylus | cf. A. gethingi | Ornithopoda, incertae sedis | |
| Hatcherichnus | H. isp. | Crocodyliformes, incertae sedis | |
| Iguanodontipus | cf. I. isp. | Ornithopoda, incertae sedis | |
| Skartopus | S. australis | Theropoda, Grallatoridae | |
| Wintonopus | W. latomorum | Ornithopoda, incertae sedis | Cast of W. latomorum. |
| Actinopterygii indet. | isp. indet. (two forms) | | |
| Sauropoda indet. | isp. indet. | Sauropoda, incertae sedis | |
| Testudines indet. | isp. indet. | ?Testudines, incertae sedis | |
| Theropoda indet. | isp. indet. | Theropoda, incertae sedis | |

=== Arthropods ===
Arthropods of the Winton Formation
| Genus | Species | Clade | Image |
|---|---|---|---|
| Coleoptera indet. | sp. indet. | Coleoptera, incertae sedis | |
| Mecoptera indet. | sp. indet. | Mecoptera, incertae sedis | |
| Odonata indet. | sp. indet. | Odonata, incertae sedis | |
| Oribatida? indet. | sp. indet. | ?Oribatida, incertae sedis | |

=== Molluscs ===
Molluscs of the Winton Formation
| Genus | Species | Clade | Image |
|---|---|---|---|
| Alathyria | A. jaqueti | Unionida, Hyriidae | |
| Melanoides | M. sp. | Cerithioidea, Thiaridae | |
| Hyridella | H. (H.) macmichaeli | Unionida, Hyriidae | |
| Megalovirgus | M. wintonensis | Unionida, Hyriidae | |
| Protovirgus | P. wintonensis | Unionida, Iridinidae | |

=== Flora ===
Flora of the Winton Formation
| Genus | Species | Clade | Image |
|---|---|---|---|
| Araucaria | A. sp. | Araucariales, Araucariaceae | |
| Araucaria | A. cf. fletcheri | Araucariales, Araucariaceae | |
| Araucaria | A. cf. mesozoica | Araucariales, Araucariaceae | |
| Austrosequoia | A. wintonensis | Cupressales, Cupressaceae | |
| Austrosequoia | cf. A. wintonensis | Cupressales, Cupressaceae | |
| Cladophlebis | C. sp. | Osmundales, Osmundaceae | Fossils of the related C. remota. |
| Elatocladus | cf. E. plana | Araucariales, Podocarpaceae | |
| Emwadea | E. microcarpa | Araucariales, Araucariaceae | |
| Equisetites | E. sp. | Equisetales, Equisetaceae | |
| Ginkgo | G. wintonensis, four other possible species | Ginkgoales, Ginkgoaceae | |
| Lovellea | L. wintonensis | Magnoliophyta, Laurales | |
| Lygodium | aff. ?L. sp. | Schizaeales, Lygodiaceae | |
| Marchantites | M. marguerita | Hepaticales, incertae sedis | |
| Microphyllopteris | cf. M. gleichenoides | Gleicheniales, Gleicheniaceae | |
| Otozamites | cf. O. bengalensis | Bennettitales, Williamsoniaceae | |
| Phyllopteroides | P. macclymontae | Osmundales, Osmundaceae | |
| Protophyllocladoxylon | P. owensii | Araucariales, Podocarpaceae | |
| Pterostoma | P. sp. | ?Cycadales, incertae sedis | |
| Ptilophyllum | P. fasciatum | Bennettitales, Williamsoniaceae | Fossil of the related Ptilophyllum sp. |
| Ptilophyllum | P. sp. | Bennettitales, Williamsoniaceae | Fossil of the related Ptilophyllum sp. |
| Sphenopteris | cf. S. warragulensis | Lyginopteridales, Lyginopteridaceae | |
| Sphenopteris | S. sp. | Lyginopteridales, Lyginopteridaceae | |
| Taeniopteris | T. sp. | Tracheophytes, incertae sedis | |
| Tempskya | T. judithae | Polypodiidae, Tempskyaceae | Reconstruction of T. sp. |
| Angiospermae indet. | sp. indet. | Angiospermae, incertae sedis | |
| Araucariaceae indet. | sp. indet. | Araucariales, Araucariaceae | |
| Cheirolepidiaceae indet. | spp. indet. | Pinales, Cheirolepidiaceae | |

== See also ==
- Lark Quarry Conservation Park
- Australian Age of Dinosaurs, which operates the Australian Age of Dinosaurs Museum of Natural History, and holds annual dinosaur digs in the Winton Formation
- List of dinosaur-bearing rock formations
- South Polar region of the Cretaceous
