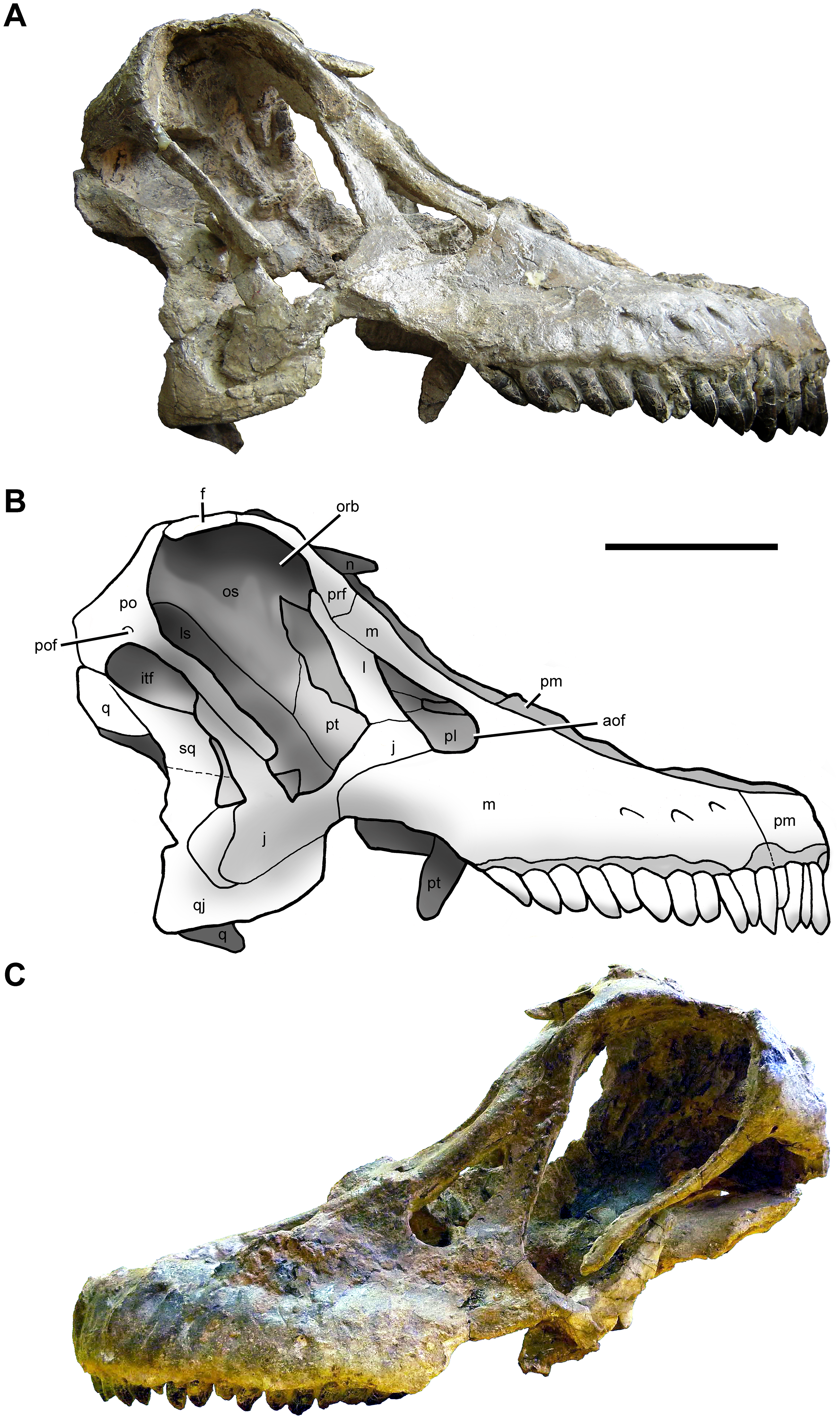
- Skull in side views

Scientific classification
- Kingdom: Animalia
- Phylum: Chordata
- Class: Reptilia
- Clade: Dinosauria
- Clade: Saurischia
- Clade: †Sauropodomorpha
- Clade: †Sauropoda
- Clade: †Macronaria
- Clade: †Titanosauriformes
- Clade: †Somphospondyli
- Clade: †Diamantinasauria
- Genus: †Sarmientosaurus; Martínez et al., 2016

Type species
- Sarmientosaurus musacchioi Martínez et al., 2016

= Sarmientosaurus =

Sarmientosaurus Temporal range: Cenomanian-Turonian

Extinct genus of dinosaurs

Sarmientosaurus is a genus of titanosaurian sauropod dinosaur belonging to the Titanosauria. It lived in what is now South America, specifically Argentina, during the Upper Cretaceous Period about 95 million years ago. The type species is Sarmientosaurus musacchioi.

== Discovery ==
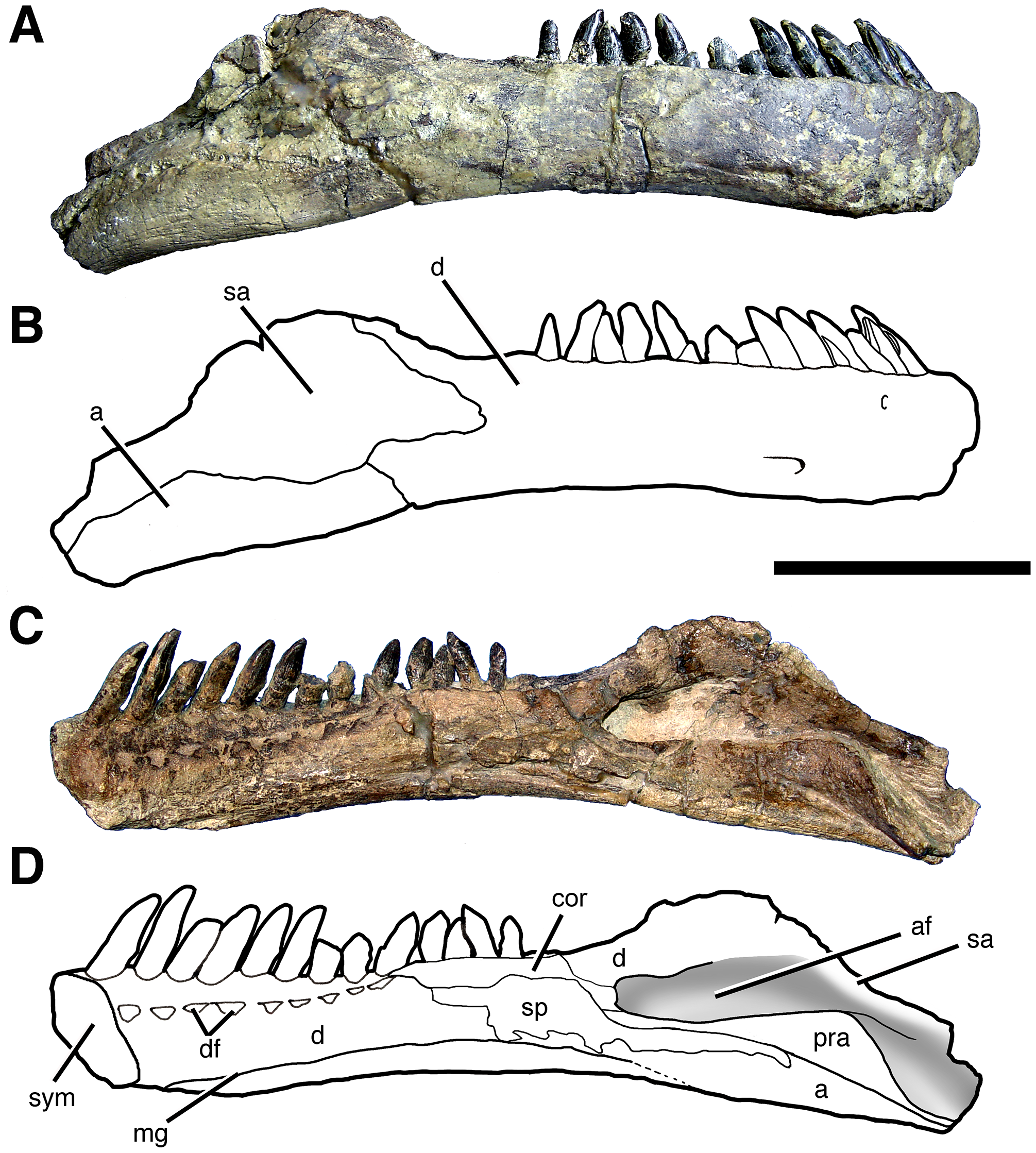
Right lower jaw

In 1997, paleontologist Rubén D.F. Martínez, at the Estancia Laguna Palacios of the Goicoechea family in Chubut province, discovered a sauropod skull. This proved to be connected to the first few cervical vertebrae.

In 2016, the type species Sarmientosaurus musacchioi was named and described by Rubén Darío Francisco Martínez, Matthew Carl Lamanna, Fernando Emilio Novas, Ryan C. Ridgely, Gabriel Andrés Casal, Javier E. Martínez, Javier R. Vita and Lawrence M. Witmer. The generic name refers to the town of Sarmiento. The specific name honours the late Eduardo Musacchio, an educator at the Universidad Nacional de la Patagonia San Juan Bosco. The Life Science Identifiers are 537DFE26-54EC-4978-AC86-E83A04FA74DE for the genus and C1090B8D-D051-44F3-B869-8B4A0C802176 for the species.

The holotype, MDT-PV 2, was found in the upper Lower Member of the Bajo Barreal Formation, dating from the Cenomanian to Turonian ages. It consists of an almost complete skull with lower jaws, articulated with the first seven vertebrae of the front neck. Several neck parts, among them the entire atlas and fourth neck vertebra, were too eroded to be salvaged. The specimen represents an elderly individual. It is one of the few titanosaurs for which skull material has been found. Uniquely, at the side of the neck an elongated structure was discovered that was identified as an ossified tendon.

From the Bajo Barreal Formation another titanosaur sauropod is known, Epachthosaurus. It cannot be determined whether both taxa are identical because the material of their holotypes is not overlapping. However, the authors considered an identity as improbable because in their cladistic analysis both genera occupied different positions in the evolutionary tree. Also, fragmentary fossils, of postcranial bones that differ from those of Epachthosaurus and skull bones that are dissimilar to the Sarmientosaurus cranium, show that in any case several titanosaur species were present in the habitat.

== Description ==
3D video of the skull

=== Size and distinguishing traits ===
The describing authors indicated nine unique distinguishing traits, autapomorphies. The eye socket is large, equalling 40% of the length of the skull. The ascending branch of the maxilla has a complex connection with a top process of the lacrimal bone, being wedged between its outer side and inner side. The inner edge of the rear part of the ascending branch of the maxilla touches the rim of the bony nostril with a low but distinct ridge. The ascending branch of the quadratojugal has at its lower rear a tongue-shaped process overlapping the rear of the quadrate. In the braincase there are three separate exits for the nervus trigeminus. An inner vein channel connecting the infundibulum with the brains stem, is lacking. The premaxillary teeth are positioned vertically, the maxillary teeth are inclining to the front and the dentary teeth are inclining to the rear. The middle neck vertebrae have strut-like, instead of plate-shaped, ridges between the front joint processes and the vertebral centrum. A long and thin ossified tendon is running along the low side of the series of neck vertebrae and neck ribs.

=== Skeleton ===
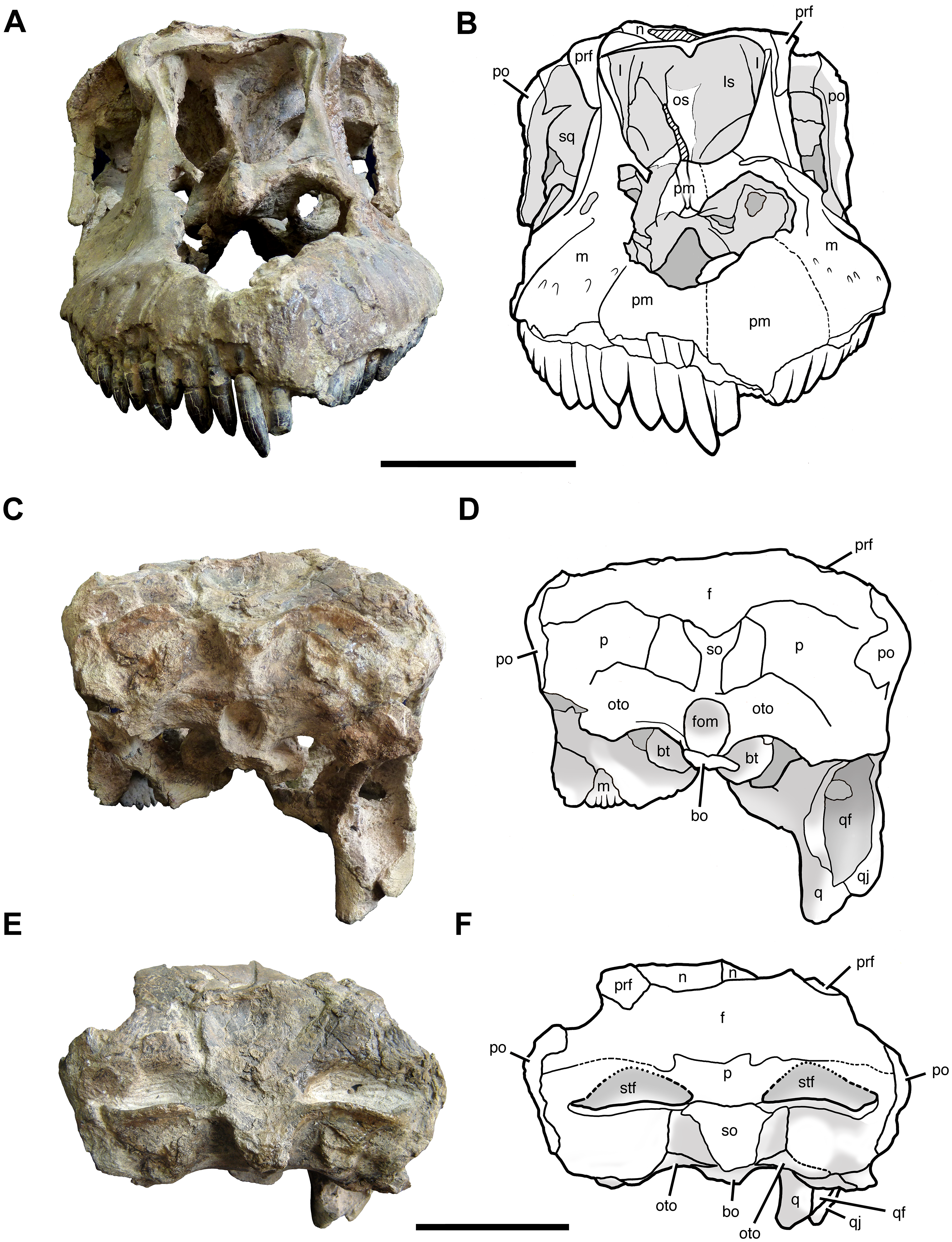
Skull in front and hind views

The skull has a length of forty-three centimetres. In top view the skull is more or less tongue-shaped. The antorbital fenestra is small but the eye socket is exceptionally large. In side view the snout is flat with a concave upper profile and surface. The maxilla touches the prefrontal. The jugal bone has an unusual L-shape with a very long front branch and an almost absent rear branch. The fifth cranial nerve, the nervus trigeminus, has extra exits for the branches towards the maxilla and the lower jaw, whereas other sauropods possess but single exit. The front of the lower jaw has an almost constant height.

The praemaxilla bears four teeth, the maxilla eleven (right side) or twelve (left), and the dentary thirteen. The premaxillary teeth are positioned vertically, the maxillary teeth incline to the front while the teeth of the lower jaw incline to behind, a unique configuration. The build of the teeth is in-between the more spatulate form of basal sauropods and the pencil shape of derived species. The teeth are moderately elongated. They each have sharply-angled wear facets in a high and a low position which, together with their strange orientation, indicates some special, as yet not fully understood, way of cropping vegetation.

The neck vertebrae are long and elongated. Their internal structure is camellated, i.e. with many small air spaces inside. The middle neck vertebrae have oval, narrow and deep pleurocoels in their sides, pneumatic excavations that nearly touch each other on the midline, separated by a narrow bone plate. The rear joint processes are uncommonly long, reaching beyond the edge of the vertebral body. The front joint processes are supported from below by struts with an oval cross-section, apparently formed by a perforation of the normally plate-shaped ridges in this position. The neck ribs are delicate, thin and rod-shaped.

=== Ossified tendon ===
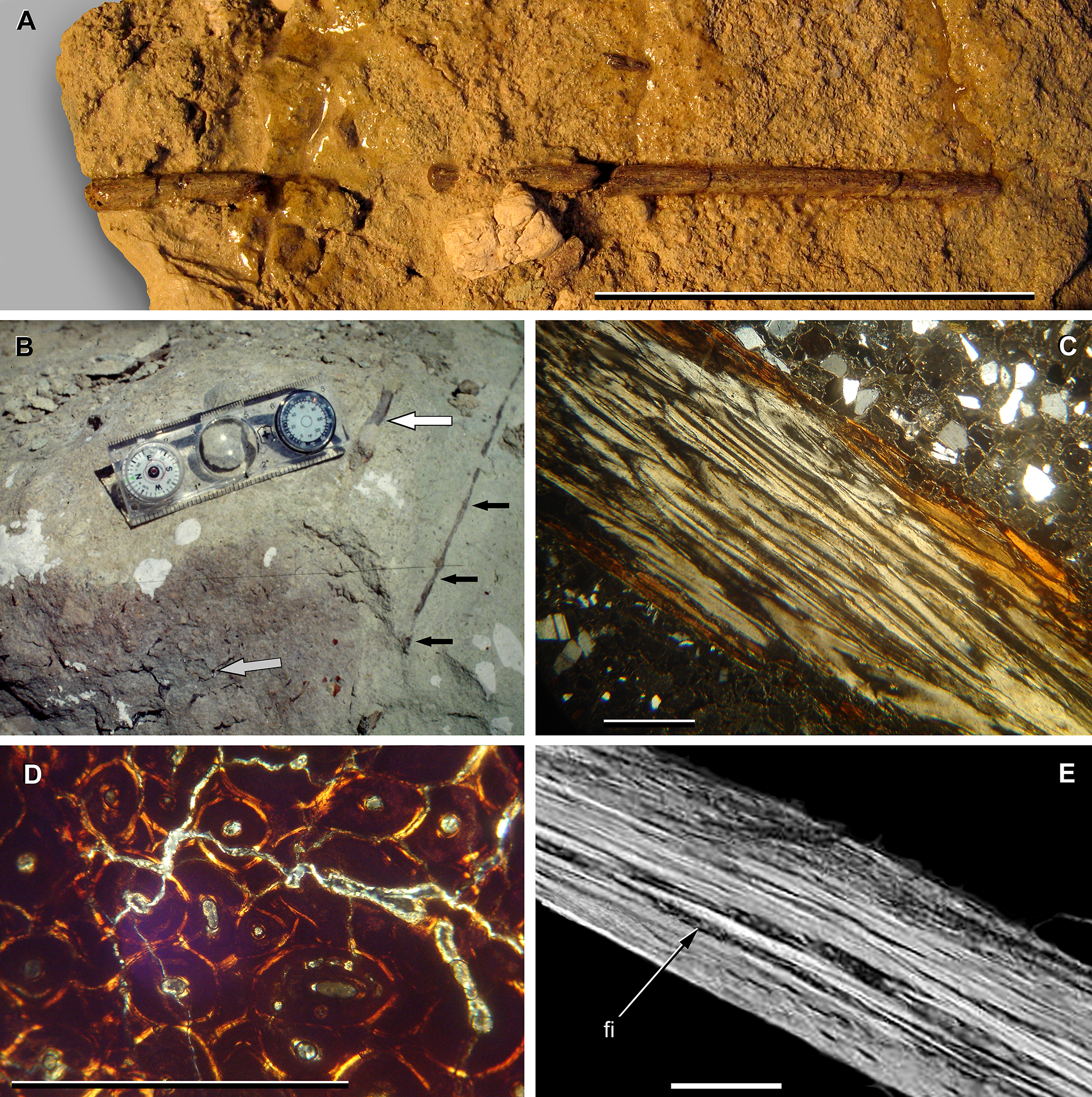
Ossified cervical tendon

Parallel to the ribs, on the outer side of the neck a cable-shaped structure was discovered with a constant diameter of three millimetres. It had an oval cross-section and a rough and striated surface. The structure originated directly behind the skull and continued over a length of several vertebrae, thus of some metres. It was interpreted by the describing authors as an ossified tendon. The alternative hypothesis that it might be a neck rib was rejected because the ribs are thicker and should have a different position. Such tendons might have been a continuation of the neck ribs, but again, its position did not confirm this. Instead, it was assumed to have been internal to some neck muscle. Such ossified tendons have never before been found in any fossil dinosaur but some extant bird groups such as the cranes show them, though they are relatively shorter, at most two vertebrae long. Possible muscles, where it could have been located, are the Musculus rectus capitis anterior ventralis, the Musculus longus colli ventralis or the Musculi intertransversarii. The internal structure of the tendon, with much reworked bone tissue, indicated a swift ossification at a young age.

== Classification ==
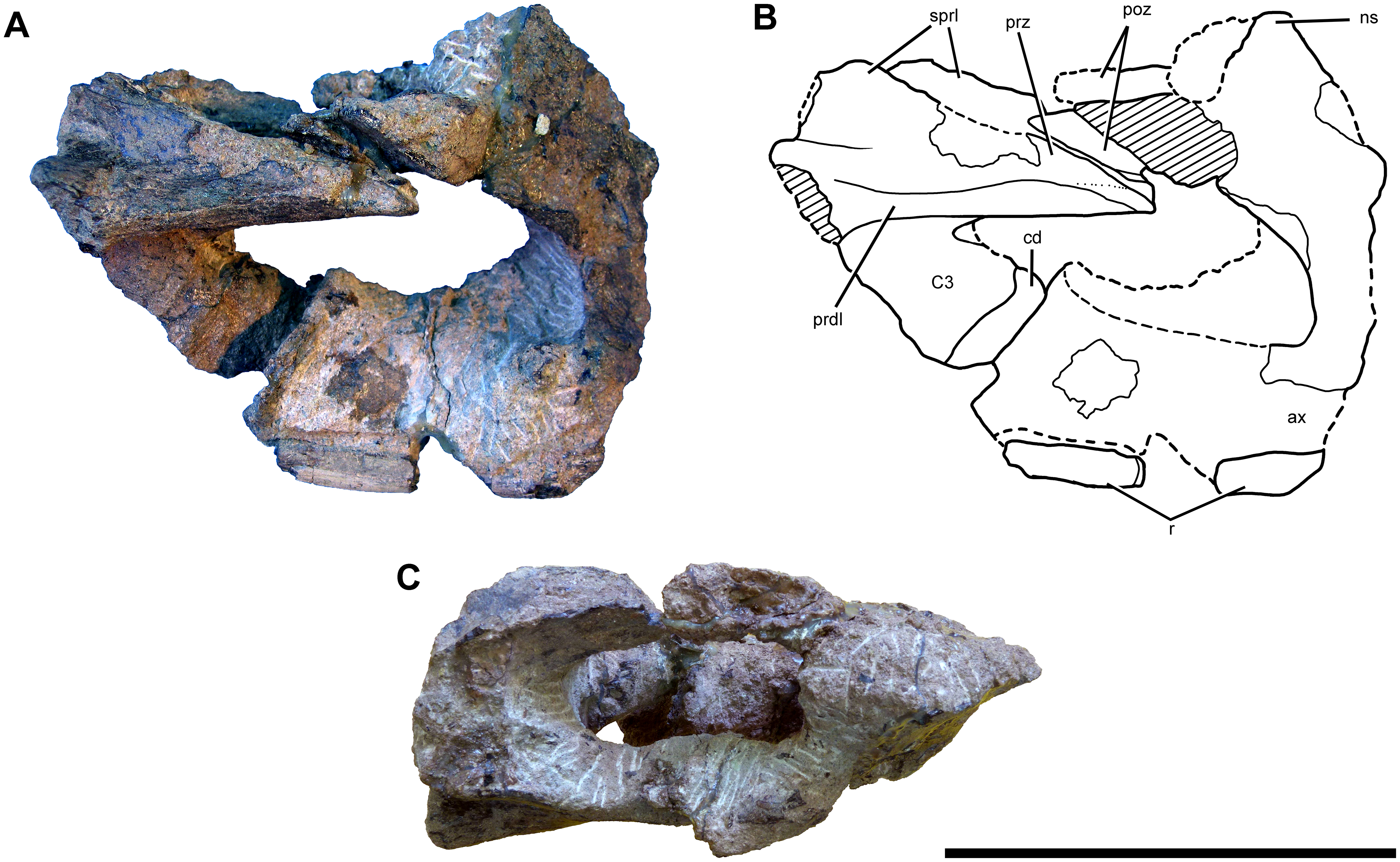
Axis and neck vertebra

Martínez and colleagues placed Sarmientosaurus in a basal position within the clade Lithostrotia, above Malawisaurus in the evolutionary tree. However, in 2021, Stephen Poropat and colleagues instead identified it as part of the new clade Diamantinasauria, along with Savannasaurus and Diamantinasaurus.

== Palaeobiology ==
It had very large eye sockets, meaning that it may have had better vision than other titanosaurs. Based on the ear and neck tendon, Sarmientosaurus most likely hung its head and neck down "like an enormous Eeyore". This posture implies that Sarmientosaurus may have eaten much lower-lying plants than other sauropods. The correlation between inner ear structure and head posture has been questioned in previous studies.

== See also ==
- 2016 in paleontology
