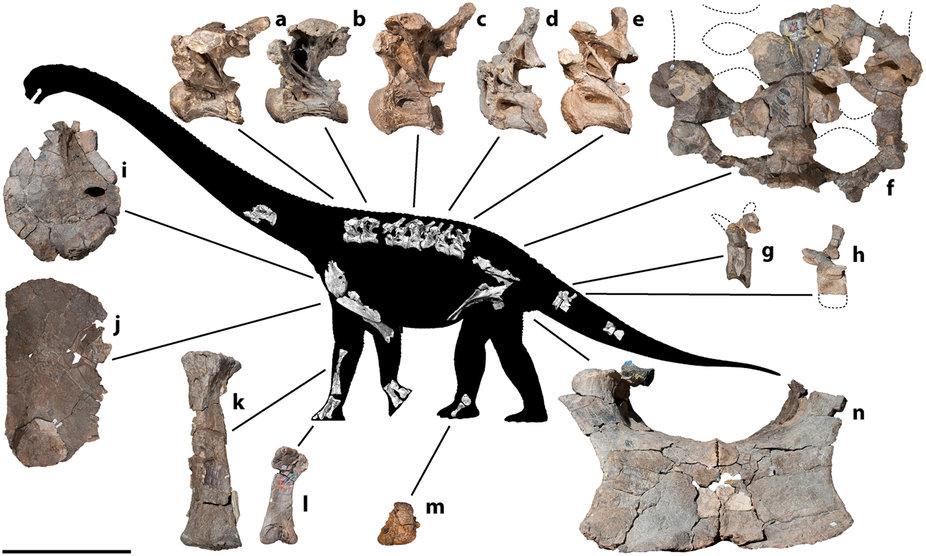
- Skeletal diagram and selected fossils

Scientific classification
- Kingdom: Animalia
- Phylum: Chordata
- Clade: Dinosauria
- Clade: Saurischia
- Clade: †Sauropodomorpha
- Clade: †Sauropoda
- Clade: †Macronaria
- Genus: †Savannasaurus; Poropat et al. 2016
- Species: †S. elliottorum

Binomial name
- †Savannasaurus elliottorum Poropat et al. 2016

= Savannasaurus =

Savannasaurus Temporal range: Cenomanian–Lower Turonian, ~93.9 Ma

Extinct genus of dinosaurs

Savannasaurus is a genus of titanosaurian sauropod dinosaur from the Late Cretaceous Winton Formation of Queensland, Australia. It contains one species, Savannasaurus elliottorum, named in 2016 by Stephen Poropat and colleagues. The holotype and only known specimen, originally nicknamed "Wade", is the most complete specimen of an Australian sauropod, and is held at the Australian Age of Dinosaurs museum. Dinosaurs known from contemporary rocks include its close relative Diamantinasaurus and the theropod Australovenator; associated teeth suggest that Australovenator may have fed on the holotype specimen.

At 15 metres (49 ft) long, Savannasaurus was a medium-sized titanosaur. It is notable for its wide hips, which would have been over 1.1 metres (3 ft 7 in) wide at their widest points. This would have distributed its body weight more evenly, along with a robust humerus (upper arm bones) and possibly also the tall astragalus (ankle bone). Combined with a flexible vertebral column, these traits would have made Savannasaurus better at navigating the muddy ground of the floodplains that it lived on. Other titanosaur lineages also show some of these traits, which might have been independently acquired from similar environmental pressures.

Various traits suggest that Savannasaurus was an early-diverging (or basal) member of the Titanosauria, but not a member of the more specialized group Lithostrotia. Among these are the absence of hyposphene-hypantrum articulations in its vertebrae, which was one of the flexibility-enhancing traits that may have appeared in multiple titanosaur lineages. Palaeobiogeographic analyses suggest that the ancestors of Savannasaurus and Diamantinasaurus were from either Asia or one of the southern Gondwanan continents; regardless, they likely migrated to Australia through Antarctica around 105–100 million years ago.

== Discovery and naming ==
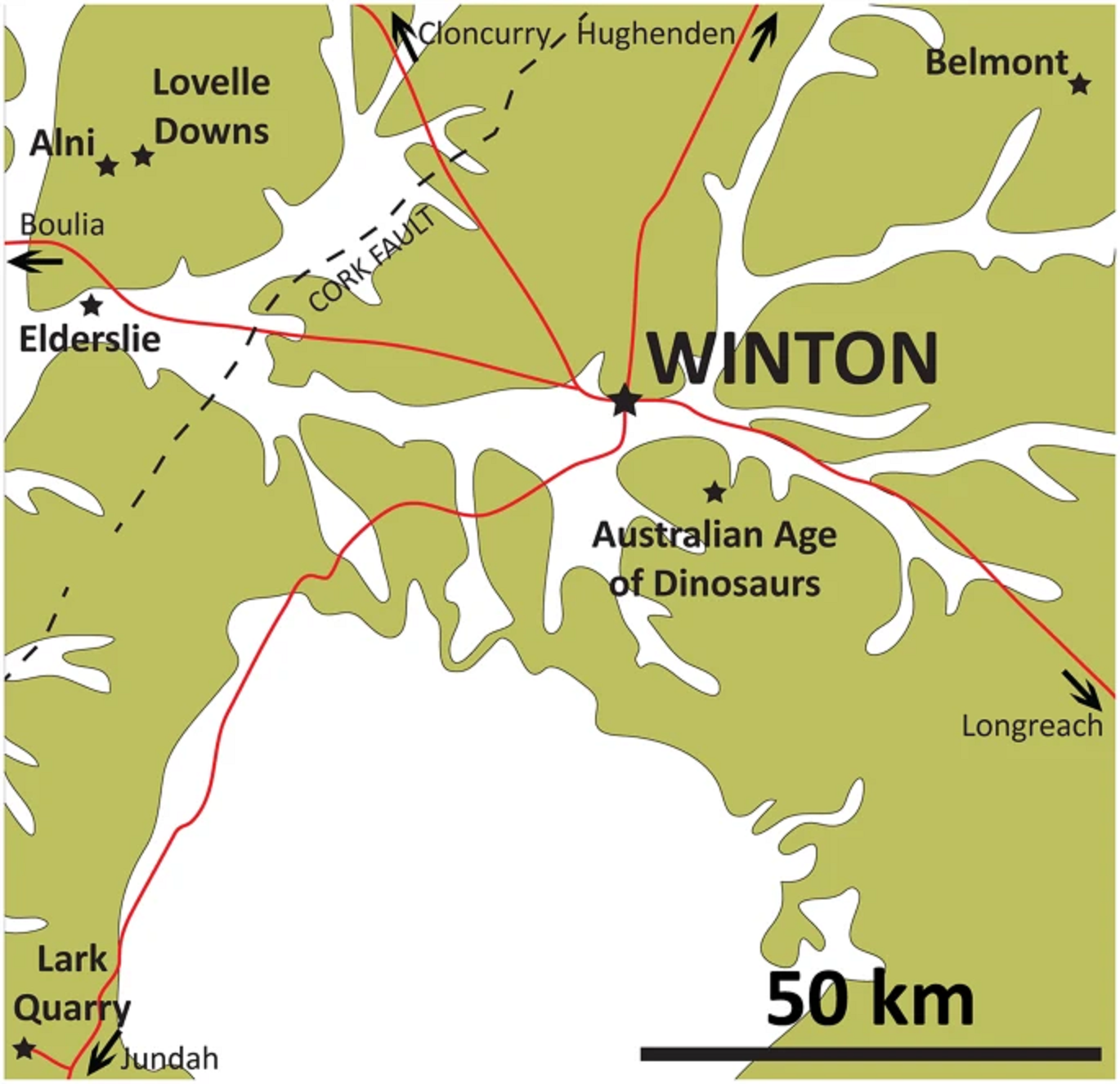
Map of the Belmont sheep station and outcrops of the Winton Formation (yellow-green) near Winton

In March 2005, the first specimen of Savannasaurus was discovered by David Elliot, founder of Australian Age of Dinosaurs (AODF), along with his wife Judy and their children. The specimen, now catalogued as AODF 660, was found on the Belmont sheep station, 60 kilometres (37 mi) northeast of Winton, Queensland; the site was given the number AODF 82, and is informally called the "Ho-Hum site". Excavations by the Queensland Museum and hundreds of volunteers unearthed the specimen in July and September of that year. A siltstone concretion containing the specimen was split along gypsum-filled fractures using jackhammers and chisels, with the pieces being marked to facilitate reassembly. Preparation of the specimen took around a decade, with air scribes and micro-jacks being used. Adhesives, such as superglue and araldite, were then used to put the pieces back together. The marks allowed the orientation of the specimen as it was found to be reconstructed, which informed a three-dimensional site map constructed with photogrammetry.

AODF 660 consists of around 40 bones: one cervical (neck), the third through tenth dorsal (trunk), at least four sacral (hip), and at least five caudal (tail) vertebrae; cervical and (fragmentary) dorsal ribs; portions of the shoulder girdle, including a fragmentary scapula, a left coracoid, and both sternal plates; parts of the forelimbs, including portions of both humeri, a fragmentary ulna, the left radius, and hand bones (the left first to fifth metacarpals, the right fourth metacarpal, and two phalanges); the fused hip bones, namely both the left and the right pubis and ischium; foot bones (the left astragalus and right third metatarsal); and other fragments. One of the foot bones was originally thought to have belonged to a theropod, while the metacarpals were initially also interpreted as having come from the opposite hands. The specimen is the most complete sauropod specimen known from Australia, and represents approximately 20% to 25% of the animal.

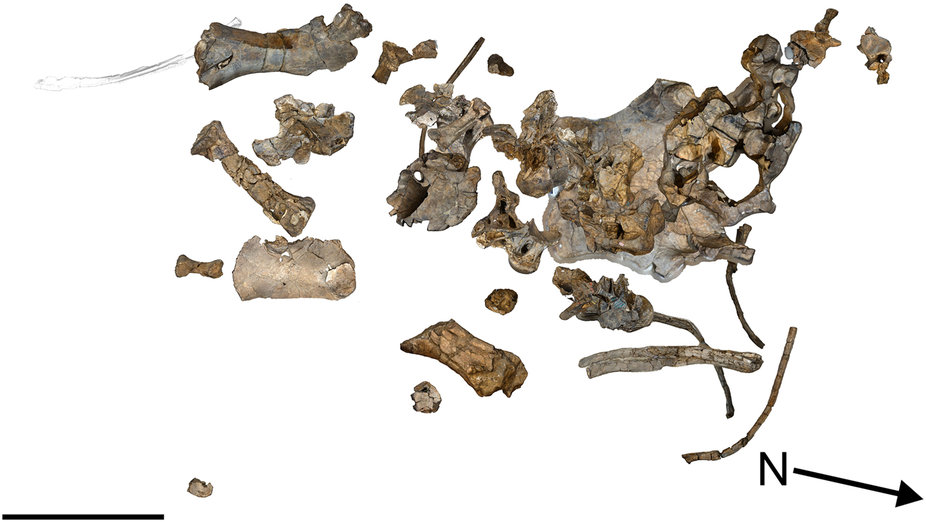
Orientation of the holotype specimen as it was found

The bones were preserved over an area of less than 20 m^{2} (220 sq ft). While the dorsal vertebrae were not articulated, they were preserved in sequence in front of the hip bones, allowing for their identification. The ribs on the left side appear to have been crushed prior to fossilization, before all of them were fragmented further. The fifth dorsal vertebra and both humeri show signs of being trampled by other dinosaurs before fossilization, which may also explain the scattered bones; however, the bones were less scattered than other dinosaur specimens from contemporary rocks. A third excavation in September 2006 discovered no additional remains, but a partial centrum from a caudal vertebra was found on the surface in 2013.

Having been nicknamed "Wade", AODF 660 was formally described and named in 2016 by Stephen Poropat and colleagues in a paper that also described a skull belonging to Diamantinasaurus. They identified AODF 660 as the holotype of a new genus and species, Savannasaurus elliottorum; the generic name of Savannasaurus, from Taíno zavana (the root of the word "savanna"), refers to the environment in which it was found, while the specific name elliottorum honours the Elliott family and their contributions to Australian palaeontology. The preliminary anatomical description of AODF 660 in this paper was supplemented in 2020 by another paper from many of the same authors, which provided a full description of its osteology.

== Description ==
Size comparison

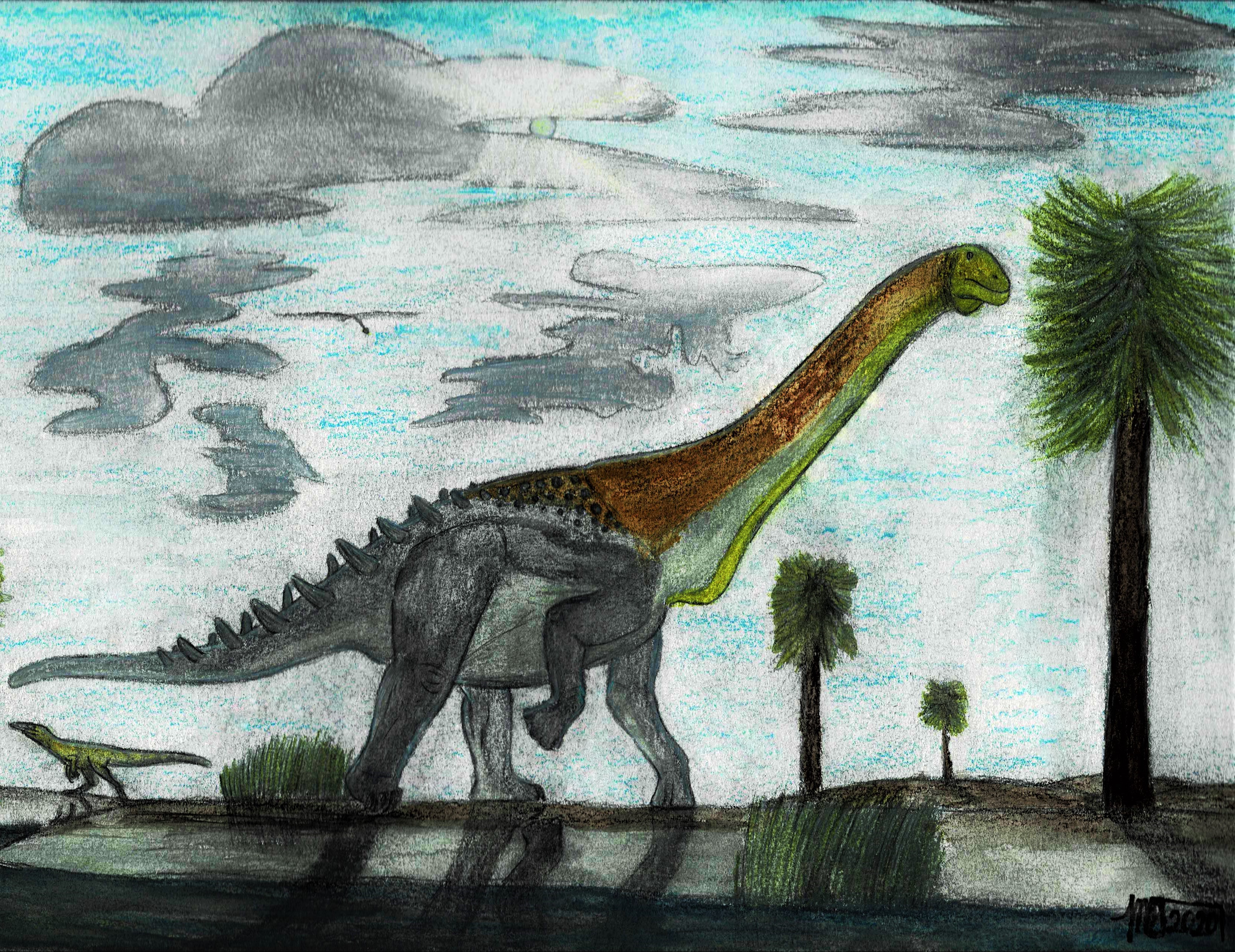
Life restoration of Savannasaurus in its environment

Savannasaurus was a medium-sized titanosaur that measured about 15 metres (49 ft) in length, with a weight of around 20 tonnes (22 short tons) and a shoulder height of around 3 metres (9.8 ft).

=== Vertebral column ===
As with most other members of the Titanosauriformes, the vertebrae of Savannasaurus were camellate, or pneumatized by small holes created by air sacs, and they lacked hyposphene-hypantrum articulations that allowed neighbouring vertebrae to interlock. The cervical and dorsal vertebrae of Savannasaurus were all opisthocoelous, or having a centrum (vertebral body) that is convex in front and concave behind. All other members of Eusauropoda have opisthocoelous cervicals, and all other members of Macronaria have opisthocoelous dorsals. Unusually, the front articulating surface of one of the caudal centra was undulating, being concave in the upper half and convex in the lower half. Poropat and colleagues suggested this as a distinguishing characteristic of Savannasaurus. The other caudals were amphicoelous, or having centra that are concave on both ends, which was also rare among titanosaurs save for Baotianmansaurus and Dongyangosaurus.

The only known cervical vertebra of Savannasaurus is considered to have come from the rear of the neck due to its proportions. Unlike most titanosaurs but similar to the "ancestral" (plesiomorphic) condition among sauropods, the vertebra had a subtle keel running longitudinally along its bottom surface; Mendozasaurus, Overosaurus, Austroposeidon, and Rapetosaurus also have such keels. There was a well-developed longitudinal fossa, or excavation, along the side of the vertebra that extends for nearly its entire length, unlike in many titanosaurs where it was faint or absent altogether. In contrast to more specialized titanosaurs like the Saltasauridae, the parapophysis (one of the rib articulations) was restricted to the front half of the centrum. Associated cervical rib fragments suggested that they were relatively long, extending for the length of at least three centra.

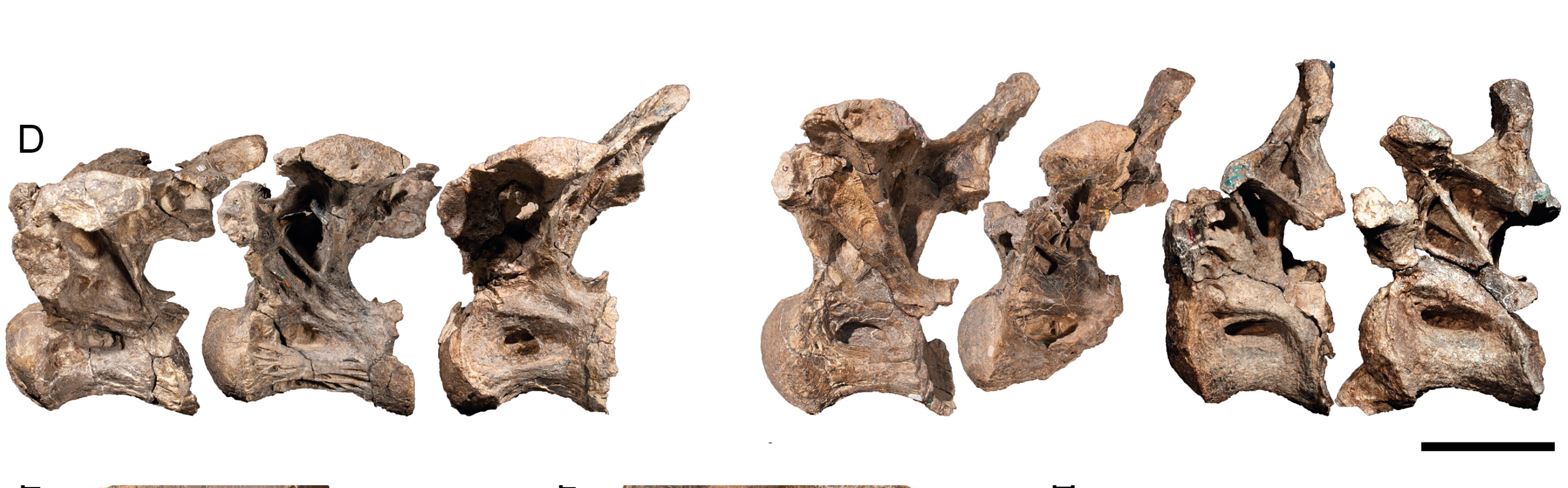
Dorsal vertebrae

Like many titanosaurs, the articulating surfaces of the dorsal centra in Savannasaurus were shorter vertically than they were wide. The dorsals have weakly-developed ridges bordering the sides of their bottom faces, as in Diamantinasaurus and Opisthocoelicaudia (where they were better developed), but Savannasaurus lacks the keel on the bottom of the centra as in these species. Like most other members of the Somphospondyli, the sides of the centra bore teardrop-shaped pneumatic holes. The articular processes at the front of the centra known as the prezygapophyses were connected by a sheet of bone (lamina), the transprezygapophyseal lamina; in the front dorsals, this sheet was V-shaped as in most titanosaurs, but it was basically flat in the rear dorsals unlike most other titanosaurs. Notably, the laminae in the dorsals of Savannasaurus were bilaterally asymmetric; the left side of the vertebrae would have been better reinforced by extra laminae. Also unlike Opisthocoelicaudia, the dorsal neural spines on top of the centra increased in height towards the rear dorsals, were not split into two, and were taller than their corresponding articular surfaces.

In addition to the undulating articulating surface in one of the front caudal centra (caudal "A"), the two front caudals (caudals "A" and "B") of Savannasaurus have another distinguishing characteristic. Like the non-titanosaur somphospondylan Padillasaurus, the front caudal centra had shallow pneumatic excavations on the sides surrounding small holes, whereas most members of the Somphospondyli have only the holes and not the excavations. This characteristic had previously been regarded as a distinguishing characteristic of the non-somphospondylan brachiosaurids. Two other caudal vertebrae (caudals "C" and "D") are known from further back in the tail. The centra of caudals B, C, and D were about the same length, suggesting that centrum length did not vary considerably. However, both articulating surfaces were wider than tall in caudal C, while the front one was taller than wide in caudal D, suggesting that it was further forward than caudal D. Like other titanosauriforms, the processes that enclose the neural canal—the pedicles—in caudals C and D were two-thirds the length of the centra, and were shifted forwards relative to the midline.

=== Shoulders and forelimbs ===
Two distinguishing characteristics of Savannasaurus are found in the sternal plates. First, they were D-shaped with straight outer margins when viewed from the bottom, instead of being kidney-shaped as in other titanosaurs. Second, they lacked the long ridges that were present on the bottom surfaces among most members of Neosauropoda. In general, the bottom surfaces were devoid of the grooves and pits on the top surfaces which are indicative of cartilage coverings. However, like most other titanosaurs, the sternal plates would have been at least 65% as long as the humeri (in Savannasaurus, the ratio was approximately 71%). The coracoid of Savannasaurus was oval-shaped in side view, unlike the characteristically quadrangular coracoids of saltasaurids, and the glenoid fossa on it (which articulated with the humerus) was much larger than that of Diamantinasaurus. Unlike most titanosauriforms save for Daxiatitan, Ligabuesaurus, and Sauroposeidon, the articulation with the scapula at the back of the bone was taller than the entire bone was long front to back.

Like Diamantinasaurus, Opisthocoelicaudia, and saltasaurids, the humerus of Savannasaurus was robust. The radius was twisted about its axis, with the long axes of the two ends being oriented in different planes, seen otherwise only in Huabeisaurus, Epachthosaurus, and Rapetosaurus. The maximum width of its top end (33% of the bone's length) and the presence of a strong ridge at the rear outer corner (the interosseous ridge) were more typical. Like all neosauropods, the hand digits of Savannasaurus were arranged like a horseshoe. Like Diamantinasaurus and Wintonotitan, the third metacarpals were the longest, followed by the second, first, fourth, and fifth. The third metacarpal was 49% the length of the radius, which was short for a titanosaur, but was at least 45% as in all macronarians. A distinguishing feature is that the bottom of the fourth metacarpal was hourglass-shaped, not trapezoidal or hexagonal. In life, the metacarpals would have been bound at the top and splayed at the bottom. The presence of phalanges is unusual; all titanosaurs but Savannasaurus and Diamantinasaurus had hands formed only by metacarpals. All digits but the first likely had phalanges, although their articulating surfaces on the bottoms of the metacarpals did not extend to the front as would be expected.

=== Pelvis and hindlimbs ===
The most distinctive feature of Savannasaurus was the width of its pelvis—its sacrum was 1.07 metres (3 ft 6 in) wide, and its fused ischium-pubis complex was at least 1.14 metres (3 ft 9 in) wide. Its sternal plates were around 85 centimetres (2 ft 9 in) wide to accommodate this. Although titanosaurs were wide-bodied in general, these proportions made Savannasaurus extremely wide-hipped, surpassed only by Opisthocoelicaudia and saltasaurines such as Neuquensaurus. Other pelvic proportions in Savannasaurus were also unusual. The ischium's articulation on the pubis was 56% as high as the bone was long, higher than most titanosaurs. The ischium in Savannasaurus was relatively short, being 63% as long as the pubis; it was at least 70% as long in all other titanosaurs but Rapetosaurus (54%) and Opisthocoelicaudia (64%). A characteristic that distinguished Savannasaurus from every other sauropod is that the front-to-back length of the ischium was only 42% of the bone's width. On the ischium, the iliac peduncle, one of the processes surrounding the acetabulum (hip joint), was only 32% of the bone's length, lower than most other sauropods. Furthermore, the front end of the ischium was 49% as wide as the bone was long; only Diamantinasaurus had a similarly high ratio (51%).

Another distinguishing characteristic of Savannasaurus is the presence of a subtle ridge that separates the front upper portion of the pubis from the rear plate. The ridge is parallel to another ridge just below the opening known as the obturator foramen; this latter ridge corresponds to multiple ridges in Diamantinasaurus. Also like Diamantinasaurus, there was an expanded "boot" at the tip of the pubis. On the ischium, the ridge at the back which separated it from the pubis extended further to the side than Diamantinasaurus, but less so than Wintonotitan. Further below, in the ankle, the height of the astragalus was greater than its diameters either front-to-back or side-to-side, which is unusual among titanosauriforms. Two unusually low ratios in the astragalus are distinguishing features: the side-to-side diameter was 87% of the height, and the side-to-side diameter was 98% of the front-to-back diameter. Unlike Diamantinasaurus, there was no shelf on the astragalus below where it would have articulated with the fibula.

== Classification ==
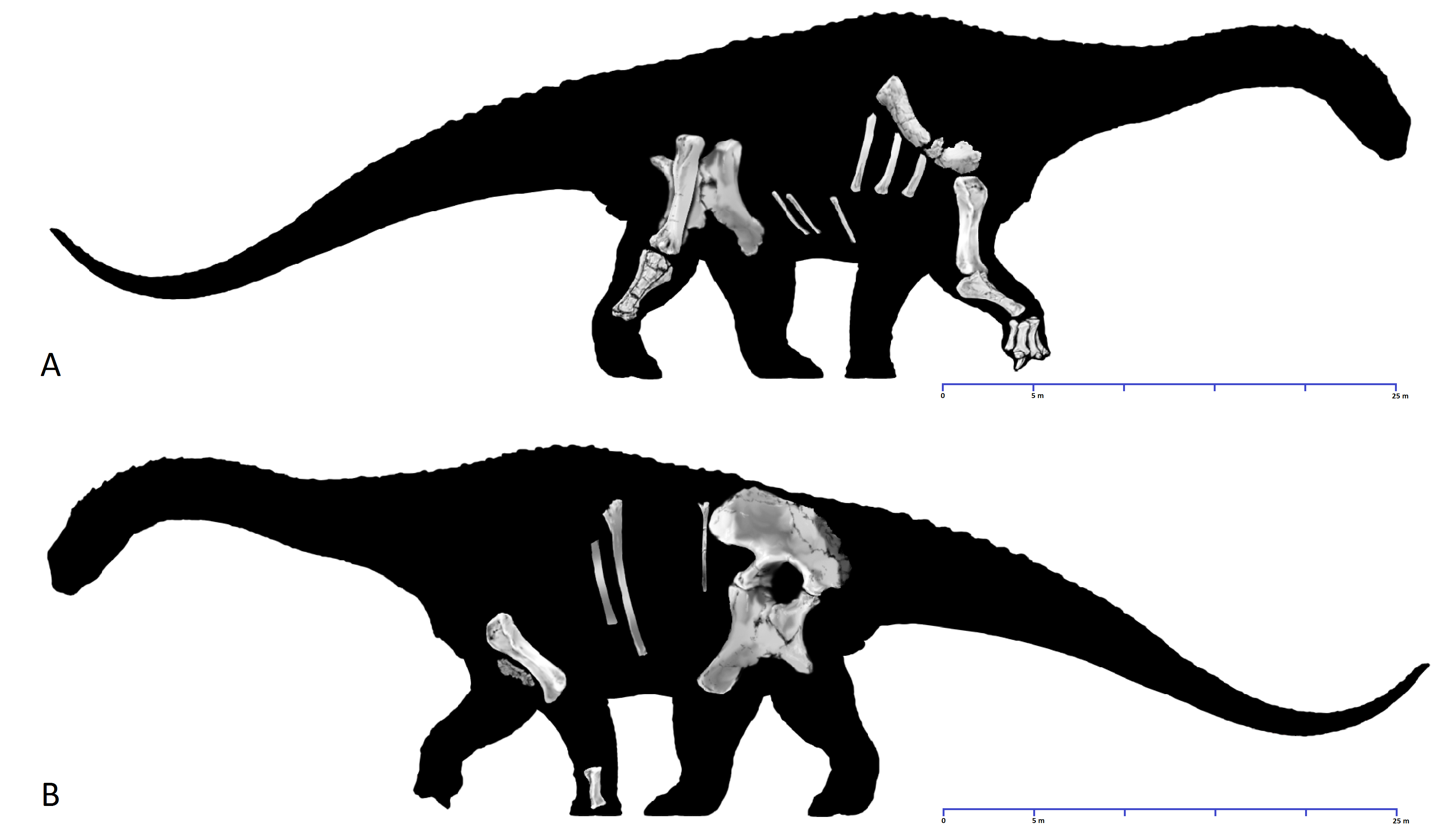
Skeletal reconstructions of Diamantinasaurus, a close relative and contemporary of Savannasaurus

For their 2016 description, Poropat and colleagues conducted a phylogenetic analysis to test the affinities of Savannasaurus and the new skull specimen of Diamantinasaurus. They added these specimens to a dataset created by Philip Mannion (one of the co-authors of the description of Savannasaurus) and colleagues for the 2013 redescription of Lusotitan. The analysis placed Savannasaurus and Diamantinasaurus together in a clade (unified group) close to the root of Titanosauria, outside the derived (specialized) group Lithostrotia. Similar results were recovered by Rafael Royo-Torres and colleagues in their 2017 description of Soriatitan; Mannion and colleagues in their 2017 description of Vouivria; Alexander Averianov and Vladimir Efimov in their 2018 description of Volgatitan; Bernardo Gonzàlez Riga and colleagues in their 2018 redescription of Mendozasaurus; and Pedro Mocho and colleagues in their 2019 descriptions of an indeterminate lithostrotian and Oceanotitan.

In 2020, Poropat and colleagues noted a number of features that support a position for Savannasaurus outside Lithostrotia: the horizontal transprezygapophyseal laminae, the lack of constriction in the vertebrae of the sacrum, the amphicoelous caudal centra, the pneumatic excavations on the front caudals, the D-shaped sternal plates, the presence of phalanges, and the lack of a longitudinal ridge on the side of the pubis. At the same time, the lack of hyposphene-hypantrum articulations in the dorsal and caudal vertebrae provides evidence against a more basal (non-specialized or rootward) position, given their presence in many non-titanosaur titanosauriforms and rarity among titanosaurs. Some titanosaurs also had these articulations; the basal Andesaurus and the lithostrotian Epachthosaurus had them in the dorsals, while the lithostrotians Epachthosaurus, Opisthocoelicaudia, Volgatitan, and Malawisaurus had them in the caudals. However, Poropat and colleagues recognized the possibility that they could have been acquired independently multiple times among titanosaurs.

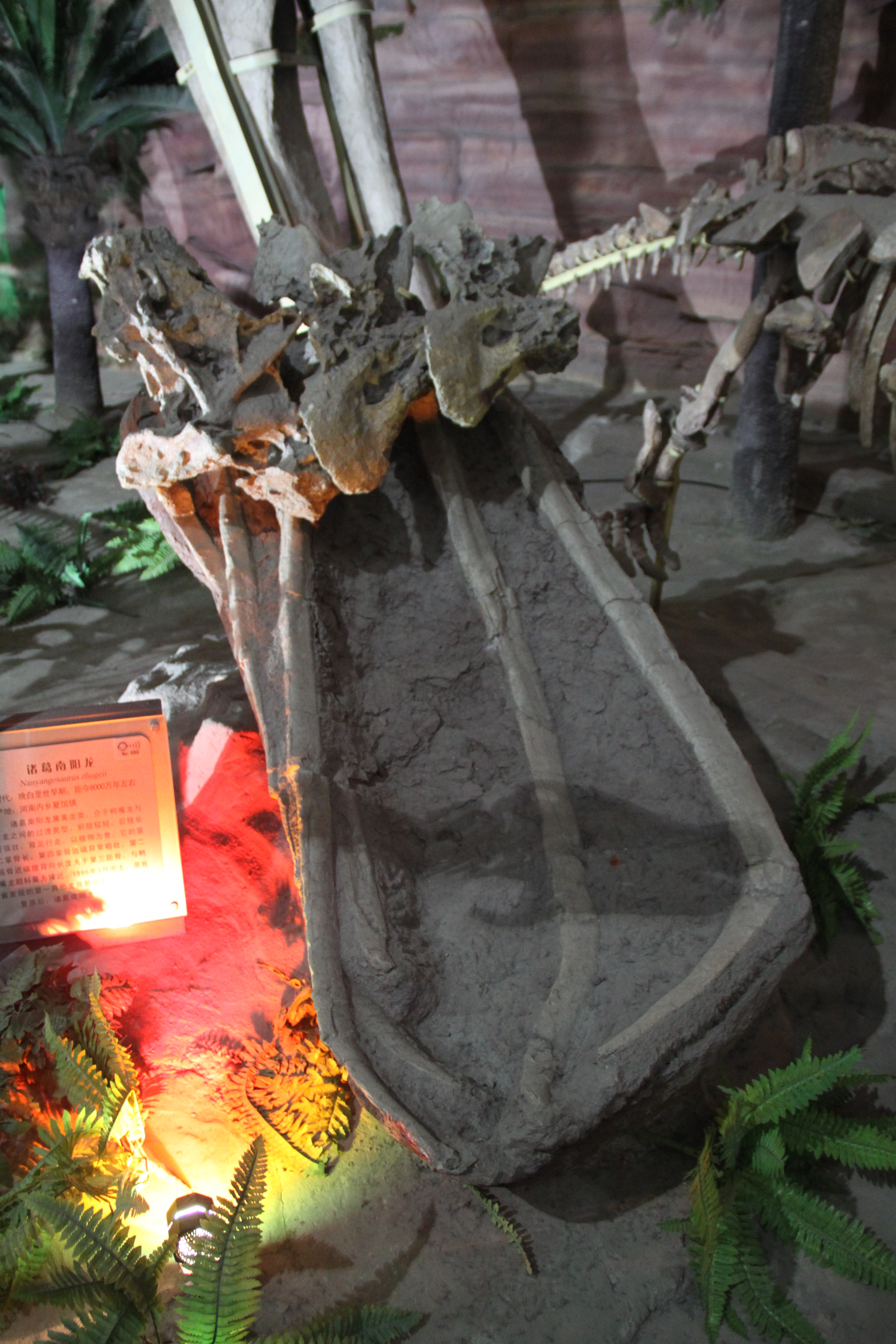
Dorsal vertebrae and ribs of Baotianmansaurus, found by some analyses as a close relative of Savannasaurus

Nevertheless, other phylogenetic analyses based on Mannion and colleagues' 2013 dataset have found different results. Royo-Torres and colleagues repeated their 2017 analysis after removing a titanosauriform from the Cloverly Formation, Chubutisaurus, and Angolatitan; they found instead that Savannasaurus and Diamantinasaurus were successively basal to a clade consisting of Baotianmansaurus and Dongyanosaurus. Savannasaurus shared amphicoelous caudal centra with both genera, various features of vertebral laminae with Baotianmansaurus, and unkeeled dorsal centra and the absent longitudinal ridge on the side of the pubis with Dongyanosaurus. However, unlike Savannasaurus, Baotianmansaurus had hyposphene-hypantrum articulations, and both genera had bifid dorsal neural spines (i.e., split into two).

Similarly, for a 2019 paper naming the new clade Colossosauria, Gonzàlez Riga and colleagues extended their 2018 phylogenetic analysis and found an unresolved polytomy of Savannasaurus, Baotianmansaurus, Dongyanosaurus, and a clade of more derived titanosaurs. Diamantinasaurus was placed in a more derived position as the sister group of Lithostrotia. Also in 2019, Julian Silva Jr. and colleagues extended the 2018 analysis of Gonzàlez Riga and colleagues for their redescription of Uberabatitan. They found Savannasaurus outside the Titanosauria in a polytomy with Euhelopus, Erketu, Qiaowanlong, a clade of Tangvayosaurus and Phuwiangosaurus, and more derived somphospondyls; they also found Diamantinasaurus and Baotianmansaurus to form a clade inside the Saltasauridae. Poropat and colleagues considered their results unusual in 2020. In their 2019 redescription of Jiangshanosaurus and Dongyanosaurus, Mannion and colleagues found both Savannasaurus and Diamantinasaurus inside Saltasauridae by equally weighting characteristics in their dataset, but using implied weighting eliminated this result.

The phylogenetic tree from the analysis of Poropat and colleagues in 2016 is reproduced below, at left, with emphasis on relevant clades. An alternative tree by Royo-Torres and colleagues in 2017, from the analysis that removed the Cloverly titanosauriform, Chubutisaurus, and Angolatitan, is also shown at right.

Topology A: Poropat et al. (2016)

- Titanosauriformes
  - Brachiosauridae
  - Somphospondyli
    - Euhelopodidae
    - - - Sauroposeidon
        - Paluxysaurus
      - - - Cloverly titanosauriform
          - - Ligabuesaurus
            - Dongbeititan
        - - - Tastavinsaurus
            - - Chubutisaurus
              - Angolatitan
          - - Wintonotitan
            - - Huanghetitan liujiaxiensis
              - - Huanghetitan ruyangensis
                - - Titanosauria
                    - Andesaurus
                    - - - Dongyangosaurus
                        - Baotianmansaurus
                      - - - Savannasaurus
                          - Diamantinasaurus
                        - - - Xianshanosaurus
                            - Daxiatitan
                          - Lithostrotia (incl. Saltasauridae)

Topology B: Royo-Torres et al. (2017)

- Titanosauriformes
  - Brachiosauridae
  - Somphospondyli
    - Euhelopodidae
    - - Sauroposeidon
      - Paluxysaurus
      - Wintonotitan
      - Padillasaurus
      - - Dongbeititan
        - Ligabuesaurus
        - Huanghetitan liujiaxiensis
        - Huanghetitan ruyangensis
        - Ruyangosaurus
        - - Titanosauria
            - Andesaurus
            - - - Savannasaurus
                - - Diamantinasaurus
                  - - Diamantinasaurus skull (AODF-836)
                    - - Dongyangosaurus
                      - Baotianmansaurus
              - - - Xianshanosaurus
                  - Daxiatitan
                - Lithostrotia (incl. Saltasauridae)

=== Palaeobiogeography ===
As the southern supercontinent of Gondwana broke up during the Cretaceous period, dinosaur faunas became more diverse. Conventional hypotheses suggest that the faunas from the Gondwanan continents (including Australia) would be closely related, but mid-Cretaceous Australian dinosaurs have been found to be more closely related to their Laurasian (northern) counterparts in spite of the fact that Laurasia and Gondwana had already been separated by the Tethys Ocean for a significant span of time. In 2016, Poropat and colleagues tested this hypothesis by performing a palaeobiogeographic analysis using the results of their phylogenetic analysis. Using the modern geography of the continents, they found that the ancestors of the Australian sauropods Savannasaurus, Diamantinasaurus, and Wintonotitan were likely Asian. Incorporating Cretaceous geography suggested ancestral ranges also spanning the Gondwanan continents of South America, Africa, and Indo-Madagascar.

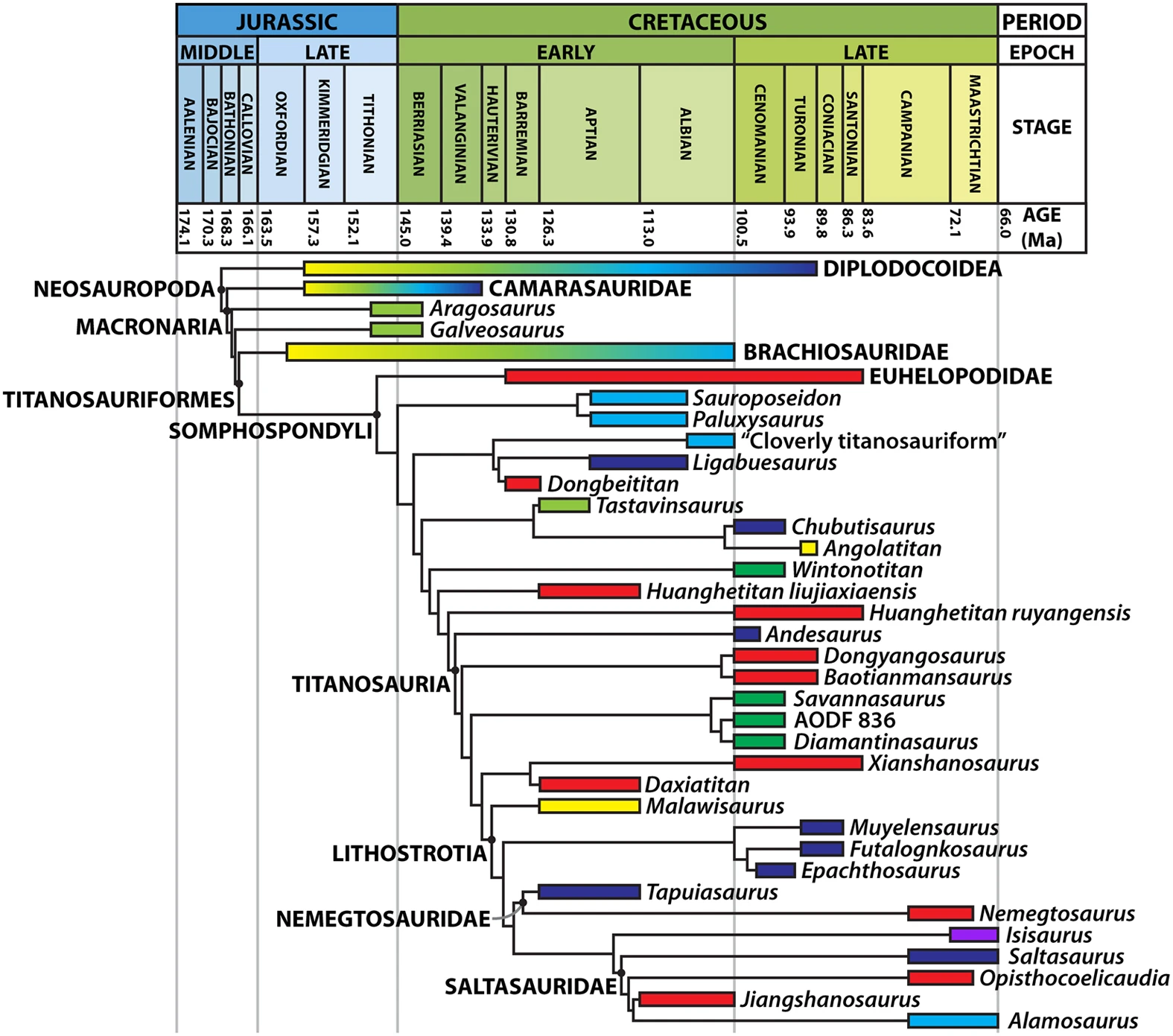
Time-calibrated phylogeny of Poropat and colleagues, colour-coded with the continents where genera lived (light blue = North America; light green = Europe; red = Asia; dark blue = South America; yellow = Africa; purple = India; dark green = Australia)

Combining their palaeobiogeographic analysis with time-calibrated phylogenies based on fossil age estimates, Poropat and colleagues inferred that somphospondylans and titanosaurs had attained a wide distribution across the world by the Barremian epoch, 131 to 125 million years ago, if not earlier. However, they ultimately diverged into a number of lineages ultimately with limited geographical ranges; they attributed this endemism to regional extinction events. They estimated that the Savannasaurus+Diamantinasaurus and Wintonotitan lineages had separately reached Australia no later than the late Albian epoch, 105 to 100 million years ago, but the exact timing depended on the models that they used. The oldest Australian titanosauriforms, Austrosaurus and the "Hughenden sauropod", date to this interval.

Although they acknowledged the possibility of sampling biases, Poropat and colleagues considered a late Albian dispersal likely because of the most probable dispersal route, which would have entailed beginning from South America and crossing through Antarctica to southeastern Australia. In the Aptian to early Albian epochs, this region of Australia would have been situated at a latitude of 70°S, with a cool, temperate climate. No sauropods have been found from these latitudes and environments, suggesting that they were adapted to warm climates and avoided these regions. Thus, they would likely have been unable to disperse across Antarctica until the late Albian, when global warming led to a smoother temperature gradient. Poropat and colleagues suggested that climate preferences could also explain the Laurasian affinities of Australian dinosaurs.

In 2020, Tai Kubo applied network analysis to a phylogenetic "supertree" of Australian dinosaurs. He found a strong connection between Australian dinosaur faunas and other Gondwanan dinosaurs, and identified Gondwanan Cretaceous dinosaurs as a distinct community. Thus, he suggested that most previous results identifying affinities between Australian and Laurasian dinosaurs were caused by insufficient sampling of Gondwanan dinosaurs and the phylogenetic instability of Australian dinosaurs. For instance, he pointed out that the megaraptoran Australovenator was thought to be an offshoot of an Asian lineage until more Gondwanan megaraptorans were found. While he suggested that the same was true of these sauropods, he also recognized the possibility that they had a different biogeographical history than smaller dinosaurs.

== Paleobiology ==
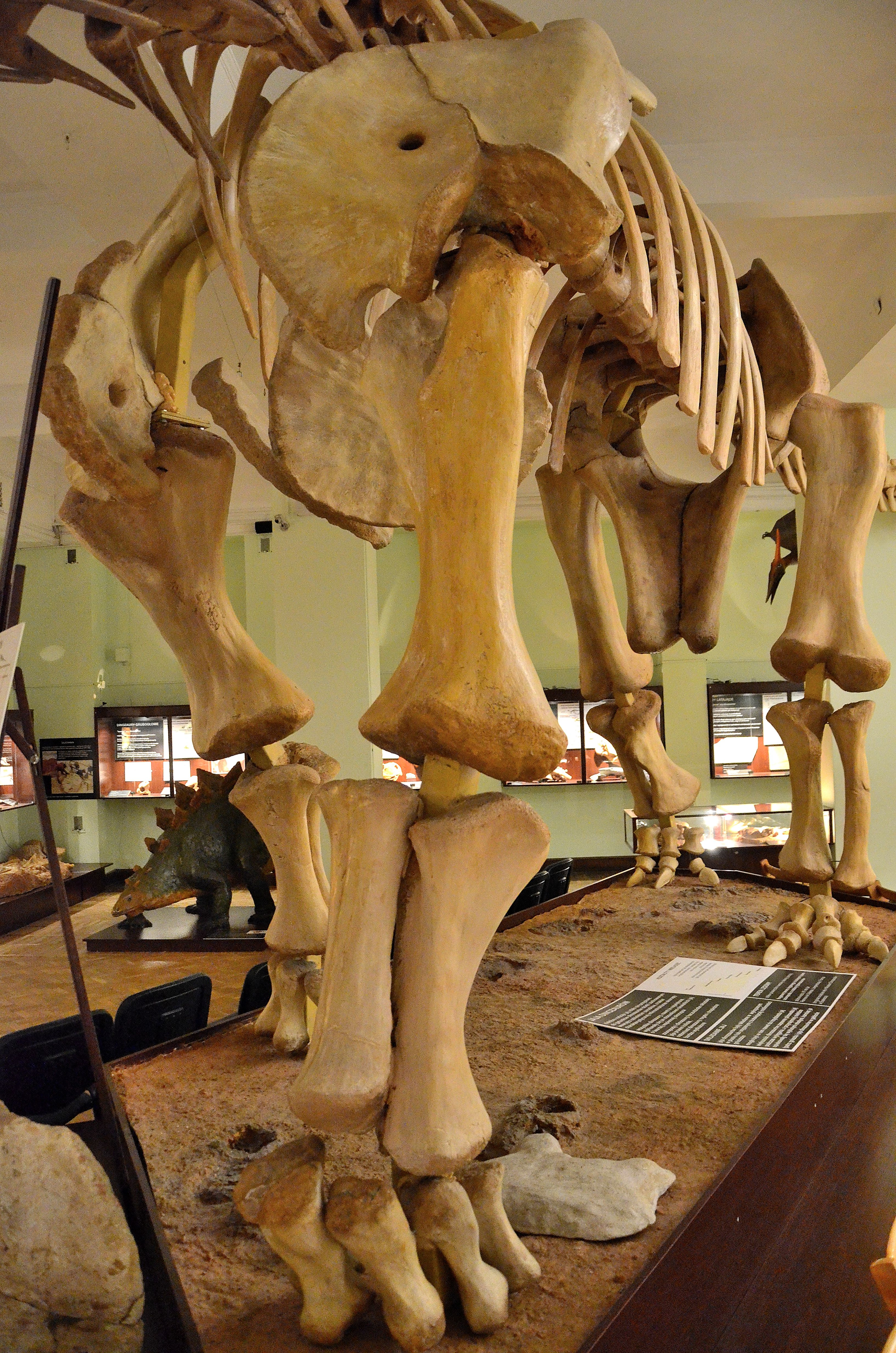
Skeleton of Opisthocoelicaudia from the front, showing the barrel-like body and wide-gauge stance that it shared with Savannasaurus

Like all titanosaurs, Savannasaurus was likely a "wide-gauge" sauropod, meaning that it would have stood and walked with its feet far apart from the midline. In 2020, Poropat and colleagues pointed to the width of its sternal plates and sacrum as evidence for a wide-gauge stance. The robust humerus of Savannasaurus was also considered a likely adaptation to a wide-gauge stance, which would have been convergently acquired with saltasaurines. They also suggested that the unusual form of the astragalus was also an adaptation to weight-bearing, but the absence of other hindlimb bones made this unclear. Yet, Poropat and colleagues also noted traits that would have increased the flexibility of the vertebral column, namely the absence of hyposphene-hypantrum articulations and the presence of prominent excavations (the centroprezygapophyseal fossae) below the transprezygapophyseal laminae. Both of these were shared with Diamantinasaurus, but were otherwise rare among sauropods.

Poropat and colleagues noted that both Savannasaurus and Diamantinasaurus would have lived on a floodplain with clay-rich soil and high rainfall (see § Palaeoecology), which would imply that the ground would occasionally become muddy and hazardous for large sauropods. They considered it possible that environmental pressures would have selected for individuals capable of navigating muddy ground, and that Savannasaurus might have spent more time near water than other sauropods. Flexible vertebrae (to escape bogs), barrel-like bodies similar to those of hippopotami, wide-gauge stance, and robust forelimbs (all to distribute its body weight) would all have been helpful for such a niche. They postulated that saltasaurines might have been subject to similar selective pressures, and so the "typical" titanosaur bodyplan may have been acquired convergently multiple times. While the same environment could also have selected for longer necks to provide easier access to water, Poropat and colleagues noted that Savannasaurus and Diamantinasaurus likely had relatively short necks, though overlapping cervical ribs might have improved stability in Savannasaurus.

== Palaeoenvironment ==
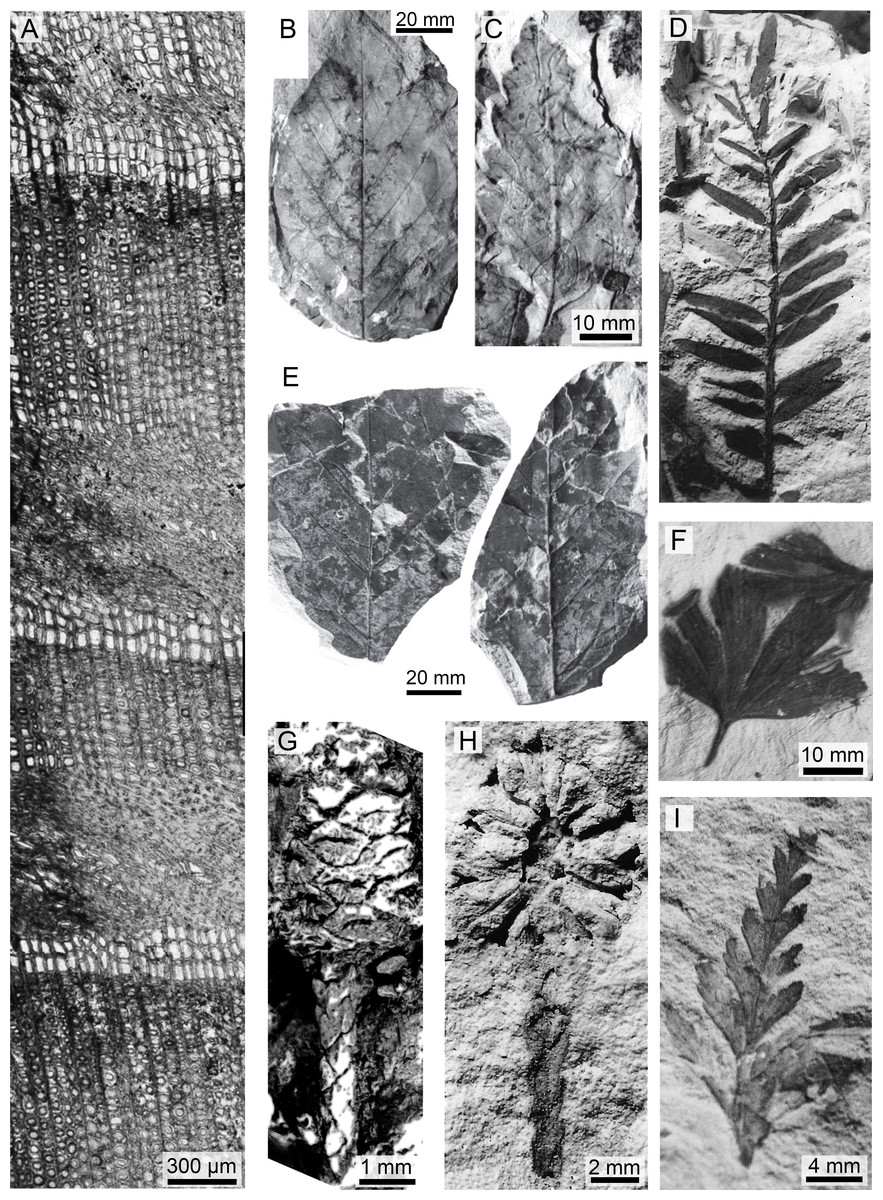
Selected plant fossils from the Winton Formation

The Belmont sheep station is part of the fossil-bearing rock units in the upper Winton Formation, which has been dated to around or just after the boundary between the Cenomanian and Turonian epochs of the Cretaceous—about 93.9 million years ago—based on uranium-lead dating of detrital zircons. It is the geologically youngest rock unit of the Mesozoic era in the Eromanga Basin. Six major facies, or distinct rock types, are found in the Winton Formation: two different types of sandstone-siltstone combinations (associated with meandering rivers, crevasse splays, and levees), mudstones (associated with oxbow lakes and ponds), sandy siltstones to silty mudstones (associated with tidal flats), plant-rich mudstone and coal (associated with swampy ground), intraformational conglomerates (associated with flooding). These rocks suggest that Savannasaurus lived on a freshwater floodplain covered in broad, meandering river channels with low-energy waterflow, which was subject to occasional flooding.

During the Cenomanian and Turonian, the Winton area had a latitude of around 50°S. Leaf fossils show that the climate was warm, with a mean annual temperature of 16 °C (61 °F), and wet, with a mean annual precipitation of over 1,300 millimetres (51 in). Although the weather was seasonal, there was no extreme cycle between the wet season and dry season as is the case today. The growing season would have been eight to nine months long. However, weather patterns also appeared to have been cyclical on a multi-year basis, similar to the modern Pacific decadal oscillation; this may also have influenced the sporadic flooding. Conifers and angiosperms were the most common plants in the Winton Formation; conifers included the cypress Austrosequoia, the araucarias Araucaria and Emwadea, and the podocarp Protophyllocladoxylon, while angiosperms included Lovellea and various unnamed forms. Other plants included the ferns Phyllopteroides and Tempskya; the liverwort Marchantites; the horsetail Equisetites; the bennettitaleans Otozamites and Ptilophyllum; and the ginkgoalean Ginkgo.

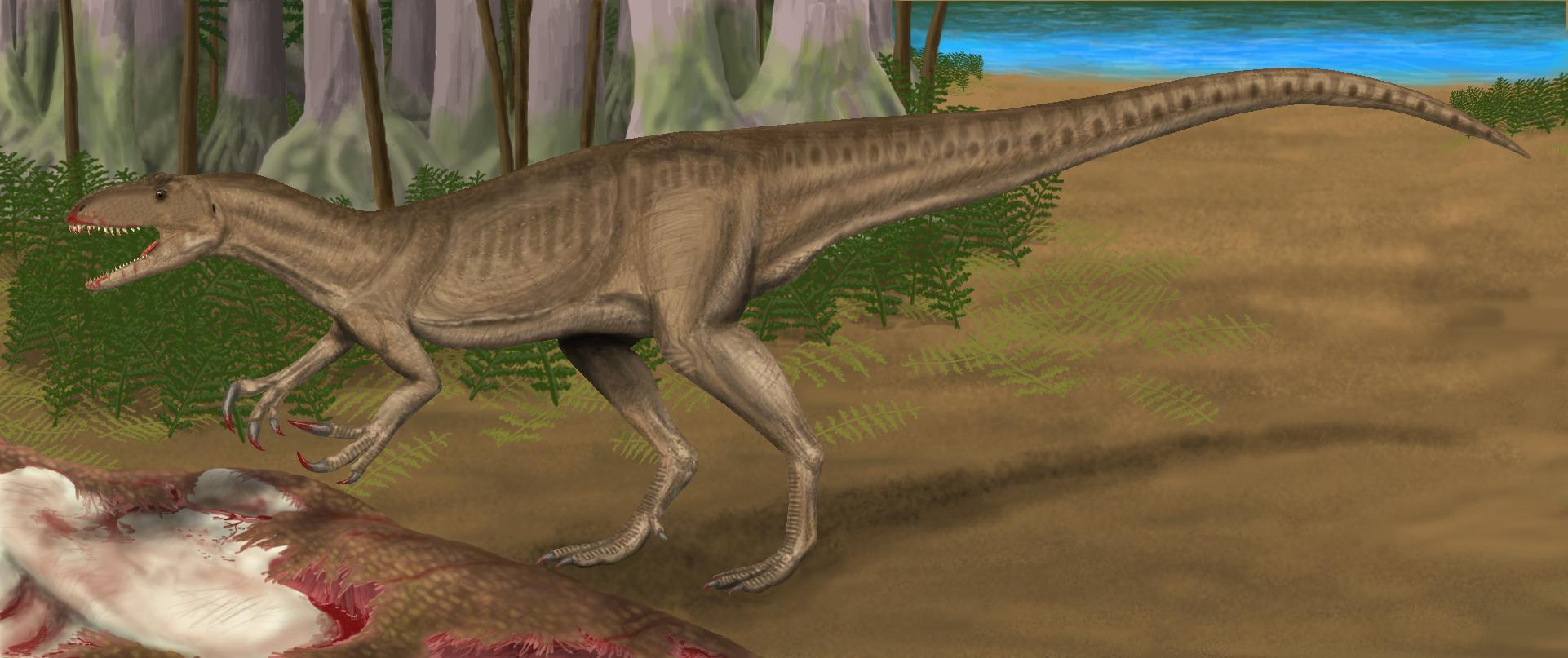
Australovenator fed on Savannasaurus and other sauropods

Savannasaurus lived alongside a diverse vertebrate fauna in the upper Winton Formation. Contemporary dinosaurs included the sauropods Diamantinasaurus matildae and Wintonotitan wattsi, the megaraptoran theropod Australovenator wintonensis, and indeterminate ankylosaurians and hypsilophodonts. A tooth belonging to Australovenator was found near the Savannasaurus holotype, suggesting that its feeding was responsible for the specimen's disarticulation. Other archosaurs included the pterosaur Ferrodraco lentoniT and the crocodilian Isisfordia duncani, along with other undescribed pterosaurs and crocodilians. Additional vertebrates known from the Winton Formation are chelid turtles; an indeterminate varanoid lizard; the lungfish Metaceratodus ellioti and M. wollastoni; and ray-finned fish including Cladocyclus geddesi. Invertebrates were dominated by the bivalves Alathyria jaqueti, Hyridella goondiwindiensis, Megalovirgus wintonensis, and Prohyria macmichaeli, but also included the gastropod Melanoides, dragonflies, scorpionflies, and oribatid mites known from trace fossils found in silicified wood.

== See also ==
- 2016 in paleontology
