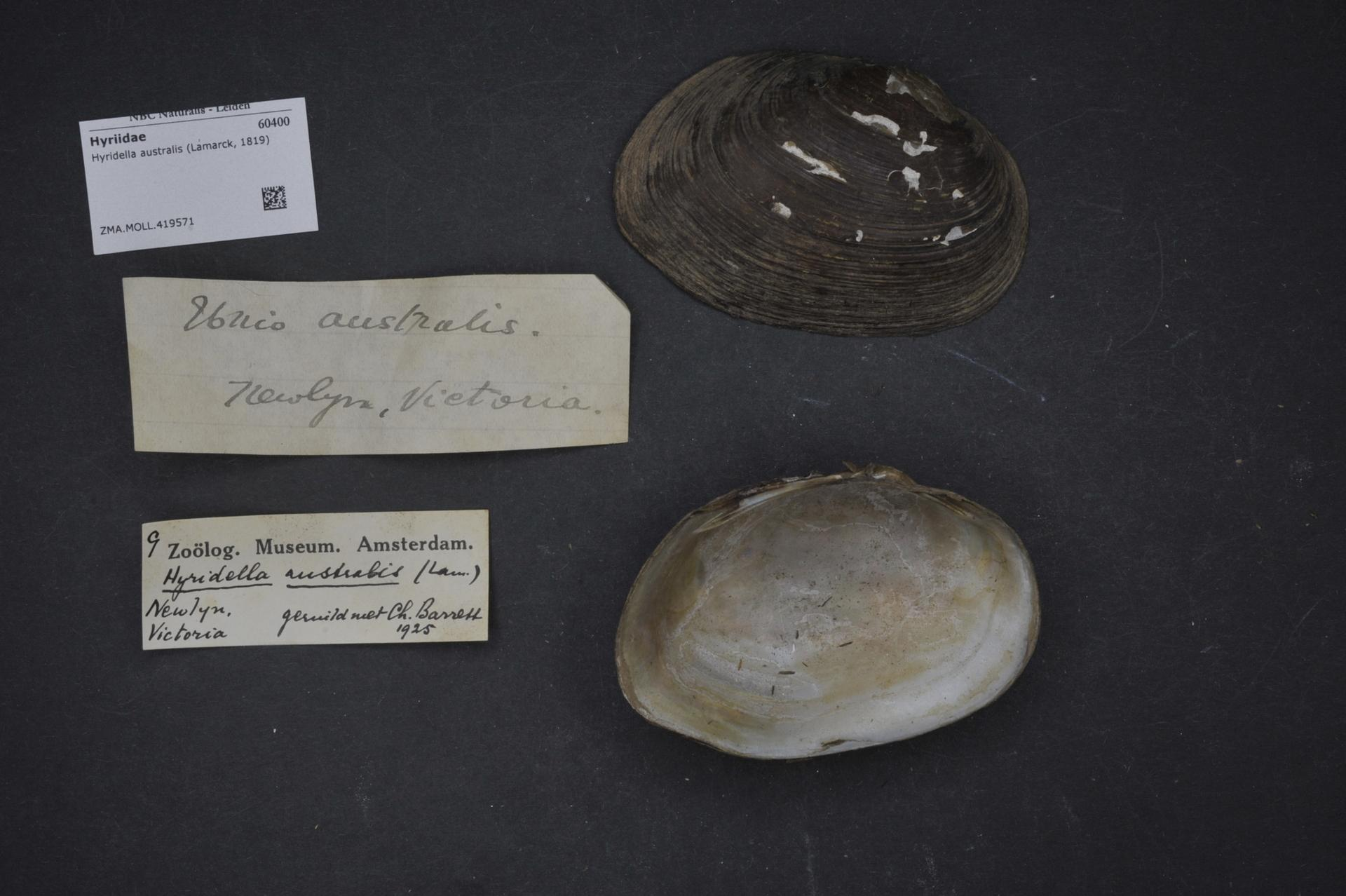
- Hyridella australis

Scientific classification
- Kingdom: Animalia
- Phylum: Mollusca
- Class: Bivalvia
- Order: Unionida
- Family: Hyriidae
- Genus: Hyridella; Swainson, 1840

= Hyridella =

Hyridella Temporal range: Cretaceous - Recent

Genus of bivalves

Hyridella is a genus of bivalves belonging to the family Hyriidae.

The species of this genus are found in Australia.

Species:

- Hyridella australis (Lamarck, 1819)
- Hyridella depressa (Lamarck, 1819)
- Hyridella drapeta (Iredale, 1934)
- Hyridella glenelgensis (Dennant, 1898)
- Hyridella guppyi (E.A.Smith, 1885)
- † Hyridella macmichaeli (Hocknull, 1997)
- Hyridella misoolensis (Schepman, 1897)
- Hyridella narracanensis (Cotton & Gabriel, 1932)
