= Scott Hocknull =

Australian paleontologist (born 1977)

Scott Hocknull (born 1977) is an Australian palaeontologist specialising in fossil vertebrates and Senior Curator in Geology at the Queensland Museum in Brisbane. He was the 2002 recipient of the Young Australian of the Year Award.

He is the youngest Australian to date to hold a museum curatorship and has described and named 10 new species and four new genera, including (in cooperation with the original finder Robyn Mackenzie) a giant Sauropod Australotitan cooperensis.

== Awards ==
- National and Queensland Career Achiever, 2002
- Queensland Science and Technology Achiever, 2002
- National Career Achiever, 2002
- Centenary Medalist, 2003
- Neville Stephens Medal, Geological Society of Australia, 2005
- Riversleigh Medal, 2009
- Rising Stars of Queensland Science, 2015
- 10 Best of the Best of Queensland's 50 Top Thinkers, 2015

Awards
Preceded by James Fitzpatrick	Young Australian of the Year; 2002	Succeeded by Lleyton Hewitt
