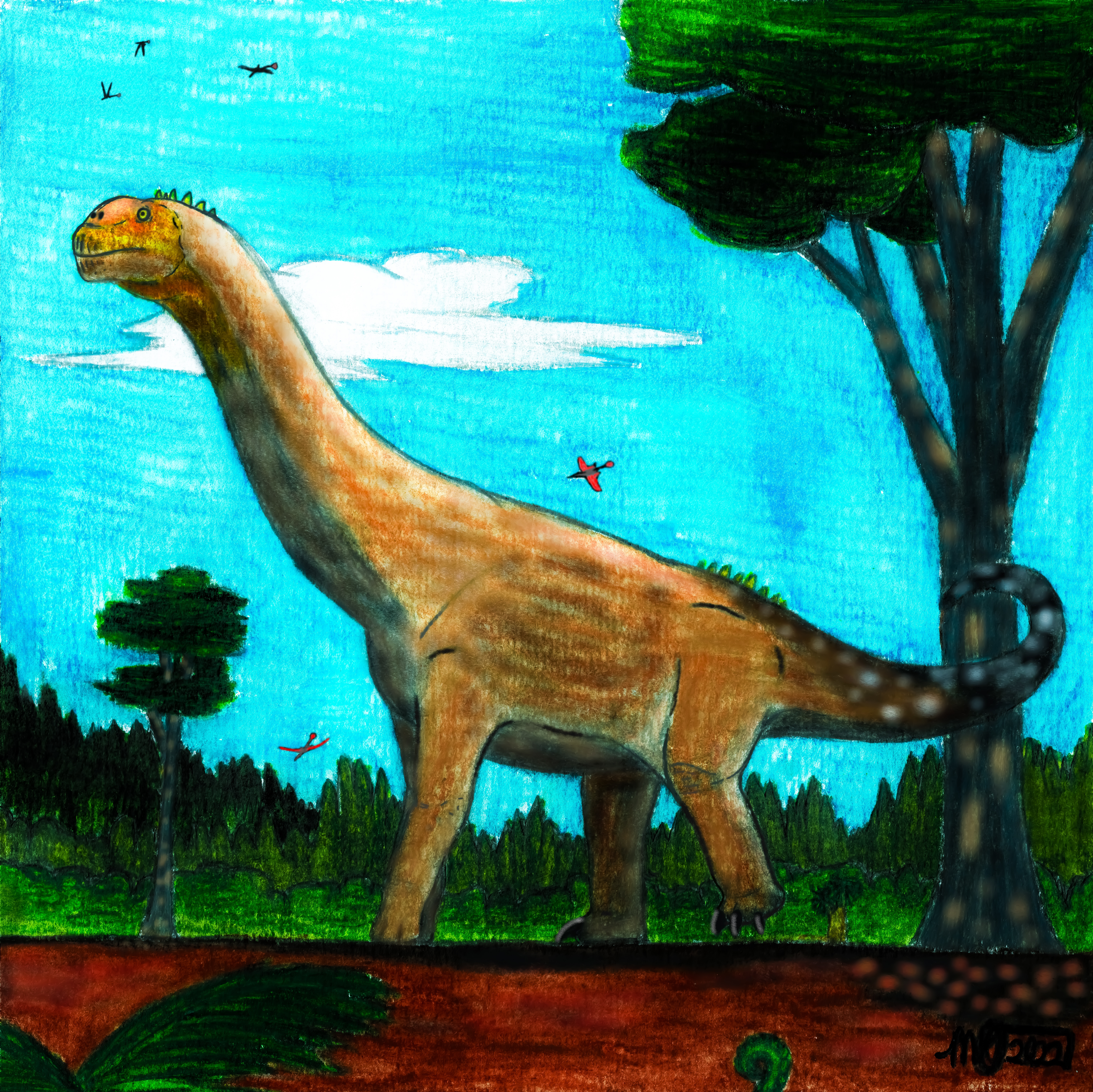
- Life restoration

Scientific classification
- Domain: Eukaryota
- Kingdom: Animalia
- Phylum: Chordata
- Clade: Dinosauria
- Clade: Saurischia
- Clade: †Sauropodomorpha
- Clade: †Sauropoda
- Clade: †Macronaria
- Genus: †Yuzhoulong; Dai et al., 2022

Type species
- †Yuzhoulong qurenensis Dai et al., 2022

= Yuzhoulong =

Yuzhoulong Temporal range: Middle Jurassic, ~Bathonian

Genus of macronarian sauropod dinosaurs

Yuzhoulong (meaning "Chongqing dragon", after Yuzhou, an early name for Chongqing) is a genus of macronarian sauropod dinosaur from the Middle Jurassic Shaximiao Formation of Chongqing, China. The type and only species is Yuzhoulong qurenensis.

== Discovery and naming ==
After the discovery of a new quarry from the Shaximiao Formation in 2016, the holotype of Yuzhoulong, CLGRP V00013, was discovered in Pu'an town in Yunyang County in Chongqing. It was named as a distinct genus and species by Dai et al. in 2022. The generic name, "Yuzhoulong", honors "Yuzhou", the ancient name of Chongqing, while the specific name, "qurenensis", is derived from Quren, the ancient name of Yunyang.

== Description ==
Yuzhoulong is only known from a partial skeleton, including a partial skull, of an immature subadult individual. It was partially buried in the rock at the time of its description, mixed in with the fossils of another, unnamed sauropod.

== Classification ==
In 2022, Dai et al. added Yuzhoulong to a number of different phylogenetic analyses, which consistently recovered as it a basal macronarian. This proves that macronarians existed by at least the Middle Jurassic, indicating a higher diversity of neosauropods in this age. The cladogram below displays the results of one of their phylogenetic analyses.

- Neosauropoda
  - Diplodocoidea
    - Flagellicaudata
    - Rebbachisauridae
  - Macronaria
    - Yuzhoulong
    - - Camarasaurus
      - - Bellusaurus
        - - Europasaurus
          - - - Euhelopus
              - Galvesaurus
            - - Tehuelchesaurus
              - - Tastavinsaurus
                - - Titanosauriformes
