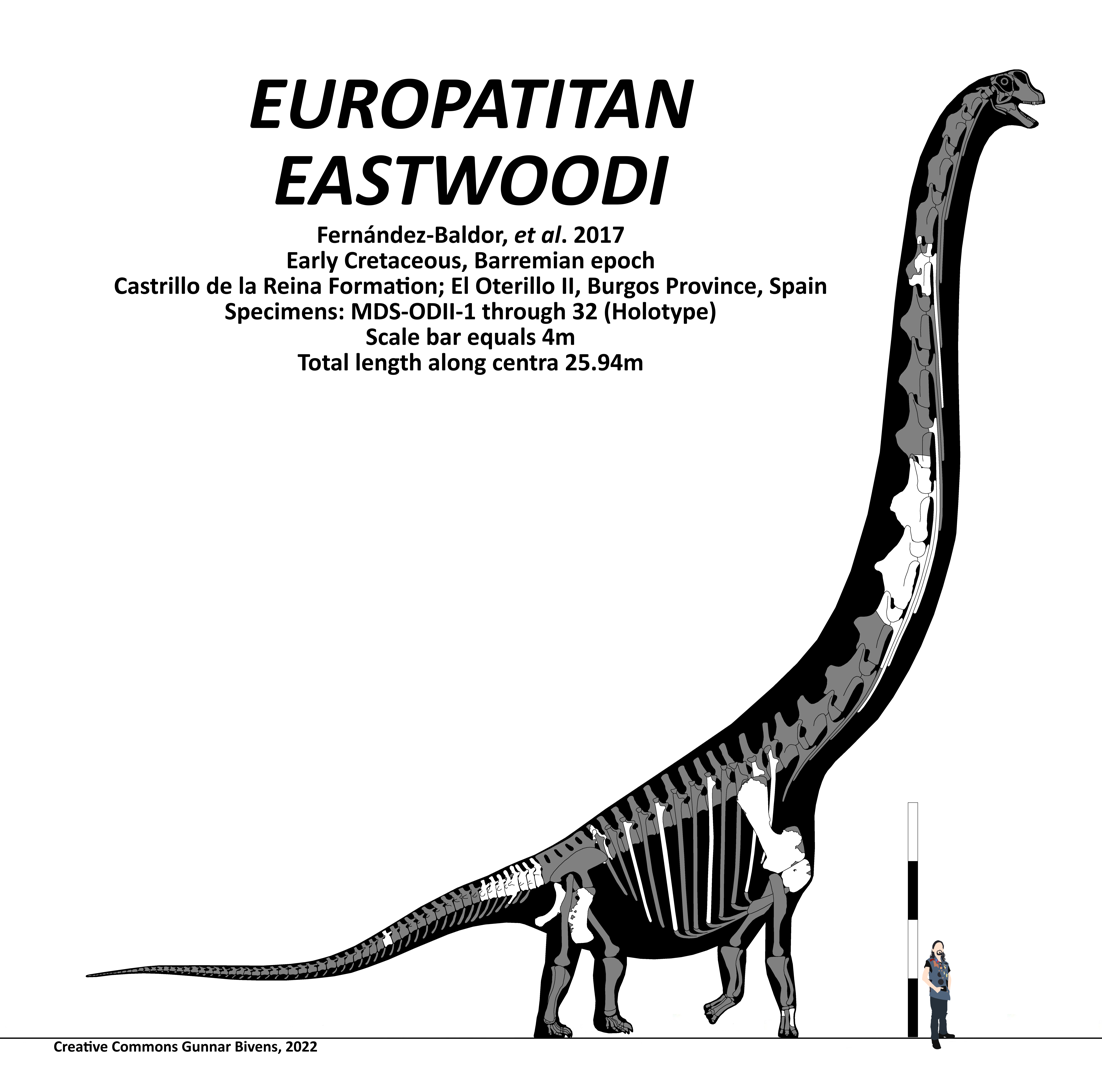
- Skeletal diagram of E. eastwoodi

Scientific classification
- Kingdom: Animalia
- Phylum: Chordata
- Class: Reptilia
- Clade: Dinosauria
- Clade: Saurischia
- Clade: †Sauropodomorpha
- Clade: †Sauropoda
- Clade: †Macronaria
- Clade: †Titanosauriformes
- Genus: †Europatitan; Fernández-Baldor et al, 2017

Type species
- †Europatitan eastwoodi Fernández-Baldor et al, 2017

= Europatitan =

Europatitan Temporal range: Early Cretaceous Late Barremian-Early Aptian, 124–120 Ma

Extinct genus of reptiles

Europatitan is an extinct genus of somphospondylan sauropod from the Early Cretaceous Castrillo de la Reina Formation of Iberia, known from a relatively complete specimen discovered in the early 2000s. It contains a single species: the type species, Europatitan eastwoodi.

== Discovery and naming ==
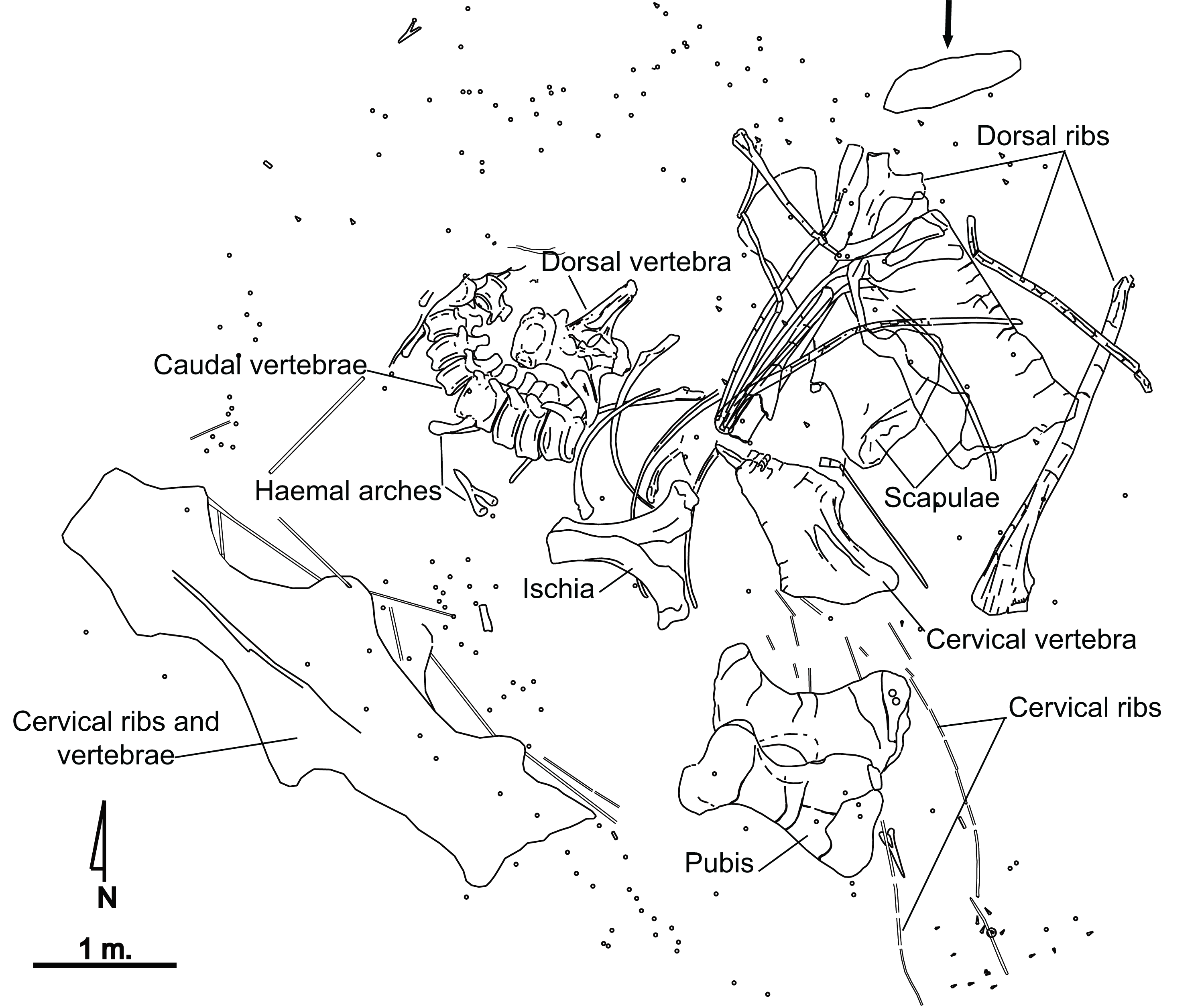
A diagram of where the bones of Europatitan were found when excavated

Sauropod remains were first found at a locality called El Oterillo II, which is part of the Castrillo de la Reina Formation in the province of Burgos in Spain in 2003. These remains would be excavated between 2004-2006. The fossils, although not initially described, were reported as those of a titanosauriform in 2009. They were given the designations MDS-OTII.1 to NDS-OTII.32 and have been stored at the Dinosaur Museum of Salas de los Infantes.

Finally, in 2017, the specimen received a full description by the authors Fidel Torcida Fernández-Baldor, José Ignacio Canudo, Pedro Huerta, Miguel Moreno-Azanza, and Diego Montero. All of the sauropod bones discovered at EL Oterillo II are believed to belong to a single individual and consist of numerous vertebrae and parts of the pectoral and pelvic girdles. The specimen was made the holotype of the new taxon Europatitan eastwoodi. The genus name roughly means "European giant (or titan)" and the species epithet is named in honor of actor and director Clint Eastwood, whose film The Good, the Bad and the Ugly was shot near Salas de los Infantes.

== Description ==
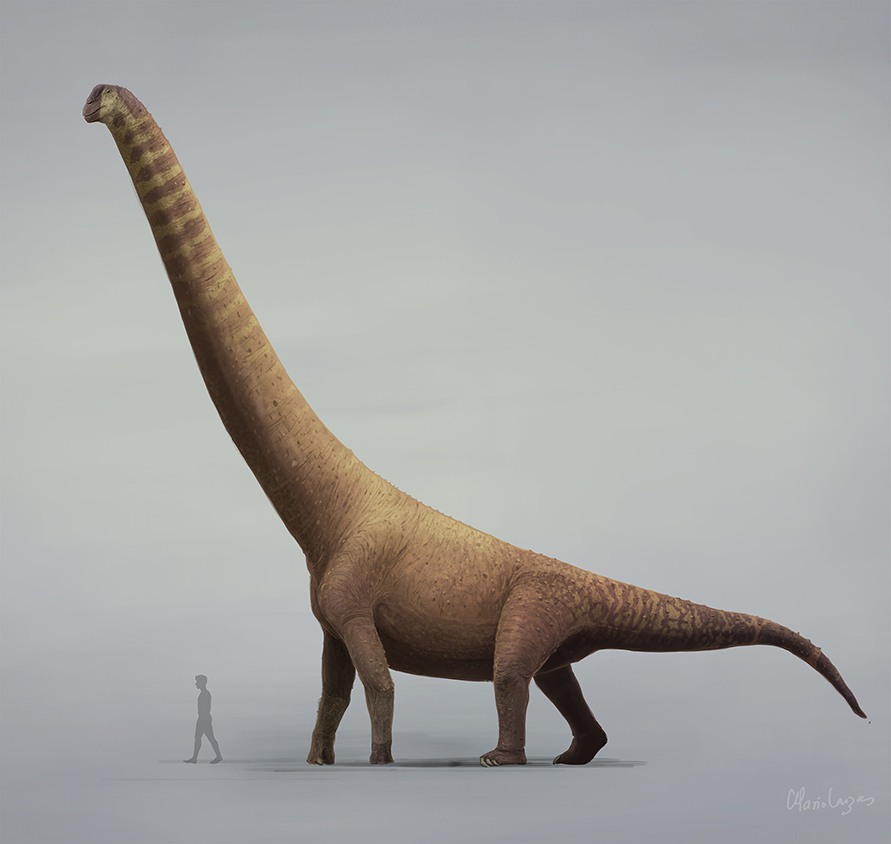
Life restoration of Europatitan next to a human silhouette for scale

Europatitan was a relatively large sauropod. In their description of its remains, Fernández-Baldor and colleagues did not give an estimate of its full size beyond remarking that it was "a large sauropod" and noting that it was larger than the contemporaneous Demandasaurus. Gregory S. Paul estimated its total size at 20 m (66 ft) long and weighing 25 tons. Rubén Molina-Pérez and Asier Larramendi gave a similar estimate of about 21.4 m (70 ft) long, 5 m (16 ft) tall at the shoulder, and 22 tons.

The type series, representing the only known individual of Europatitan, consists mostly of elements of the axial skeleton, with a few appendicular elements. Fernández-Baldor and colleagues listed the following elements as belonging to the holotype: five cervical vertebrae, one dorsal vertebra, nine caudal vertebrae, 11 cervical ribs, five dorsal ribs, seven chevrons, both scapulae, the left coracoid, two left metacarpals, both pubis bones, both ischia, and a single tooth.

Fernández-Baldor and colleagues were able to identify that Europatitan possessed a number of both autapomorphies (unique traits) and synapomorphies (unique combinations of traits). The autapomorphies include: a crest on the front surface of the dorsal ribs, two rugose surfaces on the deltoid crest of the scapula, triradiate laminae on the parapophysis of the cervical vertebrae, and numerous other features of the vertebrae. Synapomorphies of Europatitan include: a mostly flat underside of the cervical centra, pleurocoels of the cervical vertebrae that are relatively small, compressed dorsal centra, procoelous caudal vertebrae, a well-developed acromion process, a long canal on the chevrons, and a few other traits of the shoulder and hip bones.

== Classification ==
In their description of Europatitan, Fernández-Baldor and colleagues conducted a phylogenetic analysis using the dataset of Carballido and colleagues. This dataset was developed primarily to test the relationships of titanosauriform macronarians and included 75 taxa coded for 370 characters. Fernández-Baldor and colleagues also developed a modified dataset in an attempt to determine if the clade "Laurasiformes" (named a few years prior) was a true monophyletic clade.

The describers also performed analyses to determine if Europatitan formed a clade with the contemporaneous and closely related taxon Tastavinsaurus or the slightly older taxon Lusotitan. For the first analysis, they removed the most fragmentary taxa and presented the strict consensus tree with no additional constraints. The next two trees they provide constrain Europatitan to form a clade with either Tastavinsaurus or Lusotitan. Their results using both datasets did not give firm support for any of the three hypotheses to the exclusion of the others, which the authors attribute to the fragmentary nature of many Early Cretaceous titanosauriform taxa. Abbreviated versions of the cladograms they presented are shown below.

Reduced strict consensus, unconstrained

- Macronaria
  - Aragosaurus
  - Bellusaurus
  - Camarasaurus
  - - - Euhelopus
      - Galvesaurus
    - - Europasaurus
      - - Tehuelchesaurus
        - - Tastavinsaurus
          - Titanosauriformes
            - Europatitan
            - Brachiosauridae
            - Somphospondyli

Europatitan + Tastavinsaurus clade constrained

- Macronaria
  - Aragosaurus
  - Bellusaurus
  - Camarasaurus
  - - Lusotitan
    - - - Euhelopus
        - Galvesaurus
      - - Europasaurus
        - - Tehuelchesaurus
          - Titanosauriformes
            - - Europatitan
              - Tastavinsaurus
            - - Brachiosauridae
              - Somphospondyli

Europatitan + Lusotitan clade constrained

- Macronaria
  - - Bellusaurus
    - Camarasaurus
  - - Europasaurus
    - - Tehuelchesaurus
      - - Euhelopus
        - Titanosauriformes
          - Tendaguria
          - - Aragosaurus
            - - - Europatitan
                - Lusotitan
              - - Galvesaurus
                - Tastavinsaurus
          - Brachiosauridae
          - Somphospondyli

Subsequent analyses have found wildly varying results for the classification of Europatitan. It is generally agreed to be a member of Titanosauriformes, and is sometimes considered to be a member of Somphospondyli. The exact phylogenetic affinities of Europatitan, like many other titanosauriform sauropods, remains largely unresolved. However, a close relationship to Tastavinsaurus has been corroborated by other analyses.

== See also ==
- 2017 in archosaur paleontology
- List of sauropod species
- List of sauropodomorph type specimens
