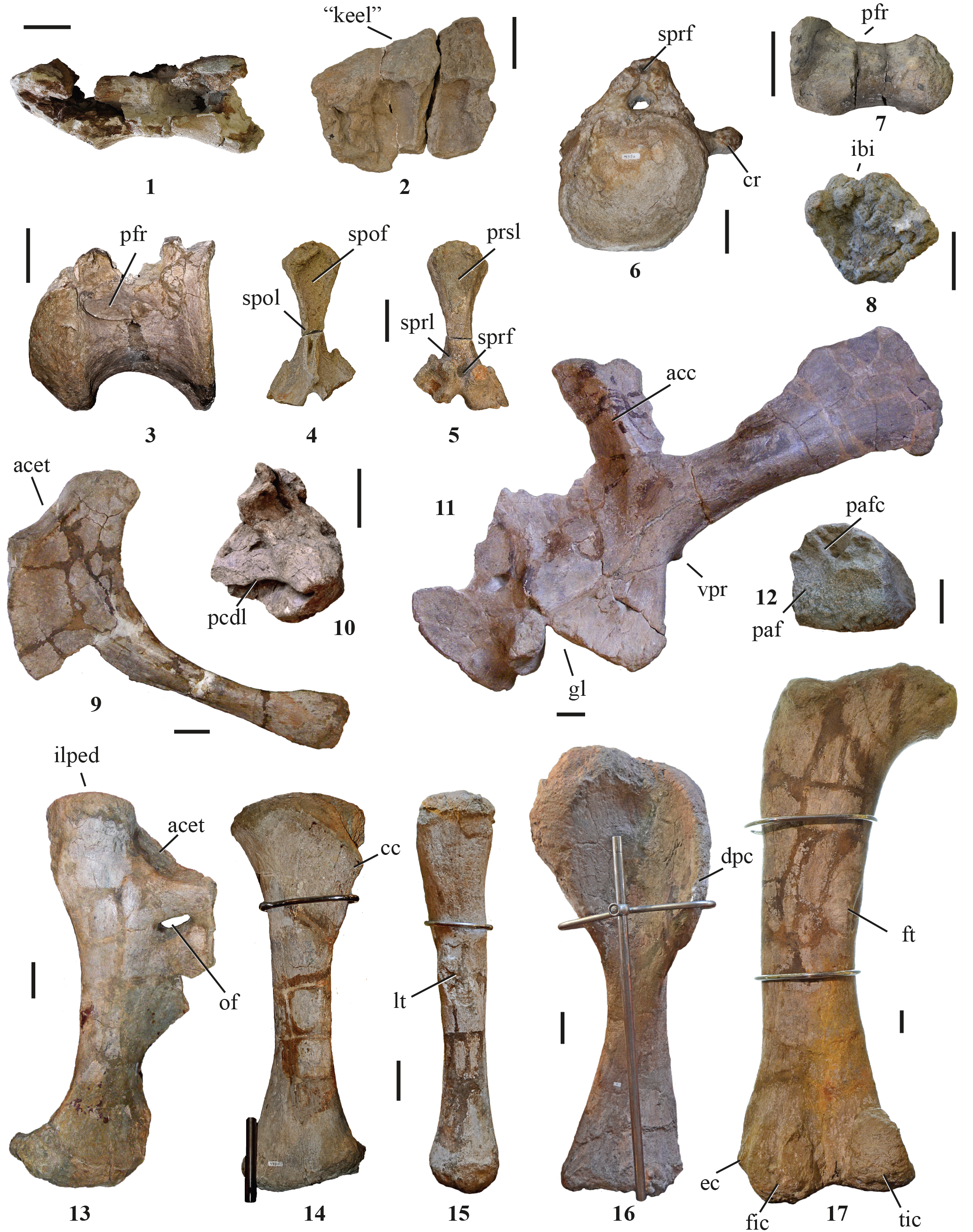
- Lectotype material of Lourinhasaurus

Scientific classification
- Kingdom: Animalia
- Phylum: Chordata
- Clade: Dinosauria
- Clade: Saurischia
- Clade: †Sauropodomorpha
- Clade: †Sauropoda
- Clade: †Macronaria
- Family: †Camarasauridae
- Genus: †Lourinhasaurus; Dantas et al., 1998
- Species: †L. alenquerensis

Binomial name
- †Lourinhasaurus alenquerensis (Lapparent & Zbyszewski, 1957)

Synonyms
- Apatosaurus alenquerensis Lapparent & Zbyszewski, 1957; Atlantosaurus alenquerensis (Lapparent & Zbyszewski, 1957) Steel, 1970; Brontosaurus alenquerensis (Lapparent & Zbyszewski, 1957) Olshevsky, 1978; Camarasaurus alenquerensis (Lapparent & Zbyszewski, 1957) McIntosh, 1990

= Lourinhasaurus =

Lourinhasaurus Temporal range: Late Jurassic (early Tithonian), 150 Ma

Genus of reptiles (fossil)

Lourinhasaurus is an extinct genus of herbivorous sauropod dinosaur dating from Late Jurassic strata of Estremadura, Portugal. The genus is monotypic, containing one species, Lourinhasaurus alenquerensis. The type specimen for this species was discovered near the town of Alenquer, near an abandoned mill. The specimen is housed at the Geological Museum of Lisbon. The research history of Lourinhasaurus is not without controversies, with referred specimens later being interpreted as not belonging to the genus (such as the type specimen of Supersaurus (=Dinheirosaurus) lourinhanensis). Lourinhasaurus means "lizard from Lourinhã" literally translated, despite the fact that the type specimen wasn't found in the Lourinhã municipality.

== Discovery ==
In June 1949 a partial skeleton of a large sauropod, found by American geologist Harold Weston Robbins, was excavated in a locality near Alenquer. The excavations at the locality, thereafter referred to as Moinho do Carmo quarry, were conducted by the geological Services of Portugal under the direction of Georges Zbyszewski. The locality lies within the Sobral Formation (a lateral equivalent to the Porto Novo and Praia Azul Members of the Lourinhã Formation), a sequence of rocks deposited in a estuarine delta complex context, dated from the early Tithonian. The specimen, which preserved more than 26 vertebrae, dorsal ribs and much of the appendicular skeleton (minus the hands and feet), probably represents a single individual and constitutes the most complete sauropod skeleton found in Portugal thus far. In 1957, Albert-Félix de Lapparent and Georges Zbyszewski published their work on the Portuguese vertebrate fauna, "Les dinosauriens du Portugal", wherein they erected a new Apatosaurus species, Apatosaurus alenquerensis, based on the Moinho do Carmo specimen, as well as well as on a caudal vertebrae series found at S. Bernardino (Peniche), and other fragmentary specimens. The specific name alenquerensis refers to the locality of Alenquer.

In 1983, another partial skeleton of a sauropod dinosaur was discovered at the Porto Dinheiro (Lourinhã). The skeleton was excavated in 1987, 1991 and 1992 by members of the Lourinhã Museum, the National Museum of Natural History and Science, Lisbon and the University of Salamanca. It was discovered in layers of the Praia da Amoreira-Porto Novo Member of the Lourinhã Formation, dated from the late Kimmeridgian, and therefore slightly older than the Moinho do Carmo specimen.The skeleton is composed of nine neural spines, 12 complete posterior cervical and dorsal vertebrae, 12 dorsal ribs from both sides of the animal and other fragmentary material from the appendicular skeleton. Furthermore, one tooth and gastroliths were found in association with the specimen. In 1998, Pedro Dantas and colleagues publish their work on the Porto Dinheiro specimen, that they interpreted as being the same species as the Moinho do Carmo specimen. They proposed the combinatio nova Lourinhasaurus alenquerensis, and emended the diagnosis for the taxon, although mostly based on the Porto Dinheiro specimen. They did not appoint a type specimen. The new generic name refers to the locality of the Porto Dinheiro specimen, which lies within the Lourinhã municipality. Just a year later, however, the Porto Dinheiro specimen was reinterpreted as a diplodocid, and given the new name Dinheirosaurus lourinhanensis. The authors of this work still suggested the Moinho do Carmo specimen represented a new species

It was not until 2003 that the Moinho do Carmo specimen was appointed as the lectotype for Lourinhasaurus alenquerensis. In 2014, Mocho and colleagues published a complete re-description of the Moinho do Carmo specimen, including elements never described before, and also provided a phylogenetic revision of Lourinhasaurus. They recovered Lourinhasaurus alenquerensis as a valid genus, closely related to Camarasaurus, a sauropod genus from the Late Jurassic Morrisson Formation. The other partial specimens that Albert-Félix de Lapparent and Georges Zbyszewski referred to Apatosaurus alenquerensis, such as the caudal vertebrae series from São Bernardino, are no longer attributed to Lourinhasaurus alenquerensis, instead being considered indeterminate remains.

== Description ==
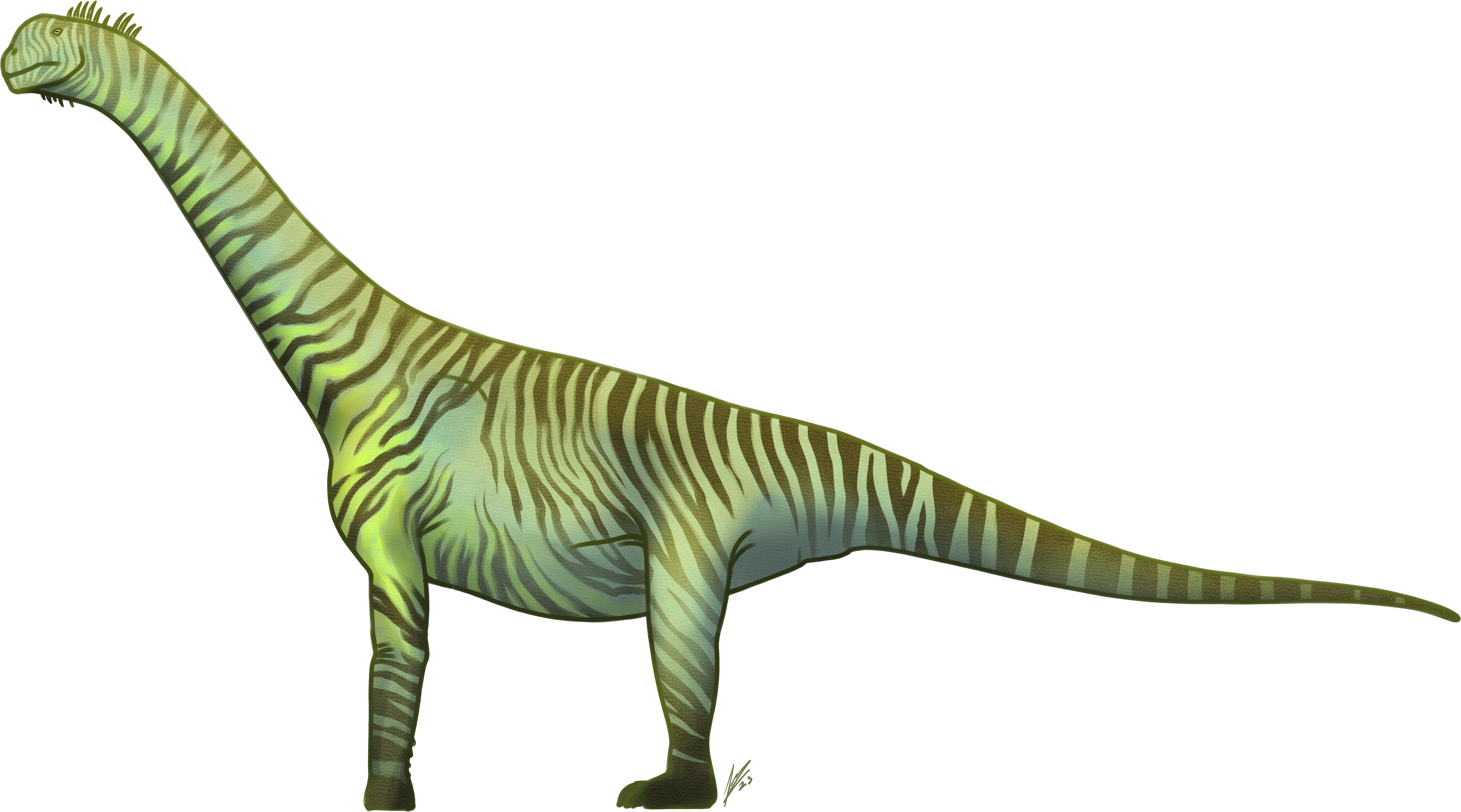
Life reconstruction

Lourinhasaurus alenquerensis is a large herbivorous dinosaur, closely related to Camarasaurus. It possesses some notable features in its skeleton, such as a ventral concavity in the anterior-to-middle dorsal vertebrae, very tall sacral neural spines, a posteriorly-oriented postacetabular process of the ilium, tibiae and fibulae of equal length, and a marked lateral deflection of the femoral shaft (without the lateral bulge commonly seen in titanosaurs), among others. The higher humerus/femur length ratio of Lourinhasaurus, as pointed out by John Stanton McIntosh, might have suggested a slightly more verticalized posture compared to Camarasaurus. Lourinhasaurus alenquerensis has been estimated at 15–18 metres (49–59 ft) in length and weighed around 5 metric tons (5.5 short tons). The femur of Lourinhasaurus is estimated at 1.68 metres (5.5 ft) in length.

== Classification ==
Upon its original description, the Moinho do Carmo specimen was considered a species of Apatosaurus. The attribution of this species to Apatosaurus was subsequently questioned. In 1970 Rodney Steel renamed it Atlantosaurus alenquerensis, and in 1978 George Olshevsky coined proposed the name Brontosaurus alenquerensis. Notably, John Stanton McIntosh in 1990 proposed for the first time that the Moinho do Carmo specimen represented a new species with close affinity to Camarasaurus. He published a new taxonomic framework for the skeleton, basing his assertion on the opisthocoelic dorsal vertebrae, the broadly expanded distal scapular blade, the long and slender humerus, and the unexpanded distal ends of the ischia that the specimen shares with Camarasaurus. The authors proposed Camarasaurus alenquerensis as a provisory assignation for the specimen. McIntosh later suggested the possibility that the skeleton might represent its own genus, based on the higher humerus/femur length ratio compared to Camarasaurus. In the following years, Lourinhasaurus had been considered a basal eusauropod, a non-macronarian neosauropod, a basal macronarian, and even a form related to Laurasiaformes.

It wasn't until 2014, with the full re-description of the specimen published by Mocho and colleagues, that the phylogenetic relationships of the specimen were cleared out. The phylogenetic hypotheses proposed by that work suggest that Lourinhasaurus is a basal member of the Macronaria closely related to Camarasaurus, in agreement with McIntosh's earlier views. This study recovered, for the first time in a cladistic analysis, Camarasauridae as a monophyletic clade, including Camarasaurus, Lourinhasaurus and Tehuelchesaurus.

- Neosauropoda
  - Jobaria tiguidensis
  - Haplocanthosaurus
  - Diplodocoidea
    - Rebbachisauridae
      - Rebbachisaurus garasbae
      - Limaysaurus
      - Nigersaurus taqueti
    - Flagellicaudata
      - Dicraeosauridae
        - Amargasaurus cazaui
        - Dicraeosaurus
      - Diplodocidae
        - Apatosaurus
        - - Diplodocus
          - Barosaurus lentus
  - Macronaria
    - Camarasauridae
      - Tehuelchesaurus benitezii
      - Lourinhasaurus alenquerensis
      - Camarasaurus
    - Titanosauriformes
      - Giraffatitan brancai
      - - Phuwiangosaurus sirindhornae
        - Euhelopus zdanskyi
        - - Venenosaurus dicrocei
          - Cedarosaurus weiskopfae
          - Tastavinsaurus sanzi
        - Titanosauria

Mocho et al. 2014 strict consensus cladogram obtained from Wilson’s (2002) data matrix.
