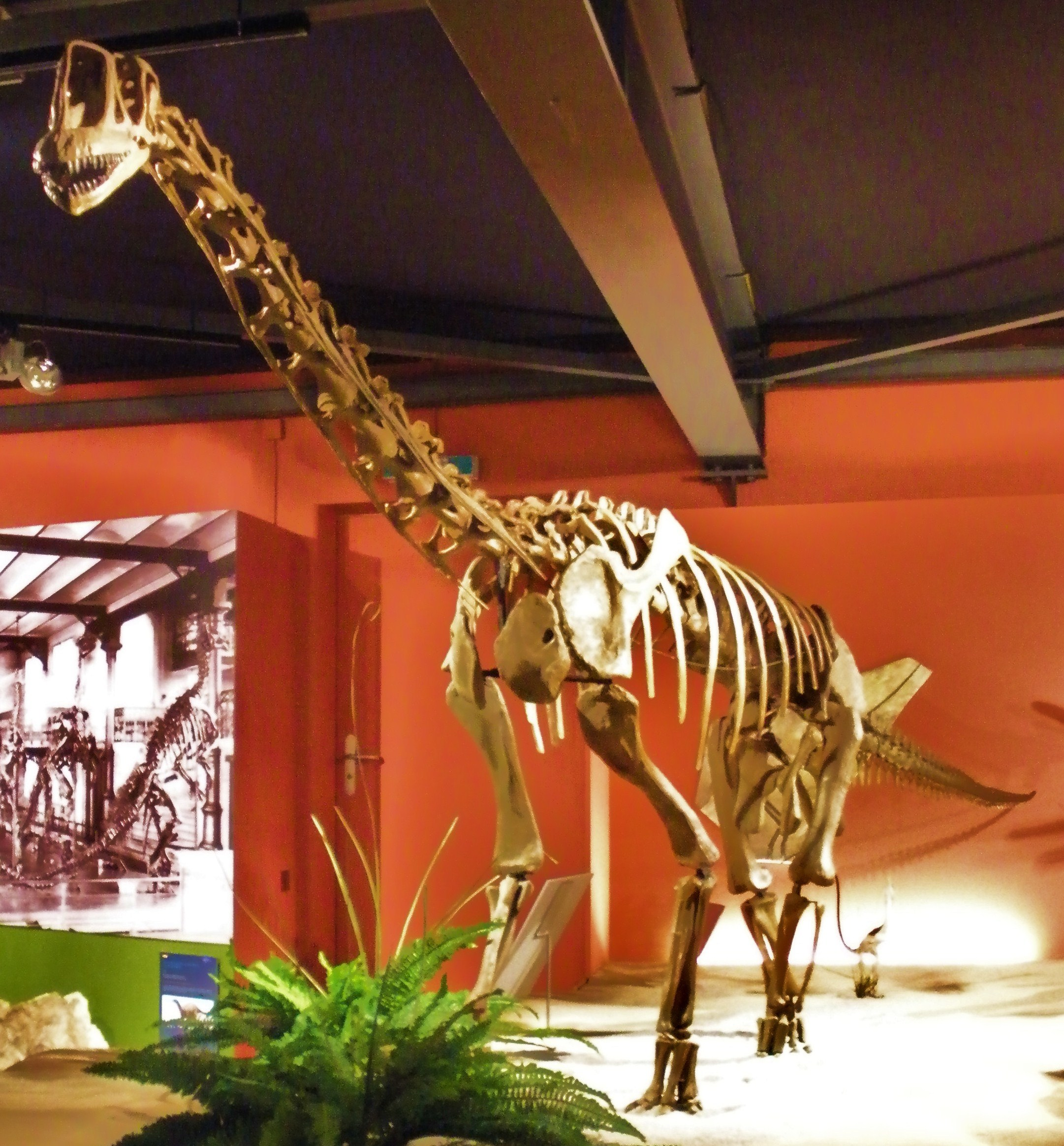
- Reconstructed skeleton, Aathal Dinosaur Museum

Scientific classification
- Kingdom: Animalia
- Phylum: Chordata
- Class: Reptilia
- Clade: Dinosauria
- Clade: Saurischia
- Clade: †Sauropodomorpha
- Clade: †Sauropoda
- Clade: †Macronaria
- Clade: †Camarasauromorpha
- Genus: †Europasaurus; Mateus et al. in Sander et al., 2006
- Species: †E. holgeri

Binomial name
- †Europasaurus holgeri Mateus et al. in Sander et al., 2006

= Europasaurus =

Europasaurus Temporal range: Late Jurassic, 154–151 Ma

Extinct genus of dinosaurs

Europasaurus (meaning 'Europe lizard') is a basal macronarian sauropod, a form of quadrupedal herbivorous dinosaur. It lived during the Late Jurassic (middle Kimmeridgian, from about 154 to 151 million years ago) of northern Germany, and has been identified as an example of insular dwarfism resulting from the isolation of a sauropod population on an island within the Lower Saxony basin.

== Discovery and naming ==
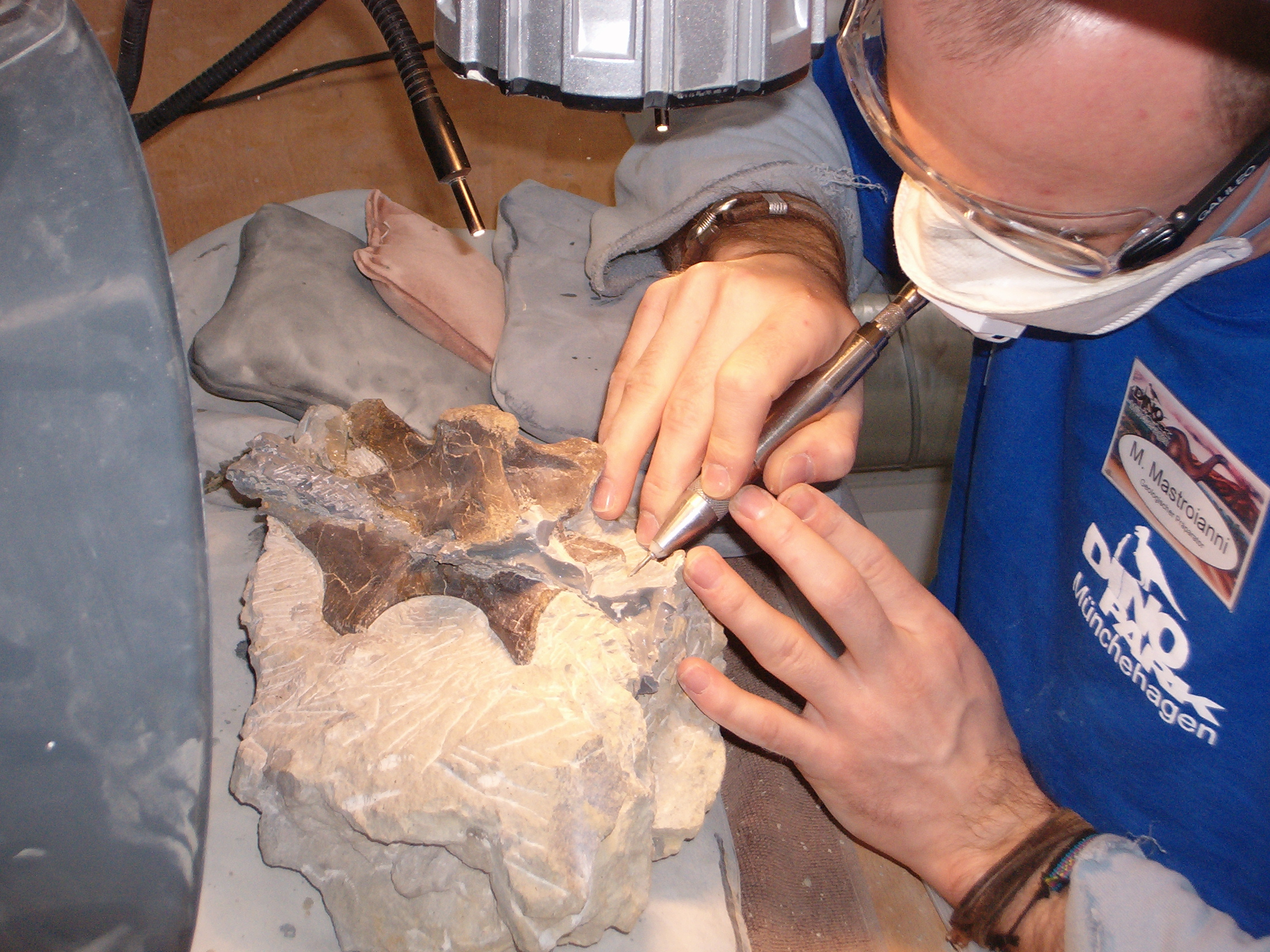
Preparation of the fossil bones

In 1998, a single sauropod tooth was discovered by private fossil collector Holger Lüdtke in an active quarry at Langenberg Mountain, between the communities of Oker, Harlingerode and Göttingerode in Germany. The Langenberg chalk quarry had been active for more than a century; rocks are quarried using blasting and are mostly processed into fertilisers. The quarry exposes a nearly continuous, 203 m (666 ft) thick succession of carbonate rocks belonging to the Süntel Formation, that ranges in age from the early Oxfordian to late Kimmeridgian stages and have been deposited in a shallow sea with a water depth of less than 30 m (98 ft). The layers exposed in the quarry are oriented nearly vertically and slightly overturned, which is a result of the ascent of the adjacent Harz mountains during the Lower Cretaceous. Widely known as a classical exposure among geologists, the quarry had been extensively studied, and visited by students of geology for decades. Although rich in fossils of marine invertebrates, fossils of land-living animals had been rare. The sauropod tooth was the first specimen of a sauropod dinosaur from the Jurassic of northern Germany.

After more fossil material was found, including bones, excavation of the bone-bearing layer commenced in April 1999, conducted by a local association of private fossil collectors. Although the quarry operator was cooperative, excavation was complicated by the near-vertical orientation of the layers that limited access, as well as by the ongoing quarrying. The sauropod material could not be excavated directly from the layer but had to be collected from lose blocks that resulting from blasting. The exact origin of the bone material was therefore unclear, but could later be traced to a single bed (bed 83). An excavation conducted between July 20 and 28, 2000, rescued ca. 50 t (49 long tons; 55 short tons) of bone-bearing blocks containing vertebrate remains. Fossils were prepared and stored in the Dinosaur Park Münchehagen (DFMMh), a private dinosaur open-air museum located close to Hanover. Due to the very good preservation of the bones, consolidating agents had to be applied only occasionally, and preparation could be conducted comparatively quickly as bone would separate easily from the surrounding rock. Bones of simple shape could sometimes be prepared in less than an hour, while the preparation of a sacrum required a workload of three weeks. By January 2001, 200 single vertebrate bones had already been prepared. At this point, the highest bone density was found in a block measuring 70 x 70 cm, which contained ca. 20 bones. By January 2002, preparation of an even larger block had revealed a partial sauropod skull – the first to be discovered in Europe. Before complete removal of the bones from the block, a silicon cast was made of the block to document the precise three-dimensional position of the individual bones.

Part of the Europasaurus fossil material got damaged or destroyed by arson fire on the night of 4–5 October 2003. The fire destroyed the laboratory and exhibition hall of the Dinosaur Park Münchehagen, resulting in the loss of 106 bones, which account for 15% of the bones prepared at the time. Furthermore, the fire affected most of the still unprepared blocks, with firefighting water hitting the hot stone causing additional crumbling. Destroyed specimens include DFMMh/FV 100, which included the best preserved vertebral series and the only complete pelvis.

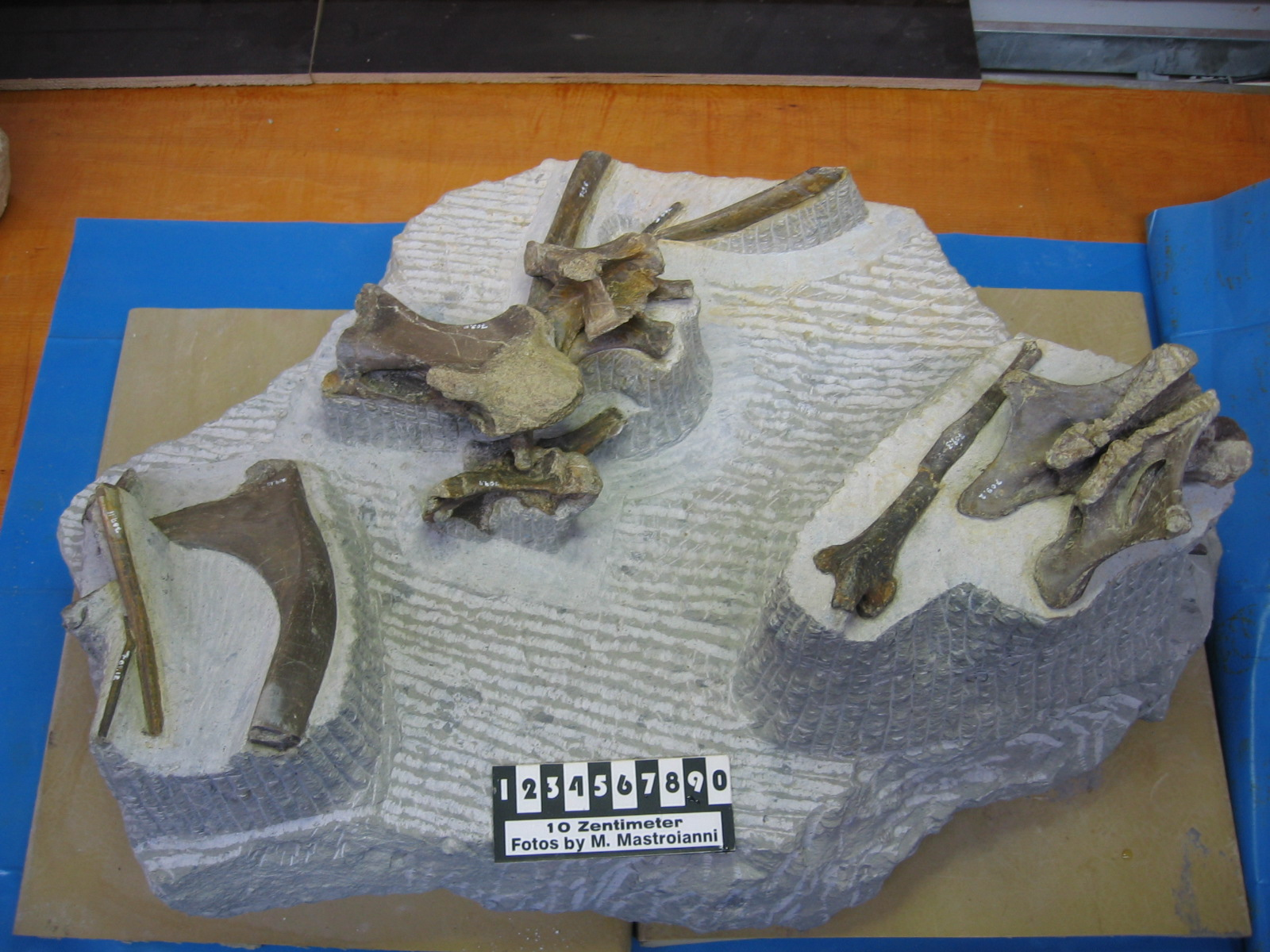
Block with partially prepared bones of specimen DFMMh/FV 709

In 2006, the new sauropod taxon was formally described as Europasaurus holgeri. The given etymology for the genus name is "reptile from Europe", and the specific name honours Holger Lüdtke, the discoverer of the first fossils. Given the comparatively small size of the bones, it was initially assumed that they stem from juvenile individuals. The 2006 publication, however, established that the majority of specimens were adult, and that Europasaurus was an island dwarf. The number of individual sauropod bones had increased to 650 and include variously articulated individuals; the material was found within an area of 60–80 m (200–260 ft) squared. From these specimens, the holotype was selected, a disarticulated but associated individual (DFMMh/FV 291). The holotype includes multiple cranial bones (premaxilla, maxilla and quadratojugal), a partial braincase, multiple mandible bones (dentary, surangular and angular), large amounts of teeth, cervical vertebrae, sacral vertebrae and ribs from the neck and torso. At least 10 other individuals were referred to the same taxon based on overlap in material.

A large-scale excavation campaign commenced in the summer of 2012, with the goal to excavate Europasaurus bones not only from lose blocks but directly from the rock layer. Access to the bone-bearing layer required the removal of some 600 tons of rock using excavators and wheel loaders, and the constant pumping out of water from the base of the quarry. Excavations continued in spring and summer 2013. The campaign resulted in the discovery of new fish, turtle, and crocodile remains, as well as valuable information of the bone-bearing layer; additional Europasaurus bones, however, could not be located. By 2014, around 1300 vertebrate bones had been prepared from bed 83, the majority of which stemming from Europasaurus; an estimated 3000 additional bones await preparation. A minimum number of 20 individuals was identified based on jaw bones.

== Description ==
Europasaurus scale diagram

Europasaurus is a very small sauropod, measuring only 5.7–6.2 m (19–20 ft) long and weighed 750–2,100 kilograms (1,650–4,630 lb) as an adult. This length was estimated based on a partial femur, scaled to the size of a nearly complete Camarasaurus specimen. Younger individuals are known, from sizes of 3.7 m (12 ft) to the youngest juvenile at 1.75 m (5.7 ft).

=== Distinguishing characteristics ===
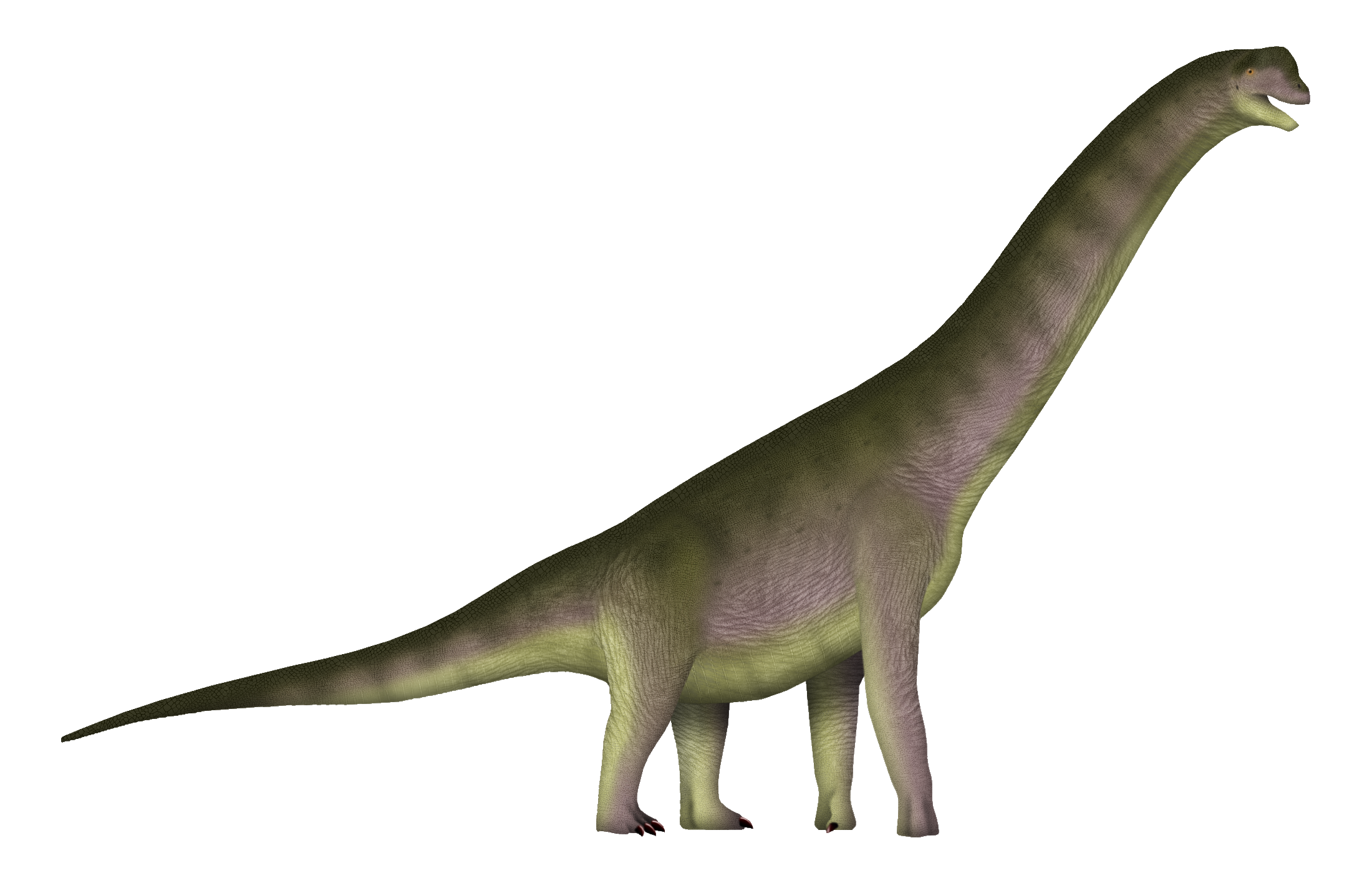
Life restoration

Aside from being a very small neosauropod, Europasaurus was thought to have multiple unique morphological features to distinguish it from close relatives by its original describers, Sander et al. (2006). The nasal process of the premaxilla was thought to curve anteriorly while projecting upwards (now known to be preservational), there is a notch on the upper surface of the centra of cervical vertebrae, the scapula has a prominent process on the posterior surface of its body, and the astragalus (an ankle bone) is twice as wide as tall.

When compared to Camarasaurus, Europasaurus has a different morphology of the postorbital where the posterior flange is not as short, a short contact between the nasal and frontal bones of the skull, the shape of its parietal (rectangular in Europasaurus), and the neural spines of its vertebrae in front of the pelvis are unsplit. Comparisons with Brachiosaurus (now named Giraffatitan) were also mentioned, and it was identified that Europasaurus has a shorter snout, a contact between the quadratojugal and squamosal, and a humerus (upper forelimb bone) that has flattened and aligned proximal and distal surfaces. There were finally quick comparisons to the potential brachiosaurid Lusotitan, which has a different ilium and astragalus shape, and Cetiosaurus humerocristatus (named Duriatitan), which has a deltopectoral crest that is less prominent and extends across less of the humerus.

=== Skull ===
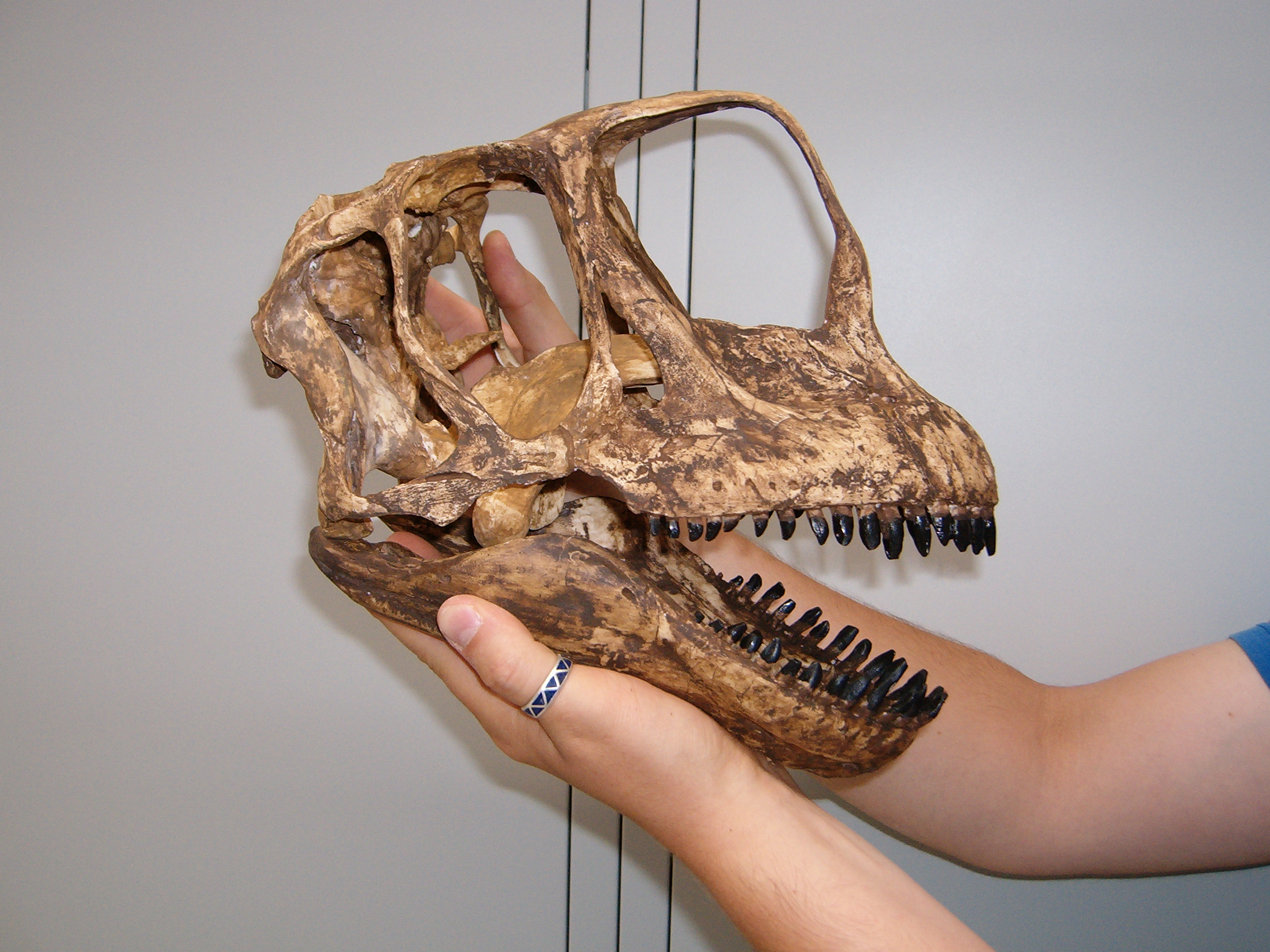
Reconstructed skull

Nearly all external skull bones have been preserved among Europasaurus specimens, except the prefrontals. Some additional bones are only represented by very fragmented and uninformative fossils, such as the lacrimals. Eight premaxillae are known, with a generally rectangular snout shape as found in Camarasaurus. The anterior projection of the premaxilla identified in Sander et al. (2006) was re-identified as a preservational artifact in Marpmann et al. (2014), similar to the anatomy found in Camarasaurus and Euhelopus to a lesser degree. The dorsal projection of the premaxilla, the one which contacts the nasal bone, begins as a postero-dorsal projection, before becoming straight vertical at the point of the subnarial foramen, until it reaches the nasal. This weak "step" is seen in Camarasaurus and Euhelopus, and is present more strongly in Abydosaurus, Giraffatitan and a possible skull of Brachiosaurus. These latter taxa also have a longer snout, with more distance from the first tooth until the nasal process of the premaxilla. As well, Europasaurus shares with the basal camarasauromorphs (brachiosaurids, Camarasaurus, Euhelopus and Malawisaurus) a similarly sized orbit and nasal fenestra, whereas the nasal opening is significantly reduced in derived titanosaurs (Rapetosaurus, Tapuiasaurus and Nemegtosaurus).

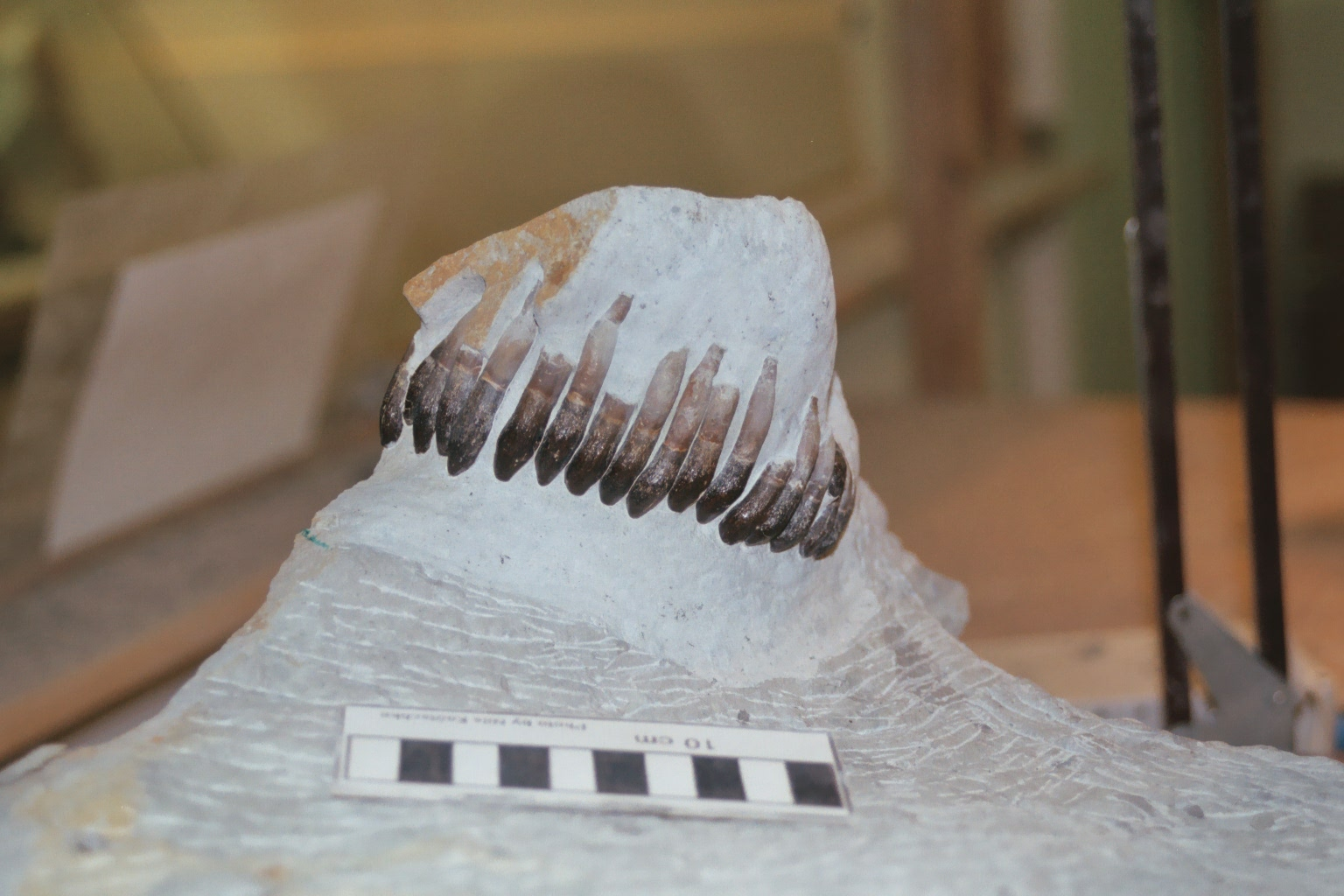
Teeth of the upper jaw

A single maxilla is present in the well-preserved material of Europasaurus, DFMMh/FV 291.17. This maxilla has a long body, with two elongate processes, a nasal and a posterior process. There is only a weak lacrimal process, like in most sauropods except Rapetosaurus. The nasal process is elongate and covers the anterior and ventral rim of the antorbital fenestra. This process extends about 120º from the horizontal tooth row. The base of the nasal process also forms the body of the lacrimal process, and at their divergence is the antorbital fenestra, similar in shape to those of Camarasaurus, Euhelopus, Abydosaurus and Giraffatitan, but about 1/2 taller proportionally. The pre-antorbital fenestra, a small opening in front of or beneath the antorbital opening, is well developed in taxa like Diplodocus and Tapuiasaurus, is nearly absent, like in Camarasaurus and Euhelopus. There were about 12–13 total teeth in the maxilla of Europasaurus, fewer than in more basal taxa (16 teeth in Jobaria and 14–25 in Atlasaurus), but falling within the range of variation in Brachiosauridae (15 in Brachiosaurus to 10 in Abydosaurus). All of the unworn teeth preserved display up to four small denticles on their mesial edges. A small amount of the posterior tooth crowns are slightly twisted (~15º), but much less than in brachiosaurids (30–45º).

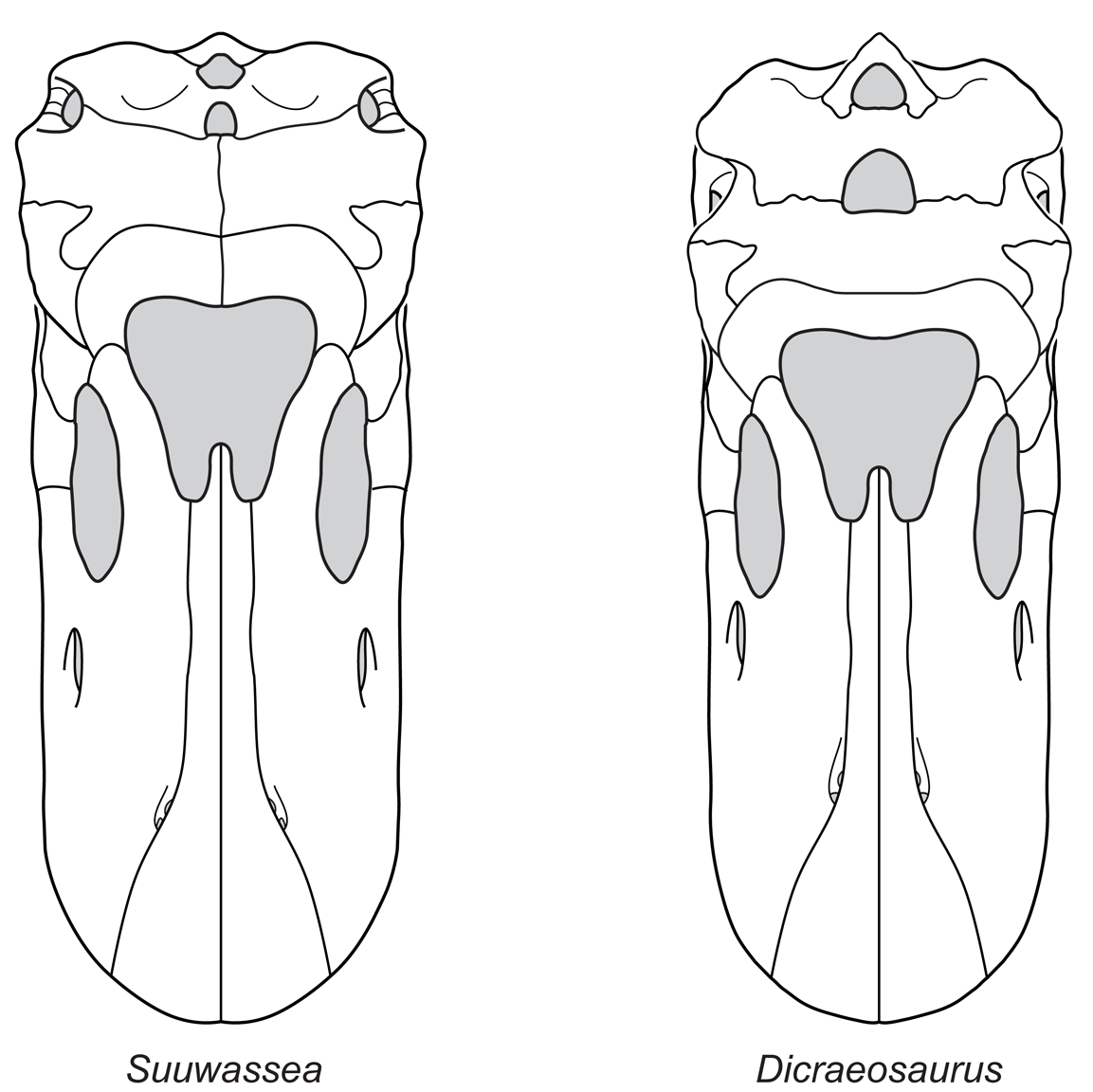
Skulls of two dicraeosaurids in dorsal view, showing the placement of the parietal fenestra and the postparietal foramen

Among the nasal bones of Europasaurus, several are known, but few are complete or undistorted. The nasals are overlapped posteriorly by the frontal bones, and towards the side, they articulate bluntly with the prefrontals. Unlike the nasals of Giraffatitan, those in Europasaurus project horizontally forwards, forming a small portion of the skull roof over the antorbital fenestrae. Four frontals are known from Europasaurus, three being from the left and one being from the right. Because of their disarticulation, it is likely that the frontals never fused during growth, unlike in Camarasaurus. The frontals form a portion of the skull roof, articulating with other bones such as the nasals, parietals, prefrontals and postorbitals, and they are longer antero-posteriorly than they are wide, a unique character among a eusauropodan. Like in diplodocoids (Amargasaurus, Dicraeosaurus and Diplodocus), as well as Camarasaurus, the frontals are excluded from the frontoparietal fenestra (or parietal fenestra when frontals are excluded). The frontals are also excluded from the supratemporal fenestra margin (a widespread character in sauropods more derived than Shunosaurus), and they only have a small, unornamented participation in the orbit. Several parietal bones are known in Europasaurus, which show a rectangular shape much wider than long. the parietals are also wide when viewed from the back of the skull, being slightly taller than the foramen magnum (spinal cord opening). The parietals contribute to about half the post-temporal fenestra (opening above the very back of the skull) border, with the other region enclosed by the squamosal bones and some braincase bones. Parietals also form part of the edge of the supratemporal fenestra, which is wider than long in Europasaurus, like in Giraffatitan, Camarasaurus and Spinophorosaurus. Besides the before mentioned fenestra, the parietals also have a "postparietal fenestra", something rarely seen outside of Dicraeosauridae. A triradiate postorbital bone is present in Europasaurus, which evolved as the fusion of the postfrontal and postorbital bone of more basal taxa. Between the anterior and ventrally projecting processes the postorbital forms the margin of the orbit, and between the posterior and ventral processes it borders the infratemporal fenestra.

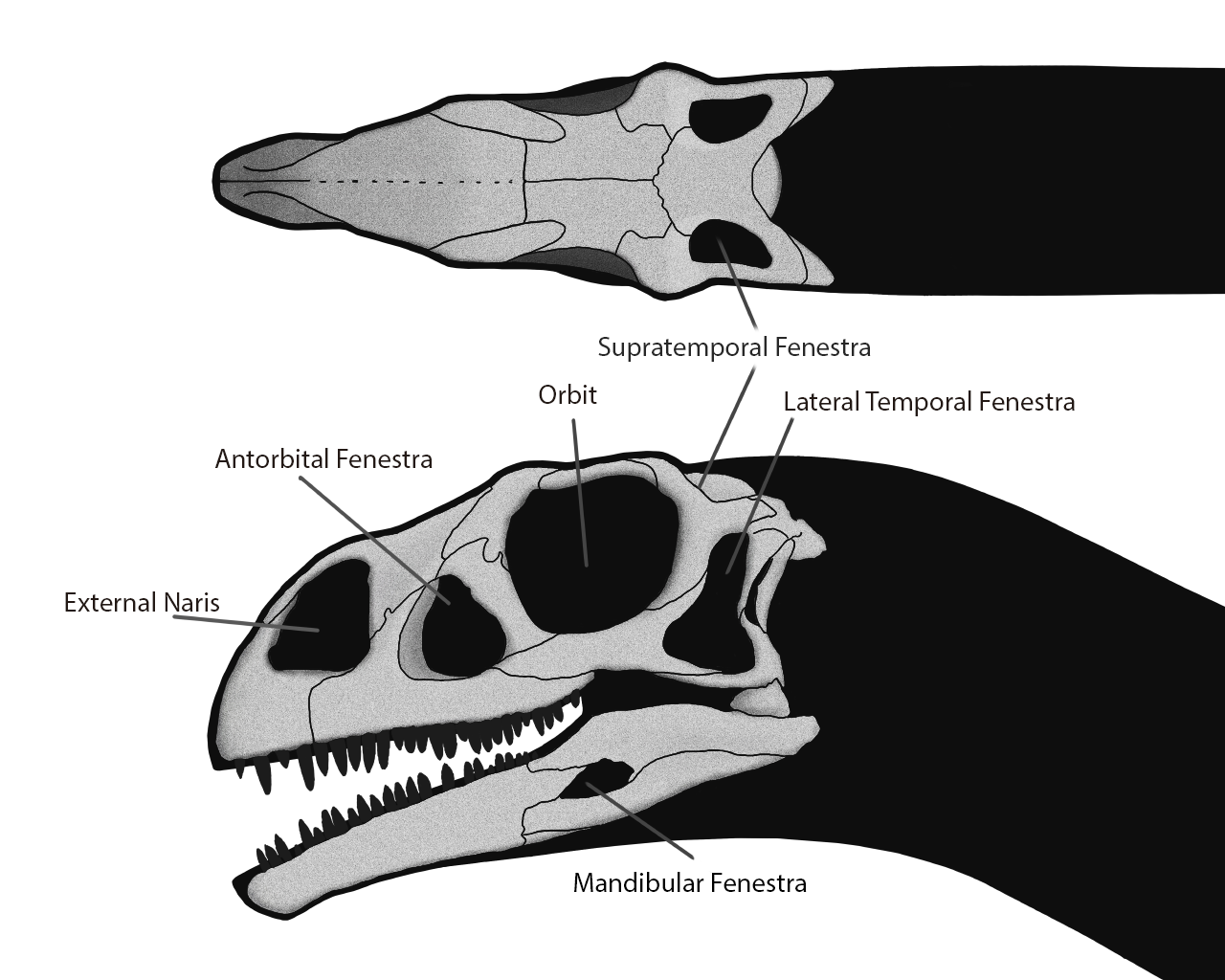
Skull of Massospondylus with fenestrae labelled. The jugal is similar in form to that of Europasaurus

Multiple jugals are known from Europasaurus, which are more similar in morphology to basal sauropodomorphs than other macronarians. It forms part of the border of the orbit, infratemporal fenestra and the bottom edge of the skull, but does not reach the antorbital fenestra. The posterior process of the jugal are very fragile and narrow, showing a bone scar from the articulation with the quadratojugal. There are two prominences projecting from the back of the jugal body, which diverge at 75º and form the bottom and front edges of the infratemporal fenestra. Like in Riojasaurus and Massospondylus, two non-sauropod sauropodomorphs, the jugal forms a large part of the orbit edge, from the back to the front bottom corner. This feature has been seen in embryos of titanosaurs, but no adult individuals. The quadratojugal bone is an elongate element that has two projecting arms, one anterior and one dorsal. Like in other sauropods, the anterior process is longer than the dorsal, but in Europasaurus the arms are more similar lengths. The horizontal process is parallel to the tooth row of Europasaurus, similar to in Camarasaurus but unlike in Giraffatitan and Abydosaurus. There is a prominent ventral flange on the anterior arm of the bone, which is a possible synapomorphy of Brachiosauridae, although it is also found in some Camarasaurus individuals. The two quadratojugal processes diverge at a nearly right angle (90º), although the dorsal process curves as it follows the shape of the quadrate. Squamosals found from Europasaurus show the same approximate shape in lateral view as Camarasaurus, that of a question mark. The squamosals articulate with many skull bones, including those of the skull roof, those of the ventral skull, and those of the braincase. Like the postorbitals, the squamosals are triradiate, with a ventral, anterior and medial process.

There are thirteen preserved elements of the palate of Europasaurus, including the quadrate, pterygoid and ectopterygoid. The quadrates articulate with the palate and braincase bones, as well as the external skull bones. They are similar in shape to those of Giraffatitan and Camarasaurus, and have well-developed articular surfaces. A single shaft is present for a majority of the quadrates length, with a pterygoid wing along the medial side. Pterygoids are the largest of the sauropod palate bones, and it has a triradiate shape, like the postorbitals. An anterior projection contacts the opposite pterygoid, while a lateral wing contacts the ectopterygoid, and a posterior wing supports the quadrate and basipterygoid (a bone that provides connection between the palate and the braincase). The ectopterygoid is a small palate bone, which articulates the central palate bones (pterygoid and palatine) with the maxilla. Ectopterygoids are L-shaped, with an anterior process attaching to the maxilla, and a dorsal process that meets the pterygoid.

=== Vertebrae ===
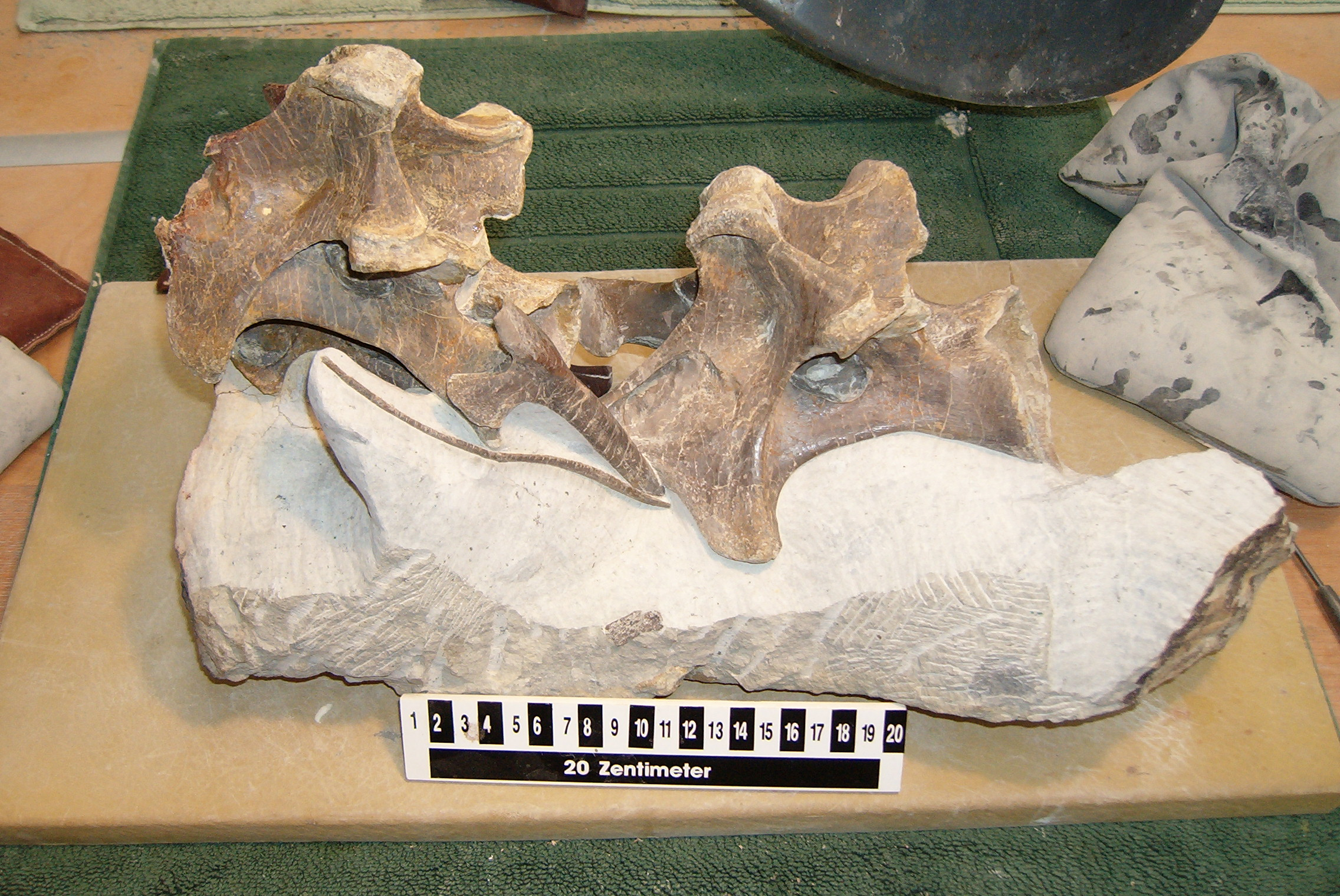
Articulated neck-vertebrae of specimen DFMMh/FV 838

The cervical vertebrae of Europasaurus are the best preserved and most represented of the vertebral column. However, not the entire neck is known, so the cervical number could be between Camarasaurus (12 vertebrae) and Rapetosaurus (17 vertebrae). Additionally, the multiple cervical vertebrae come from different-aged individuals, and the centrum length and internal structure are known to change throughout development. The adult cervical centra are elongated and opisthocoelous (anterior end is ball-shaped), with a notch in the top of the rear end of the centrum. This feature was described as characteristic of Europasaurus but is also known in Euhelopus and Giraffatitan. In the side of the centra of Europasaurus there is an excavation which opens into the internal pneumaticity of the vertebrae. Unlike in Giraffatitan and brachiosaurids, Europasaurus does not have thin ridges (laminae) dividing this opening. Europasaurus shares laminae features on the upper vertebrae with basal macronarians and brachiosaurids. Differing from the anterior and middle cervicals, the posterior cervical vertebrae are less elongate, and taller proportionally, like in other macronarians, with significant changes in the positions of articular surfaces.

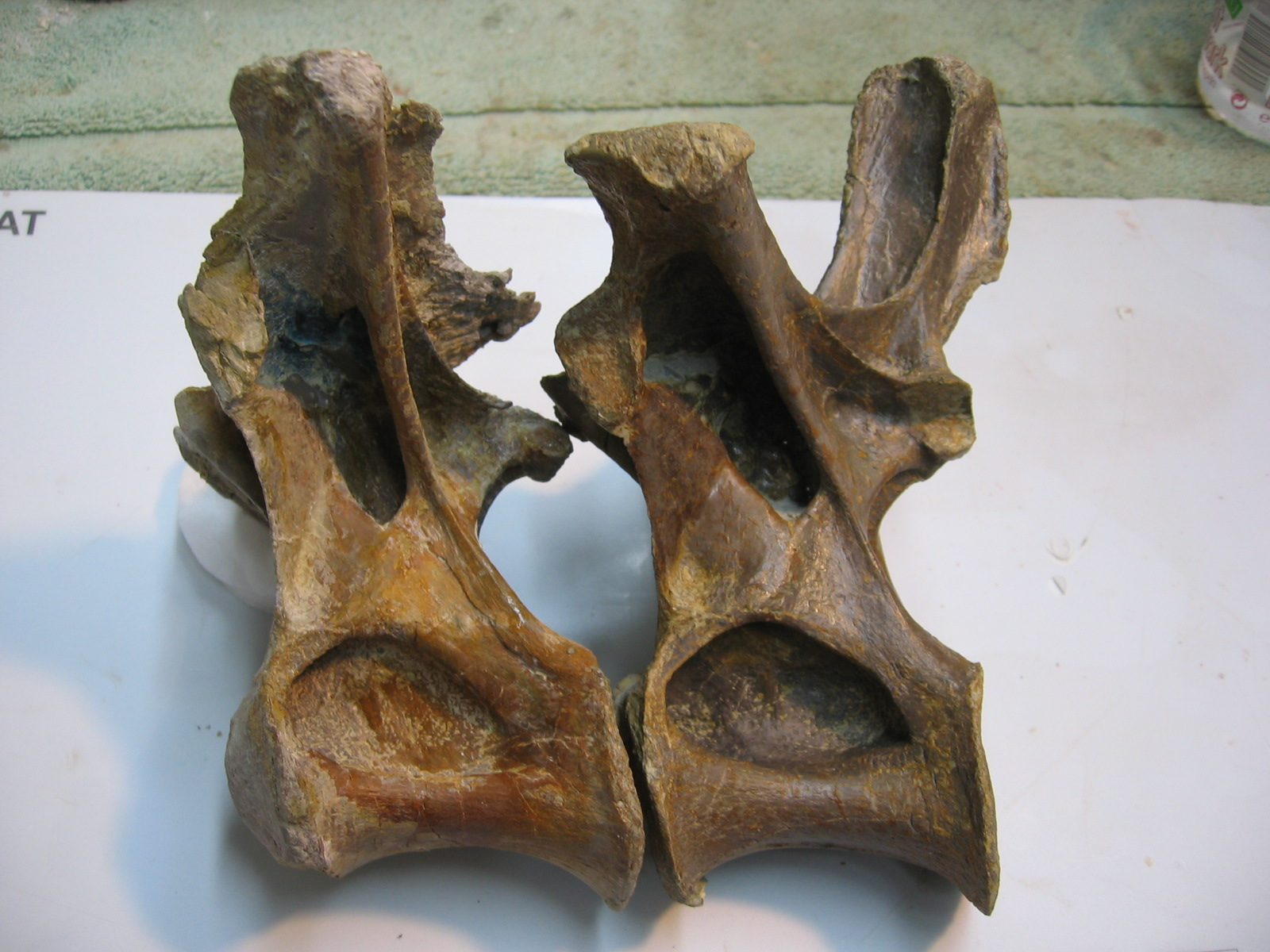
Two back-vertebrae

Front dorsal vertebrae are strongly opisthocoelous like the cervicals, and can be placed in the series based on the absence of the hypantrum and low parapophysis placement. The internal structures are open and camerate like Camarasaurus, Giraffatitan and Galvesaurus, but unlike these taxa this pneumaticity does not extend into the middle and posterior dorsal vertebrae. The arrangement and presence of anterior laminae in Europasaurus is similar to other basal macronarians, but unlike more basal taxa (e.g. Mamenchisaurus, Haplocanthosaurus) and more derived taxa (e.g. Giraffatitan). The middle dorsals possess a pneumatic cavity that extends upwards into the neural arch, like in Barapasaurus, Cetiosaurus, Tehuelchesaurus, and Camarasaurus. The ventral edge of this opening is rhomboidal and well-defined. In the posterior vertebrae, the lateral pneumatic cavity has shifted higher on the centrum, a change seen in other basal macronarians. These pleurocoels are wide anteriorly, and narrow to become acutely angled posteriorly. The neural spine of Europasaurus stands vertically, a basal feature not seen in Brachiosaurus or more derived sauropods.

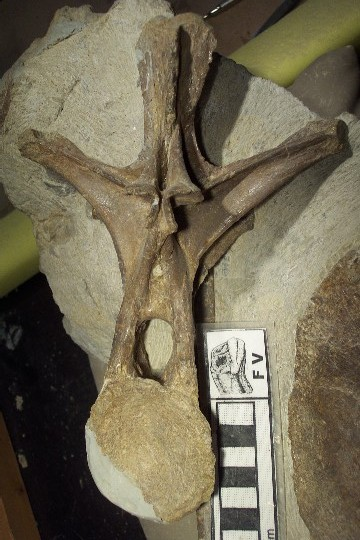
Back-vertebra in front view

A series of all complete sacral vertebrae is only known from a single specimen, DFMMh/FV 100, which was destroyed in a fire in 2003. All five vertebrae, the characteristic number of more basal neosauropods, are incorporated into the sacrum. The third and fourth sacrals represent the primordial sacrals, present in all dinosaur groups. The second, S2, is the ancestral sauropodomorph sacral that was added in basal sauropodomorphs, who all share three sacrals to the exception of Plateosaurus. The fifth sacral, fused behind the primordial pair, is a caudosacral, migrated from the tail into the pelvis in taxa around Leonerasaurus. The first sacral, articulated with the ilium but not fused to the other vertebrae, represents the dorsosacral, bringing the count to five vertebrae found in all neosauropods. The level of fusion of the dorsosacral confirms the evolutionary history of the sauropod sacral count: the primordial pair incorporating first a dorsal (total of three), then a caudal (total of four), then another dorsal to make a total of five vertebrae.

=== Skin ===
Among macronarians, fossilized skin impressions are only known from Haestasaurus, Tehuelchesaurus and Saltasaurus. Both Tehuelchesaurus and Haestasaurus may be closely related to Europasaurus, and the characteristics of all sauropod skin impressions are similar. Haestasaurus, the first dinosaur known from skin impressions, preserved integument over a portion of the arm around the elbow joint. Dermal impressions are more widespread in the material of Tehuelchesaurus, where they are known from the areas of the forelimb, scapula and torso. There are no bony plates or nodules, to indicate armour, but there are several types of scales. The skin types of Tehuelchesaurus are overall more similar to those found in diplodocids and Haestasaurus than in the titanosaur embryos of Auca Mahuevo. As the shape and articulation of the preserved tubercles in these basal macronarians are similar in other taxa where skin is preserved, including specimens of Brontosaurus excelsus and intermediate diplodocoids, such dermal structures are probably widespread throughout Neosauropoda.

== Classification ==
When it was first named, Europasaurus was considered to be a taxon within Macronaria that didn't fall within the family Brachiosauridae or the clade Titanosauromorpha. This indicated that the dwarfism of the taxon was a result of evolution, instead of being a characteristic of a group. Three matrices were analysed with the inclusion of Europasaurus, that of Wilson (2002) and Upchurch (1998) and Upchurch et al. (2004). All analyses resulted in similar phylogenetics, where Europasaurus placed more derived than Camarasaurus but outside a clade of Brachiosauridae and Titanosauromorpha (now named Titanosauriformes). The results of the favoured analysis of Sander et al. (2006) are shown below on the left:

- Sauropoda
  - Omeisaurus
  - - Euhelopus
    - - Diplodocoidea
      - Macronaria
        - Camarasaurus
        - - Europasaurus
          - - Brachiosauridae
              - Brachiosaurus
              - Cedarosaurus
            - Titanosauromorpha
              - Lapparentosaurus
              - - Phuwiangosaurus
                - - Pleurocoelus
                  - Titanosauria

- Macronaria
  - Haplocanthosaurus
  - - - Camarasaurus
      - Bellusaurus
    - - Europasaurus
      - - Galvesaurus
        - - Tehuelchesaurus
          - Tastavinsaurus
        - - Euhelopus
          - - Titanosauromorpha
            - Brachiosauridae
              - - Brachiosaurus
                - Giraffatitan
              - - Paluxysaurus
                - - Venenosaurus
                  - Cedarosaurus

During a description of the vertebrae of Europasaurus by Carballido & Sander (2013), another phylogenetic analysis was conducted (right column above). The cladistic matrix was expanded to include more sauropod taxa, such as Bellusaurus, Cedarosaurus and Tapuiasaurus. The taxon Brachiosaurus was also separated into true Brachiosaurus (B. altithorax) and Giraffatitan (B. brancai), based on Taylor (2009). Based on this newer and more expansive analysis, Europasaurus was found to be in a similar placement, as a basal camarasauromorph closer to titanosaurs than Camarasaurus. However, Euhelopus, Tehuelchesaurus, Tastavinsaurus and Galvesaurus were placed between Europasaurus and Brachiosauridae.

=== Placement as a brachiosaurid ===
In a 2012 analysis of the phylogeny of Titanosauriformes, D'Emic (2012) considered Europasaurus to belong to Brachiosauridae, instead of being basal to the earliest brachiosaurids. The phylogeny resolved the most true brachiosaurids to date, although several potential brachiosaurids were instead determined to belong to Somphospondyli (Paluxysaurus, Sauroposeidon and Qiaowanlong). However, D'Emic was tentative in considering Europasaurus to be a confirmed brachiosaurid. While there was strong support in the phylogeny for its placement, Europasaurus, one of few basal macronarians with a skull, lacks multiple bones that display characteristic features of the group, such as caudal vertebrae. The cladogram below on the left illustrates the phylogenetic results of D'Emic (2012), with Euhelopodidae and Titanosauria collapsed.

- Macronaria
  - Camarasaurus
  - - Tehuelchesaurus
    - - Brachiosauridae
        - Europasaurus
        - - Giraffatitan
          - - Brachiosaurus
            - - Abydosaurus
              - Cedarosaurus
              - Venenosaurus
      - Somphospondyli
        - Ligabuesaurus
        - - Sauroposeidon
          - - Tastavinsaurus
            - - Euhelopodidae
              - - Chubutisaurus
                - Titanosauria

- Macronaria
  - Camarasaurus
  - - Tehuelchesaurus
    - - Brachiosauridae
        - Europasaurus
        - - Brachiosaurus
          - - Giraffatitan
            - - Lusotitan
              - Sonorasaurus
          - Laurasiformes
            - Abydosaurus
            - Cedarosaurus
            - Soriatitan
            - Tastavinsaurus
            - Venenosaurus
      - Somphospondyli
        - Ligabuesaurus
        - - Sauroposeidon
          - - Euhelopodidae
            - - Chubutisaurus
              - Titanosauria

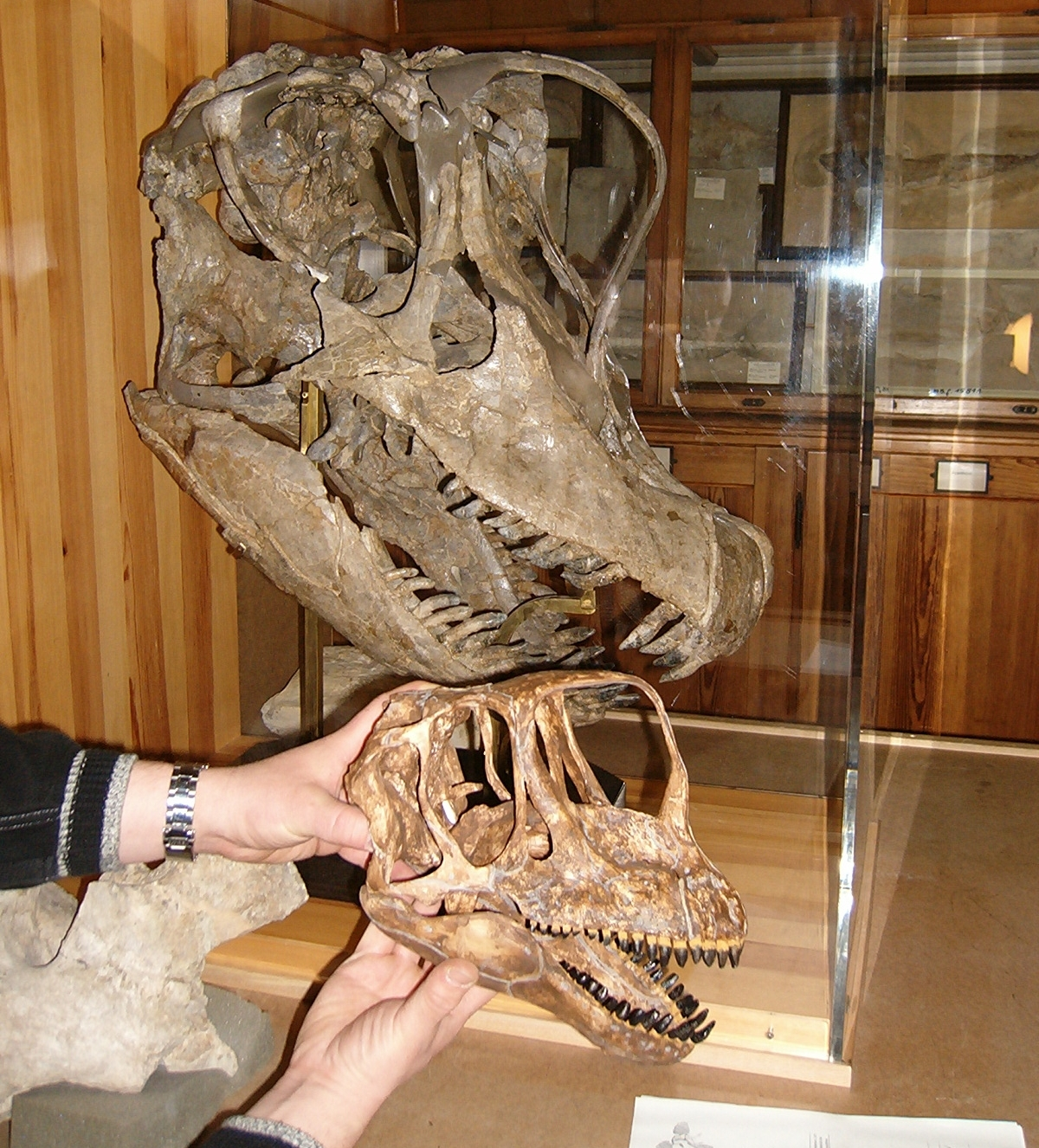
Skull compared to that of related Giraffatitan

A later analysis on titanosauriformes agreed with D'Emic (2012) in the placement of Europasaurus. It formed a polytomy with Brachiosaurus and the "French Bothriospondylus" (named Vouivria) as the basalmost brachiosaurids. Next most derived in the clade was Lusotitan, with Giraffatitan, Abydosaurus, Cedarosaurus and Venenosaurus forming a more derived clade of brachiosaurids. The "twisted" teeth of Europasaurus were found to be one of the unique features of Brachiosauridae, which could mean a confident referral of isolated sauropod teeth to the clade.

A further phylogenetic analysis was performed on Brachiosauridae, based on that of D'Emic (2012). This phylogeny, conducted by D'Emic et al. (2016), resolved a very similar placement of Europasaurus within Brachiosauridae, although Sonorasaurus was placed in a clade with Giraffatitan, and Lusotitan was placed in a polytomy with Abydosaurus and Cedarosaurus. The remaining tree was the same as in D'Emic (2012), although Brachiosaurus was collapsed into a polytomy with more derived brachiosaurids. Another phylogeny, Mannion et al. (2017) found similar results to D'Emic (2012) and D'Emic et al. (2016). Europasaurus was the basalmost brachiosaurid, with the "French Bothriospondylus", or Vouivria, as the next most basal brachiosaurid. Brachiosaurus was placed outside of a polytomy of all other brachiosaurids, Giraffatitan, Abydosaurus, Sonorasaurus, Cedarosaurus and Venenosaurus. A 2017 phylogeny, that of Royo-Torres et al. (2017), resolved more complex relations within Brachiosauridae. Besides Europasaurus as the basalmost brachiosaurid, there were two subgroups within the clade, one containing Giraffatitan, Sonorasaurus and Lusotitan, and another including almost all other brachiosaurids, as well as Tastavinsaurus. This second clade would be termed Laurasiformes under the group's definition. Brachiosaurus was in a polytomy with the two subclades of Brachiosauridae. The phylogeny of Royo-Torres et al. (2017) can be seen above, in the right column.

== Paleobiology ==
=== Growth ===
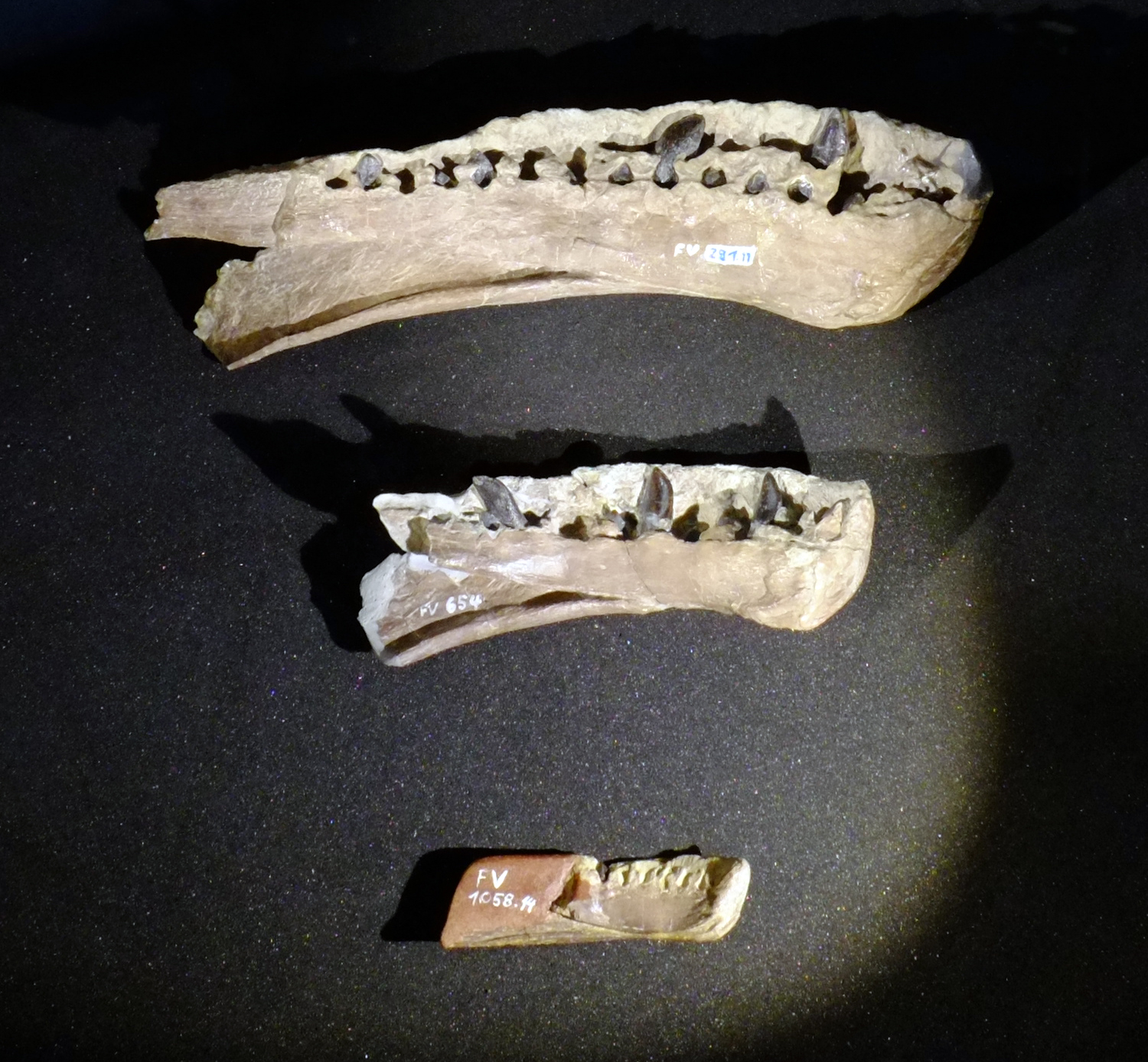
Lower jaws at various growth stages

It was identified that Europasaurus was a unique dwarf species, and not a juvenile of an existing taxon like Camarasaurus, by a histology analysis of multiple specimens of Europasaurus. The youngest specimen (DFMMh/FV 009) was shown by this analysis to lack signs of aging such as growth marks or laminar bone tissue, and is also the smallest specimen at 1.75 m (5.7 ft) in length. Such bone tissue is an indicator of rapid growth, so the specimen is probably a young juvenile. A larger specimen (DFMMh/FV 291.9) at 2 m (6.6 ft) shows large amounts of laminar tissue, with no growth marks present, so is likely a juvenile as well. The next smallest specimen (DFMMh/FV 001) has shows the presence of growth marks (specifically annuli), and at the length of 3.5 m (11 ft) is possibly a subadult. Further larger, DFMMh/FV 495 displays mature osteons as well as annuli, and is 3.7 m (12 ft). The second largest analysed specimen (DFMMh/FV 153) also shows growth marks, but they are more frequent. This specimen is 4.2 m (14 ft). A single partial femur represents the largest known Europasaurus individual, at a body length of 6.2 m (20 ft). Unlike all other specimens, this one (DFMMh/FV 415) shows the presence of lines of arrested growth, indicating it died after reaching full body size. The internal bone is also partially lamellar, which shows it had stopped growing recently.

These combinations of growth factors show that Europasaurus developed its small size because of a largely reduced growth rate, gaining size slower than larger taxa such as Camarasaurus. This slowing growth rate is the opposite of the general trend of sauropods and theropods, who reached greater sizes with increased growth rates. Some of the close relatives of Europasaurus represent the largest dinosaurs known, including Brachiosaurus and Sauroposeidon. Marpmann et al. (2014) proposed that the small size and reduced growth rate of Europasaurus was an effect of pedomorphism, where the adults of taxa retain juvenile characteristics, such as size.

Examinations of the inner ears of infant Europasaurus suggest they were precocial, and it is suggested that they would have been reliant on the protections of adults in a herd to some degree, something not seen in larger sauropods due to the massive size difference in parent and offspring. The structure and long length of the inner ear in this genus also suggests that they had good senses of hearing, with Europasaurus. Intraspecific communication was also apparently important to this sauropod, based on these studies, suggesting this sauropod displayed clear, gregarious behavior.

=== Dwarfism ===
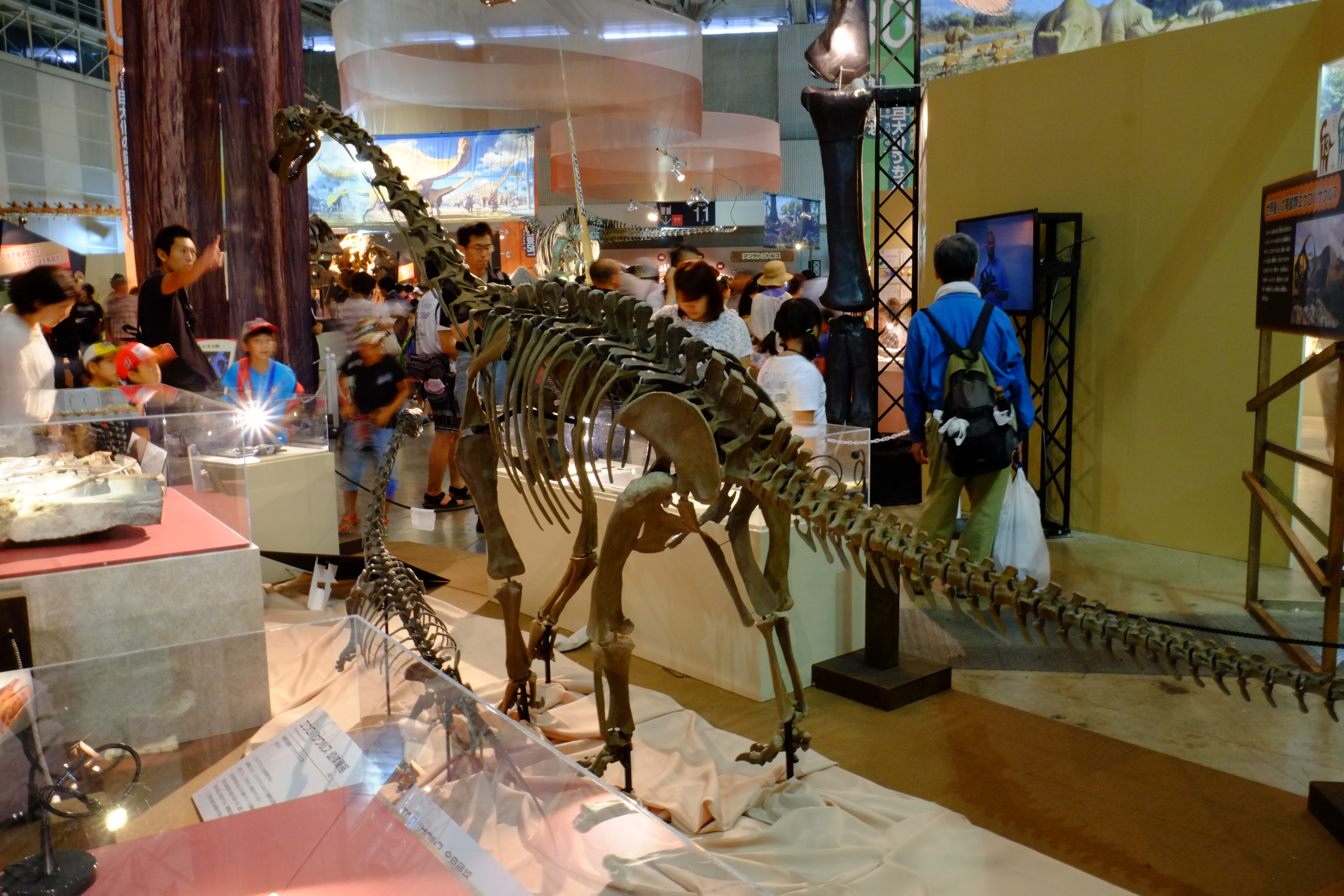
Reconstructed adult and juvenile skeletons; note humans for scale

It has been suggested that an ancestor of Europasaurus would have quickly decreased in body size after emigrating to an island that existed at the time, as the largest of the islands in the region around northern Germany was smaller than 200,000 km (120,000 mi) squared, which may not have been able to support a community of large sauropods. Alternately, a macronarian may have shrunken concurrently with a larger landmass, until achieving the size of Europasaurus. Previous studies on insular (island) dwarfism are largely restricted to the Maastrichtian of Haţeg Island in Romania, home to the dwarf titanosaur Magyarosaurus and the dwarf hadrosaur Telmatosaurus. Telmatosaurus is known to be from a small adult, and although it is very small, Magyarosaurus specimens of small sizes are known to be from adult to old individuals. Magyarosaurus dacus adults were a similar body size to Europasaurus, but the largest of the latter had longer femora than the largest of the former, while Magyarosaurus hungaricus was significantly larger than either taxon. The dwarfism in Europasaurus represents the only significant rapid body mass change in derived Sauropodomorpha, with the general trend of taxa being a growth in overall size in other groups.

== Palaeoecology ==
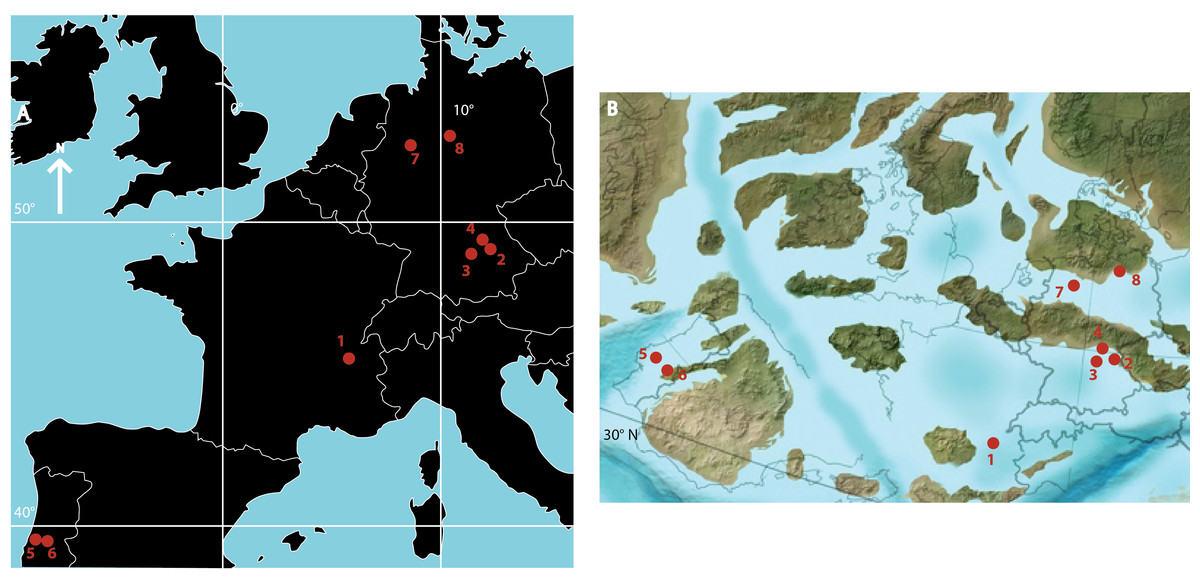
Late Jurassic terrestrial localities in Europe. '7' indicates the Langenberg Quarry

The Langenberg locality in Germany, from the early Oxfordian to late Kimmeridgian, displays the variety of plant and animal life from an island ecosystem from the late Jurassic. During the Kimmeridgian the locality would have been marine, being located between the Rhenisch, Bohemian, and London-Brabant Massifs. This does not indicate that the taxa present were marine, as the animals and plants may have been deposited allochthonously (albeit only by a short distance) from the surrounding islands. The sediments to show that there was an occasional influx of fresh or brackish water, and the fossils preserved display that. There are large numbers of marine bivalve fossils, as well as echinoderms and microfossils present in the limestone of the quarry, although many of the animals and plants were terrestrial.

Many marine taxa are preserved at Langenberg, although they would not have co-existed often with Europasaurus. There are at least three turtle genera, Plesiochelys, Thalassemys and up to two unnamed taxa. Actinopterygian fish are abundant, being represented by Lepidotes, Macromesodon, Proscinetes, Coelodus, Macrosemius, Notagogus, Histionotus, Ionoscopus, Callopterus, Caturus, Sauropsis, Belonostomus, and Thrissops. Also present are at least five distinct morphologies of hybodont sharks, the neoselachians Palaeoscyllium, Synechodus and Asterodermus. Two marine crocodyliforms are known from Langenberg, Machimosaurus and Steneosaurus, which likely fed off turtles and fish, and the amphibious crocodyliform Goniopholis has also been found.

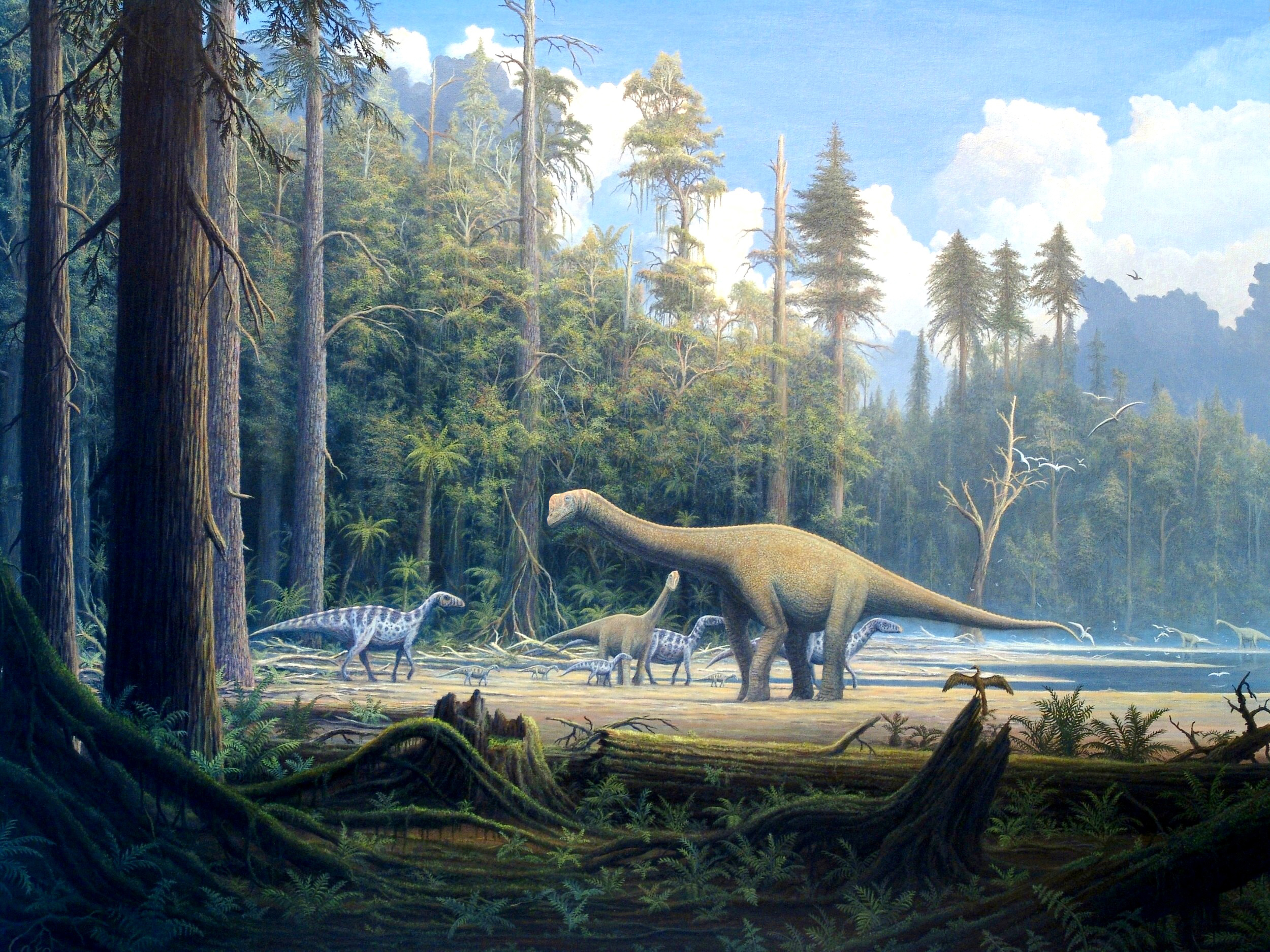
Life restoration of Europasaurus in its habitat

Conifer cones and twigs can be identified as the araucarian Brachyphyllum, from the terrestrial fossils of the site. Deposited in the locality are many taxa, including a large accumulation of Europasaurus bones and individuals. At least 450 bones from Europasaurus were recovered from the Langenberg Quarry, with about 1/3 bearing tooth marks. Of these tooth marks, the sizes and shapes match well with the teeth of small fish, crocodyliforms (such as Knoetschkesuchus) and sharks, but no confirmed theropod marks. The high number of individuals present suggests that a herd of Europasaurus was crossing a tidal zone and drowned. While the dominant large-bodied animal present is Europasaurus, there is also material from a diplodocid sauropod, a stegosaurian, and multiple theropods. Three cervicals of the diplodocid are preserved, and from their size it is possible that the taxon was also a dwarf. The stegosaurian and variety of theropods only preserve teeth, with the exception of a few bones possibly from a taxon in Ceratosauridae. Isolated teeth show that there were at least four different types of theropods present at the locality, including the megalosaurid Torvosaurus sp. as well as an additional megalosaurid and indeterminate members of the Allosauridae and Ceratosauria; and there are also the oldest teeth known from Velociraptorinae.

Besides the dinosaurs, many small-bodied terrestrial vertebrates are also preserved in the Langenberg quarry. Such animals include a well-preserved three-dimensional pterosaur skeleton from Dsungaripteridae, and isolated remains from Ornithocheiroidea and Ctenochasmatidae; a paramacellodid lizard; and partial skeletons and skulls from a relative of Theriosuchus now named as the genus Knoetschkesuchus. Teeth from dryolestid mammals are also preserved, as well as a docodont, a taxon in Eobaataridae, and a multituberculate with similarities to Proalbionbataar (now named Teutonodon).

=== Extinction ===
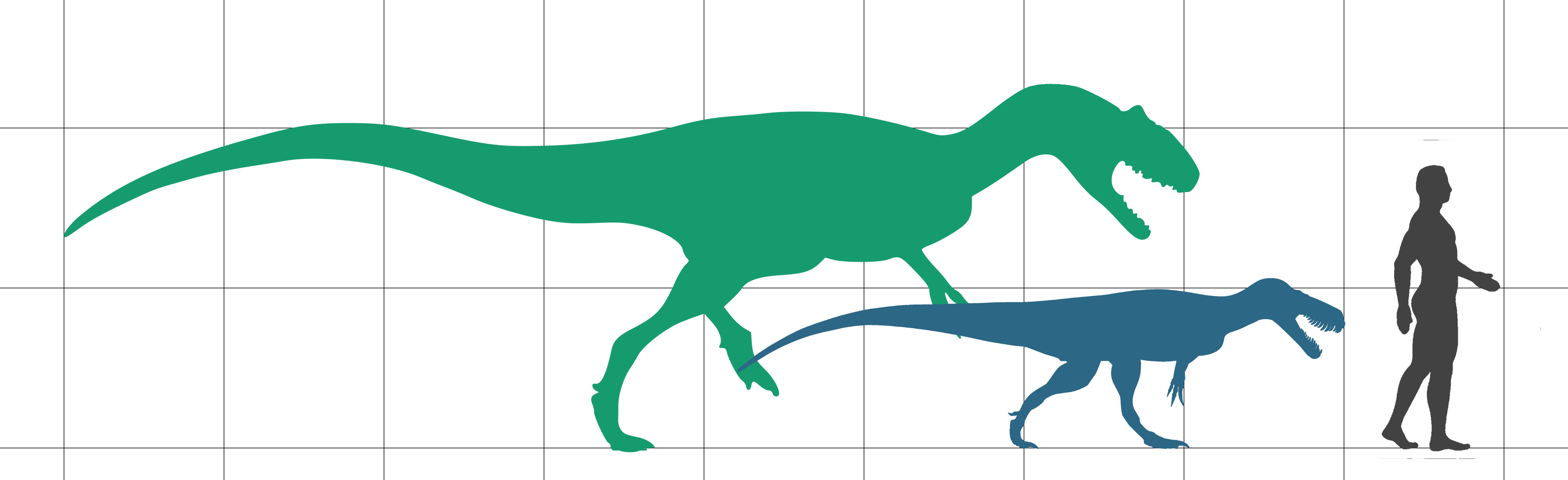
Size comparison of the native torvosaur (blue) and arriving theropod (green)

Dinosaur footprints preserved at the Langenberg Quarry display a possible reason for the extinction of Europasaurus, and potentially other insular dwarfs present on the islands of the region. The footprints are located 5 m (16 ft) above the deposit of Europasaurus individuals, which shows that at least 35,000 years after that deposit there was a drop in sea level which allowed for a faunal overturn. The inhabiting theropods of the island, that coexisted with Europasaurus, would have been about 4 m (13 ft), but the theropods that arrived over the land bridge preserve footprints up to 54 cm (21 in), which indicates a body size between 7 and 8 m (23 and 26 ft) if reconstructed as an allosaurian. It was suggested by the describers of these tracks (Jens Lallensack and colleagues), that these theropod taxa likely made the specialized dwarf fauna extinct, and the bed from which the footprints originated (Langenberg bed 92) is probably the youngest in which Europasaurus is present.
