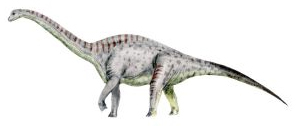
- Life restoration of Tastavinsaurus sanzi

Scientific classification
- Kingdom: Animalia
- Phylum: Chordata
- Class: Reptilia
- Clade: Dinosauria
- Clade: Saurischia
- Clade: †Sauropodomorpha
- Clade: †Sauropoda
- Clade: †Macronaria
- Clade: †Camarasauromorpha
- Branch: †Laurasiformes; Royo-Torres, 2009

Subgroups
- † Tastavinsaurus † Venenosaurus † Cedarosaurus

= Laurasiformes =

Laurasiformes Temporal range: Early Cretaceous, 130–99.6 Ma

Extinct clade of dinosaurs

Laurasiformes (meaning "Laurasian forms") is an extinct clade of sauropod dinosaurs from the late Early Cretaceous of Europe, North and South America. It was defined in 2009 by the Spanish paleontologist Rafael Royo-Torres as a clade containing sauropods more closely related to Tastavinsaurus than to Saltasaurus. Genera purported to form part of this clade include Aragosaurus, Galvesaurus, Phuwiangosaurus, Venenosaurus, Cedarosaurus, Tehuelchesaurus, Sonorasaurus and Tastavinsaurus.

Its exact position and validity is uncertain and varies between authors. A cladistics analysis found a similar grouping outside Titanosauriformes and basal within the Camarasauromorpha, while others have placed them inside Somphospondyli or Brachiosauridae, consequently, it has been suggested that Tehuelchesaurus along with others of the previously mentioned genera, form two different clades outside titanosauriformes (Carbadillo et al., 2011) while a more recent cladistics analysis found no support for the existence of the clade, with a revision of its supporting features finding them problematic due to being poorly defined, not present on most of the "laurasiforms" or being features present in many sauropods of other clades.
