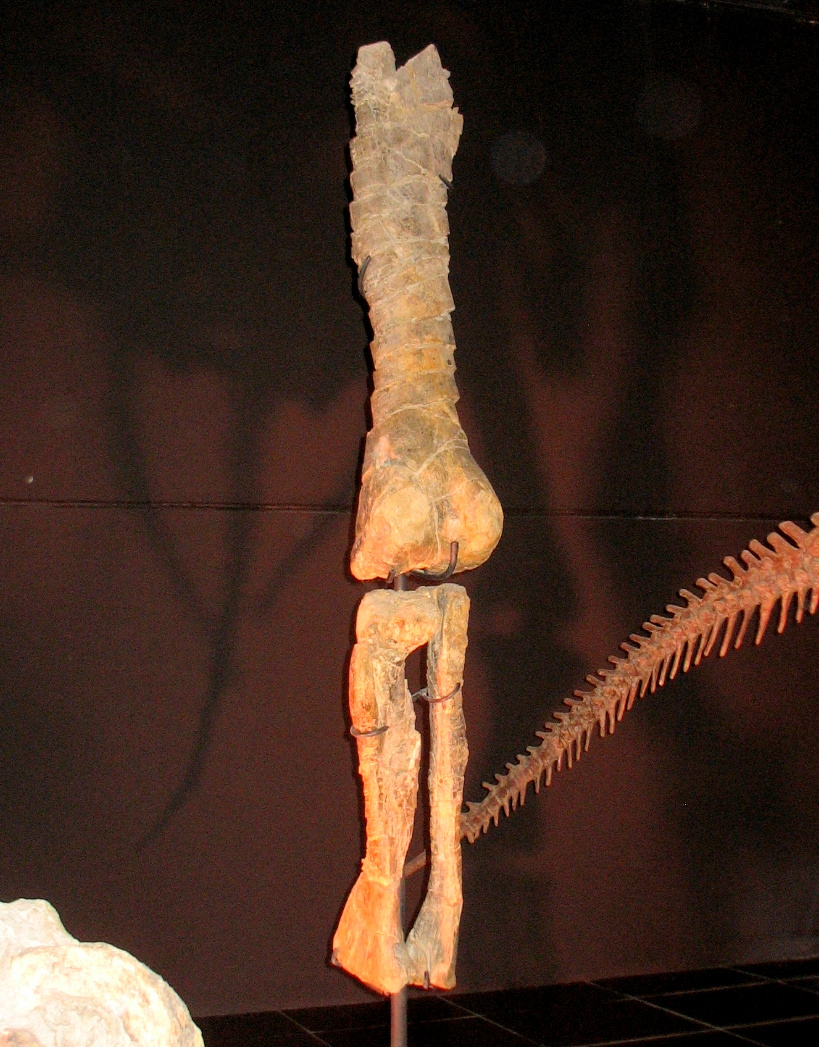
- Left hindlimb of the referred specimen CT-19

Scientific classification
- Kingdom: Animalia
- Phylum: Chordata
- Class: Reptilia
- Clade: Dinosauria
- Clade: Saurischia
- Clade: †Sauropodomorpha
- Clade: †Sauropoda
- Clade: †Macronaria
- Clade: †Camarasauromorpha
- Branch: †Laurasiformes
- Genus: †Tastavinsaurus; Canudo et al., 2008
- Species: †T. sanzi

Binomial name
- †Tastavinsaurus sanzi Canudo et al., 2008

= Tastavinsaurus =

Tastavinsaurus Temporal range: Early Barremian ~125 Ma

Extinct genus of dinosaurs

Tastavinsaurus is a genus of sauropod dinosaur belonging to the Titanosauriformes. It is based on a partial skeleton from the Early Cretaceous Xert Formation of Spain. The type species is Tastavinsaurus sanzi, named in honor of the Rio Tastavins in Spain and Spanish paleontologist José Luis Sanz. The genus is known from two specimens, one from the Xert Formation and one from the Forcall Formation. Tastavinsaurus was originally described as a somphospondylan, but it may be a brachiosaurid. The clade Laurasiformes was coined for Tastavinsaurus and its close relatives, which may include Cedarosaurus, Soriatitan, and Venenosaurus.

== Description ==
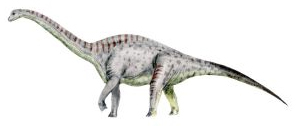
Restoration

The length of Tastavinsaurus sanzi has been estimated to be 16 metres (50 feet), and its weight has been estimated to be 8 tonnes. The caudal vertebrae are similar to those of other basal titanosauriforms, such as Cedarosaurus. The shin was proportionally shorter than in other sauropods, with the length of the tibia being only 55% of the length of the femur. Tastavinsaurus differed from its contemporary Europatitan in several characteristics of its vertebrae and hip bones, such as in having a pointed distal end of the pubis.
