= Galvesaurus =

Galvesaurus Temporal range: Tithonian, 150–146 Ma

Scientific classification
- Kingdom: Animalia
- Phylum: Chordata
- Class: Reptilia
- Clade: Dinosauria
- Clade: Saurischia
- Clade: †Sauropodomorpha
- Clade: †Sauropoda
- Clade: †Macronaria
- Family: †Brachiosauridae
- Genus: †Galvesaurus; Barco et al., 2005
- Species: †G. herreroi

Binomial name
- †Galvesaurus herreroi Barco et al., 2005

Synonyms
- Galveosaurus herreroi Sánchez Hernández, 2005

Extinct genus of dinosaurs

Galvesaurus, or Galveosaurus (meaning "Galve lizard"), is a genus of brachiosaurid sauropod dinosaur from the Late Jurassic period. Fossils of the only known species, G. herreroi, were found in Galve, Spain, hence its generic name. The specific name herreroi honours the discoverer, José María Herrero. Some researchers suggest that the taxon might represent a junior synonym of the Portuguese genus Lusotitan.

== Phylogeny ==
While Royo-Torres et al. (2006) grouped Galvesaurus within Turiasauria alongside Losillasaurus and Turiasaurus, Barco & Canudo (2012) noted that Galvesaurus lacks turiasaurian synapomorphies and found that it was actually a macronarian. A 2017 study suggested that it may represent a junior synonym of Lusotitan. New material described in 2019 reveals Galvesaurus to be a brachiosaurid, specifically as a sister taxon of Lusotitan. A 2024 phylogenetic analysis recovered it as a sister taxon of Titanosauriformes outside Brachiosauridae.

== History ==
During the 1980s, a fossil site known as Cuesta Lonsal, in the Kimmeridgian to Tithonian Villar del Arzobispo Formation near Galve (Teruel), Spain, was excavated by local amateur fossil hunter José María Herrero after he found the fossilized remains of a sauropod dinosaur. Zaragoza University and the Government of Aragón commissioned members of a scientific research team known as "Aragosaurus" to investigate the site in 1987. They determined that the site would be an important one for paleontological research, and after obtaining the necessary permits, they began their own dig there in 1993. Between 1993 and 2002, they obtained more than 50 bones associated with a new sauropod species. Also during that time, various team members published scientific reports on the bones they were recovering and on the site itself, though they refrained from publishing a formal name for the new dinosaur due to the fact the fossils were still undergoing preparation. As the bones were prepared and studied, the team transferred them to the small Spanish Paleontological Museum of Galve for display.

=== Naming controversy ===
The description of the sauropod from Galve was not as straightforward as is typical for most dinosaurs. Problems arose when the same specimen, housed at the Museo Paleontológico de Galve, was studied and published almost simultaneously by two groups of scientists, both of whom were supposedly unaware the other was studying exactly the same bones, the holotype material.

The name Galveosaurus herreroi, was first published in a paper by Bárbara Sánchez Hernandez on August 11, 2005, based on a partial skeleton housed in the Spanish Paleontological Museum of Galve. At the same time, several members of the Aragosaurus team; Jose Luis Barco, Jose Ignacio Canudo, Gloria Cuenca Bescós and Jose Ignacio Ruíz Omeñaca, had been preparing a paper on the new sauropod, including the same specimen, elements of which had been in preparation since 1993. Barco et al. published their own description of the sauropod, which they named Galvesaurus herreroi (note the lack of the letter "o"), in the journal Naturaleza Aragonesa. The date given in the journal, labelled as the July–December 2005 issue, was July 1st, 2005. If that date was correct, the valid name for this dinosaur would be Galvesaurus herreroi, and attributed to Barco et al. rather than to Sánchez Hernández. However, according to Sánchez Hernández, the date the authors provided is contradicted by the date of publication listed for the journal as a whole (July–December, 2005). Sánchez Hernández pointed to ICZN article 21.6 and 23, and claimed the publication date of Barco et al. (2005) is technically considered to be December 31, 2005, the last date of the given range. Therefore, according to Sánchez Hernández, Galveosaurus herreroi is the valid name for this species. The Aragosaurus team disputed this, saying that the date given at the end of their paper, July 1, 2005, being within the given July–December range of the journal, was not contradictory and therefore was not sufficient to invoke the ICZN rules. Sánchez Hernández argued that the actual date the journal was published was December 18, 2005, and used the fact that her name Galveosaurus was already in widespread use online as evidence that her paper was first to publication.

In addition to the controversy over the priority of the name itself, the Aragosaurus team raised concerns about the professional ethics involved in Sánchez Hernández's publication. According to Barco and Canudo, "The International Commission on Zoological Nomenclature provides for a rather similar case in its ethical code, which stipulates that a researcher should not publish a taxon if he or she suspects that there is someone else already working on defining it (where the two of them are studying different specimens). In no case does the Commission even contemplate the possibility that a researcher might define a taxon on the basis of the same material, i.e. of the same specimen, as is already being studied by other investigators, as has been the case with Galvesaurus. The episode will doubtless come to be considered an example of bad practice in the development of research in Palaeontology, since a lack of awareness cannot be invoked." The Aragosaurus team have alleged that Sánchez Hernández must have known other scientists were currently working on the Galve sauropod specimen at the time she published her paper, and note that she even cited one of their previous research papers on the fossil material. Furthermore, Canudo has claimed that Sánchez Hernández did not have professional access to the fossils, but simply went to the museum and took photos of the bones on display for use in her paper. The Aragosaurus team cited the name itself as evidence for this claim. The museum staff, they alleged, had known for a long time about the work being done on the specimen and the name the team intended to use. According to Barco and Canudo, the museum added a plaque to the fossil display with their intended name but included an inadvertent misspelling, with the extra "o". Barco and Canudo alleged that Sánchez Hernández must have copied the plaque to obtain such a similar name to the one they published, which explains the slightly variant spelling. Canudo also stated that the wood frame of the display cabinet is visible in one of the photos in Sánchez Hernández's paper, demonstrating that she did not have first-hand access to the specimen and instead relied on the public museum display.
