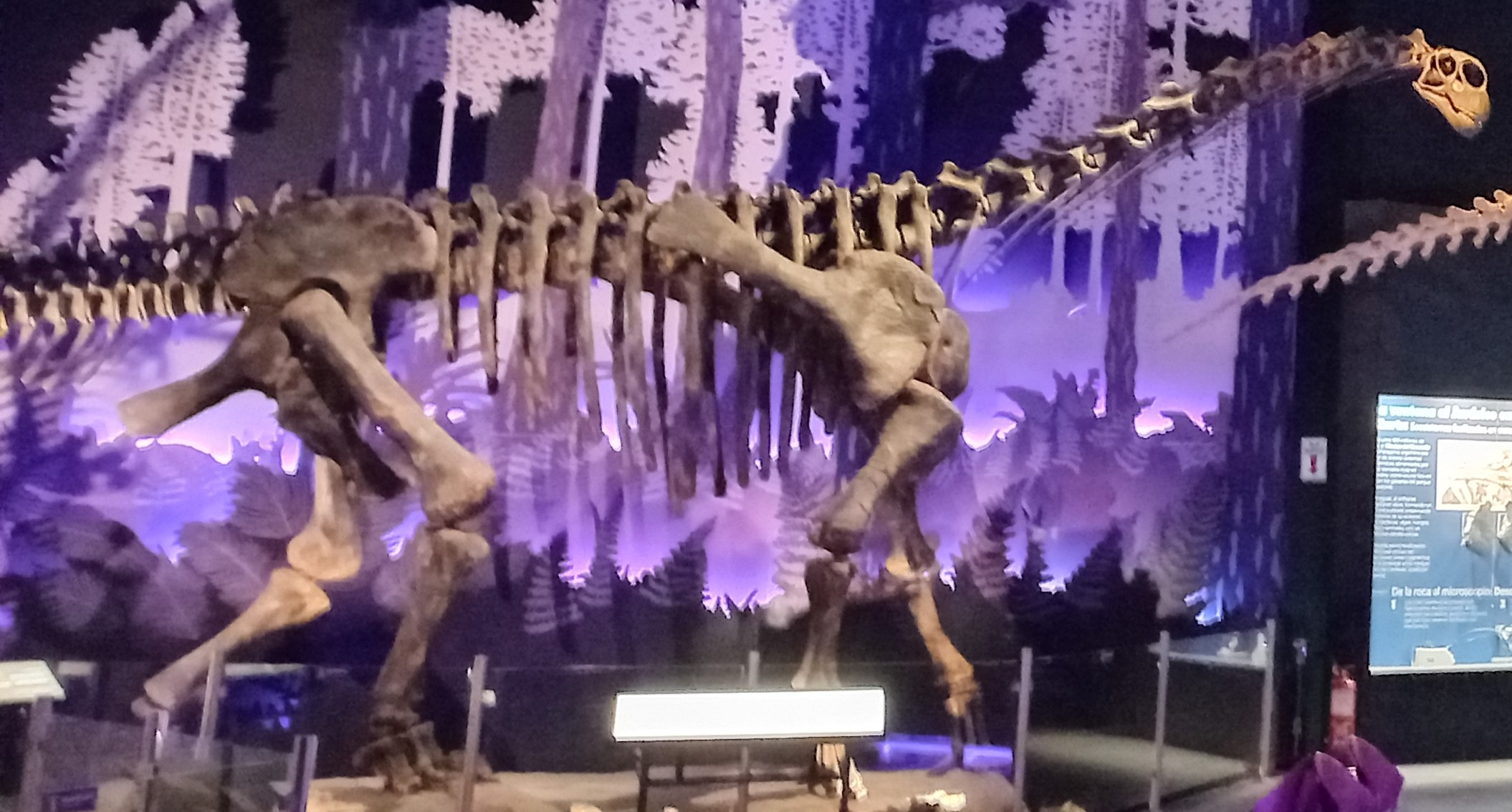
- Reconstructed skeleton on display at the MEF in Trelew, Argentina

Scientific classification
- Kingdom: Animalia
- Phylum: Chordata
- Class: Reptilia
- Clade: Dinosauria
- Clade: Saurischia
- Clade: †Sauropodomorpha
- Clade: †Sauropoda
- Clade: †Macronaria
- Family: †Camarasauridae
- Genus: †Tehuelchesaurus; Rich et al. 1999
- Species: †T. benitezii

Binomial name
- †Tehuelchesaurus benitezii Rich et al. 1999

= Tehuelchesaurus =

Tehuelchesaurus Temporal range: Oxfordian-Tithonian ~160–150 Ma

Extinct genus of dinosaurs

Tehuelchesaurus (/teɪhwɛltʃeɪsɔːrəs/) is a genus of macronarian or turiasaurian sauropod dinosaur from the Late Jurassic (Oxfordian to Tithonian) of Argentina. It is named in honor of the Tehuelche people, native to the Argentinian province of Chubut, where it was first found.

== Description ==
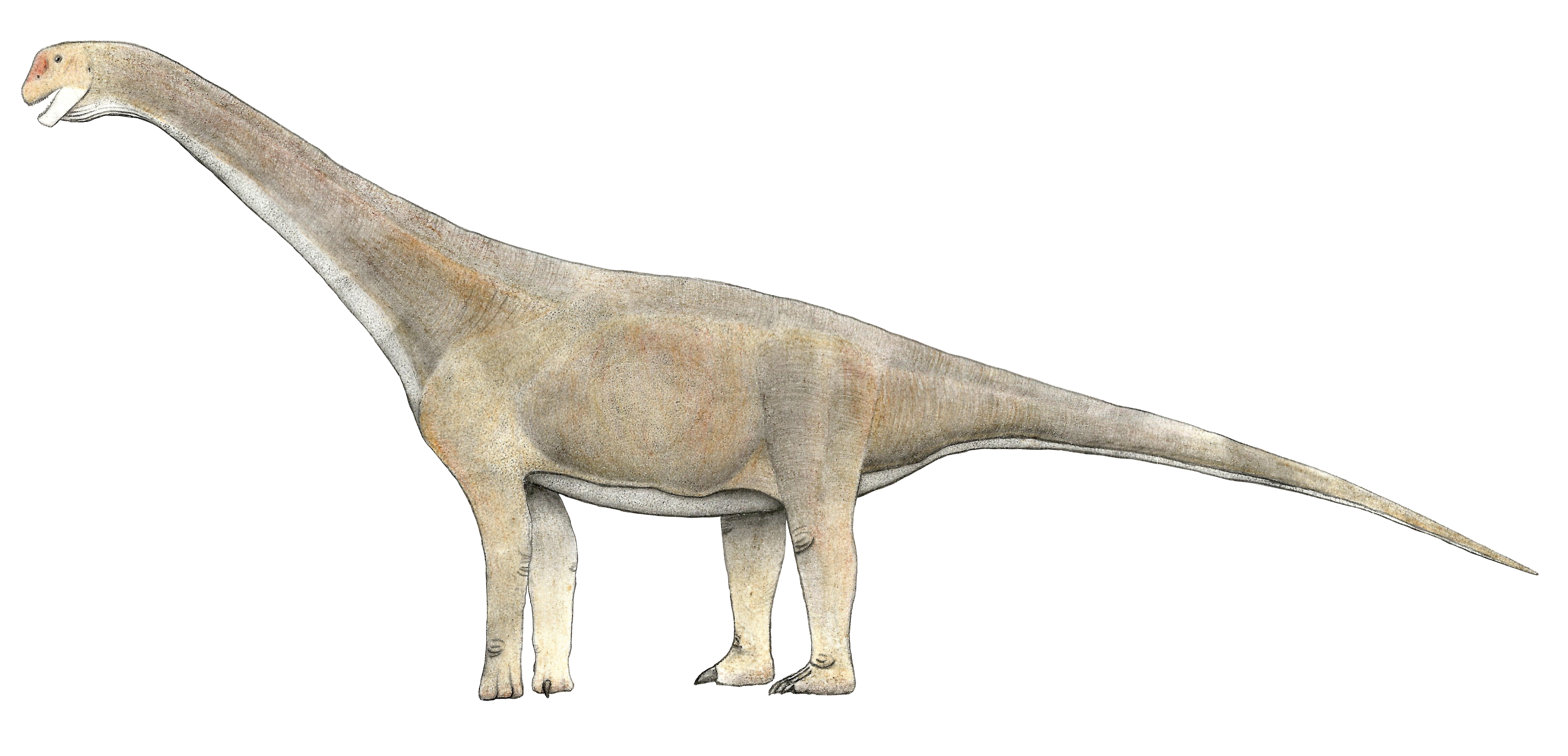
Life restoration

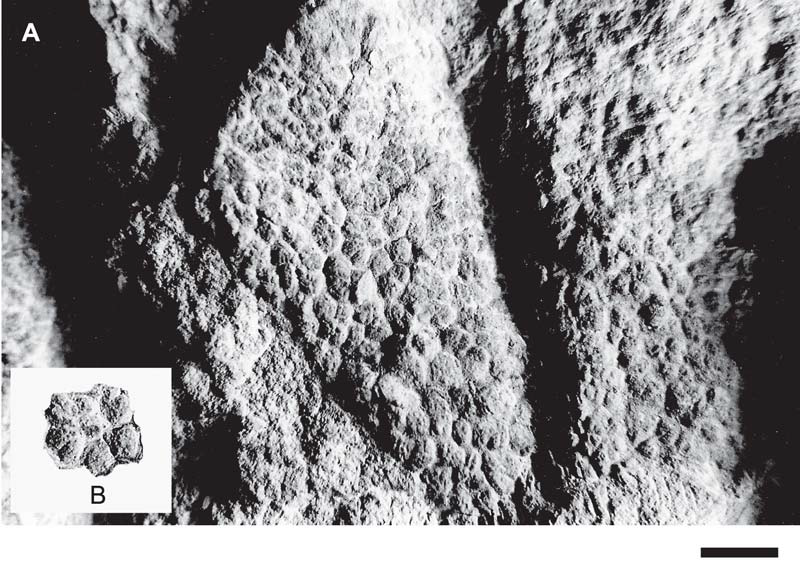
Skin impressions of Tehuelchesaurus. Skin patch with small tuberculated scales. (Scale bar: 1 cm).

It was a moderately large (possibly 15 metres (49 ft) long) cetiosaur-like sauropod found in the Late Jurassic (Tithonian) Cañadon Calcareo Formation at Fernandez Estancia, Chubut Province, Patagonia, Argentina; known from the holotype MPEF-PV 1125 (Museo Paleontologico Egidio Fergulio), a 50% complete skeleton, lacking a skull, but including dorsal, sacral and caudal vertebrae, parts of the forelimbs and hindlimbs, parts of the shoulder girdle and pelvis, some rib fragments, and skin impressions.

Tehuelchesaurus is most similar to Omeisaurus from the Middle Jurassic of China, but is distinguished by the shape of the coracoid, the stouter radius and ulna, and the shapes of the pubis and ischium; all the dorsal vertebrae have pseudopleurocoels (deep depressions in the centra but without internal chambers) and opisthocoelous centra, unlike in Barapasaurus and Patagosaurus. The length of the entire neck and tail are not known, but based on other proportions (humerus 1.14 metres (3.7 ft) long; femur 1.53 metres (5.0 ft) long; scapula 1.75 metres (5.7 ft) long; ischium 1.01 metres (3.3 ft) long; ilium 1.12 metres (3.7 ft); pubis 94.3 centimetres (37.1 in) long), Tehuelchesaurus was probably about 15 metres (49 ft) long. It was named by Rich, Vickers-Rich, Gimenez, Cuneo, Puerta & Vacca in 1999. The type species is Tehuelchesaurus benitezii (/beɪnitɛziaɪ/), named after Aldo Benitez, who discovered the holotype.

An equal weights analysis of Eusauropoda by Mannion et al. (2019) found that Tehuelchesaurus was a basal member of Turiasauria.
