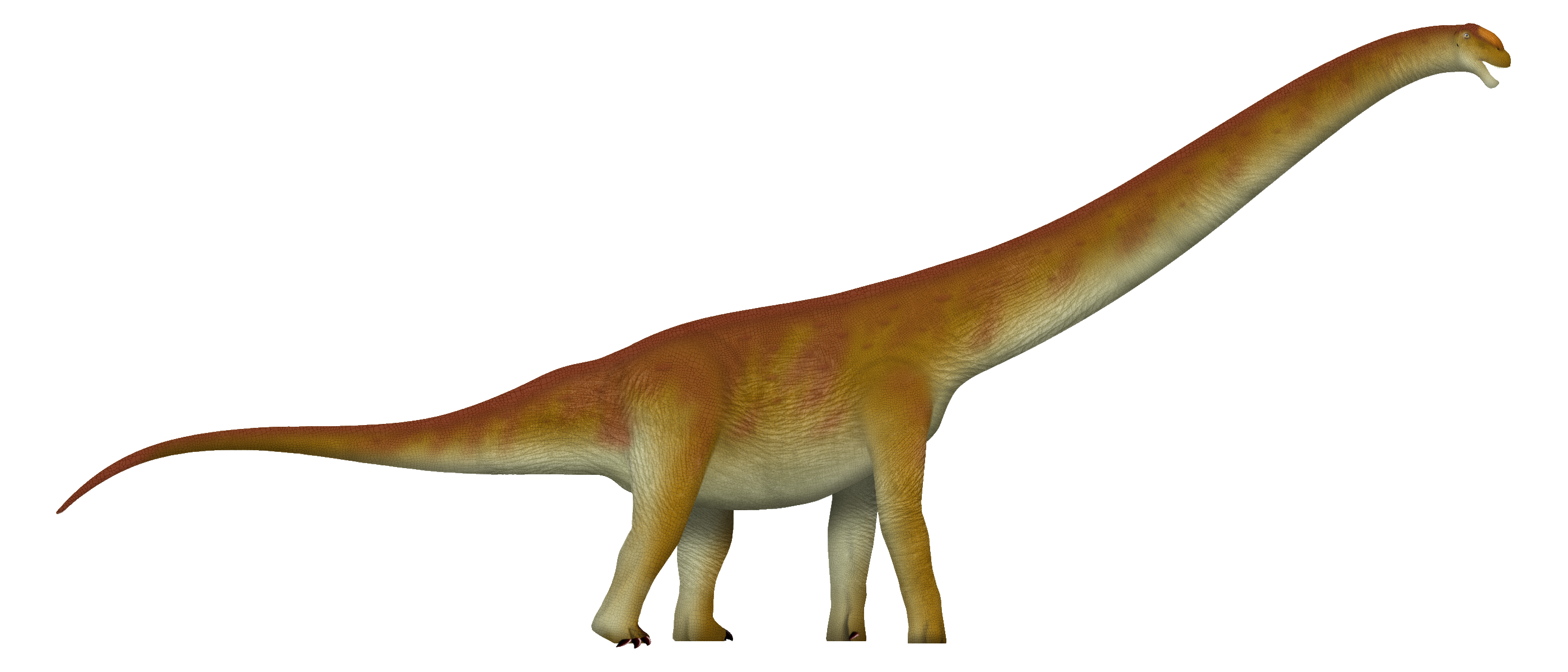
- Life restoration as a titanosaur

Scientific classification
- Kingdom: Animalia
- Phylum: Chordata
- Class: Reptilia
- Clade: Dinosauria
- Clade: Saurischia
- Clade: †Sauropodomorpha
- Clade: †Sauropoda
- Clade: †Macronaria
- Clade: †Somphospondyli
- Genus: †Jiangxititan; Mo et al., 2023
- Species: †J. ganzhouensis

Binomial name
- †Jiangxititan ganzhouensis Mo et al., 2023

= Jiangxititan =

Jiangxititan Temporal range: Late Cretaceous, Maastrichtian

Genus of somphospondylan sauropod dinosaurs

Jiangxititan is an extinct genus of somphospondylan titanosauriform dinosaur from the Upper Cretaceous Nanxiong Formation of China. The genus contains a single species, J. ganzhouensis, known from several articulated vertebrae with ribs. Originally described as a titanosaur, Jiangxititan was later suggested to be a non-titanosaurian somphospondylan.

== Discovery and naming ==
The Jiangxititan holotype specimen, NHMG 034062, was discovered in sediments of the Nanxiong Formation near Tankou Town in Ganzhou City of Jiangxi Province, southern China. The specimen consists of the three posteriormost cervical vertebrae with two cervical ribs, articulated with the first four dorsal vertebrae with three dorsal ribs.

In 2023, Mo et al. described Jiangxititan ganzhouensis as a new genus and species of macronarian sauropod based on these fossil remains. The generic name, "Jiangxititan", combines a reference to the type locality in Jiangxi Province with the word "titan", a common suffix for giant sauropod names, referencing the pre-Olympian gods of Greek mythology. The specific name, "ganzhouensis", references the discovery of the fossil in Ganzhou City.

== Classification ==
Mo et al. (2023) recovered Jiangxititan as a derived member of the titanosaurian clade Lognkosauria, as the sister taxon to Mongolosaurus. The results of their phylogenetic analyses are shown in the cladogram below:

- Titanosauria
  - Diamantinasauria
  - - - Xianshanosaurus
      - Daxiatitan
      - Australodocus
    - Lithostrotia
      - Malawisaurus
      - - - - Aeolosaurus
            - Rapetosaurus
          - - Isisaurus
            - Saltasaurus
            - - Opisthocoelicaudia
              - Alamosaurus
        - - Epachthosaurus
          - - - Pitekunsaurus
              - - Tapuiasaurus
                - - Antarctosaurus
                  - - Vahiny
                    - Jainosaurus
            - - Normanniasaurus
              - Rinconsaurus
              - Muyelensaurus
              - Nemegtosaurus
              - Lognkosauria
                - Mendozasaurus
                - Argentinosaurus
                - Futalognkosaurus
                - - Patagotitan
                  - Notocolossus
                  - - Puertasaurus
                    - - Jiangxititan
                      - Mongolosaurus

A subsequent analysis by Han and colleagues in 2024 recovered Jiangxititan as a non-titanosaurian somphospondylan, in a polytomy with several other basal somphospondylans. Removing Jiangxititan as an unstable operational taxonomic unit in their analyses allowed for increased resolution, with more taxa recovered in the Euhelopodidae. The reduced consensus tree from their phylogenetic analyses is shown in the cladogram below:

- Titanosauriformes
  - Brachiosauridae
  - Somphospondyli
    - - Astrophocaudia
      - - Brontomerus
        - Malarguesaurus
        - Paluxysaurus
    - - Angolatitan
      - Chubutisaurus
      - Cloverly titanosauriform
      - Fukuititan
      - Gobititan
      - Jiangxititan
      - - Ruixinia
        - Jiangshanosaurus
      - - Europatitan
        - Tastavinsaurus
      - - Ligabuesaurus
        - Dongbeititan
      - - - Tangvayosaurus
          - Phuwiangosaurus
        - - Qiaowanlong
          - - Yongjinglong
            - Euhelopus
      - - Huanghetitan spp.
        - - Diamantinasauria
          - Titanosauria
