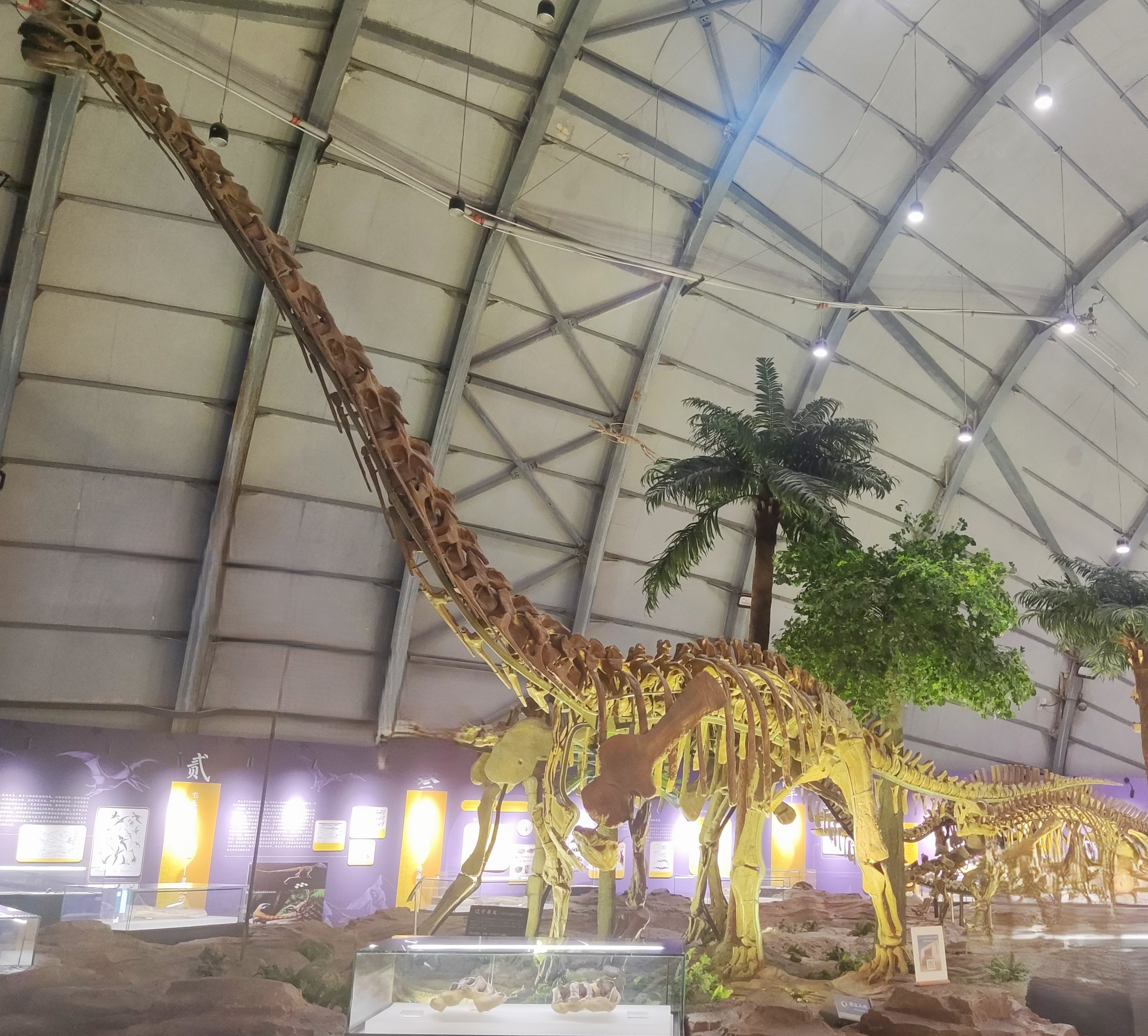
- Skeletal mount, Liaoning Palaeontological Museum

Scientific classification
- Kingdom: Animalia
- Phylum: Chordata
- Class: Reptilia
- Clade: Dinosauria
- Clade: Saurischia
- Clade: †Sauropodomorpha
- Clade: †Sauropoda
- Clade: †Macronaria
- Family: †Euhelopodidae
- Genus: †Liaoningotitan; Zhou et al., 2018
- Species: †L. sinensis

Binomial name
- †Liaoningotitan sinensis Zhou et al., 2018

= Liaoningotitan =

Liaoningotitan Temporal range: Early Cretaceous, Barremian

Extinct genus of reptiles

Liaoningotitan (meaning "Liaoning giant") is a genus of titanosauriform sauropod from the Early Cretaceous (Barremian) Yixian Formation in Liaoning, China. A redescription of the holotype proposed affinities of Liaoningotitan with the Euhelopodidae.

== Description ==
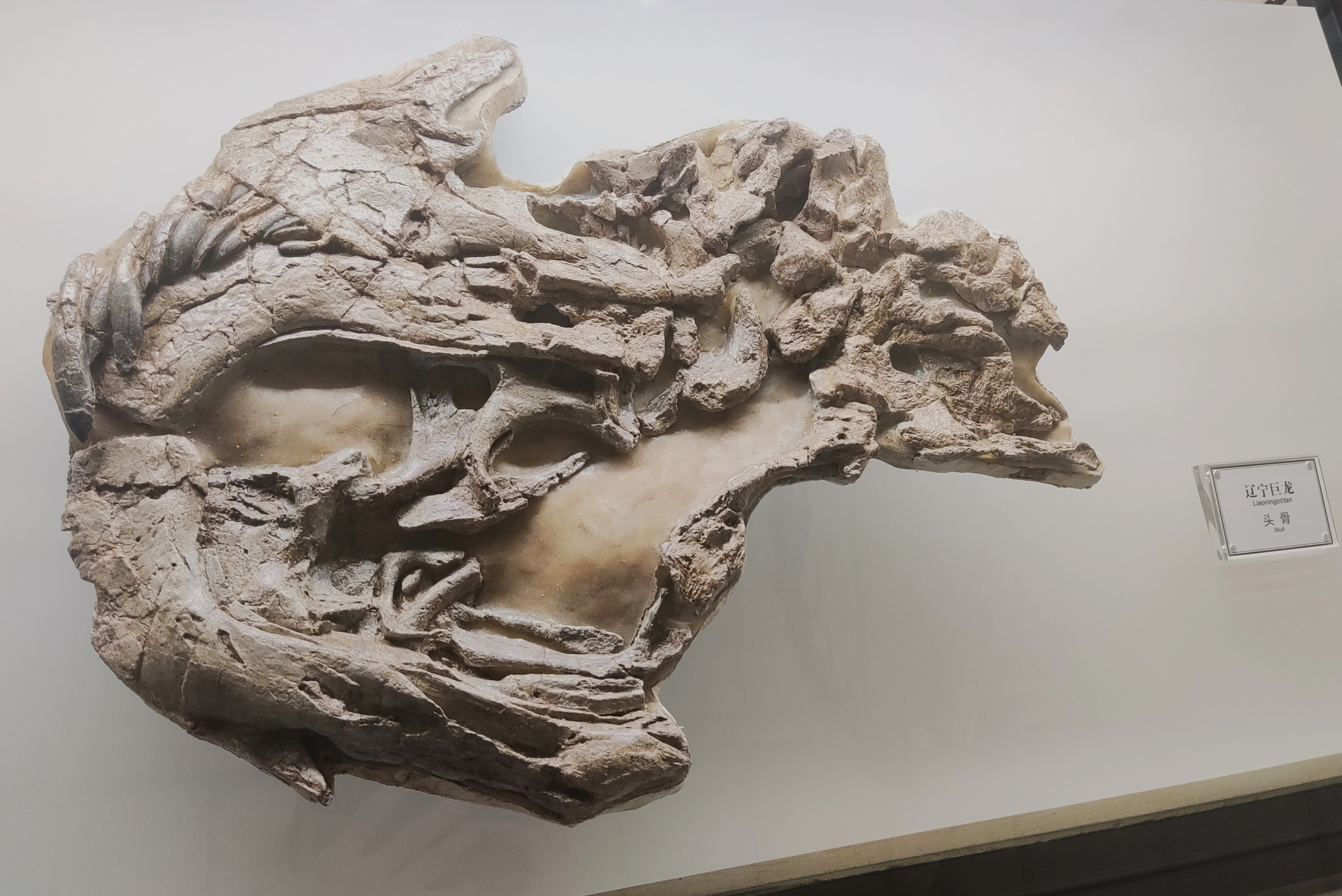
Partial skull

Fossil skeleton, Chaoyang Paleontological Museum

Liaoningotitan is a medium-sized sauropod, with an estimated body length of 10 metres (33 ft) and shoulder height of 2 metres (6.6 ft) based on comparisons with the closely related Euhelopus. Distinguishing features of Liaoningotitan include a ventral margin of the maxilla that is convex, an upper tooth row that is short and anteriorly positioned; an anterior extension of the jugal that nearly reaches the level of the anterior margin of the antorbital fenestra; a basally constricted quadrate wing of the pterygoid; imbricated upper teeth, with narrow spatulate crowns that are D-shaped in cross section, and no labial grooves or denticles; nine reduced and un-imbricated lower teeth; asymmetric lower tooth crowns which are elliptical-like in cross section, with lingual grooves and ridges and a lingually bulbous basal crown; a proximal expansion of the humerus that is about 54.9% the length of the humerus; and an ilium with a pointed preacetabular process.

== Classification ==
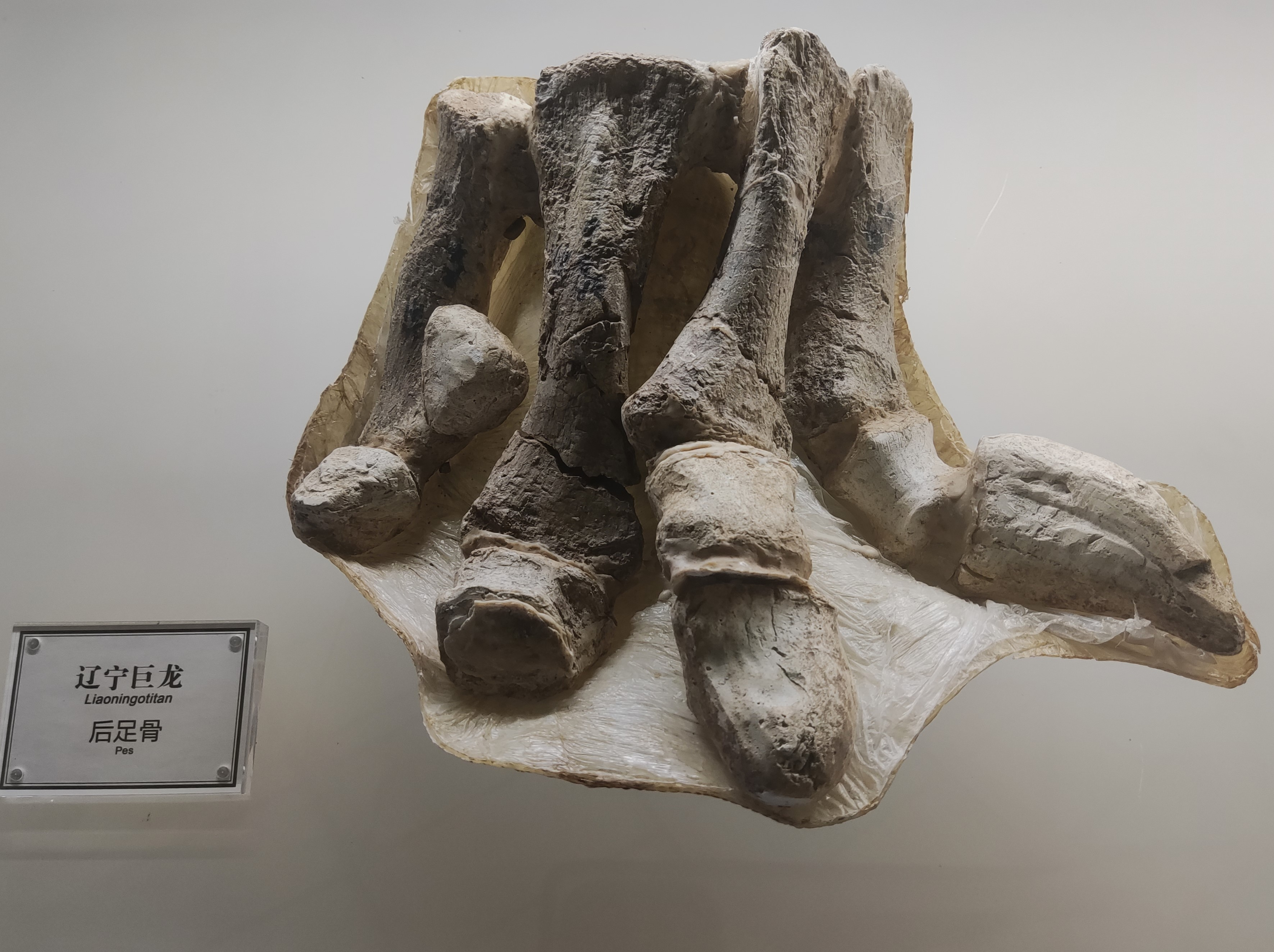
Hand bones

Zhou et al. (2018) recovered Liaoningotitan as a somphospondylan titanosauriform more derived than Euhelopus. In 2022, Mo et al. found Liaoningotitan to be an unstable taxon that may be closely related to Diamantinasaurus and Baotianmansaurus. In a 2025 redescription of the holotype specimen, Bingqing Shan proposed that Liaoningotitan was a member of the Euhelopodidae, as the sister taxon to Yongjinglong. These results are displayed in the cladogram below:

- Titanosauriformes
  - Lusotitan
  - - Fusuisaurus
    - - Brachiosauridae
      - Somphospondyli
        - Euhelopodidae
          - Qiaowanlong
          - Liubangosaurus
          - Gobititan
          - Euhelopus
          - Australodocus
          - Astrophocaudia
          - - Tangvayosaurus
            - Phuwiangosaurus
          - - Jiangshanosaurus
            - - Liaoningotitan
              - Yongjinglong
        - - - Tastavinsaurus
            - - Europatitan
              - Baotianmansaurus
          - - Chubutisaurus
            - - Fukuititan
              - - - Ligabuesaurus
                  - Dongbeititan
                - - Sauroposeidon
                  - Paluxysaurus
                  - Malarguesaurus
                  - Cloverly titanosauriform
                  - Brontomerus
              - - Diamantinasauria
                - - Huanghetitan liujiaxiaensis
                  - Angolatitan
                  - - Huanghetitan ruyangensis
                    - Titanosauria

== Paleoecology ==
Liaoningotitan is one of three titanosauriforms from the Yixian Formation of Liaoning, the others being Dongbeititan and Ruixinia. These forms co-existed with feathered dinosaurs in the Early Cretaceous lacustrine environment of present-day Liaoning.
