= Ruixinia =

Ruixinia Temporal range: Early Cretaceous (Barremian), ~125 Ma

Scientific classification
- Kingdom: Animalia
- Phylum: Chordata
- Class: Reptilia
- Clade: Dinosauria
- Clade: Saurischia
- Clade: †Sauropodomorpha
- Clade: †Sauropoda
- Clade: †Macronaria
- Clade: †Somphospondyli
- Genus: †Ruixinia; Mo et al., 2022
- Species: †R. zhangi

Binomial name
- †Ruixinia zhangi Mo et al., 2022

Genus of sauropod dinosaurs

Ruixinia is an extinct genus of somphospondylan sauropod dinosaur from the Early Cretaceous (Barremian) Yixian Formation of China. The genus contains a single species, Ruixinia zhangi, known from a partial articulated skeleton. This specimen preserves the most complete series of caudal vertebrae known from any Asian titanosauriform.

== Discovery and naming ==
The Ruixinia holotype specimen, ELDM EL-J009, was found in sediments of the Yixian Formation in Beipiao, Liaoning Province, northeastern China. This locality is dated to the Barremian age of the Early Cretaceous period. The fossil material consists of a partial articulated skeleton including cervical (neck), dorsal (back), and sacral vertebrae, caudal (tail) vertebrae and associated chevrons, dorsal ribs, and a left ilium, pubis, femur, tibia, astragalus, metatarsal V, and possible pedal phalanx. At the time of its description, the fossil material was still partially embedded in matrix, with only the left side of the bones prepared.

In 2022, Ruixinia zhangi was described as a new genus and species of titanosaurian dinosaurs by Jinyou Mo, Feimin Ma, Yilun Yu, and Xing Xu. The binomial honors Ruixin Zhang, a contributor to the Erlianhaote Dinosaur Museum.

== Description ==
Ruixinia was a mid-sized sauropod, with an estimated length of approximately 12 meters.

The neck of Ruixinia was over 4 meters long and consisted of at least 15 cervical vertebrae. Such a high number of cervical vertebrae is similar to Dongbeititan, Euhelopus, and Mamenchisaurus.

The tail of Ruixinia contained at least 52 vertebrae. The last few vertebrae were fused together, an unusual trait in sauropods otherwise only known to occur in some Jurassic Asian sauropods such as Shunosaurus and Mamenchisaurus. However, the structure of the fused vertebrae differs between the three taxa. In Ruixinia, the fused vertebrae form a rodlike structure.

The chevrons are distinctive, particularly that of the 20th caudal vertebra, which has a pentagonal shape.

== Classification ==
Mo et al. (2022) recovered Ruixinia to be a basal titanosaur, placed as the sister taxon to a clade containing Daxiatitan and Xianshanosaurus. However, both Daxiatitan and Xianshanosaurus have also been suggested to have affinities with mamenchisaurids, and Mo et al. noted several similarities between Ruixinia and Mamenchisaurus. Ruixinia was not found to be closely related to either of its contemporaries, Dongbeititan or Liaoningotitan. The cladogram below displays the results of the phylogenetic analyses of Mo et al. (2022).

- Titanosauriformes
  - Brachiosauridae
  - Somphospondyli
    - - Huanghetitan spp.
      - - - Ligabuesaurus
          - Dongbeititan
        - - Savannasaurus
          - - Chubutisaurus
            - Angolatitan
      - - Europatitan
        - Tastavinsaurus
        - - Liubangosaurus
          - - Euhelopodidae
            - - Jiangshanosaurus
              - Titanosauria
                - - Tambatitanis
                  - - Huabeisaurus
                    - Dongyangosaurus
                    - Andesaurus
                - - Mongolosaurus
                  - - - Vahiny
                      - Jainosaurus
                    - - Ruyangosaurus
                      - - - Ruixinia
                          - - Xianshanosaurus
                            - Daxiatitan
                        - - - Rinconsaurus
                            - Muyelensaurus
                          - - - Mendozasaurus
                              - - - Argentinosaurus
                                  - Futalognkosaurus
                                - - Puertasaurus
                                  - - Patagotitan
                                    - Notocolossus
                            - - Lithostrotia

In their 2024 description of the basal titanosaur Gandititan, Han et al. included Ruixinia in their phylogenetic analyses, recovering it as a member of the Euhelopodidae, rather than the Titanosauria, as the sister taxon to Jiangshanosaurus. The results of their phylogenetic analyses are shown in the cladogram below:

- Titanosauriformes
  - Brachiosauridae
  - Somphospondyli
    - - Astrophocaudia
      - - Brontomerus
        - Malarguesaurus
        - Paluxysaurus
    - - - - Europatitan
          - Tastavinsaurus
        - - Fukuititan
          - - - Dongbeititan
              - Ligabuesaurus
            - - Angolatitan
              - - Chubutisaurus
                - Cloverly titanosauriform
      - - Euhelopodidae
          - Gobititan
          - - - Jiangshanosaurus
              - Ruixinia
            - - - Phuwiangosaurus
                - Tangvayosaurus
              - - Qiaowanlong
                - - Euhelopus
                  - Yongjinglong
        - - Huanghetitan spp.
          - - Diamantinasauria
            - Titanosauria
              - - Andesaurus
                - Baotianmansaurus
                - Dongyangosaurus
                - Huabeisaurus
                - - Abdarainurus
                  - Gandititan
              - - - Daxiatitan
                  - Xianshanosaurus
                - - Ruyangosaurus
                  - - Lithostrotia

In 2025, Averianov and colleagues reassessed the phylogenetic relationships of Tengrisaurus and other early titanosaurs and allied taxa. They proposed that the initial interpretation of Ruixinia as a non-lithostrotian titanosaur was supported based on the anatomy of the anterior caudal vertebrae, and since this region of the skeleton is not preserved in undisputed euhelopodids. Their phylogenetic analysis including Ruixinia placed it within Titanosauria, diverging immediately after a clade similar to the one including Andesaurus and Gandititan as found by Han et al. (2024).

== Paleoecology ==
Ruixinia is a member of the Jehol Biota. Two other sauropod genera, Dongbeititan and Liaoningotitan, are also known from the Jehol Biota.
