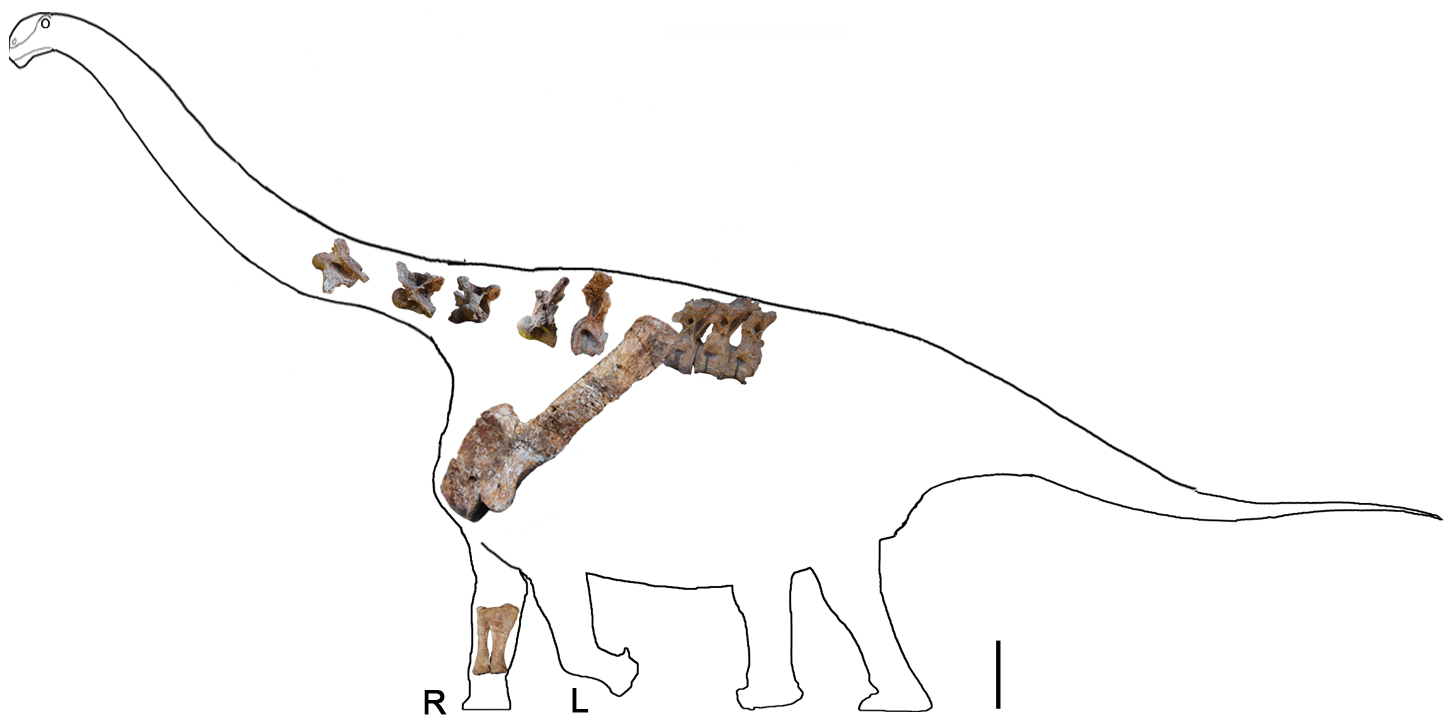
- Holotype fossils

Scientific classification
- Kingdom: Animalia
- Phylum: Chordata
- Class: Reptilia
- Clade: Dinosauria
- Clade: Saurischia
- Clade: †Sauropodomorpha
- Clade: †Sauropoda
- Clade: †Macronaria
- Family: †Euhelopodidae
- Genus: †Yongjinglong; Li et al., 2014

Type species
- †Yongjinglong datangi Li et al., 2014

= Yongjinglong =

Yongjinglong Temporal range: Albian Early Cretaceous

Extinct genus of dinosaurs

Yongjinglong is an extinct genus of titanosauriform sauropod dinosaur known from the Early Cretaceous of Lanzhou-Minhe Basin of Gansu Province, China. It contains a single species, Yongjinglong datangi.

== Discovery ==
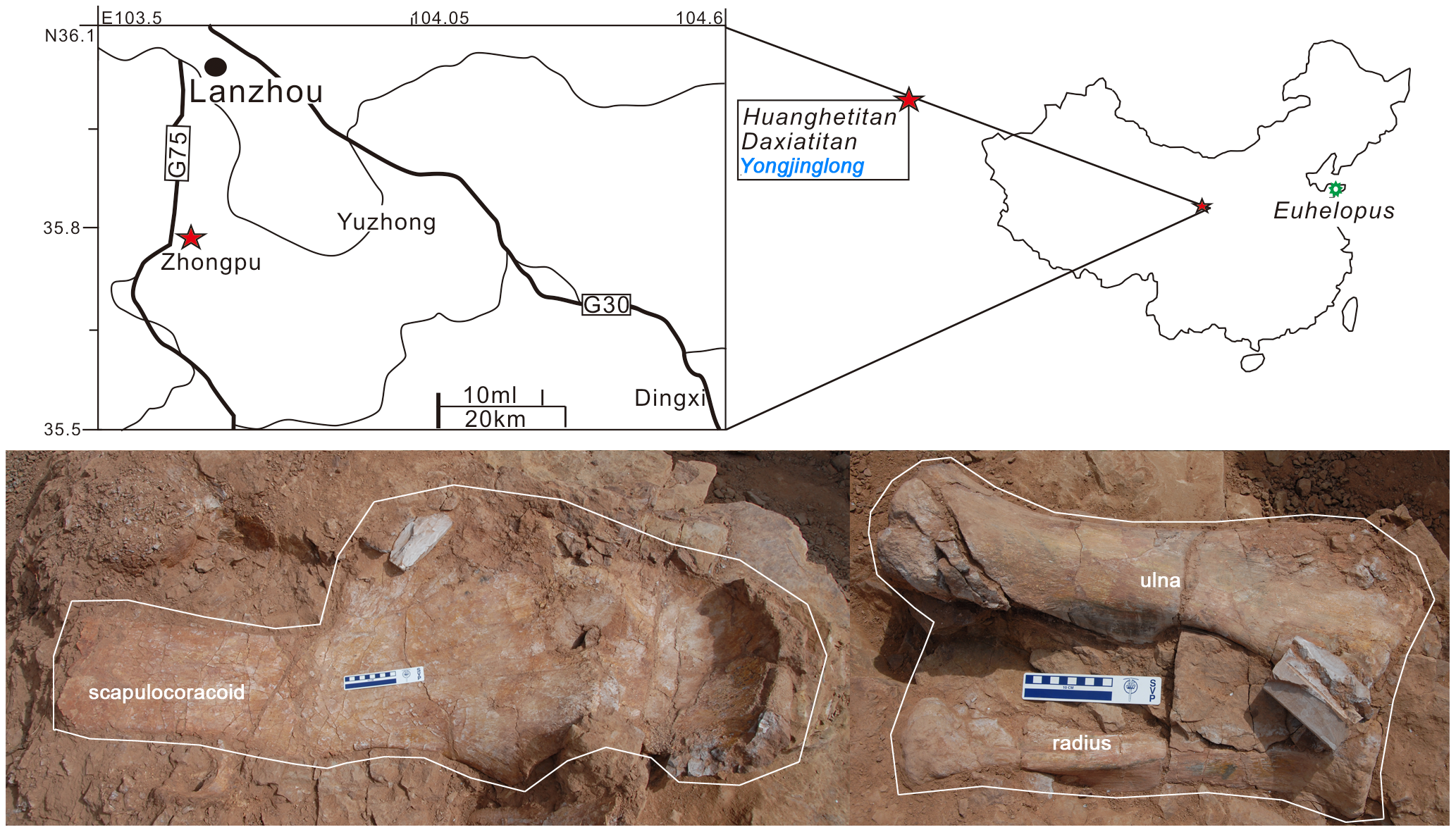
Quarry map and fossils in situ

Yongjinglong was first described and named by Li-Guo Li, Da-Qing Li, Hai-Lu You and Peter Dodson in 2014 and the type species is Yongjinglong datangi. The generic name is derived from the name of the historical Yongjing County, near where the holotype of Yongjinglong and numerous dinosaur track fossils were collected, and from long, meaning "dragon" in Chinese. The specific name, datangi, honors the Tang dynasty and also Mr. Zhi-Lu Tang from the IVPP, for his contributions to the study of dinosaurs.

Yongjinglong is known solely from the holotype GSGM ZH(08)-04, a partial postcranial skeleton and three teeth, currently housed at the Gansu Geological Museum, Gansu Province. The postcranial remains include one fragmentary dorsal rib, the left scapulocoracoid, the right ulna and radius, as well as eight presacral vertebrae including one caudal cervical vertebra, four cranial dorsal vertebrae, and three articulated middle dorsal vertebrae. It represents a subadult individual. GSGM ZH(08)-04 was by Li Daqing and You Hailu discovered in 2008 beside the G75 Highway, less than a kilometer from the quarries of Daxiatitan and Huanghetitan liujiaxiaensis, near Zhongpu. It was collected from the upper Hekou Group, in the southeastern part of the Lanzhou-Minhe Basin, Gansu Province, dating to the Early Cretaceous.

== Description ==
Yongjinglong was a medium-sized sauropod. The describers established some diagnostic traits. The premaxillary teeth are long and spoon-shaped. The neck vertebrae and anterior dorsal vertebrae possess large and deep pleurocoels, pneumatic depressions, that cover the entire sides of the centra. The ridges on the sides of the middle dorsal vertebrae form a pattern shaped like a "XI", with the "X" in front. The spine of at least one middle dorsal vertebra is low and not bifurcated and forms with the postzygapophyses a triangular bone plate, directed upwards. The shoulder blade is extremely long, with, in side view, exceptionally straight front and rear edges.

== Phylogeny ==
Yongjinglong was placed in the Titanosauria by Li et al. (2014). Their cladistic analysis showed it was a member of the Somphospondyli and a sister species of Opisthocoelicaudia. However, a 2019 revision of Chinese "titanosaurs" resolved Yongjinglong deeply nested within Euhelopodidae, sister taxon to Huanghetitan and Ruyangosaurus, or a clade including Euhelopus, Erketu and Gobititan.

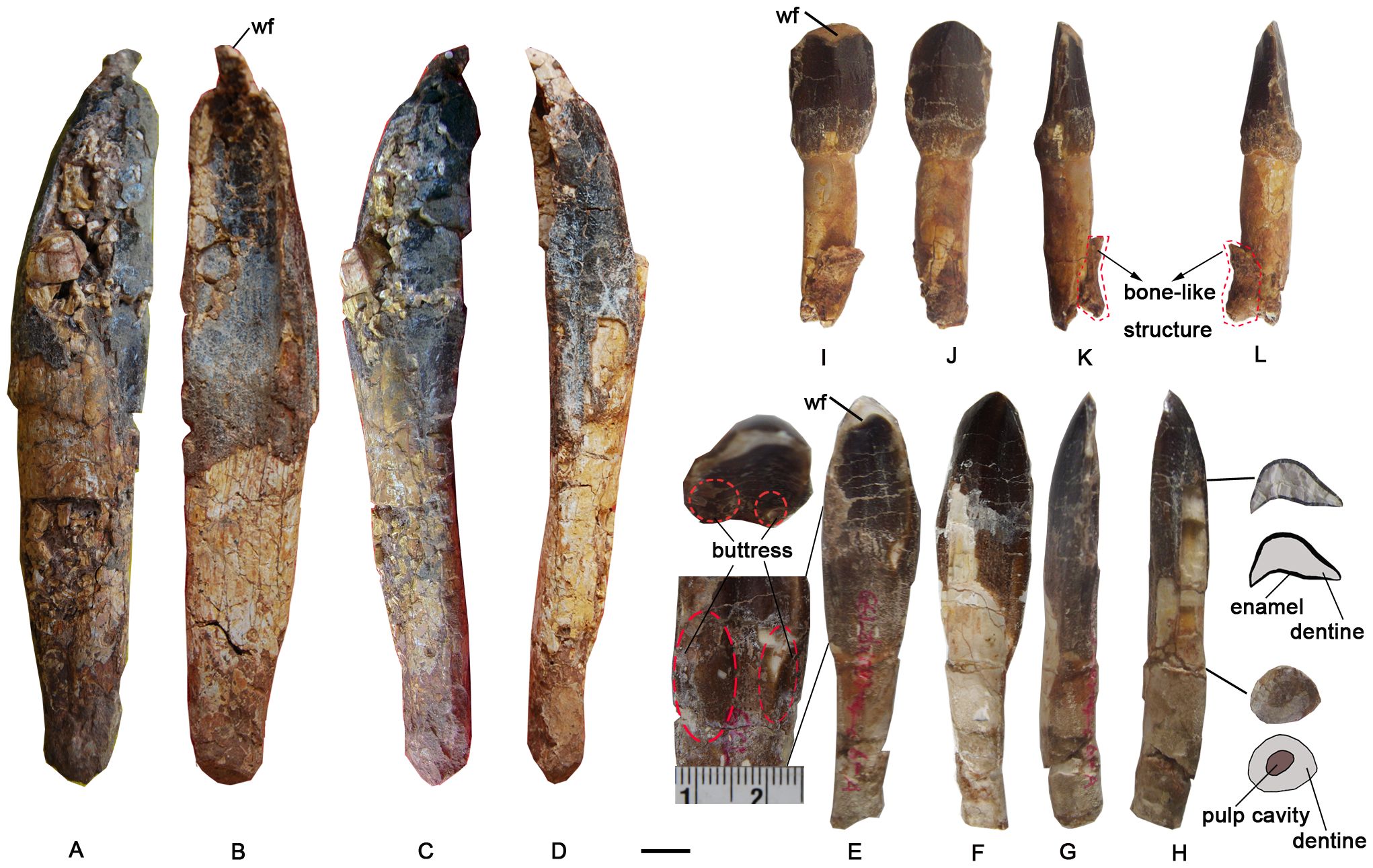
Teeth of the holotype

- Euhelopodidae
  - Jiangshanosaurus
  - - Tangvayosaurus
    - Phuwiangosaurus
  - - Qiaowanlong
    - - Yongjinglong
      - - Euhelopus
        - - Erketu
          - Gobititan
