= Brohisaurus =

Brohisaurus Temporal range: Late Jurassic, Kimmeridgian

Scientific classification
- Kingdom: Animalia
- Phylum: Chordata
- Class: Reptilia
- Clade: Dinosauria
- Genus: †Brohisaurus; Malkani, 2003
- Species: †B. kirthari

Binomial name
- †Brohisaurus kirthari Malkani, 2003

Dubious extinct dinosaur genus

Brohisaurus is a problematic genus of dubious dinosaurs known from the Late Jurassic (Kimmeridgian-aged) Sembar Formation of Pakistan. The genus contains a single species, Brohisaurus kirthari.

== Discovery and naming ==
The Brohisaurus holotype, MSM-86-K to 94-K, 96-K to 98-K, 101-K to 105-K, largely consisting of indeterminate fragments of some ribs, vertebrae, and limb bones, was discovered in the Sembar Formation of Pakistan.

In 2003, Muhammad Sadiq Malkani named and described Brohisaurus kirthari as a new genus and species of titanosaurian sauropods. The genus name means "Brohi lizard" and refers to the Brohi people who live in the area where it was found. The species name refers to the Kirthar Mountains.

== Description and classification ==
If Brohisaurus is a sauropod, as originally identified, it would have been a large-bodied, long-necked herbivore. Its femur is 12 centimetres (4.7 in) in diameter. The femur of the 15–20 metres (49–66 ft)-long titanosauriform Phuwiangosaurus, by contrast, is 20 centimetres (7.9 in) in diameter.

Brohisaurus was originally described as a titanosaur. Malkani suggested it was similar to the early African titanosaur Malawisaurus, arguing that this provided evidence for a biogeographic link between the Indian subcontinent and Africa. However, the phylogenetic position of Brohisaurus is far from clear. None of the proposed traits uniting it to Titanosauria are definitive synapomorphies of that clade, and none of the fossil material is reliably diagnostic, rendering it a dubious taxon. In 2013, Mannion et al. identified two possible synapomorphies of the Titanosauriformes in the type material: pneumatic cavities in its thoracic ribs and femora with elliptical cross sections.

In a 2025 paper published in Scientific Research Publishing, a known predatory publisher, Malkani revisited Brohisaurus and proposed that it could be allied with the Ankylosauridae based on the presence of several osteoderms apparently referrable to this taxon.
