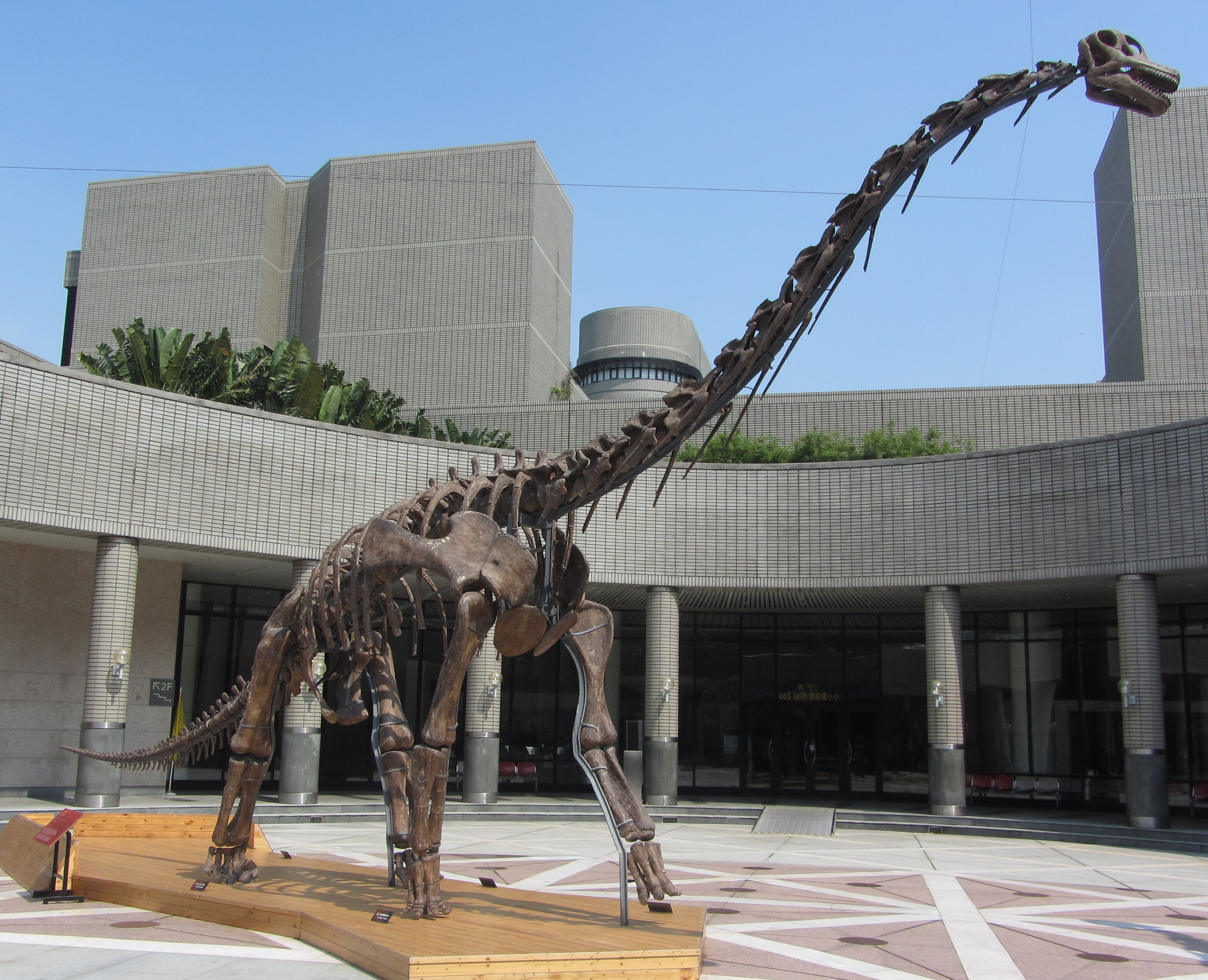
- Restored skeleton

Scientific classification
- Kingdom: Animalia
- Phylum: Chordata
- Class: Reptilia
- Clade: Dinosauria
- Clade: Saurischia
- Clade: †Sauropodomorpha
- Clade: †Sauropoda
- Clade: †Macronaria
- Family: †Euhelopodidae
- Genus: †Qiaowanlong; You & Li, 2009

Type species
- †Qiaowanlong kangxii You & Li, 2009

= Qiaowanlong =

Qiaowanlong Temporal range: Early Cretaceous ~124 to 113 Ma - Aptian

Extinct genus of dinosaurs

Qiaowanlong (meaning "Qiaowan dragon") is an extinct genus of sauropod dinosaur. Fossils belonging to the genus were found in the Yujinzi Basin of what is today Gansu Province, China. The remains come from a geological formation called the Xiagou Formation in the Xinminpu Group, dating to the late Aptian Stage of the Early Cretaceous.

== Discovery and naming ==
The holotype of Qiaowanlong, given the designation FRDC GJ 07-14, was discovered in 2007 by a field expedition of the Fossil Research Development Center (FRDC), who were working on behalf of the provincial government of Gansu. One of the vertebrae of the specimen was broken during transport, but the specimen was excavated and moved to the Gansu Provincial Bureau of Geo-exploration and Mineral Development where they were prepared over the course of the next two years. The description was finally published in 2009 in the Proceedings of the Royal Society B by the Chinese scientists Hai-Lu You and Da-Qing Li.

The name of the genus, Qiaowanlong is a reference to an important cultural site (Qiaowan) which is located near to where the fossils of Qiaowanlong were discovered. The name of the place itself is derived from the Mandarin Chinese word "qiao" — which means "bridge" — and "wan" — which means "bend in a stream". The suffix of the genus name is "long", which means "dragon" and is a rough equivalent to the Ancient Greek suffix, "saurus" (meaning "lizard"), and this is a common suffix in the naming conventions of dinosaurs and other reptiles found in China. The species epithet, Q. kangxii, is in honor of the Kangxi Emperor, who was said to have had dreams of the Qiaowan area.

== Description ==
In their description of Qiaowanlong, You and Li remark that it is relatively small compared to some of its close relatives. They do not provide a full size estimate, but they do note that the seventh cervical vertebra (the longest of the known vertebrae) is 45 cm (18 in) in length. While large in absolute terms, this is only half the size of the same vertebra in Giraffatitan, and only about one-third of the size of the same vertebra in Sauroposeidon. In spite of this relatively small size, the complete fusion of the neural arches to the centra indicates that the holotype individual was a fully-grown adult when it died. Later authors would publish estimates of the full size of Qiaowanlong. Gregory S. Paul suggested a length of about 12 m (39 ft) long and a weight of 6 tons Rubén Molina-Pérez and Asier Larramendi suggested a much larger estimate of 20.7 m (68 ft) long, 4.3 m (14 ft) tall at the shoulder, and 13 tons in weight.

The holotype, and only specimen of Qiaowanlong consists of a series of eight vertebrae from the middle of the neck (probably C4-C11), the complete right half of the pelvis, and several bone fragments that the authors were not able to identify. From these remains, they were able to identify the following autapomorphies, distinguishing Qiaowanlong from all other sauropods: a relatively low elongation index of the vertebrae, deeply bifurcated neural spines, three fossae on the lateral sides of the cervical centra, a relatively shortened ischium, and a long pubic process of the ischium.

== Classification ==
When it was originally described, Qiaowanlong was believed to be member of Brachiosauridae and to be a close relative of Sauroposeidon (which itself was also believed to be a brachiosaurid at the time). Subsequent analyses have found a close relationship between Qiaowanlong and the other Asian sauropods Euhelopus and Erketu, which would place it within Euhelopodidae and therefore imply a closer affinity with titanosaurs than with brachiosaurids. Subsequent analyses have corroborated this finding. Below is an abbreviated cladogram recovered by Philip Mannion and colleagues.

- Somphospondyli
  - Dongbeititan
  - - Euhelopodidae
      - Liubangosaurus
      - - - Gobititan
          - - Phuwiangosaurus
            - Tangvayosaurus
        - - Qiaowanlong
          - - Erketu
            - Euhelopus
    - - Brontomerus
      - - - - Sonorasaurus
            - Tastavinsaurus
          - - Diamantinasaurus
            - Haestasaurus
        - - Sauroposeidon
          - - - Ruyangosaurus
              - Wintonotitan
            - - Huanghetitan liujiaxiaensis
              - - "Huanghetitan" ruyangensis
                - Titanosauria

== Paleoecology ==
=== Paleoenvironment ===
The Xiagou Formation is the second-youngest formation of the Xinminbu Group, and is stratigraphically positioned between the older Chinjinpu Formation and the younger Zhonggou Formation, all of which are located in the Yujingzi Basin of western Gansu. Today, this region is part of the Gobi Desert, but during the Early Cretaceous, it was a much less arid environment, and it was probably on or near the coast of the Tethys Sea.

The sediments of the formation consists of gray to mudstones and siltstones interbedded with sandstones and conglomerates. The composition of the Xiagou Formation indicates that there were likely lowlands surrounded by narrow hills, allowing dinosaur faunas to travel across areas without geographical barriers. Some fossilized waterbirds have been preserved with the soft-tissues of their webbed feet and feathers still preserved, which has led authors to conclude that lakes with anoxic lake beds were also present.

=== Contemporary fauna ===
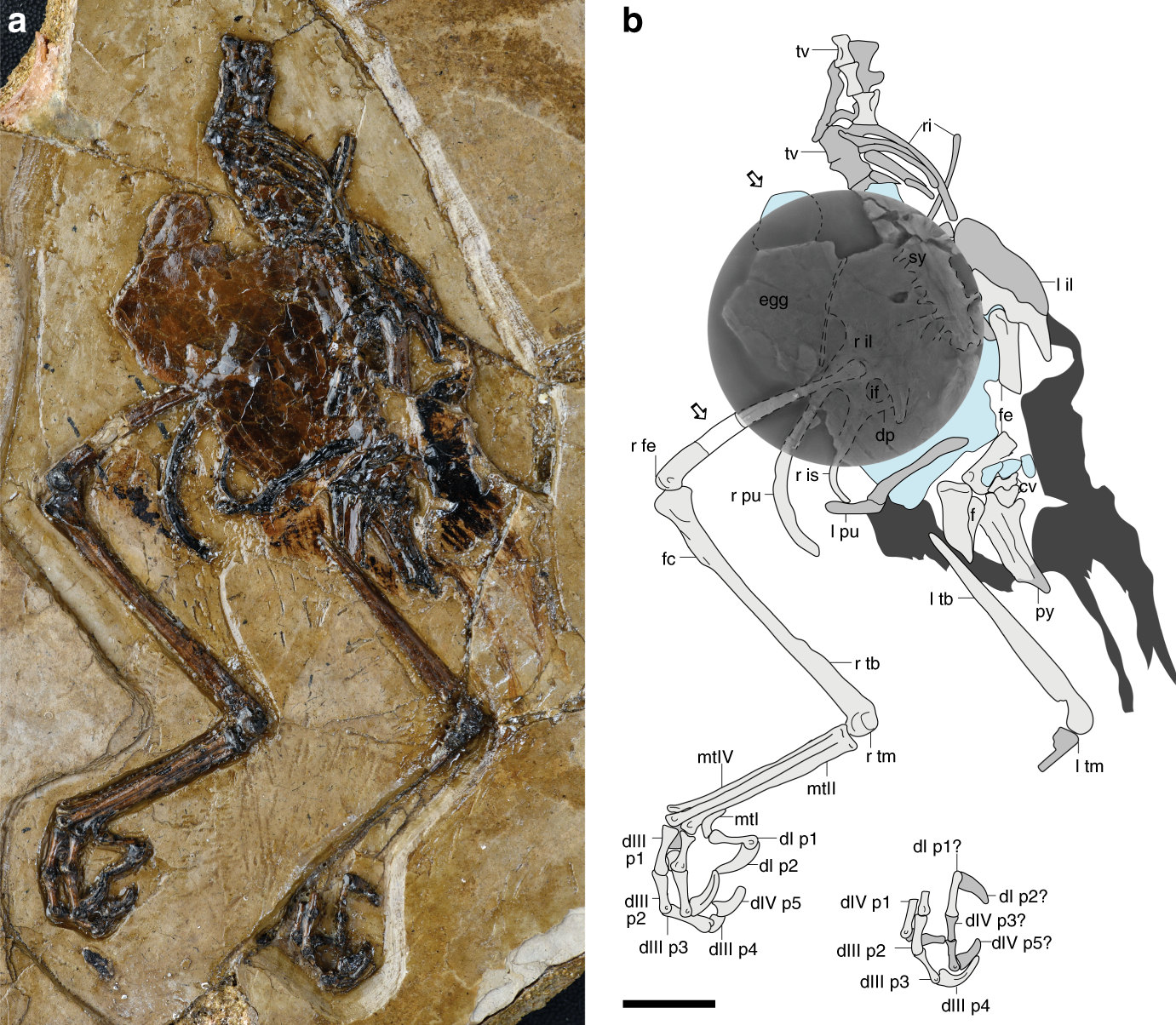

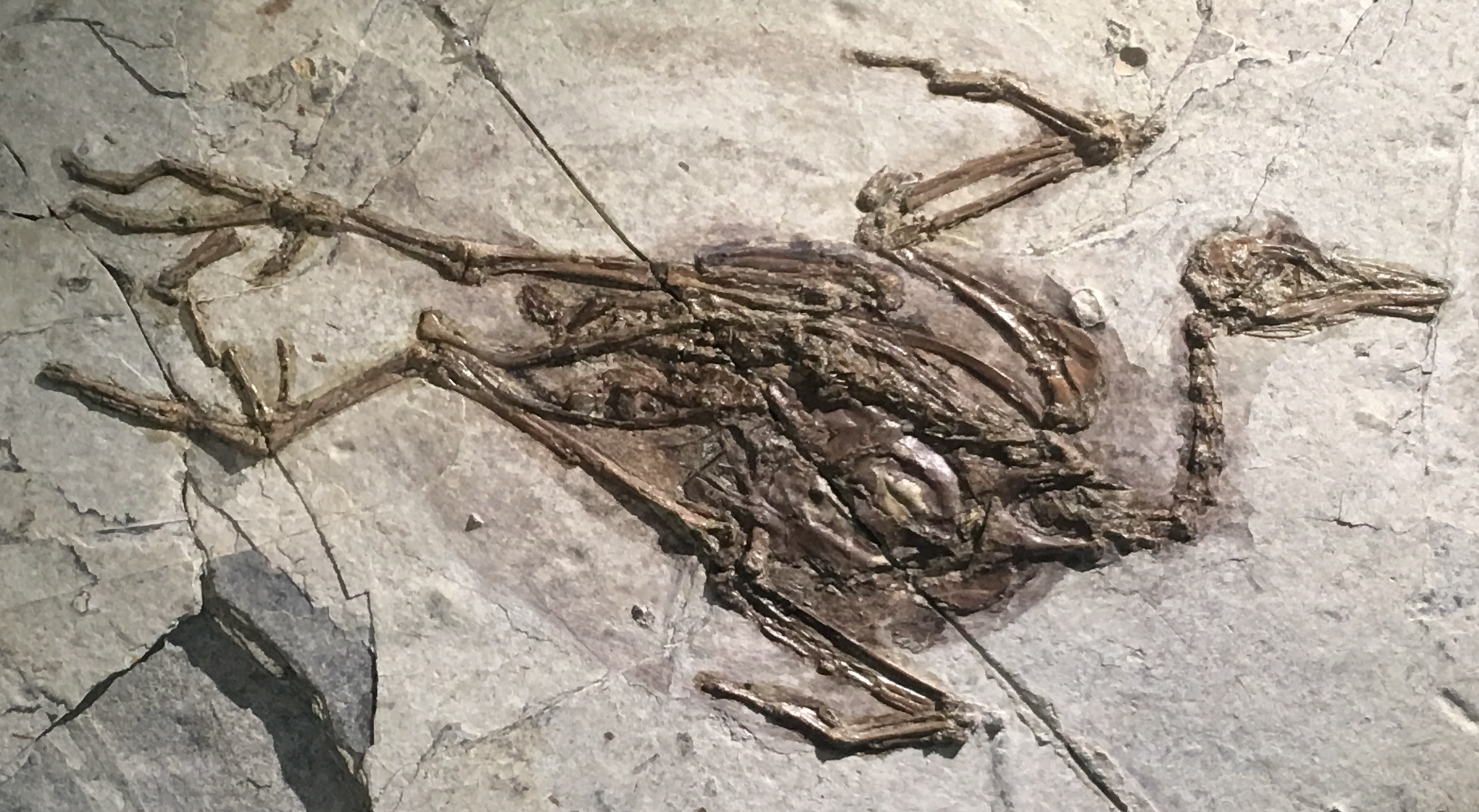
Two well-preserved birds from the Xiagou Formation: Avimaia (top) and Gansus (bottom)

The fauna present in the Xinminbao Group are hypothesized to be the ecological successors to the much more famous Jehol biota, which existed in China during the Barremian and the early Aptian. This fauna, called the "Mazongshan fauna" by some authors, consists of mostly dinosaurs, because the rocks of the Xiagou Formation mostly preserve large vertebrates. There is a major exception to this trend, which are birds. There are numerous well-preserved bird fossils in the Mazongshan biota, most of which are enantiornithines, with relatively few ornithuromorphs. There are also some fish and arthropod fossils preserved in the region.

The most numerous remains found in the region are non-avian dinosaurs. Of these, small ceratopsians were the most abundant, and account for the greatest number of fossils. There are also basal hadrosauroids, titanosauriform sauropods, and large herbivorous ornithomimosaurs and therizinosaurs. Other fragmentary remains have been attributed to oviraptorosaurs, but these have been called into question by some authors.

Qiaowanlong is the only fossil so far known from the Qiaowan locality. Other animals known from the Xiagou Formation, which may have directly coexisted with Qiaowanlong, included the ornithopods, Xuwulong and Jintasaurus, the tyrannosauroid, Xiongguanlong, and the therizinosaur, Suzhousaurus. The small neoceratopsian Archaeoceratops is also present in the area. Enantiornithine birds were abundant and included genera such as Avimaia, Feitianius, and several unnamed forms, and they were accompanied by early euornithean birds such as the duck-like Gansus and the unusual toothed Brevidentavis. Several turtle skeletons have also been found.

== See also ==
- 2009 in archosaur paleontology
- List of Asian dinosaurs
- List of sauropod species
- List of sauropodomorph type specimens
