= Khadir Formation =

Geological formation in India

- Stratigraphic range: Middle to Late Jurassic; ~170.9–154.8 Ma
- Type: Geological formation
- Sub-units: Hadibhadang Member and Dingy Hill Member
- Thickness: 550–600 m (1,800–1,970 ft)

Location
- Coordinates: 23.9°N 70.3°E
- Approximate paleocoordinates: 22.8°S 33.7°E
- Region: Gujrat
- Country: India
- Extent: Katch Basin

Type section
- Named for: Khadir Island
- Khadir Formation (India)

The Khadir Formation is a geological formation in India. It is of Middle Jurassic age. Dinosaur bones are among the fossils recovered from the formation.

== Lithology ==
The Khadir Formation is composed of in variegated to dark red argillaceous silt, where in ceratain horizions the silt are full of diagenetically formed gypsum. Occasionally, the silt is interrupted thin intercalations of fine to medium-grained crossbedded sandstone. The silt overlies whitish, medium-grained sandstone with large trough-crossbeds. Towards the north of Khadir Island a nine meter thick, friable, coarse-grained sandstone occurs, with large trough-crossbedding that cements towards the top and forms a small cliff. The depositional environment appears to have been a floodplain with fluvial channels bue to the variegated and red colours, fossil wood and the sharp erosional base of the sandstones.

== Fossil content ==
Color key: Taxon / Reclassified taxon / Taxon falsely reported as present / Dubious taxon or junior synonym / Ichnotaxon / Ootaxon / Morphotaxon	Notes; Uncertain or tentative taxa are in small text; ~~crossed out~~ taxa are discredited.

=== Dinosaurs ===
==== Sauropods ====
Sauropods from the Karai Formation
Genus	Species	Location	Stratigraphic position	Material	Notes	Images
Sauropoda Indet.	Indeterminate.	Southern margin of Cheriya Bet	Lower	Rib, vertebral fragments and a part of a long bone.		
Camarasauromorpha Indet.	Indeterminate.	Southern margin of Cheriya Bet	Lower	Distal end of a right metacarpal. nearly complete right pedal claw. part of a left fibula.	Possibly represents the oldest known camarasauromorph. May not belong to the same taxon.	
