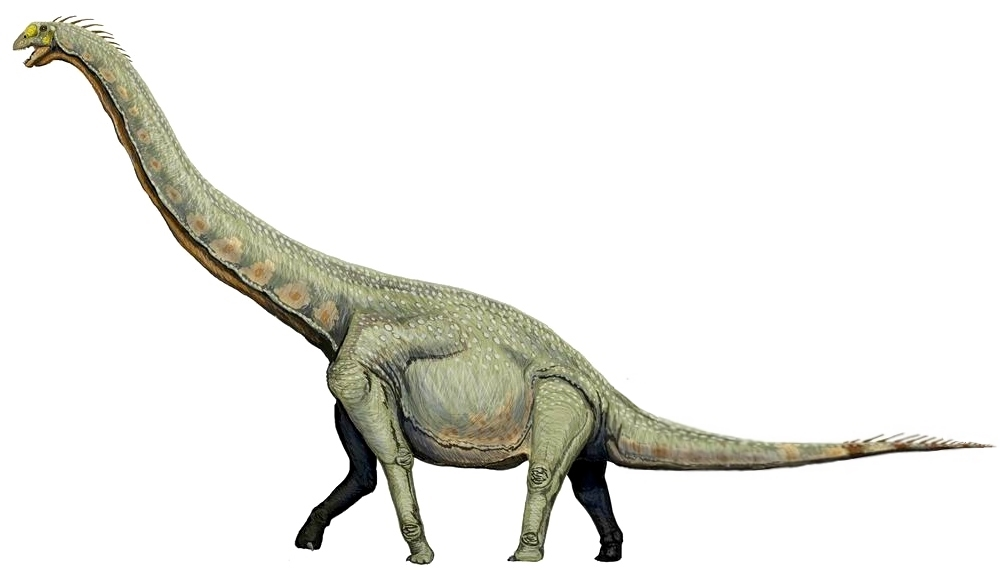
- Life restoration of a Euhelopus zdanskyi

Scientific classification
- Kingdom: Animalia
- Phylum: Chordata
- Class: Reptilia
- Clade: Dinosauria
- Clade: Saurischia
- Clade: †Sauropodomorpha
- Clade: †Sauropoda
- Clade: †Macronaria
- Clade: †Somphospondyli
- Family: †Euhelopodidae; Romer, 1956

Type species
- †Euhelopus zdanskyi Wiman, 1929

Genera
- †Chiayusaurus?; †Daxiatitan?; †Erketu; †Euhelopus; †Gannansaurus?; †Gobititan?; †Huabeisaurus?; †Jiangshanosaurus; †Liaoningotitan; †Liubangosaurus; †Nagatitan; †Phuwiangosaurus; †Qiaowanlong; †Ruixinia?; †Silutitan; †Tambatitanis?; †Tangvayosaurus; †Yongjinglong; †Yunmenglong; †Mamenchisauridae?

Synonyms
- Helopodidae Wiman, 1929

= Euhelopodidae =

Euhelopodids Temporal range: Berriasian–Coniacian, 143.1–88 Ma Possible Late Maastrichtian records.

Extinct family of dinosaurs

Euhelopodidae is a family of sauropod dinosaurs of disputed membership and affinities, which contains Euhelopus and its close relatives. Most proposed euhelopodids are from East Asia.

Euhelopodidae was first recognized by Carl Wiman in 1929, under the name Helopodidae, as Euhelopus was originally named Helopus. However, the name had already been proposed for a bird, so in 1956 Alfred Sherwood Romer proposed the name Euhelopus and Euhelopodinae as replacements; Romer classified Euhelopodinae as a subfamily of Brachiosauridae, in which he also included Camarasaurinae and Cetiosaurinae, rather than as a family of its own. In addition to Euhelopus itself, Romer included Chiayusaurus, Omeisaurus, and Tienshanosaurus in Euhelopodinae.

The taxonomic content of Euhelopodidae is uncertain, as a result of the unstable position of Euhelopus itself. Some studies have concluded that Euhelopus is a non-neosauropod closely related to Mamenchisaurus, which would make Euhelopodidae equivalent to Mamenchisauridae. Other studies have interpreted Euhelopus as neosauropod united with titanosaurs in Somphospondyli. A joint study by Jeffrey Wilson and Paul Upchurch, who had previously taken opposite sides in the debate, concluded that Euhelopus was closely related to titanosaurs. However, the lack of research on Mamenchisaurus-like taxa has hindered proper testing of this hypothesis, and there are several similarities between Euhelopus and Mamenchisaurus-like taxa that have not been taken into account in most analyses.

Michael D'Emic (2012) formulated the first phylogenetic definition of Euhelopodidae, defining it as the clade containing "neosauropods more closely related to Euhelopus zdanskyi than to Neuquensaurus australis". Below is a cladogram presenting the cladistic hypothesis of Euhelopodidae proposed by D'Emic.

- Euhelopodidae
  - Qiaowanlong
  - - Erketu
    - - Euhelopus
      - Daxiatitan
      - - Tangvayosaurus
        - Phuwiangosaurus

In their 2021 description of Silutitan, Wang et al. recovered it as a derived euhelopodid, as the sister taxon to Euhelopus. The results of their phylogenetic analysis, which included several other euhelopodid taxa, are shown in the cladogram below:

- - - Huanghetitan
    - - Europatitan
      - Tastavinsaurus
  - - Euhelopodidae
      - - Phuwiangosaurus
        - Tangvayosaurus
      - - Qiaowanlong
        - - - "Huanghetitan" ruyangensis
            - Ruyangosaurus
            - Yongjinglong
          - - - Erketu
              - Gobititan
            - - Euhelopus
              - Silutitan
    - - Padillasaurus
      - Titanosauria
