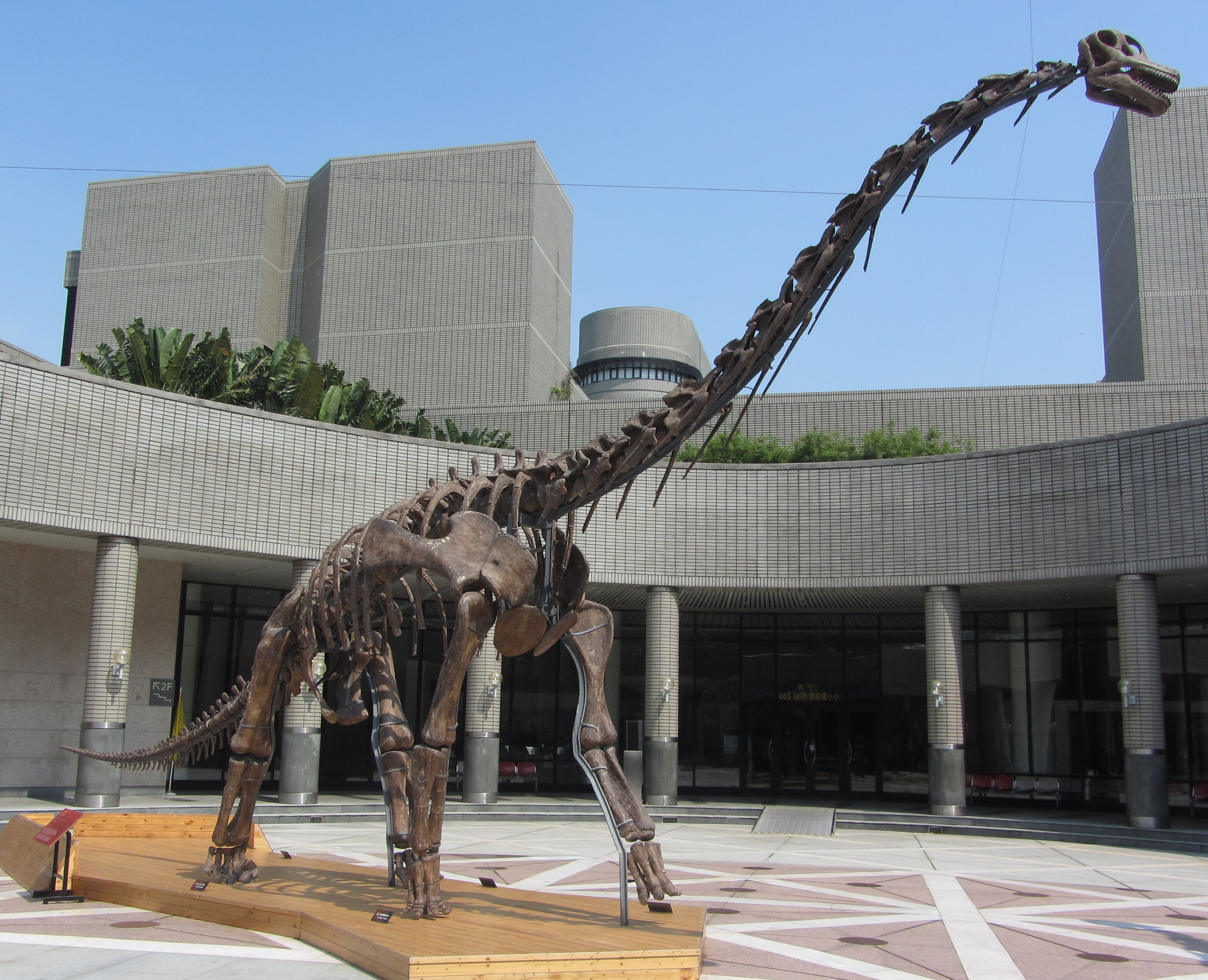
- Skeleton of Qiaowanlong

Scientific classification
- Kingdom: Animalia
- Phylum: Chordata
- Class: Reptilia
- Clade: Dinosauria
- Clade: Saurischia
- Clade: †Sauropodomorpha
- Clade: †Sauropoda
- Clade: †Macronaria
- Clade: †Camarasauromorpha
- Clade: †Titanosauriformes
- Clade: †Somphospondyli; Wilson & Sereno, 1998

Subgroups
- †Diamantinasauria
- †Euhelopodidae
- †Titanosauria
Uncertain affinity and basal genera
- †Agustinia?
- †Angolatitan
- †Arkharavia?
- †Astrophocaudia
- †Australodocus
- †Austrosaurus?
- †Brontomerus
- †Chubutisaurus
- †Dasosaurus
- †Dongbeititan
- †Dongyangosaurus
- †Europatitan
- †Garumbatitan
- †Gobititan?
- †Huanghetitan
- †Jiangxititan?
- †Liaoningotitan
- †Ligabuesaurus
- †Padillasaurus
- †Pukyongosaurus?
- †Ruixinia?
- †Sauroposeidon
- †Sibirotitan
- †Tastavinsaurus
- †Triunfosaurus
- †Wintonotitan?

= Somphospondyli =

Somphospondylans Temporal range: Late Jurassic to Late Cretaceous, 150–66 Ma

Extinct clade of sauropods

Somphospondyli is an extinct clade of titanosauriform sauropods that lived from the Late Jurassic until the end of the Late Cretaceous, comprising all titanosauriforms more closely related to Titanosauria proper than Brachiosauridae. The remains of somphospondylans have been discovered on all continents.

== Classification ==
The group has officially been defined under the PhyloCode as the largest clade containing Saltasaurus loricatus, but not Giraffatitan brancai. Features found as diagnostic of this clade by Mannion et al. (2013) include the possession of at least 15 cervical vertebrae; a bevelled radius bone end; sacral vertebrae with camellate internal texture; convex posterior articular surfaces of middle to posterior caudal vertebrae; biconvex distal caudal vertebrae; humerus anterolateral corner "squared"; among multiple others.

The following cladogram depicts the reference phylogeny used to defined Somphospondlyi under the PhyloCode.

- Somphospondyli
  - Sauroposeidon proteles
  - - - Ruyangosaurus giganteus
      - - Euhelopus zdanskyi
        - - Erketu ellisoni
          - - Phuwiangosaurus sirindhornae
            - Qiaowanlong kangxii
    - - Chubutisaurus insignis
      - - Ligabuesaurus leanzai
        - - Wintonotitan wattsi
          - Titanosauria
            - - Andesaurus delgadoi
              - Wintonotitan wattsi
            - - Colossosauria
              - - Dreadnoughtus schrani
                - Eutitanosauria
