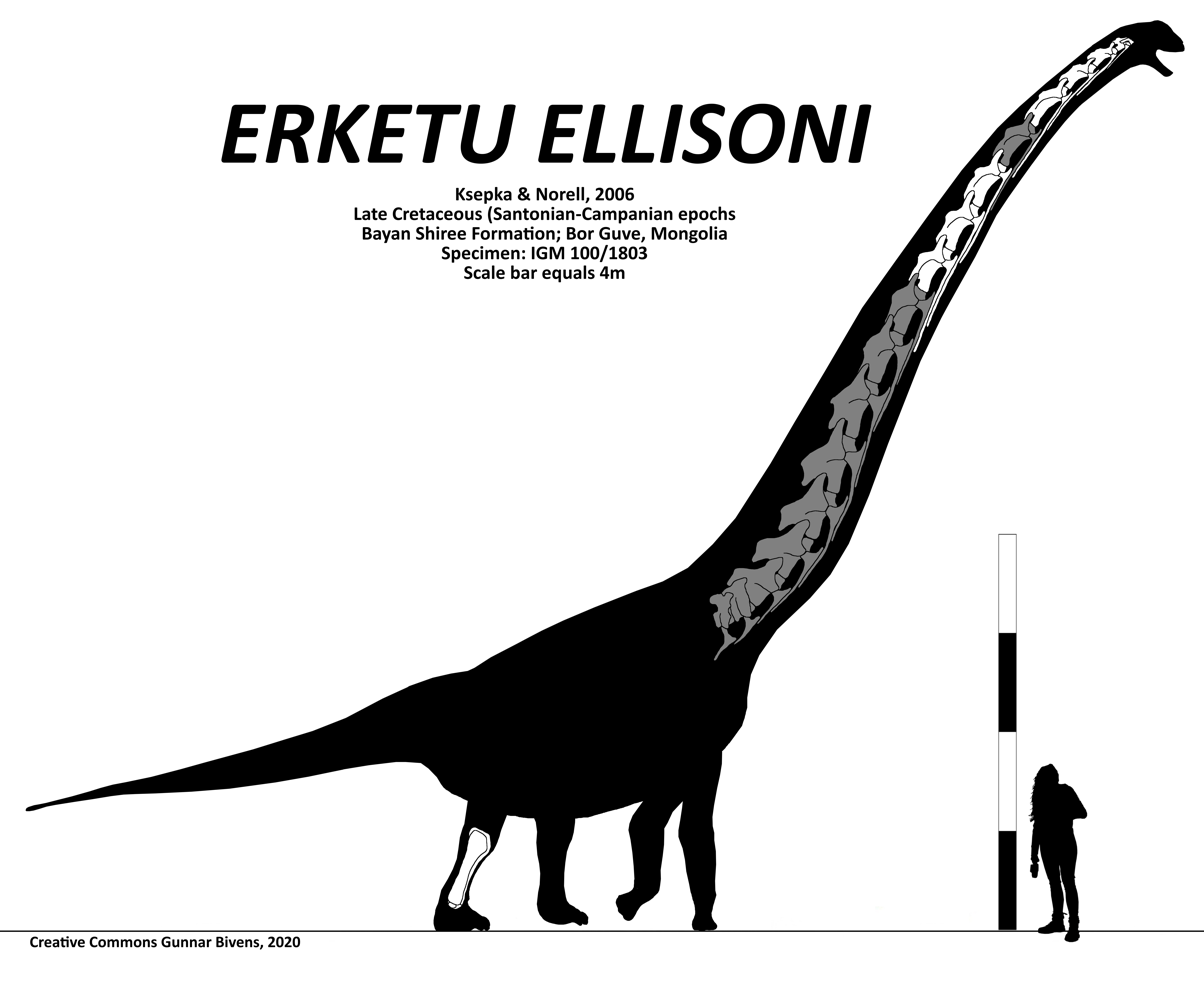
- Skeletal reconstruction of the holotype

Scientific classification
- Kingdom: Animalia
- Phylum: Chordata
- Class: Reptilia
- Clade: Dinosauria
- Clade: Saurischia
- Clade: †Sauropodomorpha
- Clade: †Sauropoda
- Clade: †Macronaria
- Clade: †Titanosauriformes
- Clade: †Somphospondyli
- Genus: †Erketu; Ksepka & Norell, 2006

Type species
- †Erketu ellisoni Ksepka & Norell, 2006

= Erketu =

Erketu Temporal range: Late Cretaceous, ~96–89 Ma

Sauropod genus from the Late Cretaceous

Erketu (meaning "Erketü tengri") is a genus of somphospondylan dinosaur that lived in Asia during the Late Cretaceous, roughly between 96 million and 89 million years ago. It is known from the Bayanshiree Formation of Mongolia, and its fossils were found between 2002 and 2003 during field expeditions. Erketu was first described in 2006 and later on in 2010 due to some cervicals that were left behind in the expedition. This genus represents the first sauropod described from the Bayanshiree Formation. The elongated cervical vertebrae indicate that it probably had the longest neck relative to its body size of any sauropod.

== Discovery and naming ==
The first remains of Erketu were found in 2002 by the American Museum of Natural History–Mongolian Academy of Sciences expedition conducted in Mongolia. The team discovered the outcrops of the new locality Bor Guvé, which overlies the Khara Kuthul locality and therefore is referable to the Bayan Shireh Formation. The unearthed specimen, IGM 100/1803, was found in exposure at the sediments of Bor Guvé, mainly composed by sandstone and interbedded grey siltstones, suggesting a fluvial environment that is consistent with the Bayan Shireh Formation. Collected elements are mainly represented by cervical vertebrae and postcranial remains, such as the partial right sternum, tibia and fibula with astragalus and calcaneum.

The remains became the holotype for the new genus and species Erketu ellisoni, first described in 2006 by Daniel T. Ksepka and Mark Norell of the American Museum of Natural History. The generic name of this particular sauropod species is named after the creator god (tengri) of the Mongolian shamanism, Erketü. The specific name, ellisoni, is in honor to the American Museum of Natural History's senior principal paleoartist, and close friend of Norell: Mick Ellison. In 2003 the team returned to the site and recovered three additional cervicals that were left behind during the first field expedition, and consequently described in 2010.

== Description ==
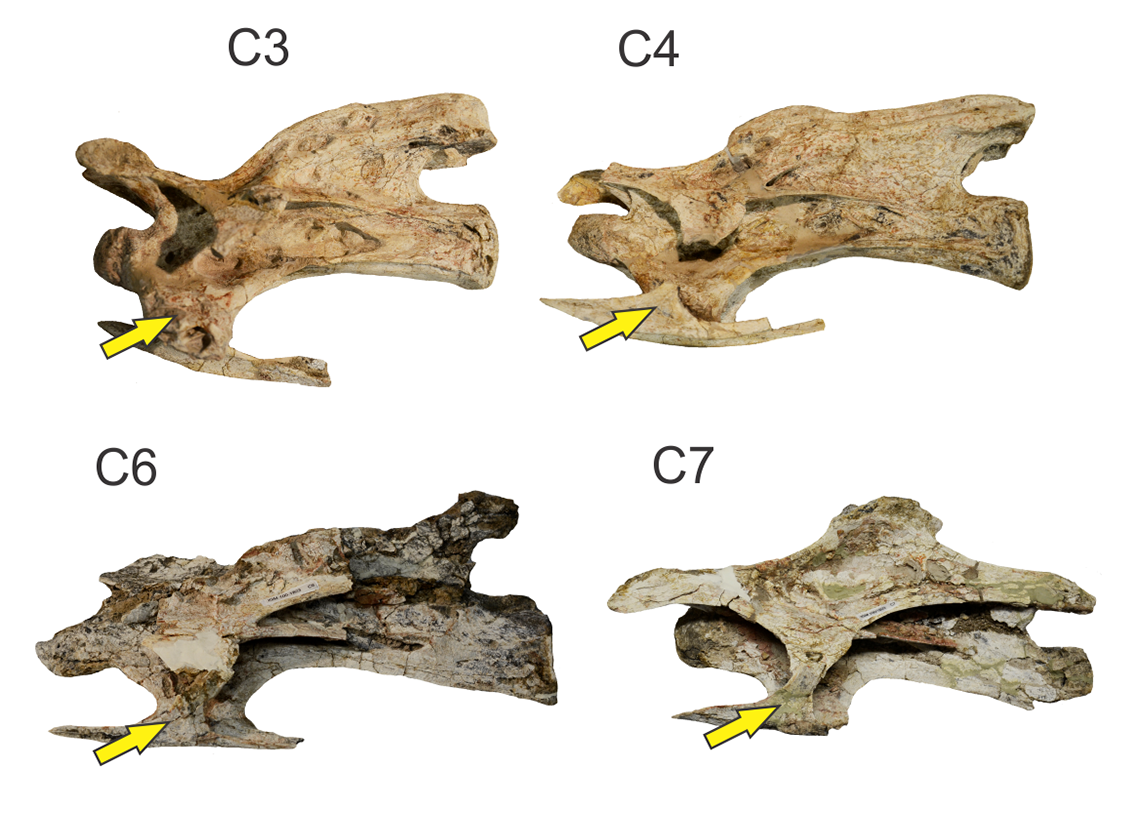
Four cervical vertebrae from the holotype

Erketu was a relatively large sauropod, with an estimated length of 15 m (49 ft) and a weight of 5 t (11,000 lb). Its neck was estimated to be twice as long as its body, which may be a record for neck to body ratio. The exact ratio is unknown, because no dorsal vertebrae of E. ellisoni have been reported, although some hindlimb material suggests the approximate size of the body. The long neck of Erketu is the result of the individual vertebrae being greatly elongated; it is unknown if the number of cervical vertebrae was increased. Erketu is also diagnosed by bifurcate anterior cervical neural spines, another unusual trait for a titanosauriform. The preserved cervicals include the atlas, axis and C3 to C9, however, the sixth is missing, giving a total of eight preserved cervical vertebrae.

Size comparison with a human

The preserved sternum is rather thickened at some borders and shows a very deep lateral edge, it measures about 530 mm (53 cm) long. The right hindlimb elements were nicely found in articulation and they resemble those of Gobititan. The tibia is very straight, measuring 710 mm (71 cm) in total length, it has slightly expanded ends and in comparison to that of Opisthocoelicaudia, the anterior and distal expansions are not very developed. The fibula is longer than the tibia with a length of 750 mm (75 cm), however, it appears to be broken on the distal end of one of the trochanters.

== Classification ==
The phylogenetic analysis of sauropods performed by its describers indicates that Erketu is a basal somphospondylian (the clade of all macronarians closer to titanosaurs than to brachiosaurids), and is most closely related to Titanosauria, being a close relative of Euhelopus.

During the description of Europatitan in 2017, a new cladistic analysis was performed. Here, Erketu was recovered in a polytomy along Chubutisaurus within the Somphospondyli:

- Somphospondyli
  - Europatitan eastwoodi
  - Tendaguria tanzaniensis
  - - Sauroposeidon proteles
    - - Chubutisaurus insignis
      - Erketu ellisoni
      - - - - Titanosauria

== Paleoecology ==
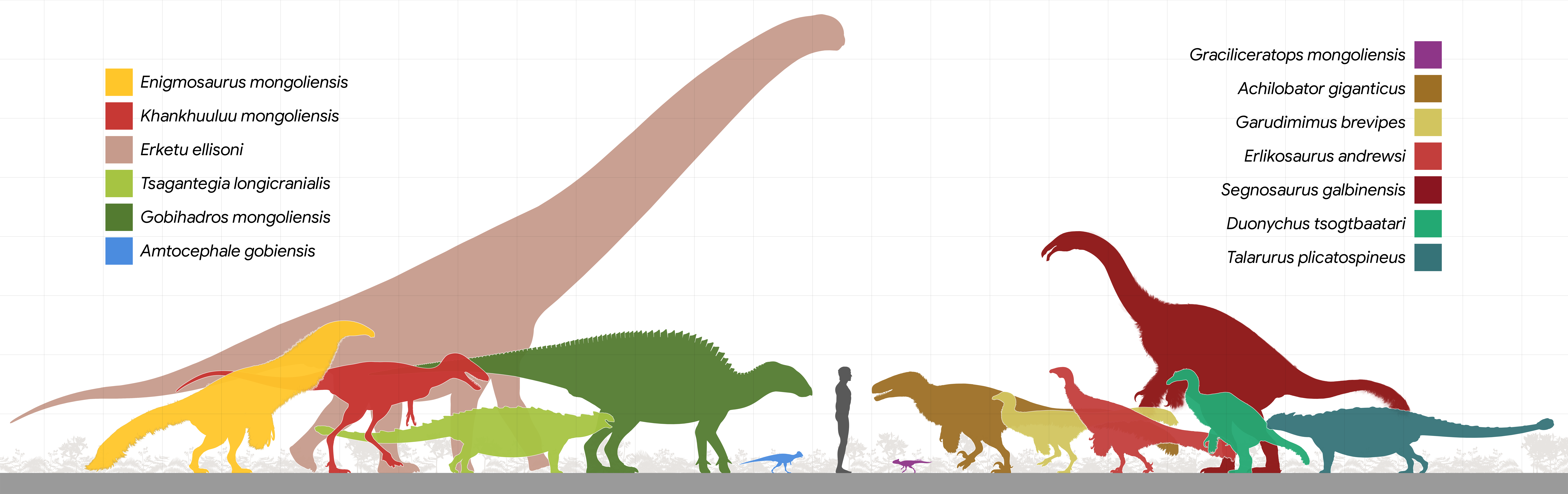
Erketu compared to the known Dinosauria of the Bayan Shireh Formation (Erketu in brown, third from left)

The remains of Erketu are attributed to the Bayan Shireh Formation, which is believed to have been dominated by fluvial and lacustrine environments, such as large meanders and lakes but also a notorious semi-arid climate. The age is estimated to be around 95.9 ± 6.0 million to 89.6 ± 4.0 million years ago, Cenomanian to Coniacian stages. Here, Erketu lived alongside diverse dinosaur fauna, such as the theropods Achillobator and Khankhuuluu, the abundant hadrosauroid Gobihadros, heavy armored ankylosaurs Talarurus and Tsagantegia, and the well-known therizinosaurs Erlikosaurus and Segnosaurus. The locality of Erketu has also yielded an indeterminate/unnamed titanosaur and very abundant fossilized fruits. Some ecological niches were filled by several dinosaurs, such as the browsers Erlikosaurus, Segnosaurus and Tsagantegia; in contrast, Talarurus was a grazer. Erketu in the other hand, due to its very long neck, was likely a high browser.

== See also ==
- Mark Norell
- Sauropod neck posture
