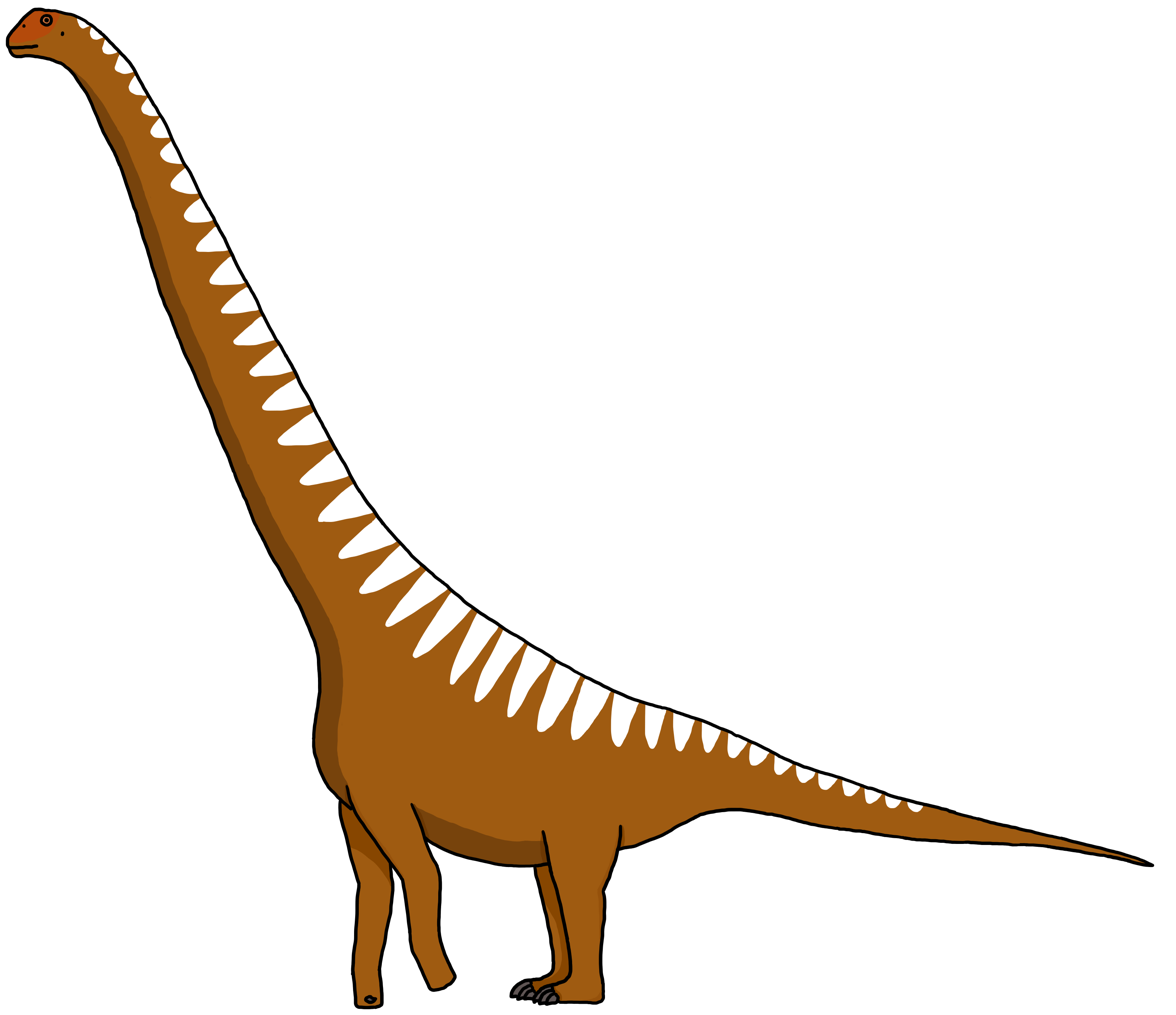
- Life restoration

Scientific classification
- Kingdom: Animalia
- Phylum: Chordata
- Class: Reptilia
- Clade: Dinosauria
- Clade: Saurischia
- Clade: †Sauropodomorpha
- Clade: †Sauropoda
- Clade: †Macronaria
- Clade: †Somphospondyli
- Genus: †Dongbeititan; Wang et al., 2007

Type species
- †Dongbeititan dongi Wang et al., 2007

= Dongbeititan =

Dongbeititan Temporal range: Early Cretaceous (Barremian), 125.46 Ma

Extinct genus of dinosaurs

Dongbeititan is a genus of sauropod dinosaur from the Early Cretaceous Yixian Formation of Beipiao, Liaoning, China. It is based on holotype DNHM D2867, a partial postcranial skeleton including bones from the limbs, shoulder and pelvic girdles, and vertebrae, which was described in 2007. Its describers suggested it was as a basal titanosauriform, not as derived as Gobititan or Jiutaisaurus, but more derived than Euhelopus, Fusuisaurus, and Huanghetitan. The type species is D. dongi, and it is the first named sauropod from the Yixian Formation, which is part of the well-known Jehol Group. The genus name refers to the region Dongbei and to Greek titan, "giant". The specific name honours the Chinese paleontologist Dong Zhiming. Like other sauropods, Dongbeititan would have been a large quadrupedal herbivore.

== Discovery ==
Fossils of an unknown dinosaur were found in north-eastern China, in western Liaoning province, in the region of Beipiao. The bones lay in a valley between Libalang and Er Valleys, about 5 km north-western from Sihetun Fossil Museum in Beipiao. This area is covered by rocks belonging to the Jehol Group, formed in the Early Cretaceous. Between these rocks numerous discoveries have already been made. Xu & Norel (2006) enlisted from Jehol group 25 species of non-avian dinosaurs, among them Ornithopoda (Jeholosaurus shangyuanensis, Jinzhousaurus yangi), Ankylosauria (Liaoningosaurus paradoxus) and Ceratopsia (Psittacosaurus meileyingensis, P. mongoliensis, P. sp., Hongshanosaurus houi, Liaoceratops yanzigouensis), and especially members of different Coelurosauria groups, such as Compsognathidae (Huaxiagnathus orientalis, Sinosauropteryx prima), Therizinosauroidea (Beipiaosaurus inexpectus), Ornithomimosauria (Shenzhousaurus orientalis), Oviraptorosauria (Caudipteryx zou, C. dongi, Incisivosaurus gauthieri), Tyrannosauroidea (Dilong paradoxus, D. sp.). (their list does not include taxa described later, as Yutyrannus), Dromaeosauridae (Graciliraptor lujiatunensis, Microraptor gui, M. zhaoianus, Sinornithosaurus milleni), Troodontidae (Sinovenator changii, Mei long, Sinucerasaurus magodens), and further unclassified (Protarchaeopteryx robusta, Yixianosaurus longimanus). Remains of Sauropodomorpha were found only in the form of fossils incertae sedis. No taxon had been described from them, which made the picture of Jehol fauna incomplete. The aforementioned new fossils were found in the rocks of Jehol group-belonging Yixian Formation, formed in barremian. In 2006 the fossils were gained by the Natural History Museum in Dalian and the Lufeng Dinosaur Research Center of Yunnan Province offered help in specimen preparation. The specimen was exposed by the mentioned museum, cataloged as D2867. In 2012, embedded tooth of Sinocalliopteryx in the incomplete thoracic rib shaft from the holotype was described.

== Description ==
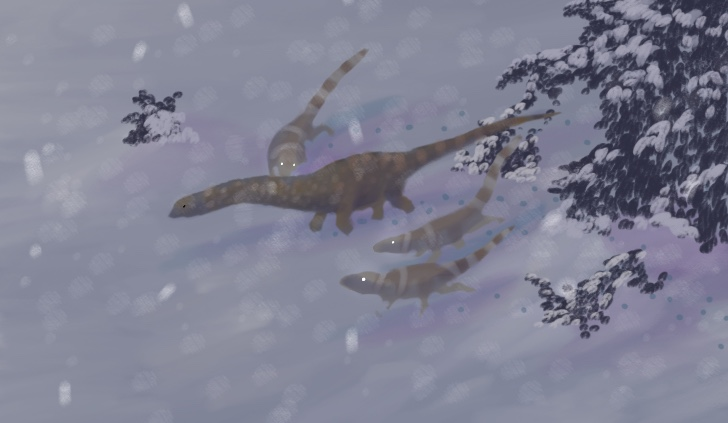
Illustration showing a pack of Yutyrannus hunting Dongbeititan

The bones were characterized by a camelar structure of presacral vertebrae, pneumatocoels on proximal extremities of dorsal costae, and medially bent proximal femur. Mentioned traits suggest that the specimen belongs to Titanosauriformes, a sauropod group from Macronarian line, one of 2 main lines of evolutionarily derived sauropods. Titanosauriformes, created by Leonardo Salgado, contain Brachiosaurus and Titanosauria. It means it comprise Brachiosauridae, Euhelopus and Titanosauria, wherein the last two of mentioned made up a clade Somphospondyli. The newly described specimen belongs to Somphospondyli too, but not to Titanosauria, defined as all Titanosauriformes closer to Saltasaurus than Brachiosaurus or Euhelopus. This evolutionary advanced group links Saltasauridae, Nemegtosauridae and Malawisaurus. Authors, besides they classified the new taxon in Somphospondyli, described it as a basal Titanosauriformes member. As traits distinguishing it from its relatives, they point out firstly coracoid bone elongated anteroposteriorly and of square capitoventral end and secondly long, smooth, slightly convex acetabular margin of pubic bone. Having given the diagnostic traits, the authors could describe a new genus of Dinosauria. They named it Dongbeititan. The generic name refers to a place where the bones have been found, a Dongbei region containing Chinese provinces Liaoning, Jilin, and Heilongjiang. Its name comes from chinese language. To that Dongbei second word titan was joined. It descends from greek and was denoting enormous giants from Greek mythology, Titans, sons of Uranus and Gaia, a primordial deities defeated by later Olimpic gods. In the genus a single species was placed, namely Dongbeititan dongi. Its specific epithet honors palaeontology professor Dong Zhiming in recognition of his contributions to research and education in the field of Chinese dinosaurs. Wang et al. didn't publish in their paper any cladogram presenting the position of the new genus on the evolutionary tree of Titanosauriformes. In 2024, Paul estimated its length at 15 m (49 ft), and its weight at 7 tonnes (6.9 long tons; 7.7 short tons).
