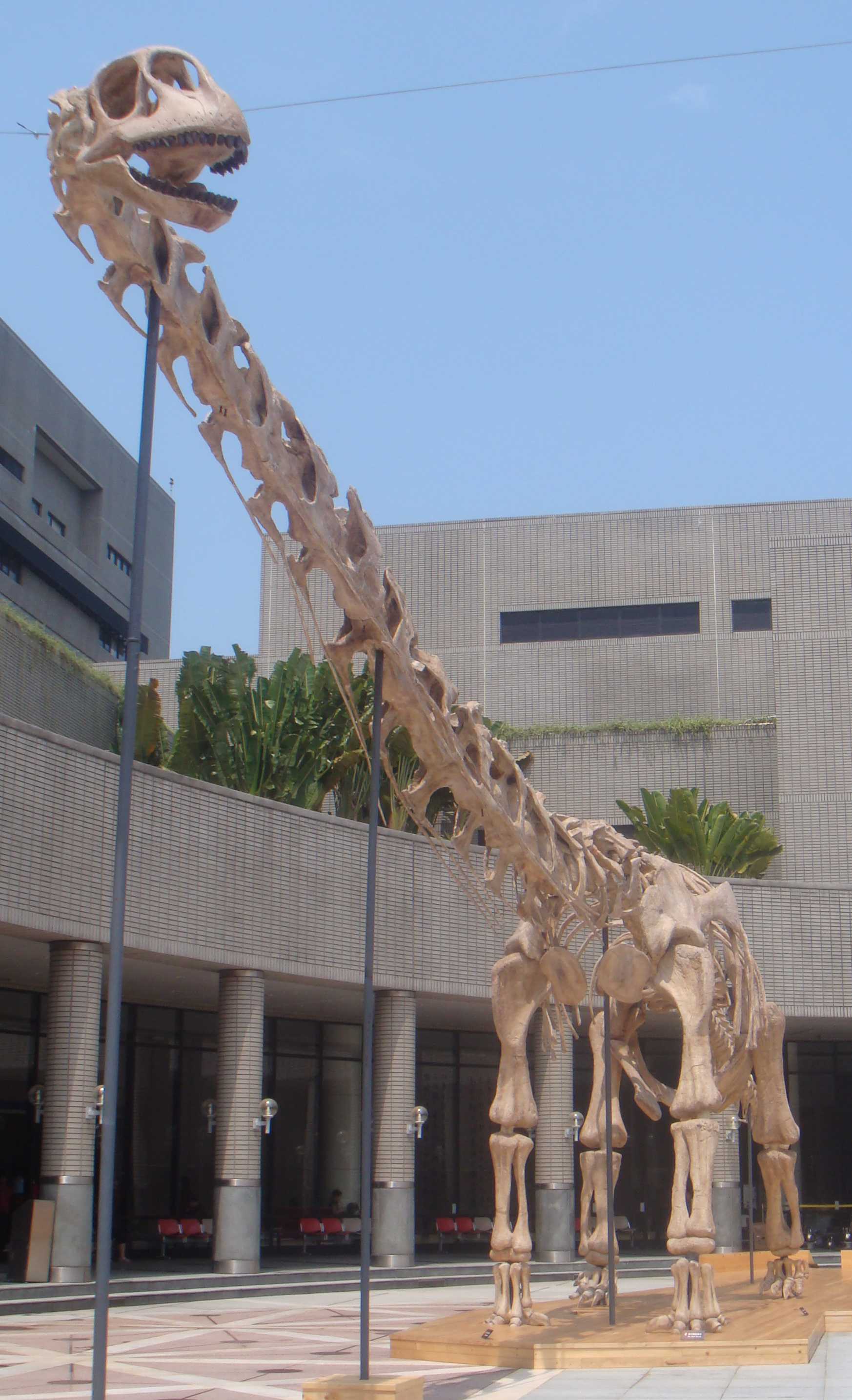
- Mounted skeleton cast

Scientific classification
- Kingdom: Animalia
- Phylum: Chordata
- Class: Reptilia
- Clade: Dinosauria
- Clade: Saurischia
- Clade: †Sauropodomorpha
- Clade: †Sauropoda
- Clade: †Macronaria
- Clade: †Titanosauria
- Genus: †Daxiatitan; You et al., 2008
- Species: †D. binglingi

Binomial name
- †Daxiatitan binglingi You et al., 2008

= Daxiatitan =

Daxiatitan Temporal range: Lower Cretaceous, 122.6 Ma

Extinct genus of dinosaurs

Daxiatitan (Note: Chinese: 大夏巨龙; pinyin: Dàxiàjùlóng; meaning "Daxia giant" after a tributary of the Yellow River) is a genus of sauropod dinosaur known from the Lower Cretaceous of Gansu, China. Its type and only species is Daxiatitan binglingi. (Note: Chinese: 炳灵大夏巨龙; pinyin: Bǐnglíng Dàxiàjùlóng) It is known from a single partial skeleton consisting of most of the neck and back vertebrae, two tail vertebrae, a shoulder blade, and a thigh bone. At the time of its discovery in 2008, Daxiatitan was regarded as potentially the largest known dinosaur from China.

== Taxonomy ==
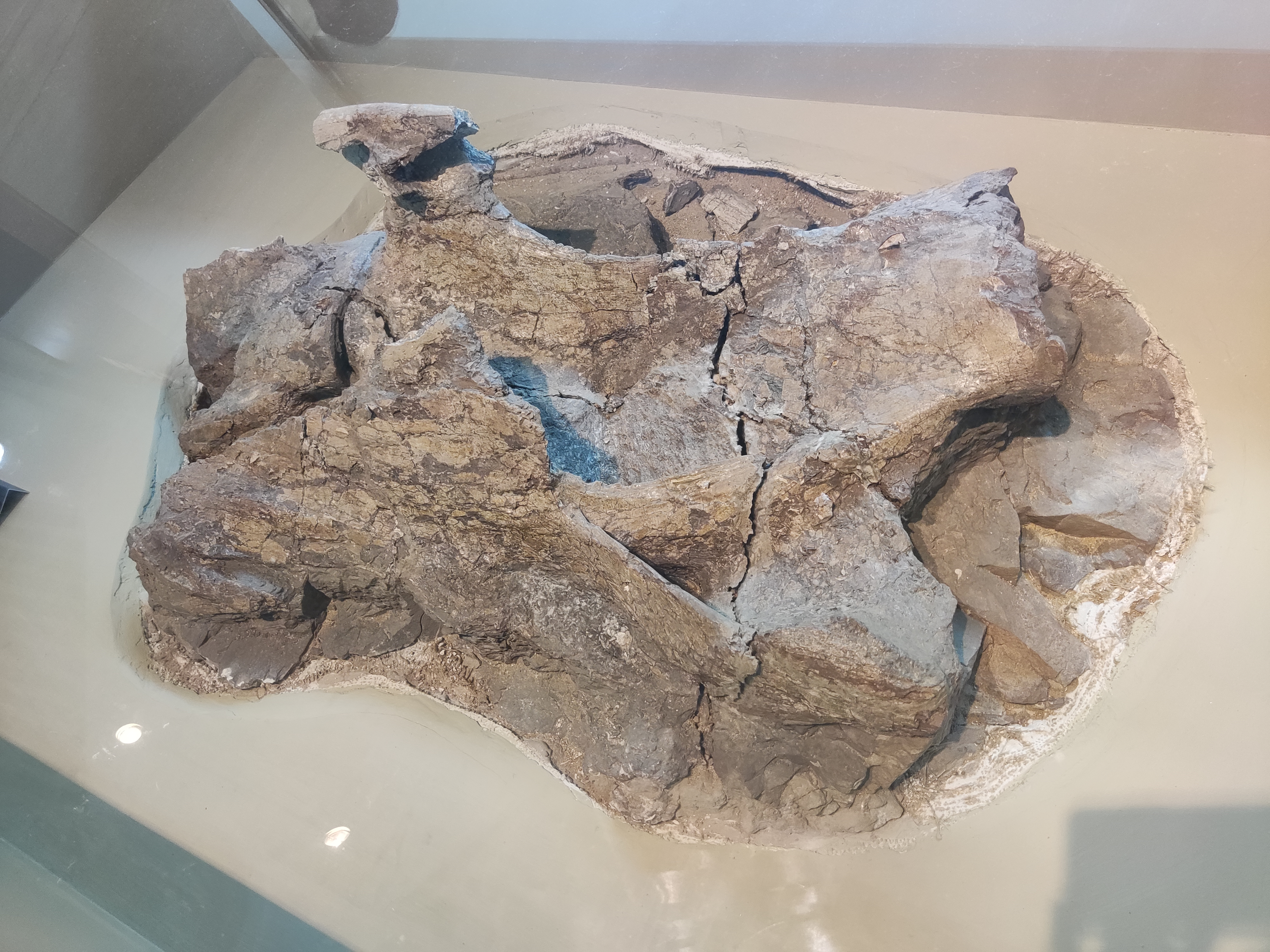
Vertebra in Anhui Geological Museum

Daxiatitan and its type and only species Daxiatitan binglingi were named by You Hailu, Li Daqing, Zhou Lingqi, and Ji Qiang in 2008. The holotype of D. binglingi, GSLTZP03-001, was collected from the Hekou Group, in Gansu Province, and consists of ten cervical, ten dorsal, and two caudal vertebrae, cervical and dorsal ribs, a haemal arch, a scapulocoracoid, and a femur.

The genus name refers to the Daxia River, a tributary of the Yellow River that runs through the area where the type specimen was found, and the species name refers to Bingling Temple, which is located in the region.

Daxiatitan was initially described as a basal titanosaur, and most subsequent studies have regarded it as a basal titanosaur or as a somphospondylan close to Titanosauria in Euhelopodidae. In 2020, a phylogenetic analysis conducted by Moore et al. found that Daxiatitan and Euhelopus may form a clade with mamenchisaurids.

== Description ==
Size, restored as a euhelopodid, compared to a human

Daxiatitan was an exceptionally large dinosaur, among the largest known from China. Its length has been estimated as 23–30 meters (75–98 ft), (Note: Based on the proportions of Euhelopus and Mamenchisaurus, the discoverers of Daxiatitan estimated its length to be up to 30 meters (98 ft). Thomas Holtz later estimated its length at 23 meters (75 ft). In 2020, Molina-Pérez and Larramendi estimated its length as 25 meters (82 ft).) and its mass has been estimated as 23 tonnes. The neck of Daxiatitan is estimated to have been approximately 12 metres (39 ft) long, (Note: The preserved portion of the neck in the only known specimen of Daxiatitan is 6.1 metres (20 ft) long. Based on the proportions of Euhelopus, You et al. estimated that only about half of the total length of the neck is preserved, for a total neck length of 12.2 meters.) making it among the longer-necked sauropods, although still surpassed by the 15-meter neck of some of the largest mamenchisaurids and diplodocids.
