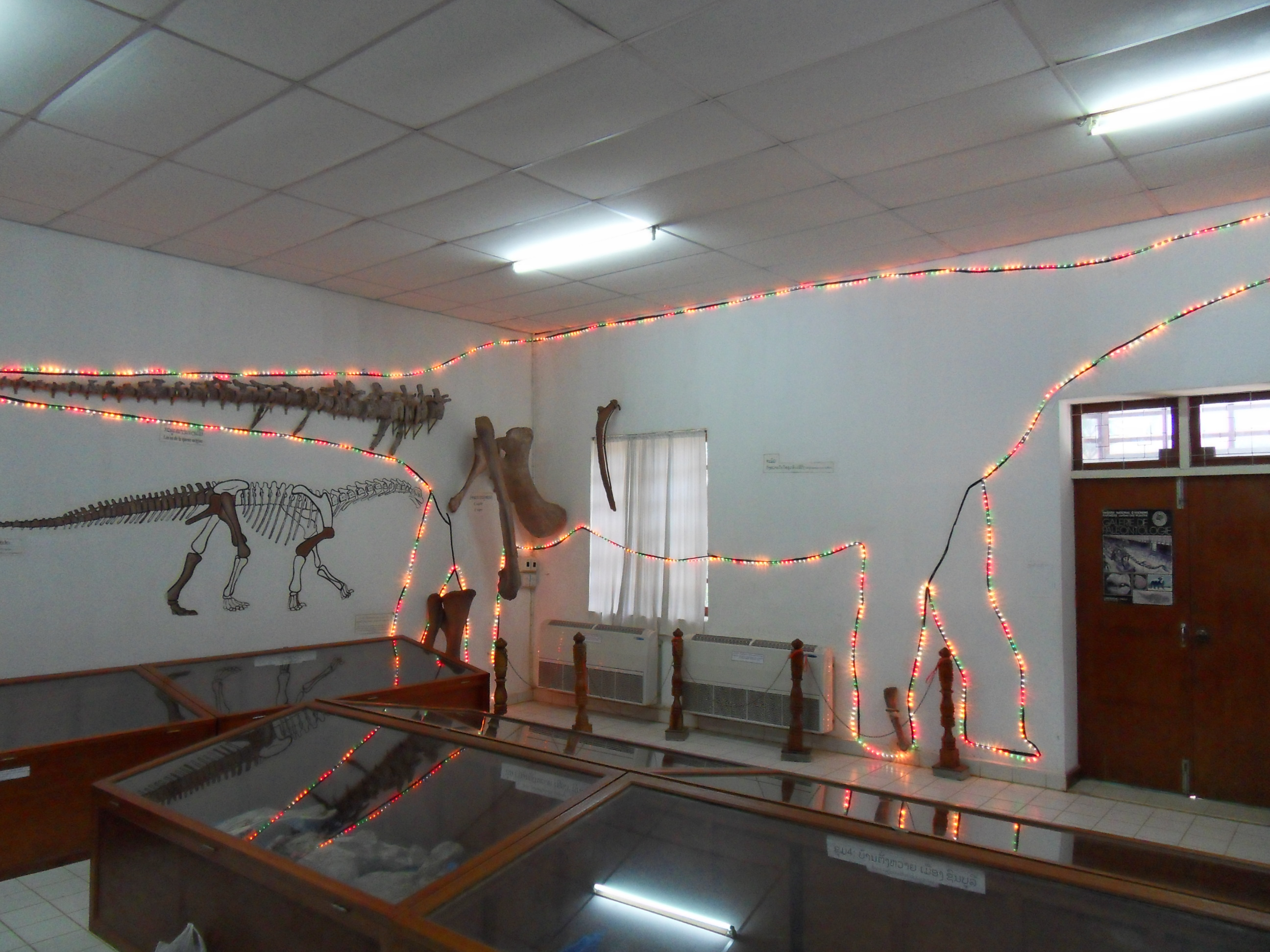
- Holotype of Tangvayosaurus, Dinosaur Museum, Savannakhet, Laos

Scientific classification
- Kingdom: Animalia
- Phylum: Chordata
- Class: Reptilia
- Clade: Dinosauria
- Clade: Saurischia
- Clade: †Sauropodomorpha
- Clade: †Sauropoda
- Clade: †Macronaria
- Family: †Euhelopodidae
- Genus: †Tangvayosaurus; Allain et al., 1999
- Species: †T. hoffeti

Binomial name
- †Tangvayosaurus hoffeti Allain et al., 1999

Synonyms
- Titanosaurus falloti (?) Hoffet, 1942

= Tangvayosaurus =

Tangvayosaurus Temporal range: Early Cretaceous, ~120–100 Ma

Extinct genus of dinosaurs

Tangvayosaurus (meaning "Tang Vay lizard") is a genus of sauropod dinosaur from the Lower Cretaceous (Aptian to Albian ages) Grès supérieurs Formation of Savannakhet Province, Laos. It was a basal somphospondylan, measuring about 15 m (49 ft) long, and is known from the remains of two or three individuals.

== Description ==
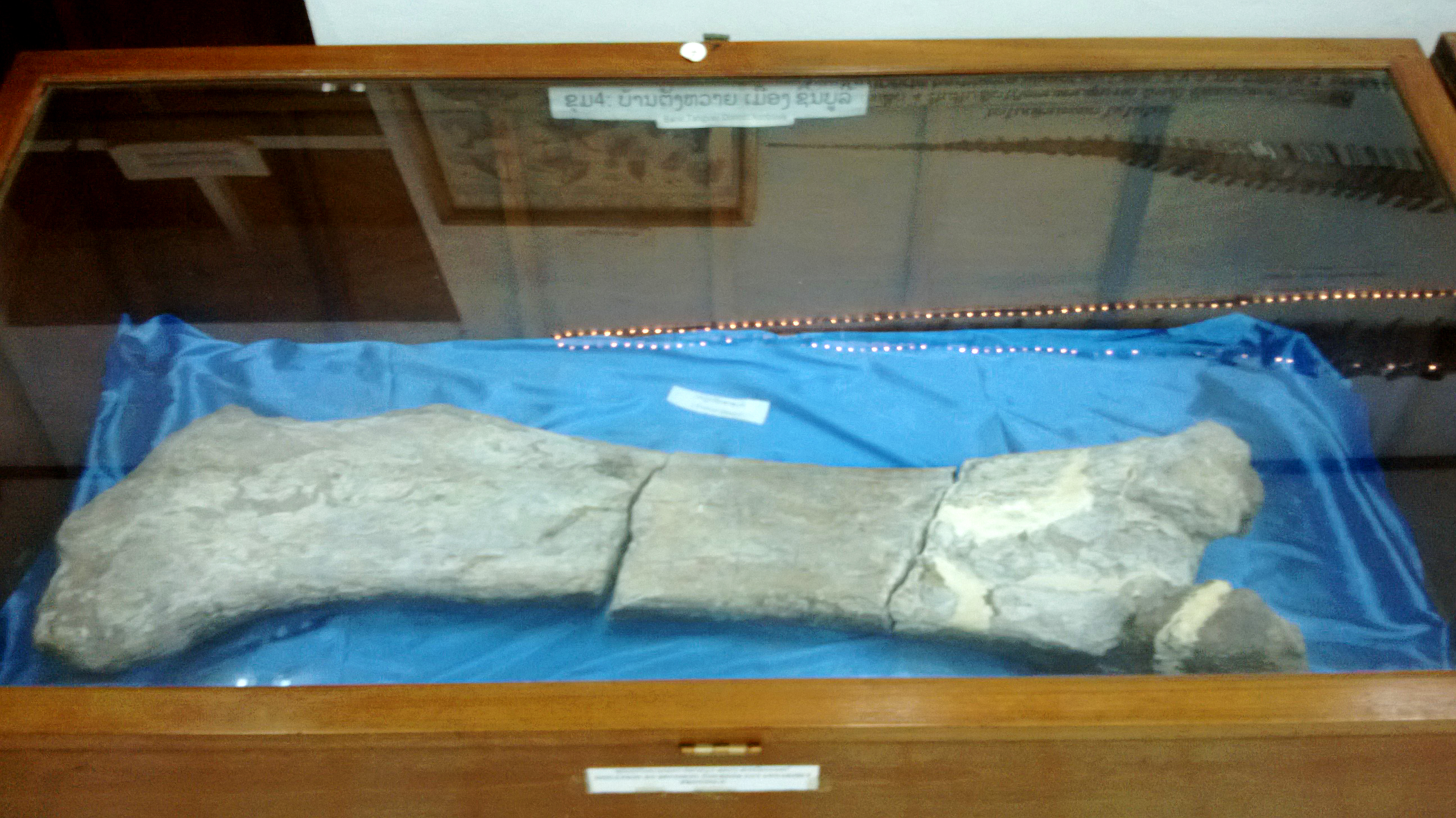
Femur

It is based on TV4-1 to TV4-36, consisting of a partial pelvis, several back vertebrae and a tail vertebra, ribs, and an upper arm bone (humerus). Another skeleton includes 38 tail vertebrae, a neck vertebra, and most of a hind limb. The type species, Tangvayosaurus hoffeti, was described by a group of a dozen scientists led by Ronan Allain in 1999 and the species name honours French palaeontologist Joshua Hoffet. Allain et al. also referred the old species "Titanosaurus" falloti (Hoffet, 1942), from the same formation and based on partial thigh bones and tail vertebrae, to their genus as T. sp. The most recent review tentatively retains the genus because it is different from the only other established sauropod from the same approximate time but found next door in Thailand (Phuwiangosaurus), but disagrees with adding T. falloti to it.

== Classification ==
Although consistently recovered within the Somphospondyli, the exact placement of Tangvayosaurus is debated. It was initially assigned by Allain et al. (1999) to the Titanosauria, who noted strong affinities to Phuwiangosaurus, which they also considered a titanosaur. A more recent review by Suteethorn et al. (2010) resolved both Tangvayosaurus and Phuwiangosaurus as more basal titanosauriforms. The cladogram below follows this analysis.

- Macronaria
  - Camarasaurus
  - Titanosauriformes
    - Brachiosaurus
    - - Phuwiangosaurus
      - Somphospondyli
        - Euhelopus
        - - Tangvayosaurus
          - Lithostrotia
            - Malawisaurus
            - Eutitanosauria
              - Nemegtosauridae
                - Nemegtosaurus
                - Rapetosaurus
              - - Isisaurus
                - Opisthocoelicaudiinae
                  - Alamosaurus
                  - Opisthocoelicaudia
                - Saltasaurinae
                  - Neuquensaurus
                  - Saltasaurus

D'Emic (2012) found that Tangvayosaurus was the sister taxon of Phuwiangosaurus within the Euhelopodidae.
