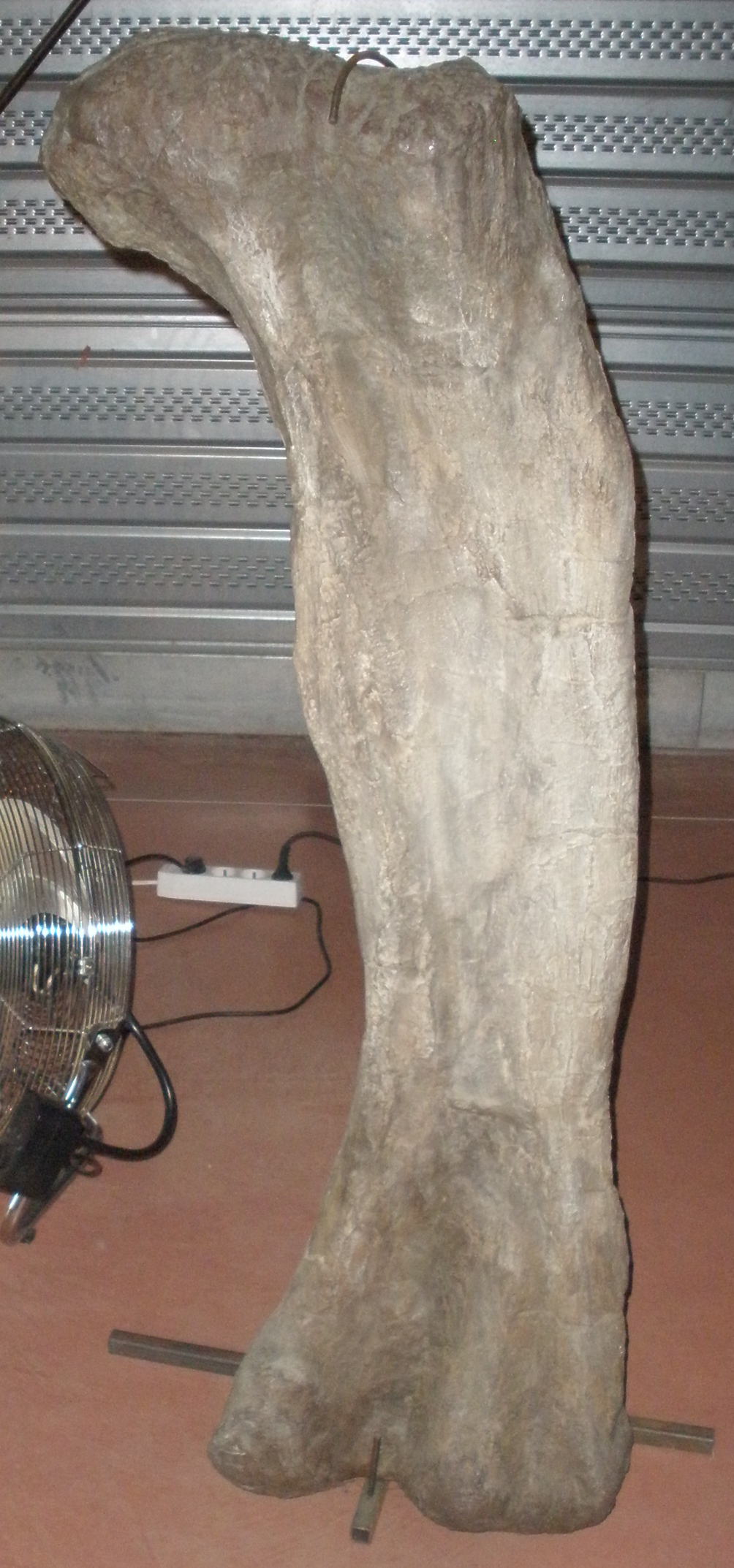
- Femur

Scientific classification
- Kingdom: Animalia
- Phylum: Chordata
- Class: Reptilia
- Clade: Dinosauria
- Clade: Saurischia
- Clade: †Sauropodomorpha
- Clade: †Sauropoda
- Clade: †Macronaria
- Family: †Euhelopodidae
- Genus: †Phuwiangosaurus; Martin, Buffetaut and Suteethorn, 1994
- Species: †P. sirindhornae

Binomial name
- †Phuwiangosaurus sirindhornae Martin, Buffetaut and Suteethorn, 1994

= Phuwiangosaurus =

Phuwiangosaurus Temporal range: late Valanginian-early Hauterivian, ~133.6–132.1 Ma

Extinct genus of dinosaurs

Phuwiangosaurus (meaning "Phu Wiang lizard") is a genus of titanosauriform dinosaur from the Early Cretaceous (Valanginian-Hauterivian) Sao Khua Formation of Thailand. The type species, P. sirindhornae, was described by Martin, Buffetaut, and Suteethorn in a 1993 press release and was formally named in 1994. The species was named to honor Princess Maha Chakri Sirindhorn of Thailand, who was interested in the geology and palaeontology of Thailand, while the genus was named after the Phu Wiang area, where the fossil was discovered. The precise affinities of Phuwiangosaurus among titanosauriform sauropods are uncertain, though several studies have classified it as a euhelopodid.

== Discovery and naming ==
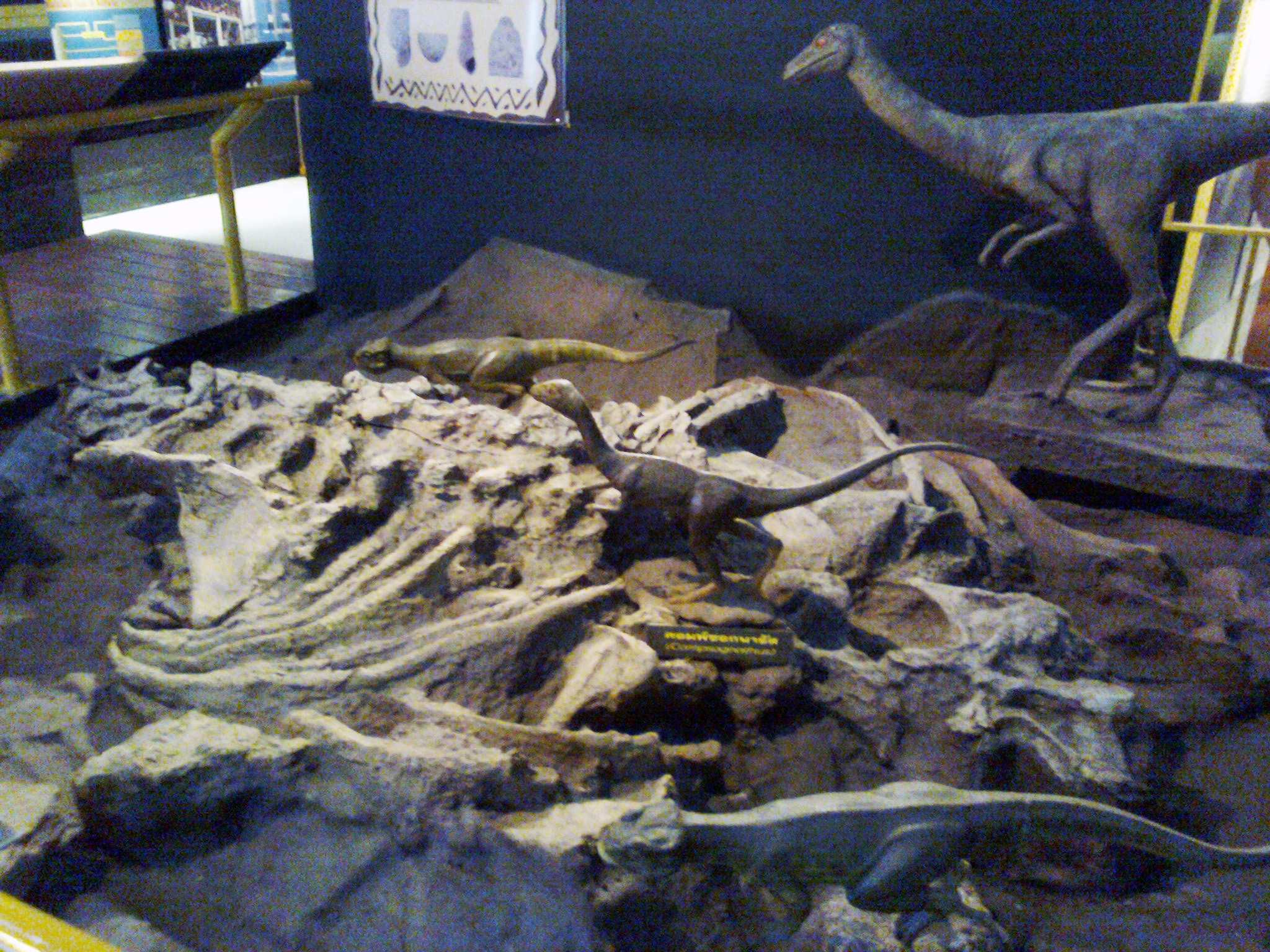
Fossil cast in Geological Resource Museum, Bangkok

The type specimen of Phuwiangosaurus sirindhornae was discovered in Phu Wiang National Park in 1982, and excavated and prepared over the next several years. The specimen was described as representing a new genus and species, Phuwiangosaurus sirindhornae, by Valérie Martin, Eric Buffetaut, and Varavudh Suteethorn in 1994. The genus name refers to its discovery in Phu Wiang, and the species name honors Princess Maha Chakri Sirindhorn of Thailand for her interest in the paleontology of the country.

Phuwiangosaurus sirindhornae is known from several specimens, all of which were found in the Sao Khua Formation of Thailand. The holotype, SM PW 1, is a partial skeleton of an adult individual, which consists of three cervical vertebrae, three dorsal vertebrae, ribs, a chevron, both scapulae, a coracoid, the left humerus, the left ulna, both ilia, ischia, pubes, and femora, and the left fibula. A dorsal vertebra and a caudal vertebra excavated at the same site years later probably belong to the same specimen. The most complete skeleton, SM K11, represents a half-grown individual and is about 60% complete, including a partial skull. Other partial skeletons and isolated bones have been described as well. In 2020, Cashmore et al. calculated that, overall, 65% of the skeletal anatomy of Phuwiangosaurus sirindhornae was known. Numerous bones of baby Phuwiangosaurus have been found, which is a rarity for sauropods. Though specimens of a wide range of ages are known, no old individuals that had reached their maximum body size are known.

== Description ==
Size compared to a human

Phuwiangosaurus was a mid-sized sauropod, roughly 15 to 20 metres (49 to 66 ft) long. Its mass has been estimated at 17 tonnes. The teeth are slender and peg-like, with the tooth height from base to tip being on average over four times greater than the width of the base of the tooth. They are slenderer than the teeth of other euhelopodids, with their proportions more closely resembling the teeth of diplodocoids and titanosaurs. The braincase of Phuwiangosaurus exhibits characteristics intermediate between those of basal somphospondyls and titanosaurs. The neck of Phuwiangosaurus was probably composed of 13 vertebrae. The lengths of the vertebrae increase up to the middle of the neck, with the eighth cervical vertebra being the longest, and then decrease again. The cervical neural spines are bifurcated from the seventh cervical vertebra onward. The sacrum was composed of five vertebrae.

== Classification ==
Phuwiangosaurus was originally assigned to Titanosauria, but more recent studies have placed it in a more basal position within the Titanosauriformes. Phylogenetic analyses presented by D'Emic (2012), Mannion et al. (2013), and Mocho et al. (2014) resolve Phuwiangosaurus within the Euhelopodidae, alongside genera such as Euhelopus and Tangvayosaurus. Other analyses have failed to find support for such a grouping, including some finding it to be paraphyletic at the base of Somphospondyli.

== Paleoecology ==
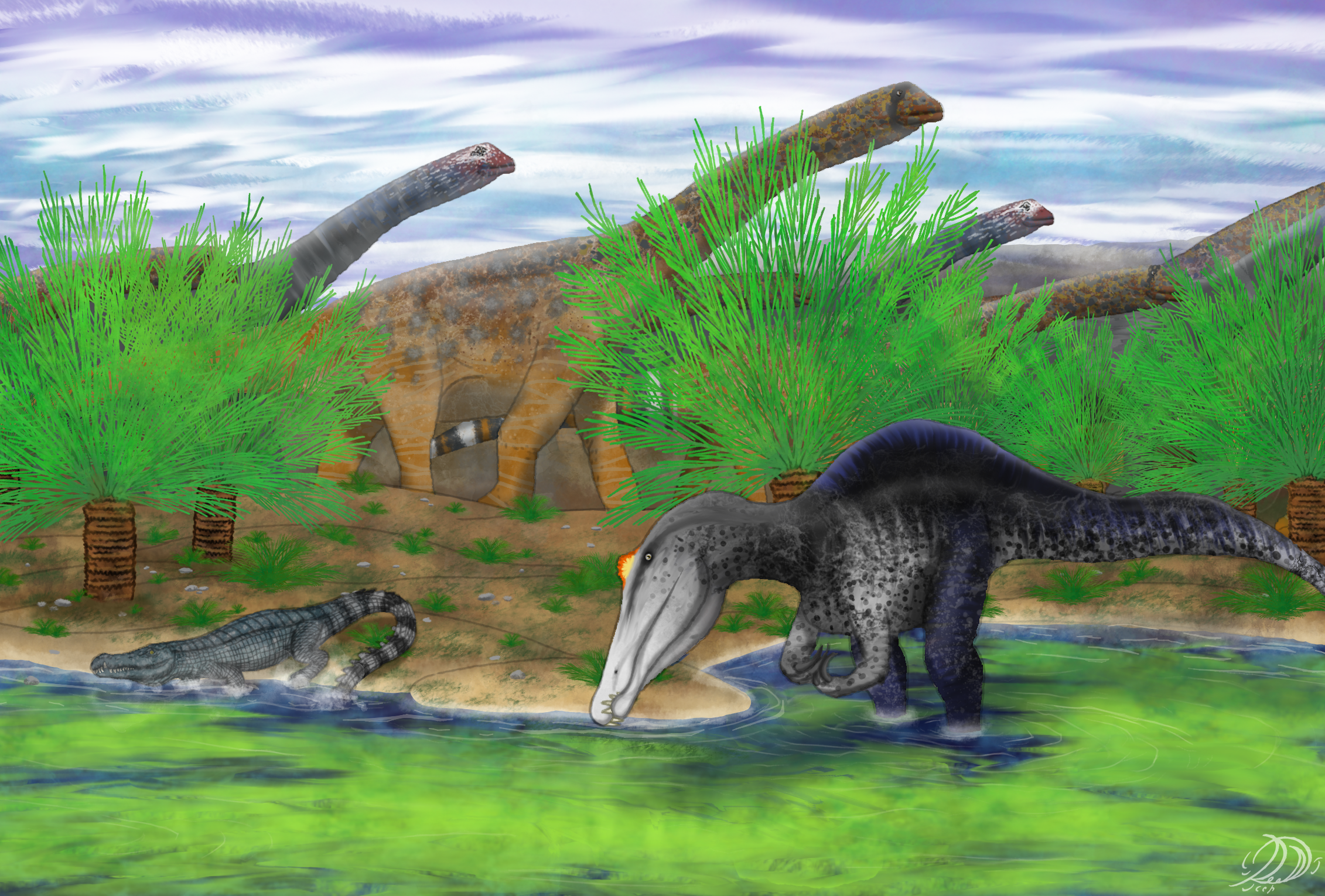
Life restoration of a Phuwiangosaurus herd in the Sao Khua Formation environment, with the spinosaurid dinosaur Siamosaurus (right) and the crocodyliform Sunosuchus (middle left)

The Sao Khua Formation, where fossils of Phuwiangosaurus have been found, was deposited 133.6 to 132.1 million years ago, and represents a floodplain environment in a humid, subtropical climate. The Sao Khua dinosaur assemblage includes the large theropods Siamotyrannus, Phuwiangvenator, Vayuraptor, and Siamosaurus, and the ornithomimosaur Kinnareemimus. Other unidentified sauropods, different from Phuwiangosaurus, were present in the ecosystem. These sauropods include a Euhelopus-like taxon and a possible brachiosaurid. Ornithischian dinosaurs are not known from the Sao Khua Formation, although they are known from roughly contemporary environments in other parts of Asia. Non-dinosaurian members of the fauna included crocodilians, turtles, fish, and sharks. There is evidence that theropods fed on Phuwiangosaurus.
