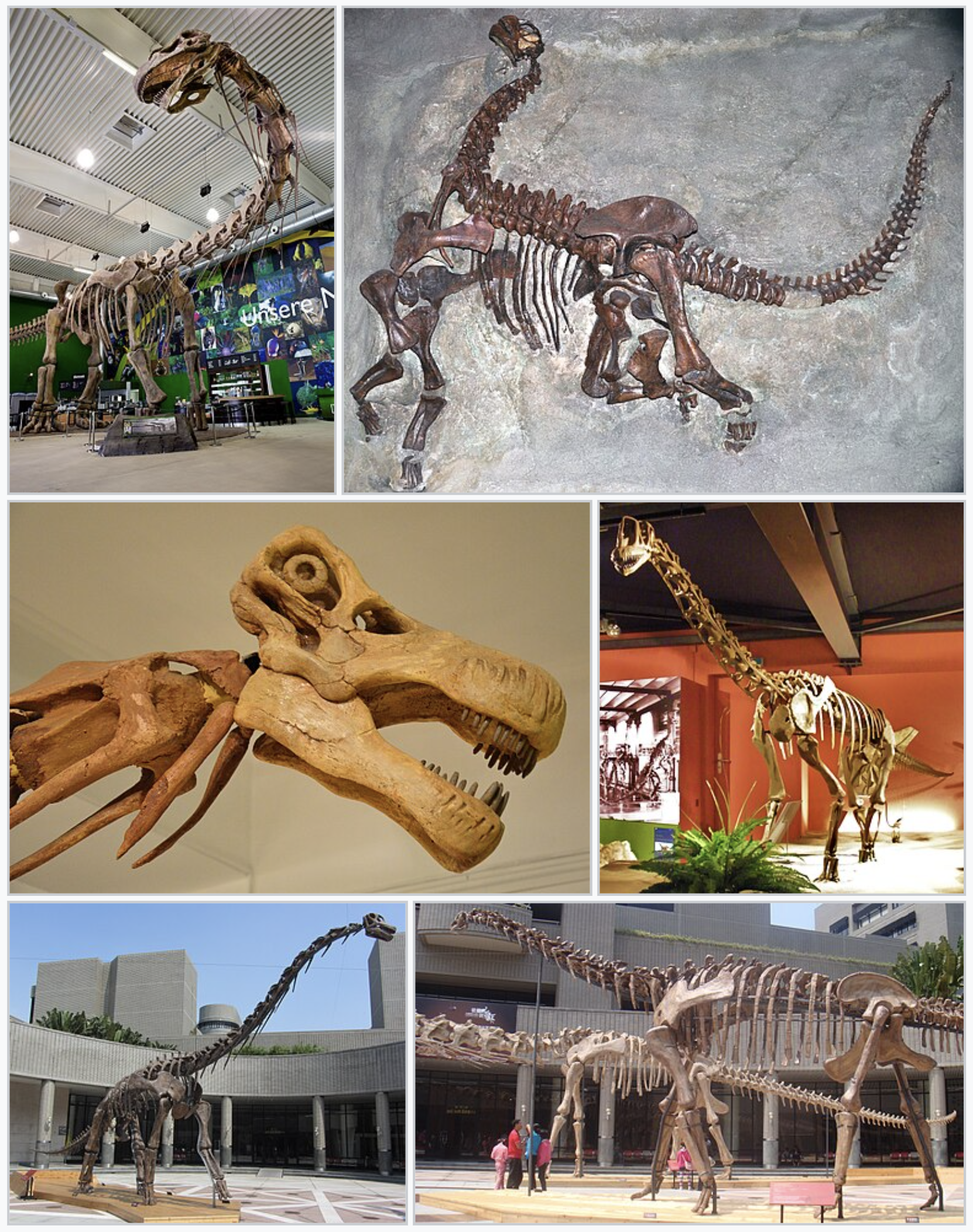
- Seven macronarian sauropods (top left to bottom right): Argentinosaurus, Camarasaurus lentus, Nemegtosaurus, Europasaurus, Qiaowanlong, Huanghetitan (foreground) with Daxiatitan (background)

Scientific classification
- Kingdom: Animalia
- Phylum: Chordata
- Class: Reptilia
- Clade: Dinosauria
- Clade: Saurischia
- Clade: †Sauropodomorpha
- Clade: †Sauropoda
- Clade: †Eusauropoda
- Clade: †Neosauropoda
- Clade: †Macronaria; Wilson & Sereno, 1998

Clades and subclades
- †Abrosaurus; †Aragosaurus; †Bashunosaurus?; †Bicharracosaurus; †Ceratocaudia; †Dashanpusaurus?; †Haestasaurus; †Janenschia; †Lapparentosaurus?; †Marmarospondylus?; †Triunfosaurus; †Yuzhoulong; †Camarasauromorpha Upchurch et al. 2004; †Camarasauridae; †Titanosauriformes; †Astrodon; †"Brachiosaurus" nougaredi; †Brohisaurus?; †Duriatitan; †Eucamerotus; †Fukuititan; †Fushanosaurus; †Fusuisaurus; †Huanghetitan; †Jiutaisaurus; †Oceanotitan; †Ornithopsis; †Pukyongosaurus; †Rugocaudia; †Brachiosauridae; †Somphospondyli

= Macronaria =

Macronarians Temporal range: Middle Jurassic–Late Cretaceous, 174–66 Ma

Extinct clade of dinosaurs

Macronaria is a clade of sauropod dinosaurs. Macronarians are named after the large diameter of the nasal opening of their skull, known as the external naris, which exceeded the size of the orbit, the skull opening where the eye is located (hence macro- meaning large, and –naria meaning nose). Fossil evidence suggests that macronarian dinosaurs lived from the Middle Jurassic (Bathonian) through the Late Cretaceous (Maastrichtian). Macronarians have been found globally, including discoveries in Argentina, the United States, Portugal, China, and Tanzania. Like other sauropods, they are known to have inhabited primarily terrestrial areas, and little evidence exists to suggest that they spent much time in coastal environments. Macronarians are diagnosed through their distinct characters on their skulls, as well as appendicular and vertebral characters. Macronaria is composed of several subclades and families notably including Camarasauridae and Titanosauriformes, among several others. Titanosauriforms are particularly well known for being some of the largest terrestrial animals to ever exist.

Macronaria was described by Wilson and Sereno who proposed the new subdivisions among the clade Neosauropoda. Previously, this clade was thought to have Brachiosaurus and Camarasauridae forming one sister group, and Titanosauroidea and Diplodocoidea forming another. This proposed shift with Macronaria placed Diplodocoidea as an outgroup to the new clade Macronaria, under which all other neosauropods would fall.

== Anatomy ==
The following list includes some of the distinguishing characteristics that are diagnostic for Macronaria:

- The long axis of the distal ischial shaft lie on the same plane
- Middle and posterior neural spines have distal ends that extend out transversely
- Posterior neural spines extend at the tip forming a triangular process upwards.
- The anterior chevrons of the tail have open proximal articulation
- Robust, spatulate (spoon-like), and broad-crowned teeth
- Crests formed by large protruding nasal
- Elongate metacarpals
- Forelimbs are relatively long in comparison to the hind limbs (most clearly demonstrated by brachiosaurs)

== Paleobiology ==
=== Posture, body size, and locomotion ===
The posture of macronarians is characterized by a novel ‘wide-gauged’ locomotor style, particularly in titanosaurs. While sauropods are known to be the giants of the dinosaurs, macronarians were not exclusively large-bodied. Macronarians show divergence in the evolution of body size with some members both increasing and decreasing in size from the primitive condition. For example, despite all being in the titanosaur clade, Argentinosaurus reached enormous sizes (~50 tons), while Saltasaurus and Magyarosaurus reached only 1.5-3 metric tons, which is fairly small for sauropods. While some macronarians represent some of the largest terrestrial vertebrates ever known, other macronarians experienced a steady size decrease over time.

=== Biogeography ===
Sauropods, widely speaking, have been associated with both coastal and inland environments. It is believed that macronarians such as titanosaurs were strictly terrestrial and associated with inland environments such as lacustrine systems. These findings are based on ‘wide-gauged’ trackways produced by titanosaurs which are strongly correlated with terrestrial sediments. It is also believed that macronarians have Gondwanan origins. A possible camarasauromorph of indeterminate genus and species was reported from the Middle Jurassic Khadir Formation of India, representing the oldest member of camarasauromorpha. Camarasaurus is among the most commonly found dinosaur from the Late Jurassic deposits of the Morrison Formation in the US. Unlike Camarasaurus, Titanosaurs were most commonly found in the Southern Hemisphere with the exception of Alamosaurus which was found in North America. There is strong geologic evidence that a land bridge between South and North America existed at the end of the Cretaceous allowing for dispersal of organisms between the two landmasses. Cretaceous sauropods are thought to have moved northward from South America, thus explaining the high density of South American sauropods, and the sole appearance of Alamosaurus in the Western Interior.

=== Diet ===
It is well established that all sauropods, including macronarians, were obligate herbivores. Unlike their sister group, the diplodocids, which were thought to feed on low-lying plants, camarasaurids and other macronarians likely had strongly upward-oriented necks for browsing trees and taller plants. Each tooth family in Camarasaurus is thought to have had a maximum of three replacement teeth and tooth formation took about 315 days. The replacement rate is thought to be one tooth every 62 days – this is about the same level or higher than non-sauropod herbivores, though it is lower than the replacement rates of the sister taxa, Diplodocus. It is thought that this may be related to the fact that the low-browsing taxa ingested more grit and thus needed to replace teeth more, while Camarasaurus and other macronarians fed on mid to upper canopy plants where exogenous grit is almost non-existent. Given the large body size of these neosauropod herbivores, it is thought that this type of niche partitioning, characterized by different species taking advantage of different resources, was necessary for coexistence.

It was at one point believed that polished pebbles occasionally found with sauropod skeletons were gastroliths. Gastroliths are stones intentionally swallowed to aid with digestion (as is seen in a variety of modern birds). However, more recent taphonomic and sedimentological evidence suggests that sauropods did not use stones for digestion due to the general rarity of finding gastric mill-like stones with sauropod remains, and low relative mass of the stones to the size of sauropod bodies. When gastrolith-like rocks are found with sauropods, it may be that they were accidentally ingested, or intentionally ingested for mineral uptake.

== Phylogeny ==
Macronaria is nested within Neosauropoda and is sister to Diplodocoidea. These groups split around the mid- to late-Jurassic and end at the K/Pg boundary. In the less than 100 Myr that they lived, macronarians developed at least 216 synapomorphies and autapomorphies. Despite the fact that macronarians are named after cranial openings, they are described by more appendicular synapomorphies. The species that survived late into the Cretaceous were characterized by stocky, wide-gauged posture, most notably the highly derived saltasaurines. Also under Macronaria are Camarasaurus, Brachiosaurus, and Titanosauria. Camarasauromorpha is the most basal group of Macronaria.

The cladogram below follows José Luis Barco Rodríguez (2010).

- Macronaria
  - Camarasauridae
  - - Laurasiformes
      - Galvesaurus
      - - Phuwiangosaurus
        - - Aragosaurus
          - - Tastavinsaurus
            - Venenosaurus
    - Titanosauriformes
      - Brachiosaurus
      - - Euhelopus
        - Titanosauria

The cladogram below follows José L. Carballido, Oliver W. M. Rauhut, Diego Pol and Leonardo Salgado (2011).

- Camarasauromorpha
  - Camarasaurus
  - - Europasaurus
    - - - Galvesaurus
        - Tehuelchesaurus
      - - - Janenschia
          - Tastavinsaurus
        - - Euhelopus
          - - - Chubutisaurus
              - Wintonotitan
            - Titanosauriformes
              - Brachiosauridae
              - - Phuwiangosaurus
                - Titanosauria

Simplified cladogram of Macronaria after D'Emic (2012).

- Macronaria
  - Camarasauridae
  - - Tehuelchesaurus
    - Titanosauriformes
      - Brachiosauridae
      - Somphospondyli
        - Euhelopodidae
        - Chubutisaurus
        - Titanosauria

For alternative cladograms see also Mateus et al. (2011), Mannion et al. (2013).
