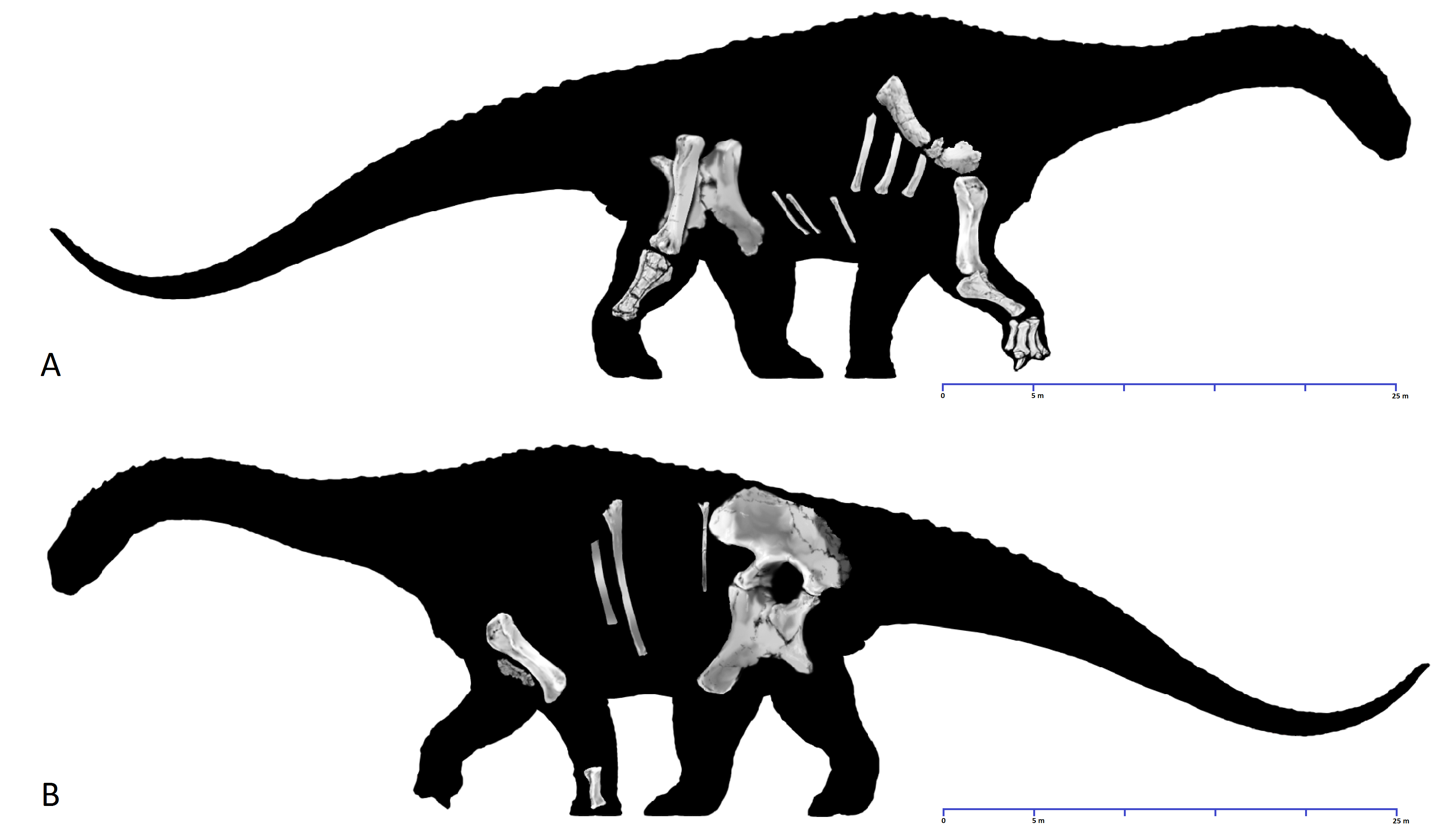
- Holotype skeleton in (a) right and (b) left views

Scientific classification
- Kingdom: Animalia
- Phylum: Chordata
- Class: Reptilia
- Clade: Dinosauria
- Clade: Saurischia
- Clade: †Sauropodomorpha
- Clade: †Sauropoda
- Clade: †Macronaria
- Clade: †Somphospondyli
- Clade: †Diamantinasauria
- Genus: †Diamantinasaurus; Hocknull et al., 2009
- Species: †D. matildae

Binomial name
- †Diamantinasaurus matildae Hocknull et al., 2009

= Diamantinasaurus =

Diamantinasaurus Temporal range: Late Cretaceous, 95–92.9 Ma

Extinct genus of reptiles

Diamantinasaurus is a genus of titanosaurian sauropod from Australia that lived during the early Late Cretaceous, about 94 million years ago. The type species of the genus is D. matildae, first described and named in 2009 by Scott Hocknull and colleagues based on fossil finds in the Winton Formation. Meaning "Diamantina lizard", the name is derived from the location of the nearby Diamantina River and the Greek word sauros, "lizard". The specific epithet is from the Australian song Waltzing Matilda, also the locality of the holotype and paratype. The known skeleton includes most of the forelimb, shoulder girdle, pelvis, hindlimb and ribs of the holotype, and one shoulder bone, a radius and some vertebrae of the paratype.

== History of discovery ==
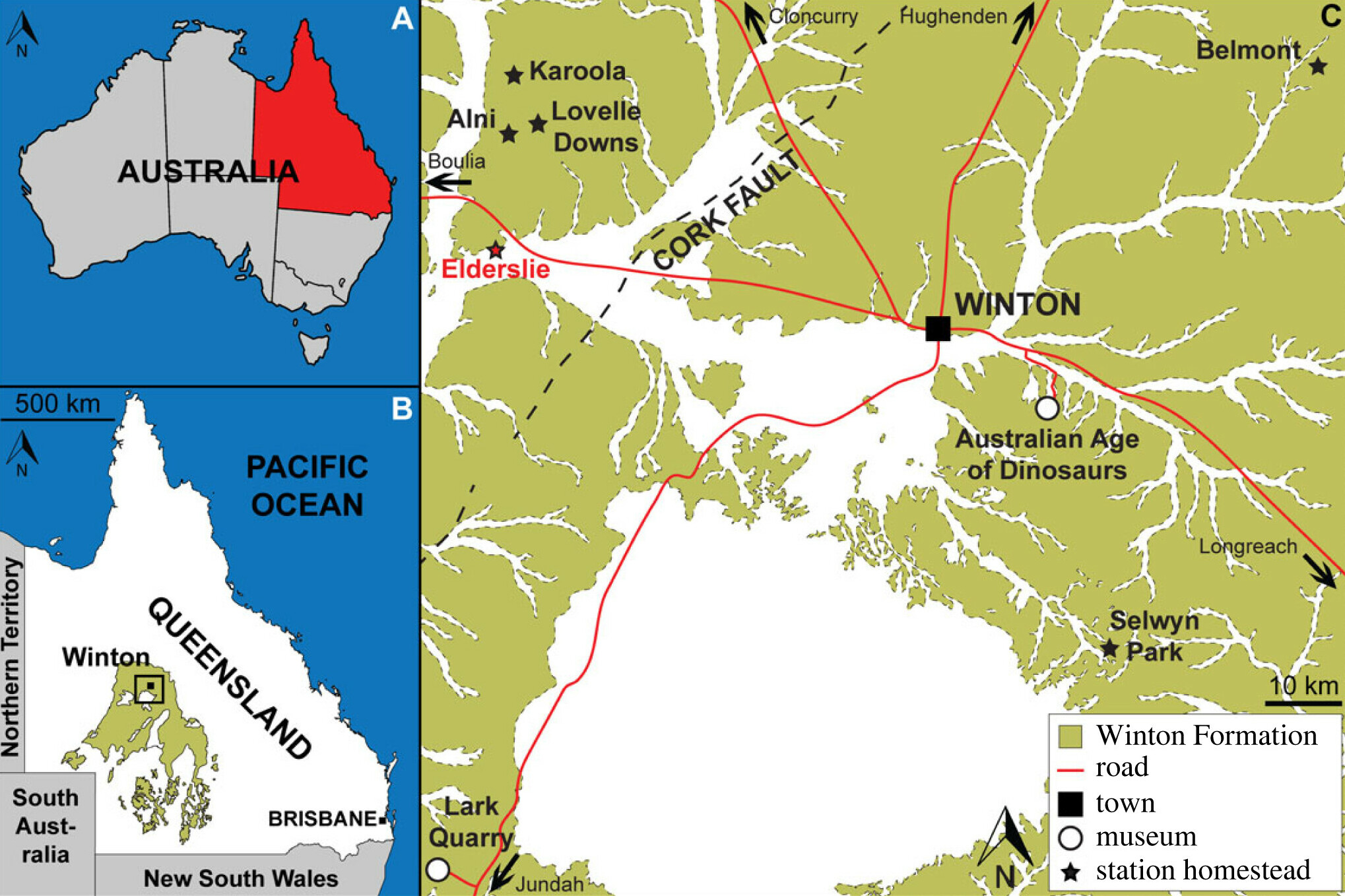
Map showing Winton Formation outcrops and locations where Diamantinasaurus specimens have been found

The holotype of Diamantinasaurus was first uncovered over four seasons of excavations near Winton, Queensland, Australia. The bones were found alongside the holotype of Australovenator and crocodylomorphs and molluscs. The two dinosaurs found, known from specimens catalogued as AODF 0603 and 0604 were described in 2009 by Scott Hocknull and his colleagues. Specimen AODF 0603 became the basis for the genus Diamantinasaurus, and the species D. matildae. The species name is a reference to the song "Waltzing Matilda", written by Banjo Paterson in Winton, while the generic name is derived from the Diamantina River, running nearby the type locality combined with the Greek sauros, meaning "lizard". AODF 0603, the holotype, includes the right scapula, both humeri, right ulna, both incomplete hands, dorsal ribs and gastralia, partial pelvis, and the right hindlimb missing the foot. The paratype, under the same specimen, includes dorsal and sacral vertebrae, the right sternal plate now thought to represent the remainder of a coracoid, a radius, and one manual phalanx. All these bones come from AODL 85, nicknamed the "Matilda Site" at Elderslie Sheep Station, located about 60 km (37 mi) west-northwest from Winton in central Queensland. This locality is in the upper midsection of the Winton Formation, which dates to the Cenomanian of the Late Cretaceous.

The discovery of Diamantinasaurus ended a pause in the discovery of new dinosaurs in Australia, as the first sauropod named in over 75 years. Along with Australovenator, the holotype of Diamantinasaurus has been nicknamed after the Australian song "Waltzing Matilda", with Australovenator being called "Banjo" and Diamantinasaurus being nicknamed "Matilda". Wintonotitan, also from the site, was dubbed "Clancy". The find was apparently the largest dinosaur discovery in Australia that was documented since that of Muttaburrasaurus in 1981.

As of 2025, additional specimens have been described since its initial description, with each specimen being nicknamed as the following: "Alex" for AODF 0836, "Oliver" for AODF 0663, "Ann" for AODF 0906, "Devil Dave" for AODF 0666, "Ian" for AODF 0844 and "Judy" for AODF 0888. The second specimen, AODF 0836, was first described in 2016. It includes portions of the skull, including a left squamosal, nearly complete braincase, right surangular, and various fragments. Additionally, the specimen also includes the atlas, axis, five other cervical vertebrae, three dorsal vertebrae, additional dorsal ribs, portions of the hip, and another right scapula. In 2021, this referred material was thoroughly described. In 2022, the right dentary fragment with teeth and isolated tooth crown was referred to AODF 0603, while the isolated tooth, AODF 2298, was tentatively suggested to be part of the same individual as AODF 0836. In the same year, the third specimen, AODF 663, was referred to as a juvenile specimen. In 2023, the fourth specimen, AODF 0906, consisting of a partial postcranial skeleton and a more complete skull with previously unknown numerous cranial elements intact has been described in detail. In 2024, the fifth and sixth specimen, AODF 0666 and AODF 0844, consisting of the incomplete hindlimb and scapulocoracoid respectively have been described. In 2025, the seventh specimen, AODF 0888, consisting of a partial cranial and postcranial skeleton with the first known fossilized gut content among all sauropods and the skin preserving polygonal (mostly hexagonal) scales has been described.

== Description ==
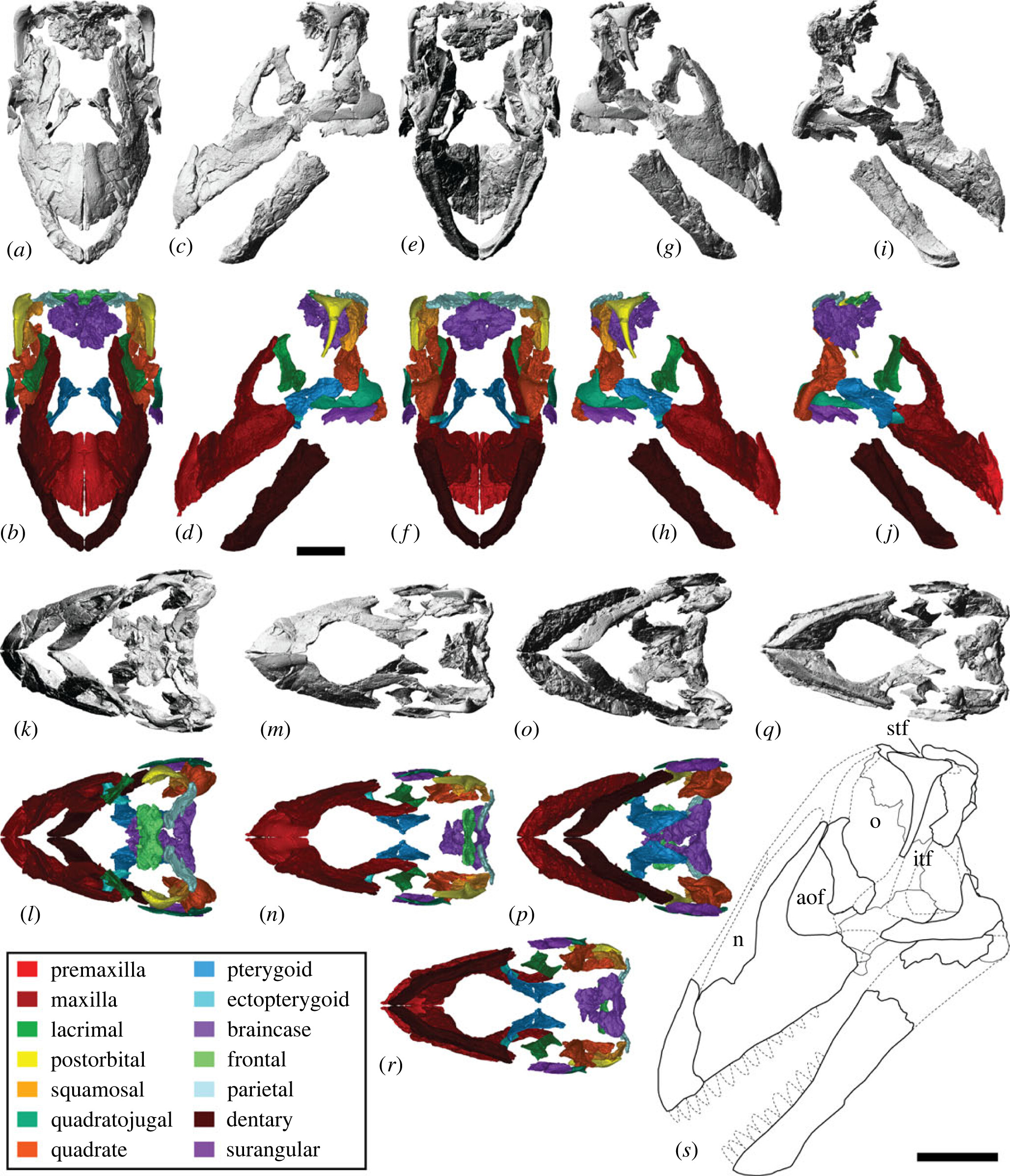
3D scans and reconstruction of skull AODF 0906

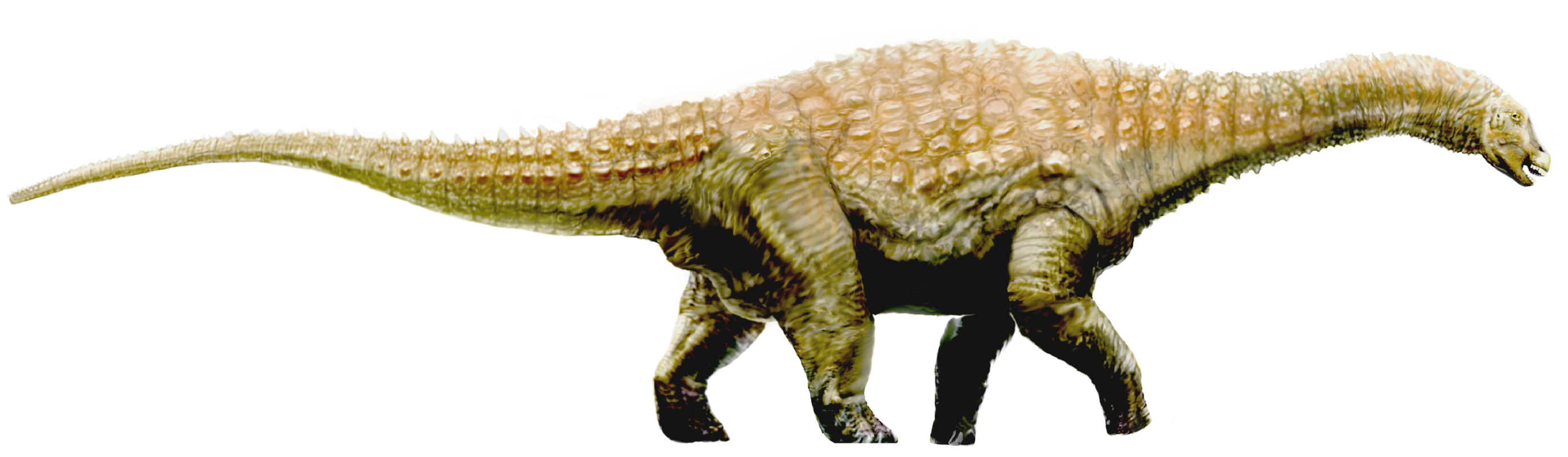
Life restoration

Diamantinasaurus was a medium-sized titanosaurian, measuring 16 m (52 ft) long and weighing up to 25 t (28 short tons). Like other sauropods, Diamantinasaurus would have been a large quadrupedal herbivore. Since the original description, the only major revisions include the misidentification of the "sternal plate", misplacement of manual phalanges III-1 and IV-1 as III-1 and V-1 respectively, and the identification of the missing portion of the fibula.

=== Skull ===
Before 2023, the skull of Diamantinasaurus was incompletely known like most other titanosaurs, with only the posterior skull roof and braincase being preserved. Similarly to Saltasaurus and Rapetosaurus and unlike Nemegtosaurus, the supratemporal fenestra was bordered by the frontal bone. Contrasting from both latter genera, Diamantinasaurus has a low supraoccipital above the cranial foramen, which is subsequently less than 1.5 times the height of the basal tuberae (which has a foramen). All of these traits are however shared with Saltasaurus. Multiple other traits are found throughout derived titanosaurs, including downward angling of the skull, prong shaped lateral braincase processes, an undisturbed pituitary fossa, and a more centrally located opening for the internal carotid artery.

In 2023, Poropat and colleagues described a new specimen AODF 0906, which preserved the more complete skull with an estimated total length of approximately 50 centimetres (20 in). The referral of this specimen to Diamantinasaurus is supported by some of the nearly identical structures including the parietal, prootic and surangular when compared to AODF 0836. The skull was overall more similar in shape to that of brachiosaurids than derived titanosaurs, and it had similar features to those on the known cranial material of the Argentinian titanosaur Sarmientosaurus which confirmed their previously assumed close phylogenetic relationship. The left premaxilla of the skull preserved four tooth positions and five compressed cone-chisel-shaped replacement teeth, with the latter being nearly identical to other teeth material from the same formation previously attributed to this taxon. No loose teeth or active teeth were reported from this skull. The absence of maxillary processes on the premaxilla could be either a genuine trait or a lost part of the specimen.

=== Vertebrae ===
As is typical for Titanosauriformes, all cervical and dorsal vertebrae of Diamantinasaurus are opisthocoelous and camellate (many small internal chambers). The axis vertebra of the genus is short, a potential characteristic of Saltasauridae. Contrasting Saltasaurus and Rapetosaurus however, the prezygapophyses of Diamantinasaurus extend in front of the centrum. Only certain in the known middle dorsals, the postspinal lamina (ridge on posterior surface of spine) extends below the spine itself. Like more basal sauropods Europasaurus and Euhelopus, the dorsal vertebrae have a notch on the top of the posterior centrum face, giving it a heart-shaped appearance, contrasting more derived titanosaurs or Giraffatitan which possess flattened centra. Although differing in centrum shape, Opisthocoelicaudia and Diamantinasaurus are the only titanosaurs to share a ventral keel set within a sharply defined depression under the dorsals. Dorsal prezygapophyses are linked to the spine by a spinoprezygapophyseal lamina, which is absent in Opisthocoelicaudia and most dorsals of Rapetosaurus, and the postzygodiapophyseal lamina found in Diamantinasaurus is also absent in most derived titanosaurs. There is no indication of a hyposphene-hypantrum articulation, a diagnostic feature of derived titanosaurs. Shared with Opisthocoelicaudia, Alamosaurus and Lirainosaurus to the exclusion of other titanosaurs, Diamantinasaurus has a simple undivided ridge between the posterior centrum and diapophysis (posterior centrodiapophyseal lamina). A poorly preserved feature between the prezygapophysis and centrum may be the posterior centroprezygapophyseal lamina, found in some brachiosaurids, basal titanosaurs, and Opisthocoelicaudia. Diamantinasaurus possessed at least five, possibly six, sacral vertebrae.

=== Forelimb ===
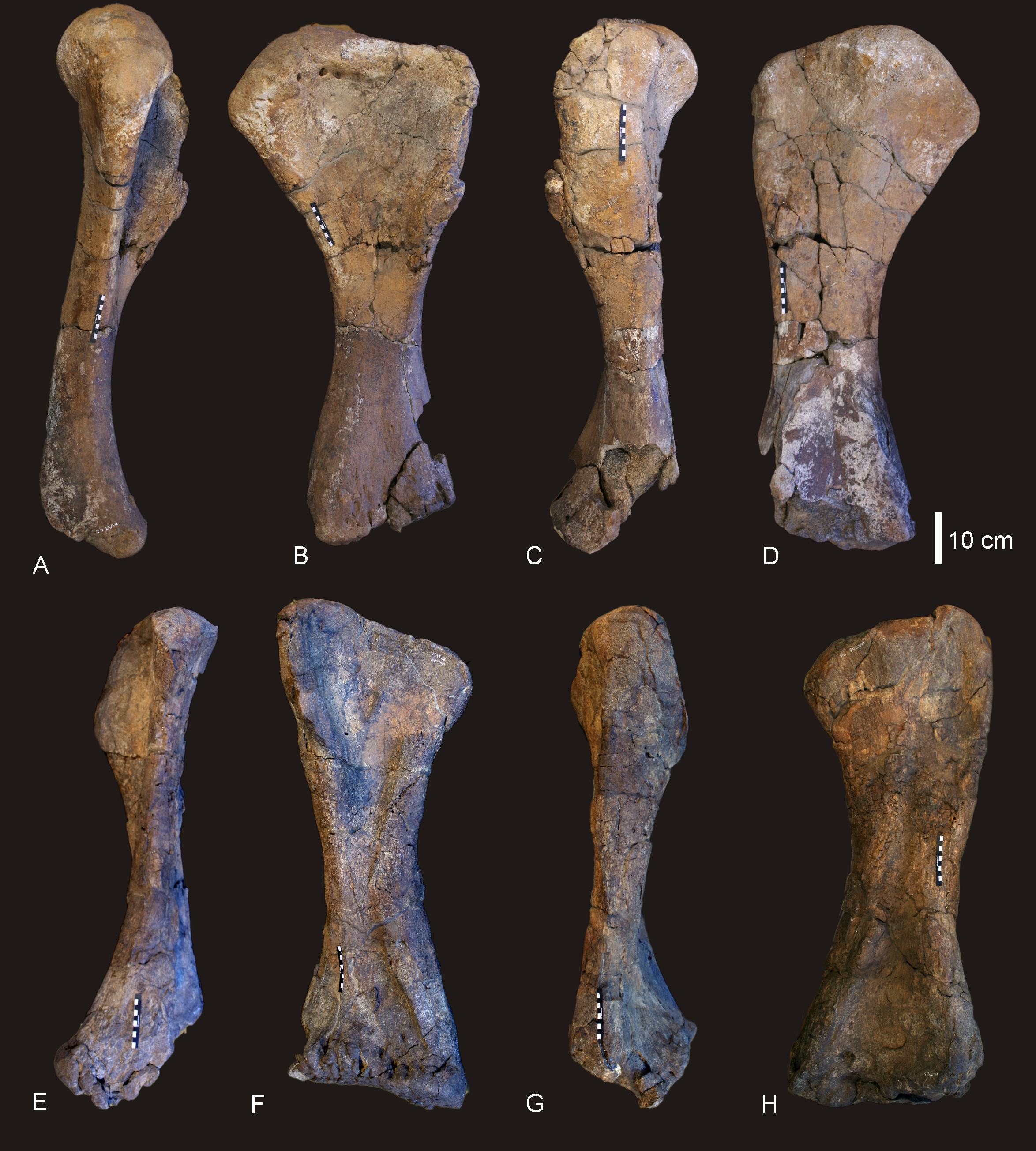
Left (top) and right (bottom) humeri in multiple views

Almost all the right forelimb is known from Diamantinasaurus, although the left humerus is known in addition to the right, and the left first metacarpal is known while the right is unpreserved. Diagnostic of Diamantinasaurus, the glenoid (humerus) articulation of the scapula is rotated to the outside, differing from all other somphospondylans. Similar to Alamosaurus and taxa around the base of Titanosauria, at least a single ventral process is known, although it is poorly preserved. The scapula of Diamantinasaurus is robust, having a more round cross-section than other somphospondylans. The coracoid, misidentified as a sternal in the original description, is plain and unfeatured, contrasting Huabeisaurus, Lirainosaurus and Opisthocoelicaudia. The proximal surface of the 1.068 m (3.50 ft) humerus is prominently curved as in the derived titanosaurs Opisthocoelicaudia and Saltasaurus. The lateral corner is also squared, placing it within Somphospondyli. Like with most somphospondylans but unlike Euhelopus and Rapetosaurus, Diamantinasaurus has a middle-shifted deltopectoral crest. Ridges for muscle attachment are less developed than in Opisthocoelicaudia and Magyarosaurus. Differing from derived titanosaurs, the condyles to articulate with the forearm are not pronounced. Diamantinasaurus has an ulna comparing to derived titanosaurs in the level of robustness, as well as having a very pronounced olecranon. Similarly, the radius of Diamantinasaurus is more robust than all titanosaurs except Opisthocoelicaudia. The ulna is 70 cm (28 in) long, while the radius is 67.5 cm (26.6 in).

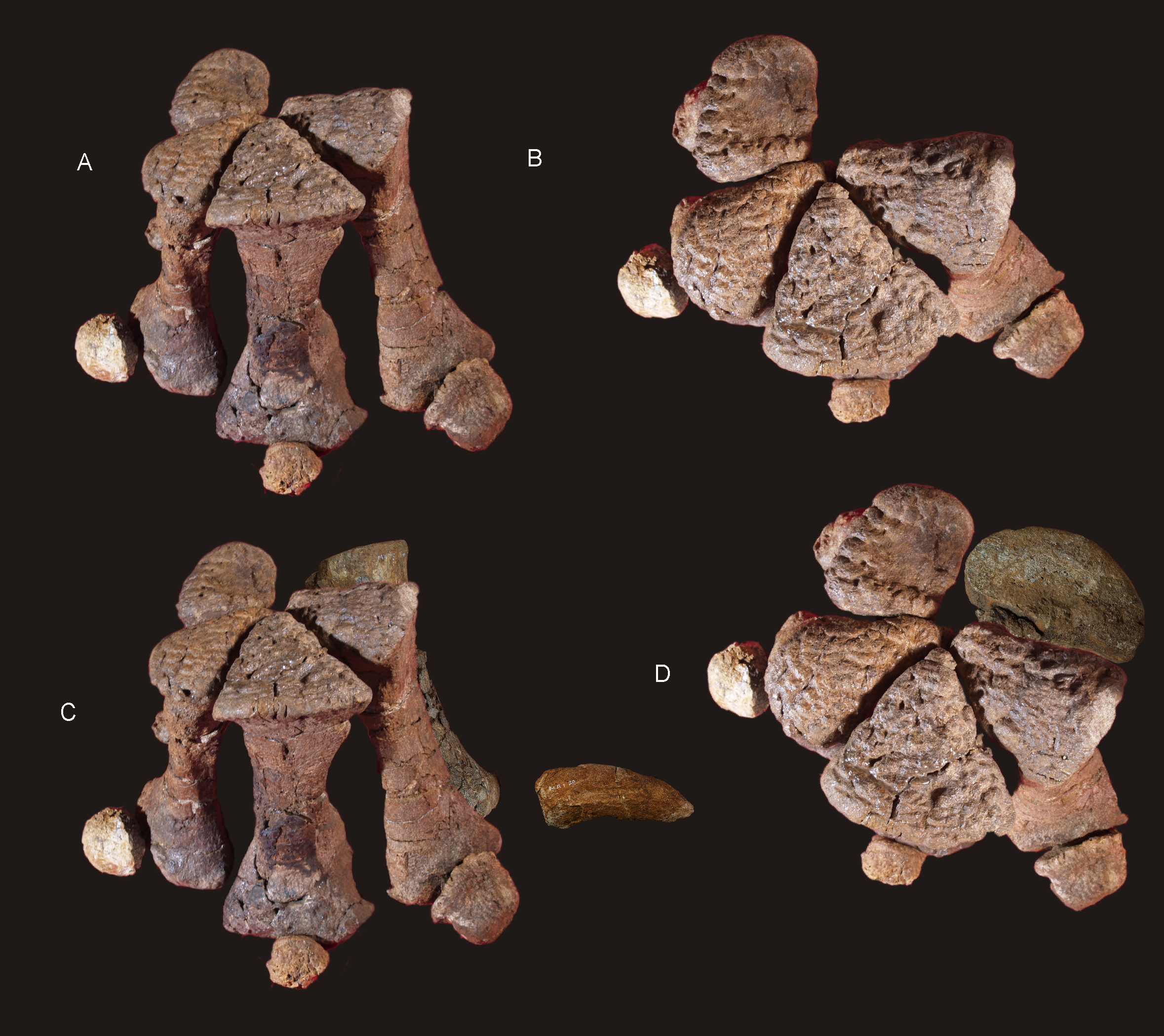
Articulated manus of Diamantinasaurus displaying all preserved phalanges

Because of the completeness of the forelimb material, the absence of carpal bones among the preserved material was presumed by Poropat et al. (2014) to be related to their genuine absence in life, as in Opisthocoelicaudia and Alamosaurus. The manus of Diamantinasaurus comparatively displays some plesiomorphic features, including: the middle metacarpal being the longest (41.2 cm (16.2 in) Mc III compared to next longest 37.5 cm (14.8 in) Mc II); the presence of a thumb claw; and the presence of multiple phalanges, having the phalangeal formula 2–1–1–1–1. However, the manus of Diamantinasaurus is completely cylindrical and vertical like other titanosaurs. The presence of large numbers of phalanges in Diamantinasaurus was used by Poropat et al. (2014) to suggest that all titanosaurs actually had ossified phalanges contrasting earlier studies. Following this logic, they suggested that for Opisthocoelicaudia and Epachthosaurus, which both preserve a single phalanx from the fourth finger, the absence of others was due to them being lost before fossilization for the preceding digits, instead of absence. The complete absence of preserved phalanges in Alamosaurus, Rapetosaurus, Neuquensaurus and Saltasaurus potentially being due to disarticulation instead of absence of ossification.

=== Hindlimb ===
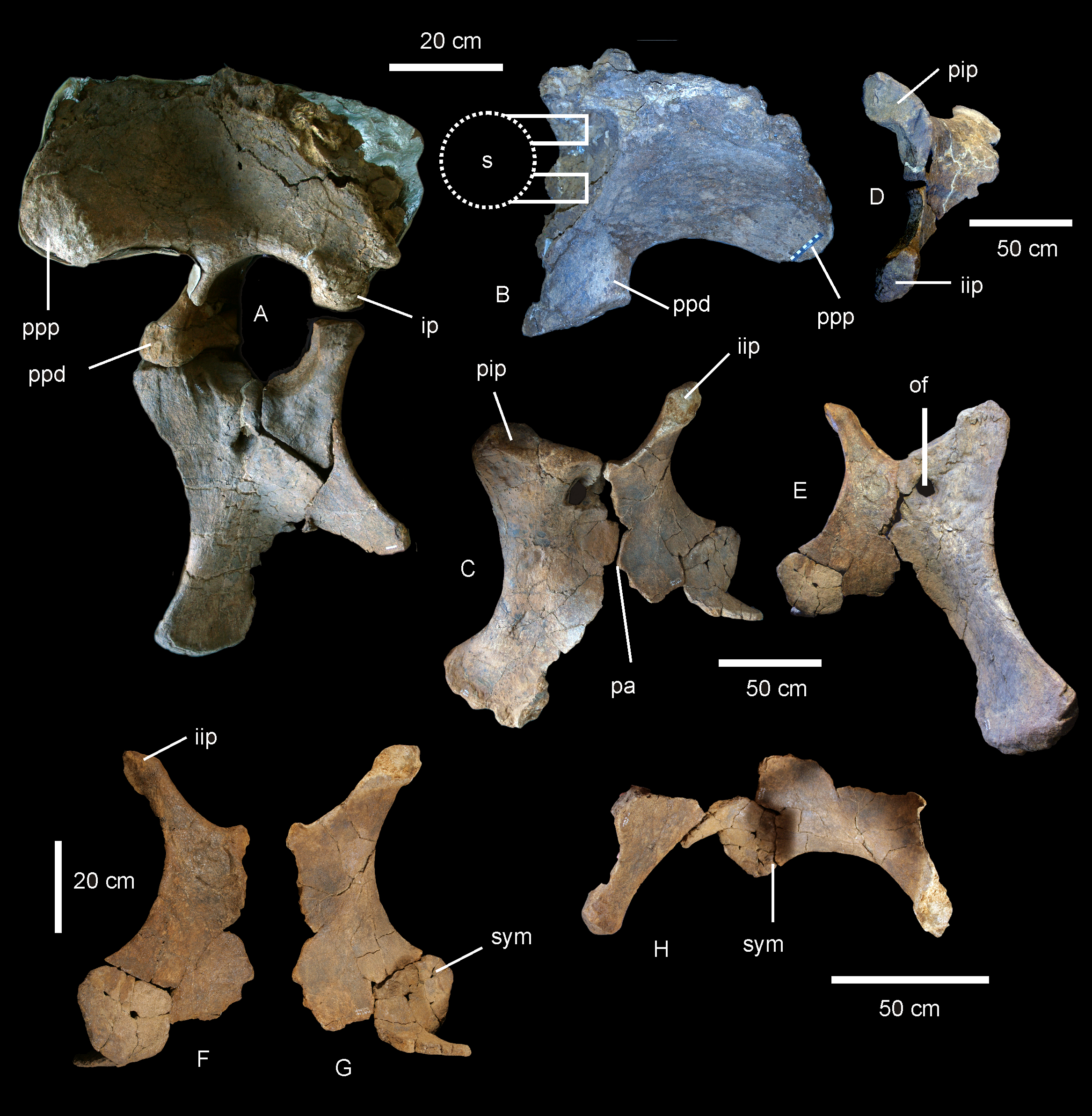
Pelvic bones as articulated and individually in multiple views

The left ilium, left and right pubes, left and right ischia, and entire right leg lacking the foot are preserved for Diamantinasaurus, although some bones are highly fragmented and poorly preserved. The ilium has the outside well preserved, but its size and fragility mean the internal side cannot be seen for anatomical features. The top edge of the ilium is broken, revealing numerous small internal camerae, as present in the titanosaurs Alamosaurus, Epachthosaurus, Lirainosaurus, Saltasaurus and Sonidosaurus. Shared with other derived titanosaurs, the anterior process of the ilium flares to the side and rotates so the vertical ilium body becomes a horizontal shelf. Diamantinasaurus also displays the derived sauropod traits of a rounded ilium, reduced articular surface for the ischium, and a protuberance above the ischiatic articulation (only shared with Opisthocoelicaudia among Titanosauriformes). The pubis, as in advanced sauropods, is a flattened bone, lacking the anterior hook of diplodocoids, but with potentially autapomorphic grooves surrounding the obturator foramen. Articulation with the ischium takes up 46% of the pubic length, as in most macronarians but contrasting with Alamosaurus and Opisthocoelicaudia, where it is reduced. The entire ischium is only 68% of the length of the pubis as in other titanosaurs, and also expands medially so the entire floor of the pelvis is closed. Unlike some titanosaurs, the ischium of Diamantinasaurus displays no constriction of its width, nor a flange projecting internally. Diamantinasaurus also lacks a notable muscle scar for the M. flexor tibialis internus 3 on the side of the distal ischium, which is diagnostic for the taxon amongst Neosauropoda.

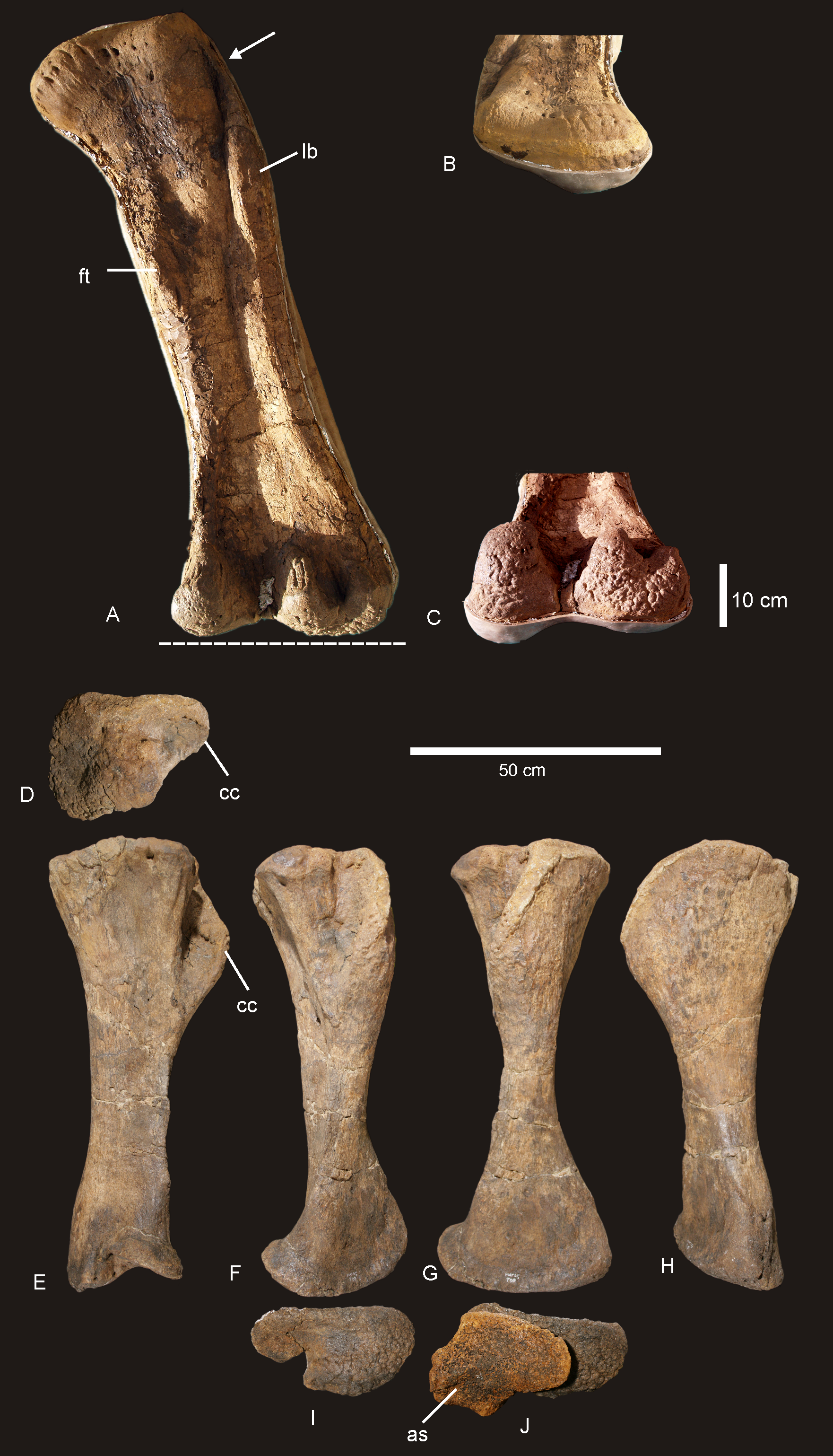
Femur displaying bevelled morphology (above) and tibia (below) of Diamantinasaurus

The femur, 1.345 m (4.41 ft) long, is roughly twice as wide as it is long, as in other derived sauropods, although it has been slightly crushed. The crushing did not prevent the preservation of the linea intermuscularis cranialis ridge, also present in Saltasaurus, Neuquensaurus, Bonatitan, Rocasaurus and Alamosaurus. As is typical for a sauropod, the head of the femur is slightly above the greater trochanter, and there is a mild trochanteric shelf. A moderate lateral bulge is present, above which the femur is shifted medially, like most macronarians except Opisthocoelicaudia, Saltasaurus and Rapetosaurus. The condyles for articulation with the tibia and fibula extend high onto the posterior surface of the femur, but unlike Neuquensaurus and Opisthocoelicaudia do not extend onto the anterior surface. A depression subdivides the fibular condyle, which bears a slight ridge also found in Magyarosaurus and other titanosaurs, although the prominence of it is unique to Diamantinasaurus. The fibular condyle is larger than the tibial, and extends farther down, giving the femur a bevelled appearance, potentially diagnostic of Saltasauridae but also found in Rapetosaurus and the non-titanosaur Dongbeititan.

The tibia is 59% of the length of the femur, and as is normal for neosauropods is wider than it is long on the proximal surface. Diamantinasaurus bears multiple fossae and ridges on the tibia that have not been observed in other sauropods, making them a suite of diagnostic traits. As in many titanosaurs, the distal end of the tibia is flared to over double the midshaft width, although a thin flange along the midshaft may be diagnostic to Diamantinasaurus. Originally reconstructed missing part of the shaft, the fibula is 76.9 cm (30.3 in) long, and is intermediately robust, although close to gracile. The bone is poorly preserved, but still displays a diagnostic widening of the fibular muscle scar, and a diagnostic medial ridge with surrounding grooves. As in many titanosauriforms, the astragalus of Diamantinasaurus is less than 1.5 times as wide as long, and the proximal surface is divided into the ascending process and the fossa for the tibia. There is also a shallow fossa for the fibula on the outside face of the astragalus, giving the bone a subtriangular shape. No depressions or foramina are present at the anterior base of the ascending process, a condition typical of Eusauropoda. A process on the posterior side of the astragalar body is unique among all sauropods, making it an autapomorphy of Diamantinasaurus.

== Classification ==
When it was originally described, Diamantinasaurus was assigned to Lithostrotia incertae sedis. In both phylogenies it was placed in, Diamantinasaurus was either just outside Saltasauridae or the sister taxon of Opisthocoelicaudia within the family. In a 2014 study, it was found that the genus was placed as a lithostrotian in both large phylogenies, in a relatively derived position in Titanosauria. Their first phylogeny was modified from that of Carbadillo and Sander (2014), the matrix being indirectly based on Wilson's 2002 phylogeny. In that cladogram, Diamantinasaurus was found to be sister taxon to Tapuiasaurus, their relationship outside of Saltasauridae. In this phylogeny, the Bremer support for each group was at most 1. Five features of the skeleton supported the placement of Diamantinasaurus in Lithostrotia.

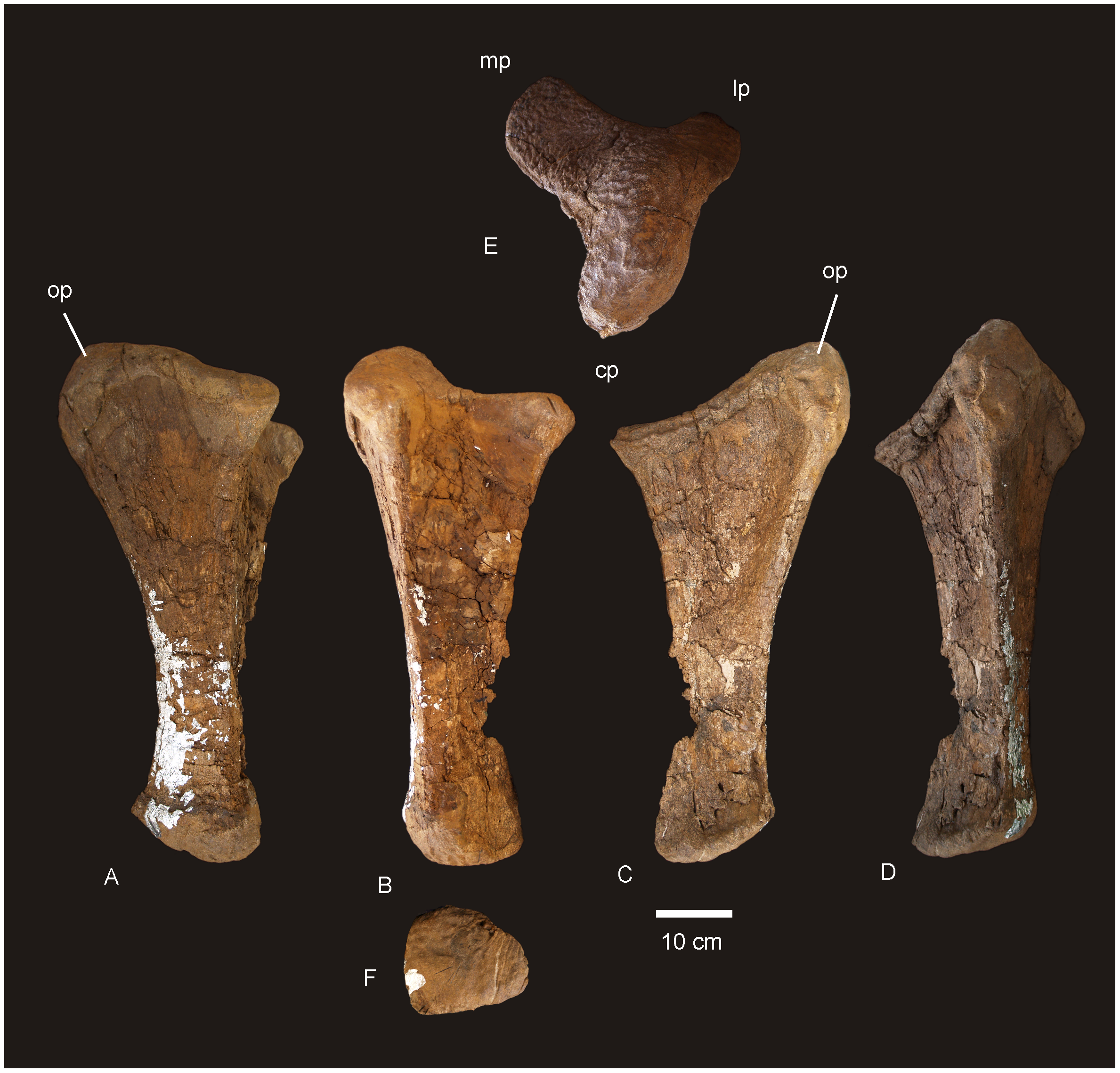
Holotype ulna in multiple views

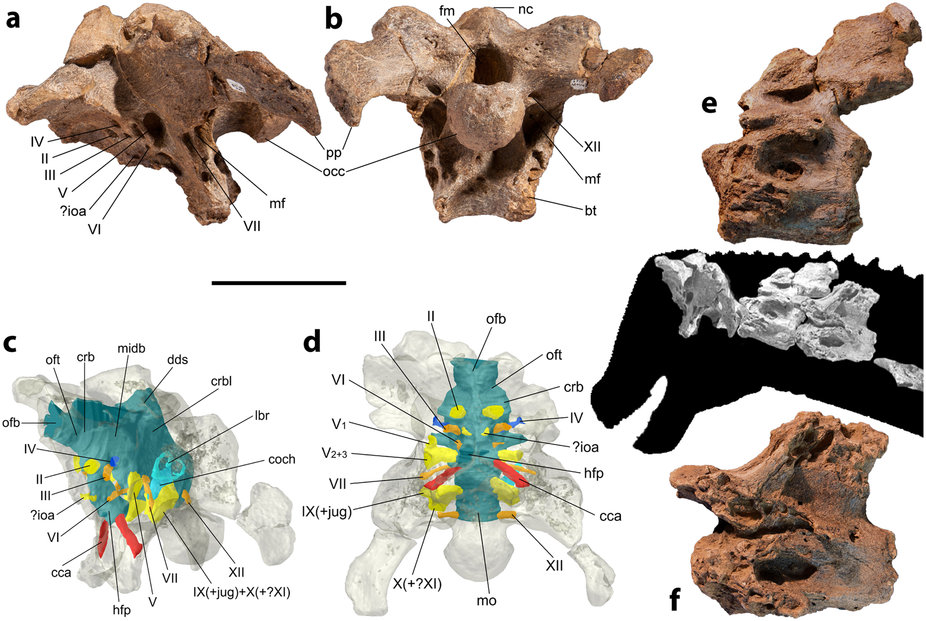
Referred neck vertebrae and skull of AODF 836

- Somphospondyli
  - Chubutisaurus
  - - - Wintonotitan
      - Tendaguria
    - - Ligabuesaurus
      - - Phuwiangosaurus
        - Titanosauria
          - Andesaurus
          - - Argentinosaurus
            - - Epachthosaurus
              - Lithostrotia
                - Malawisaurus
                - - Nemegtosaurus
                  - - - Diamantinasaurus
                      - Tapuiasaurus
                    - - Alamosaurus
                      - Saltasauridae
                        - Opisthocoelicaudia
                        - - - Isisaurus
                            - Rapetosaurus
                          - - Trigonosaurus
                            - - Saltasaurus
                              - Neuquensaurus

In the same study, the relationships using the Mannion et al. (2013) matrix were tested. These resolved with Diamantinasaurus as a saltasaurid, sister to Opisthocoelicaudia, with Dongyangosaurus as the next closest. Two characters were found to support the placement of Diamantinasaurus in Lithostrotia, and a third could not be evaluated.

Another phylogenetic analysis in 2016, partially reproduced below, found it as a non-lithostrotian titanosaur and the sister taxon of the contemporary Savannasaurus.

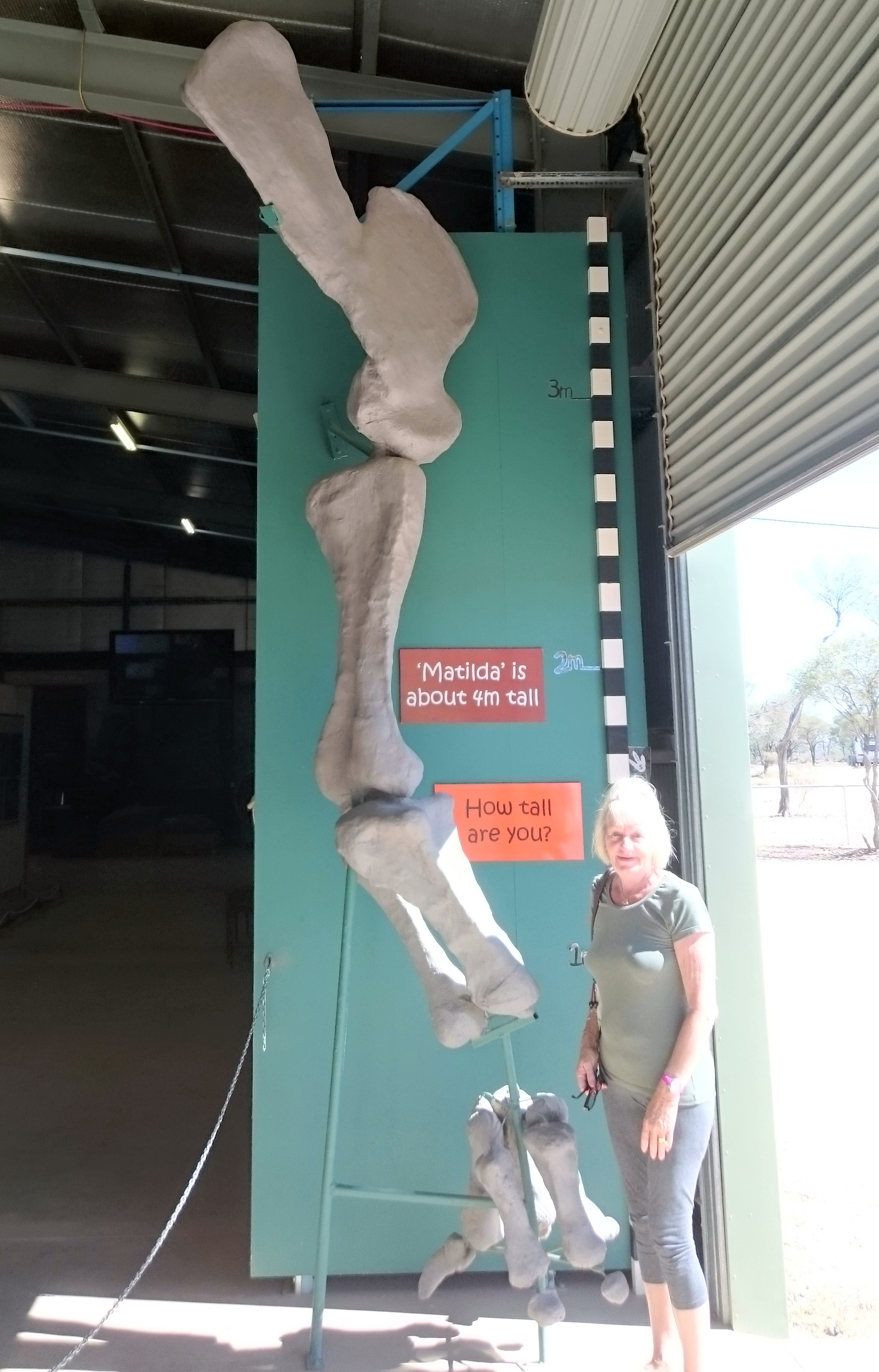
Reconstructed forelimb

- Titanosauria
  - Andesaurus
  - - - Dongyangosaurus
      - Baotianmansaurus
    - - Ligabuesaurus
      - - - Savannasaurus
          - Diamantinasaurus
        - - - Xianshanosaurus
            - Daxiatitan
          - Lithostrotia
            - Malawisaurus
            - - - Muyelensaurus
                - - Futalognkosaurus
                  - Epachthosaurus
              - - Nemegtosauridae
                  - Tapuiasaurus
                  - Nemegtosaurus
                - - Isisaurus
                  - Saltasauridae
                    - Saltasaurus
                    - - Opisthocoelicaudia
                      - - Jiangshanosaurus
                        - Alamosaurus

Gorscak & O'Connor (2019) in their description of Mnyamawamtuka recovered Diamantinasaurus as a saltasaurid using a parsimony phylogenetic analysis, while a variable-rates Bayesian phylogenetic analysis recovered it as falling just outside Saltasauridae.

- Titanosauria
  - - Karongasaurus
    - - - Argentinosaurus
        - - Andesaurus
          - Ligabuesaurus
      - - Jiangshanosaurus
        - - - Angolatitan
            - Malarguesaurus
          - - Chubutisaurus
            - Wintonotitan
  - - Tastavinsaurus
    - Lithostrotia
      - - Malawisaurus
        - Mnyamawamtuka
      - - Tapuiasaurus
        - - Normanniasaurus
          - - - - Rinconsaurus
                - - Isisaurus
                  - Rapetosaurus
              - - Muyelensaurus
                - - Bonitasaura
                  - - Gondwanatitan
                    - - - Panamericansaurus
                        - - Overosaurus
                          - Shingopana
                      - - Trigonosaurus
                        - - Aeolosaurus
                          - Argyrosaurus
            - - Diamantinasaurus
              - - Patagotitan
                - Saltasauridae
                  - - Paralititan
                    - - Maxakalisaurus
                      - - Neuquensaurus
                        - Saltasaurus
                  - - - Epachthosaurus
                      - - Futalognkosaurus
                        - - Mendozasaurus
                          - - Atsinganosaurus
                            - Notocolossus
                    - - Rukwatitan
                      - - - Lohuecotitan
                          - Nemegtosaurus
                        - - - Lirainosaurus
                            - Opisthocoelicaudia
                          - - - Ampelosaurus
                              - - Mansourasaurus
                                - Paludititan
                            - - Pellegrinisaurus
                              - - Dreadnoughtus
                                - - Alamosaurus
                                  - Baurutitan

The 2021 study recovered a similar topology, finding a close relationship with Savannasaurus as well as Sarmientosaurus from the early Late Cretaceous of Patagonia, which skull had similarities to the referred cranial material of Diamantinasaurus. The clade containing these taxa was dubbed Diamantinasauria. Beeston et al. (2024) considered Australotitan as a junior synonym of Diamantinasaurus or an indeterminate species of diamantinasaurian titanosaur, since the holotype of Australotitan possesses no distinguishable autapomorphic features to classify it as a valid genus and shares many similarities with known specimens of Diamantinasaurus.

== Paleobiology ==
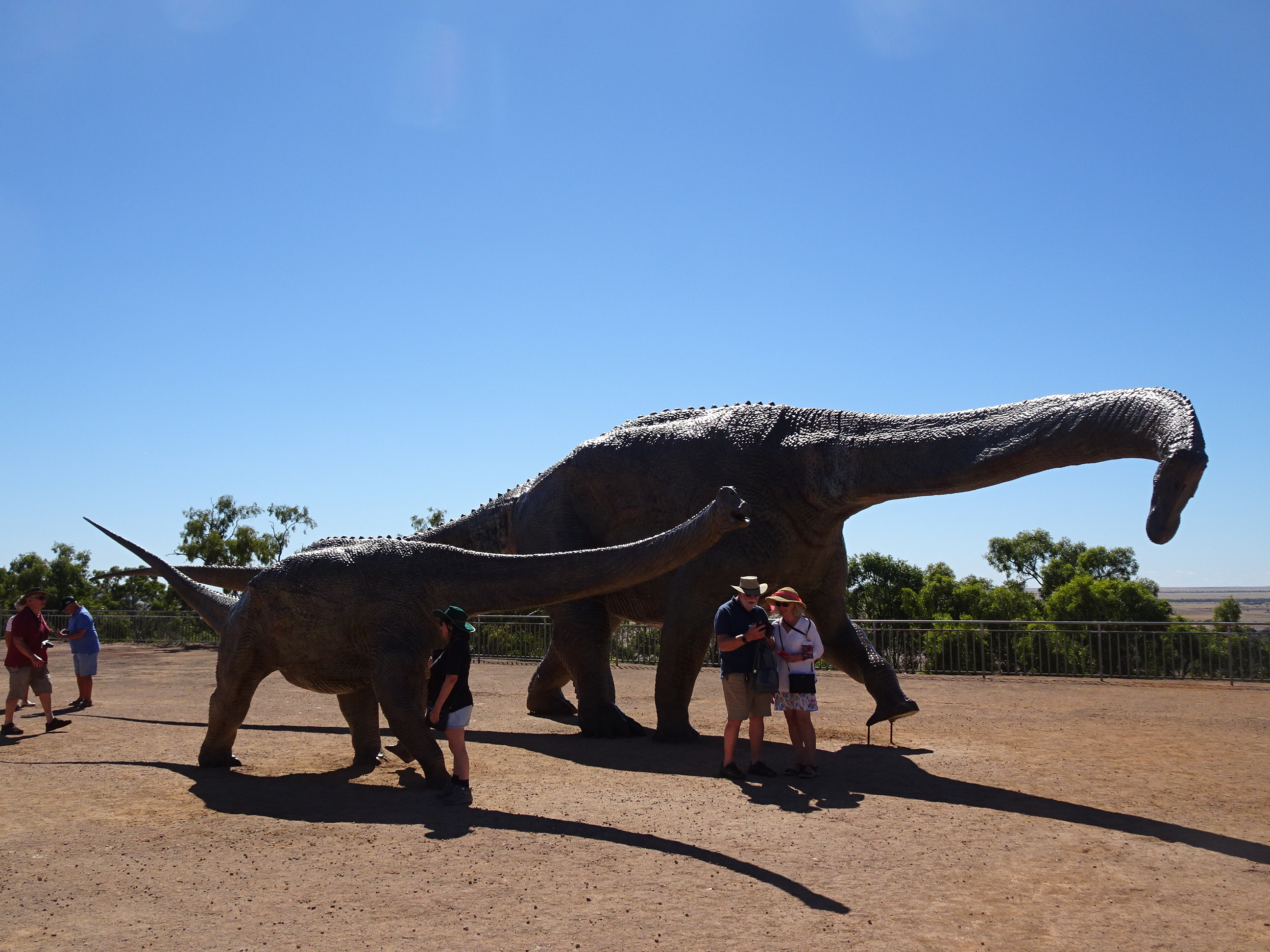
Models of an adult and juvenile at Australian Age of Dinosaurs

=== Growth ===
In 2011, the smallest positively identified titanosaur embryo was described. Although it was uncovered in Mongolia, the embryo shares the most features with Diamantinasaurus and Rapetosaurus. The embryo, from a relatively spherical 87.07–91.1 millimetres (3.428–3.587 in) egg, was identified as persisting to a lithostrotian. The embryo was slightly robust, intermediate between the robustness of Rapetosaurus and Diamantinasaurus. The egg is part of an entire nesting site for lithostrotian titanosaurs. Dating of the region also suggests that this egg predates those of Auca Mahuevo in Argentina, and that the eggs were laid in the Early Cretaceous.

=== Feeding ===
In 2025, the fossilized gut contents from a referred subadult specimen AODF 0888 was described in detail. Prior to this discovery, the gut contents of sauropods have never been reported, so the exact diet of sauropods had to be largely speculated. The specimen provided direct dietary evidence of bulk feeding and multi-level browsing, resulting in consumption of conifers, seed ferns and flowering plants. The relative completeness of the plant material also indicated that sauropods used their mouths minimally to process their food and relied on "fermentation and their gut microflora for digestion". The association of three shed megaraptorid theropod teeth suggested that the carcass might have been partially scavenged before burial.

== Paleoecology ==
Diamantinasaurus was found about 60 kilometres (37 mi) northwest of Winton, near Elderslie Station. It was recovered from the fossil-rich section of the Winton Formation, which can be dated to approximately 93 million years ago. Diamantinasaurus was found in a clay layer between sandstone layers, interpreted as an oxbow lake deposit. Also found at the site was Australovenator, which was directly associated with Diamantinasaurus, bivalves, fish, turtles, crocodilians, and various plants. The Winton Formation had a faunal assemblage including bivalves, gastropods, insects, the lungfish Metaceratodus, turtles, the crocodilian Isisfordia, pterosaurs, and several types of dinosaurs, such as the aforementioned Australovenator, the sauropods Wintonotitan, Savannasaurus, and Austrosaurus, and unnamed ankylosaurians and hypsilophodonts. Diamantinasaurus bones can be distinguished from other sauropods because of the overall robusticity as well as multiple specific features. Plants known from the formation include ferns, ginkgoes, gymnosperms, and angiosperms.
