= Shingopana =

Shingopana Temporal range: late Campanian-early Maastrichtian ~74.3–71.4 Ma

Scientific classification
- Kingdom: Animalia
- Phylum: Chordata
- Class: Reptilia
- Clade: Dinosauria
- Clade: Saurischia
- Clade: †Sauropodomorpha
- Clade: †Sauropoda
- Clade: †Macronaria
- Clade: †Titanosauria
- Clade: †Lithostrotia
- Clade: †Aeolosaurini
- Genus: †Shingopana; Gorscak et al. 2017

Type species
- †Shingopana songwensis Gorscak et al. 2017

Extinct genus of reptiles

Shingopana (meaning "wide neck" in Swahili) is a genus of titanosaurian sauropod from the Upper Cretaceous (late Campanian-early Maastrichtian age) Galula Formation of Tanzania. It is known from only the type species, S. songwensis. Gorscak & O'Connor's phylogenetic testing suggest Shingopana is more closely related to the South American titanosaur family of Aeolosaurini than any of the titanosaurs found so far in North & South Africa.

== Discovery and naming ==
Part of the holotype, TZ-07, was discovered in 2002 by scientists affiliated with the Rukwa Rift Basin Project, which was run by Patrick O'Connor and Nancy Stevens. The rest of the skeleton was excavated during the following years. The species Shingopana songwensis was officially named in 2017.

== Description ==
Shingopana was a quadrupedal Aeolosaurin sauropod that would have reached up to 8 metres (26 ft) long when fully grown, smaller than the average sauropod.

=== Skeleton ===
The holotype was damaged by insect bore holes shortly after the animal died.

Shingopana is known from a partial jaw, represented by the angular bone. Shingopana is also known from four cervical vertebrae; with two of these vertebrae having preserved cervical ribs and another isolated cervical rib. Shingopana instead had remnants of a bulbous expansion on the incompletely preserved cervical vertebrae, which probably helped to strengthen its neck.

Four ribs have been preserved with the holotype, but none are complete. The ribs had flanged edges, but their function is currently unknown.

An almost complete humerus and a partial pubis were also present in the holotype.

== Palaeoecology ==
The holotype was discovered in the Upper Cretaceous Galula Formation of the Rukwa Rift Basin in Tanzania. It would have coexisted with the sauropods Rukwatitan and Mnyamawamtuka, the mesoeucrocodiles Pakasuchus and Rukwasuchus, the mammal Galulatherium, an unnamed notosuchian, an unnamed turtle, an unnamed theropod and two types of lungfish (Lupaceradotus and an unnamed genus).

== See also ==
- 2017 in archosaur paleontology
