= AAOD =

AAOD may refer to:

- Ancient Archaeological Order of Druids; see Druidry (modern)#Druidry in North America
- Australian Age of Dinosaurs, a not for profit organisation
