= Evelyne Isaack Mbede =

Tanzanian geologist (born 1957)

- Born: 24 April 1957 (age 69); Njombe, Tanzania
- Occupation: Geologist

Academic background
- Education: University of Dar es Salaam; Imperial College London (MSc); Technical University Berlin (PhD)

Evelyne Isaack Mbede (born 24 April 1957) is a Tanzanian geologist working in volcanology and seismology. She obtained her PhD in 1993 after researching the tectonics of the Rukwa Rift Basin. She is the first woman in Tanzania to hold a PhD in Earth sciences. She was director of science and technology in the Ministry of Communication, Science and Technology from 2007 to 2017.

== Early life and education ==
Evelyne Isaack Mbede was born on 24 April 1957 in Njombe, Tanzania. Her father, Mwalimu Esau Isikaka Alatanga Mbede, was a local primary school teacher. She grew up in Makambako during the Apollo era, and her father tuned into BBC radio broadcasts of the missions. She initially aspired to become an astronaut, but upon entering the University of Dar es Salaam (UDSM) she pursued geology due to the school's lack of a space-related programme. She graduated with a Bachelor of Science in geology in 1982. She obtained a Master of Science in petroleum geology at the Imperial College London in 1984. She carried out her PhD at Technical University Berlin, researching the tectonic evolution of the Rukwa Rift Basin. Early in her PhD, she joined the Organization for Women in Science for the Developing World. She completed her PhD in 1993, becoming the first woman in Tanzania to hold a PhD in Earth sciences.

== Career ==
Mbede was appointed head of UDSM's geology department in 2004 until 2006, when she was appointed as the Dean of the Faculty of Science (now the College of Natural and Applied Sciences; CoNAS) until 2007. In 2007, she became director of science and technology in the Ministry of Communication, Science and Technology, overseeing a period of great growth in government funding for science and technology. She held the position until 2017, advocating for equal opportunities for women and academics' involvement in Tanzanian science policy. She was elected as a fellow to The World Academy of Sciences (TWAS) in 2013. She is an associate professor in Earth sciences at UDSM.

Her early research focused on volcanology and seismology. She provided advice to rural communities in seismically active areas near Mount Rungwe and Ol Doinyo Lengai. Her involvement in research paused during her tenure at the Ministry of Communication, Science and Technology. By 2020, she shifted her focus to searching for underground helium reservoirs in the Rukwa Rift Basin.

=== Awards ===
Mbede has won the University Prize and the University Trust Fund Prize. In 2019, she received the 2019 TWAS-C.N.R. Rao Award for her volcanic and seismic research in the East African Rift. In 2026, she was crowned Phenomenal Woman of the Year at the Pre-International Women’s Day (PreIWD) Awards for her work in science and policy.

== Publications ==
Mbede has published over 50 peer-reviewed scientific papers in the topics of geology, petroleum systems, tectonics, and natural hazards assessment. Some of them include:

- with Foster, A.; Ebinger, C.; et al. (July 1997). "Tectonic development of the northern Tanzanian sector of the East African Rift System". Journal of the Geological Society. 154 (4): 689–700.
- with Ebinger, C.; Djomani, Y. Poudjom; et al. (November 1997). "Rifting Archaean lithosphere: the Eyasi-Manyara-Natron rifts, East Africa". Journal of the Geological Society. 154 (6): 947–960.
- Mbede, E.; Van der Beek, P.; Andriessen, P.; Delvaux, D. (April 1998). "Denudation history of the Malawi and Rukwa Rift flanks (East African Rift System) from apatite fission track thermochronology". Journal of African Earth Sciences. 26 (3): 363–385.
- with Fontijn, K.; Williamson, D.; et al. (February 2012). "The Rungwe Volcanic Province, Tanzania – A volcanological review". Journal of African Earth Sciences. 63: 12–31.
