= David Elliott (palaeontologist) =

Australian paleontologist and farmer

David Elliott OAM
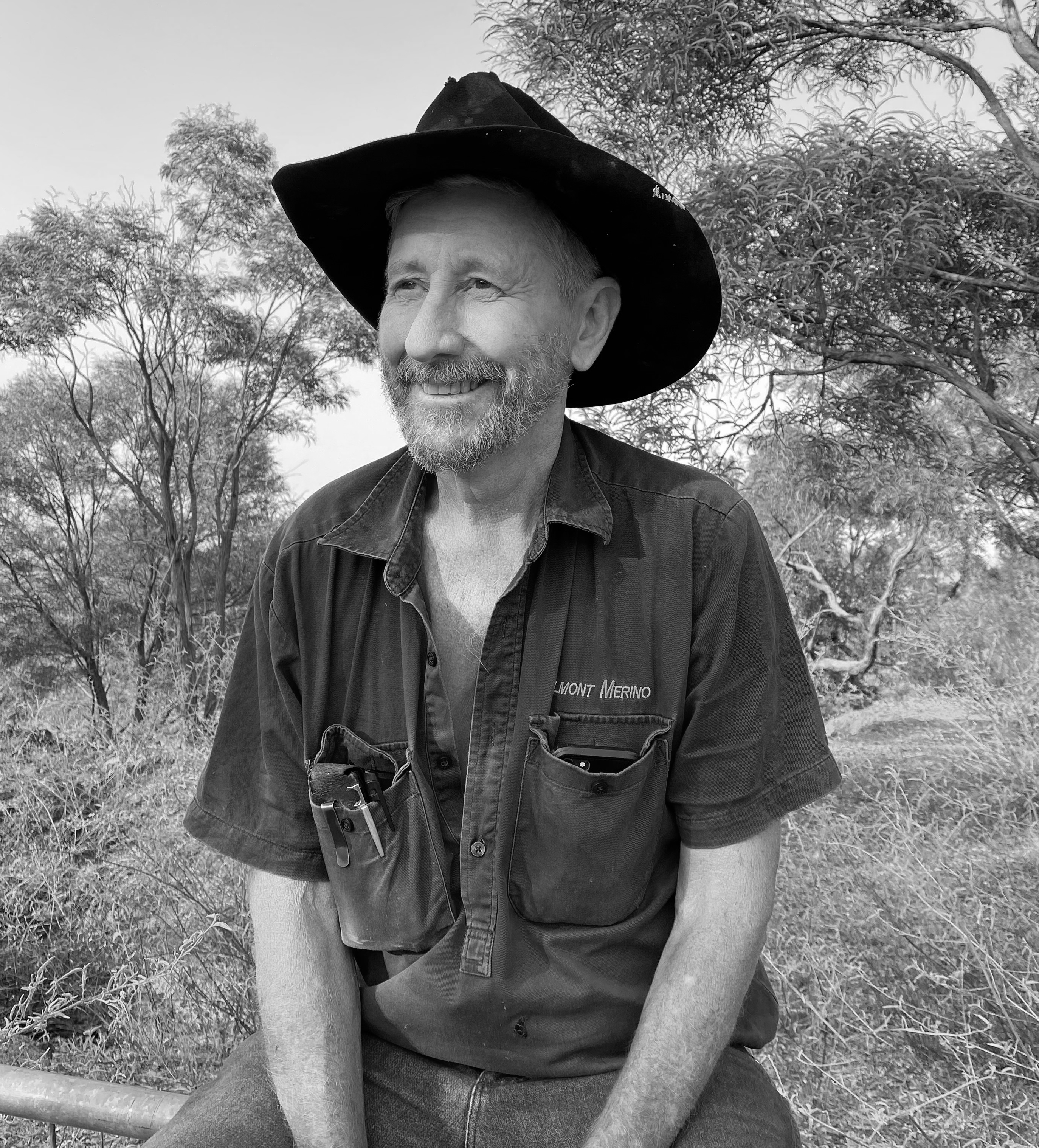
- Elliott in 2023
- Born: 6 June 1957 (age 69); Brisbane, Queensland, Australia.
- Known for: Dinosaurs, palaeotourism
- Spouse: Judy Elliott
- Scientific career
- Fields: paleontology, farming
- Workplaces: Australian Age of Dinosaurs
- Website: www.australianageofdinosaurs.com

David Anthon Elliott OAM (born 6 June 1957) is an Australian palaeontologist and sheep and cattle grazier who co-founded the Australian Age of Dinosaurs in Winton, Queensland, with his wife Judy and currently serves as Executive Chairman. His significant contributions to the local, national and global communities have been far-reaching, with a profound impact on the field of palaeontology. Through the establishment and development of the Australian Age of Dinosaurs Museum of Natural History, he has pioneered a new form of tourism known as palaeotourism, attracting new visitors to regional Australia.

== Biography ==
Elliott grew up in Winton, Queensland as the second child of Robert and Noreen Elliott. He was a student at All Souls St Gabriels School in Charters Towers before graduating from Longreach Pastoral College in 1974. Elliott married his wife Judy in 1986, and the two went on to raise their four children on their large property, Belmont Station, making a living as sheep and cattle graziers.

In 1999, at the age of 42, Elliott discovered the fossilised bone of Australia's largest dinosaur while mustering sheep at Belmont. This significant find, along with subsequent discoveries made with the Queensland Museum, led Elliott and his wife to hold a public meeting on 17 August 2002, to discuss building a dinosaur museum in Winton.

In October 2002, Australian Age of Dinosaurs Incorporated was established as a not-for-profit organisation. For the first seven years, the Museum operated on the Elliotts' property, where they conducted annual dinosaur digs and amassed an incredible collection of Australian dinosaur bones. This operation was eventually relocated in 2009 to donated land on The Jump-Up, a vast mesa near Winton. The Museum's growth has been impressive, with various stages of construction leading to the completion of crucial infrastructure.

== Contributions to palaeontology ==
Over the last two decades, Elliott has been involved in the discovery of several new species of Australian prehistoric animals and has collected the largest collection of Australian dinosaur fossils in the world housed at the Australian Age of Dinosaurs Museum. Given his role in their discovery and preparation Elliott is listed on the scientific papers of several new species including Australovenator, Diamantinasaurus, Savannasaurus, Wintonotitan, Ferrodraco and Confractosuchus as well as the 54 metre long Snake Creek tracksite. His contributions to palaeontology include developing a thriving palaeotourism industry in regional Australia, which now accounts for a quarter of Queensland's leisure tourism.

== Australian Age of Dinosaurs ==
The Australian Age of Dinosaurs Museum of Natural History was founded by David and Judy Elliott, who continue to expand its operations to attract more visitors to regional Australia. The Museum is located 24 kilometres southeast of Winton, and about 660 kilometres (410 mi) southwest of Townsville, on Australia's first International Dark-Sky Sanctuary. It has been built in stages and has won several awards. The Museum features Australia's most productive Fossil Preparation Laboratory, the Reception Centre and Collection Room, Dinosaur Canyon (featuring life-sized bronze dinosaur dioramas), the March of the Titanosaurs exhibition and the Gondwana Stars Observatory.

== Awards and recognition ==
- 2006: Queensland Museum Medal from the Queensland Museum
- 2011: The James Love Churchill Fellowship from the Winston Churchill Trust
- 2014: Winton Citizen of the Year from the Winton Shire Council
- 2015: Order of Australia Medal (OAM) from The Governor-General of the Commonwealth of Australia
- 2019: Marie Watson-Blake Award for Outstanding Contribution by an Individual from the Queensland Tourism Industry Council
- 2023: Queensland's Local Hero from the Australia Day Council
- 2024: Australia's Local Hero from the Australia Day Council
- 2025: Queensland Great at the Queensland Greats Awards from the Queensland Government
- 2026: National winner in the Social Impact category of the 2026 EY Entrepreneur of the Year Award
