= Nsungwe Formation =

Oligocene-aged geological formation in East African Rift System

- Stratigraphic range: Oligocene; ~25.2 Ma
- Type: Geological formation
- Unit of: Red Sandstone Group (Rukwa Rift Basin)
- Sub-units: Utengule Member, Songwe Member
- Underlies: Unconformity with Lake Beds Sequence
- Overlies: Unconformity with Galula Formation
- Thickness: 400 m (1,300 ft)

Lithology
- Primary: Sandstone
- Other: Conglomerate, mudstone, siltstone, tuff

Location
- Location: Rukwa, Mbeya Region
- Region: African Great Lakes
- Country: Tanzania

Type section
- Named for: Nsungwe River
- Named by: Roberts et al.
- Year defined: 2010
- Thickness at type section: ~400 m

The Nsungwe Formation is a formation in the Rukwa Rift Basin of the East African Rift System, it is Oligocene in age based on U-Pb dating of a tuff horizon within the formation. It is part of the Red Sandstone Group along with the uncomfortably underlying Mid-Cretaceous Galula Formation It is divided into two members, the lower Utengule Member, and the upper Songwe member. It is notable for being one of the most important Paleogene fossil deposits in Sub-Saharan Africa.

== Geology ==
The lithology of the two members are quite different, representing different fluvial environments. The Utengule member is 85 m thick and predominantly consists of red-orange sandstones and matrix to clast supported conglomerates. The overlying Songwe Member is approximately twice as thick as the Utengule member, being 310–320 m thick in the type section. It is much finer grained, consisting of red-orange and grey green claystones, siltstones, mudstones, lenticular sandstones and tuffs. The sediments of the Songwe Member are noted for their fossil content.

== Fossil content ==
Important fossils have come out of the formation, including the rodent Kahawamys, some of the oldest records of the frog genus Xenopus, the hyaenodont Pakakali, the elephant shrews Oligorhynchocyon and Rukwasengi, and the primates Nsungwepithecus and Rukwapithecus, some of the earliest crown catarrhines.
