= Kahawamys =

Kahawamys Temporal range: Late Oligocene

Scientific classification
- Domain: Eukaryota
- Kingdom: Animalia
- Phylum: Chordata
- Class: Mammalia
- Order: Rodentia
- Clade: Ctenohystrica
- Superfamily: Thryonomyoidea
- Family: incertae sedis
- Genus: †Kahawamys; Stevens et al., 2009
- Species: †K. mbeyaensis

Binomial name
- †Kahawamys mbeyaensis Stevens et al., 2009

Extinct genus of rodents

Kahawamys is an extinct genus of thryonomyoid rodent which existed in Nsungwe Formation, Tanzania during the late Oligocene. It was first named by Nancy J. Stevens, Patricia A. Holroyd, Eric M. Roberts, Patrick M. O'connor and Michael D. Gottfried in 2009 and the type species is Kahawamys mbeyaensis.
