= Galula Formation =

Geological formation in Tanzania

- Stratigraphic range: Aptian-Campanian; ~120–75 Ma
- Type: Geological formation
- Unit of: Red Sandstone Group
- Sub-units: Mtuka Member, Namba Member
- Underlies: Unconformity with Nsungwe Formation
- Overlies: Unconformity with Karoo Supergroup or basement
- Thickness: 600–3,000 m (2,000–9,800 ft)

Lithology
- Primary: Sandstone
- Other: Conglomerate, mudstone

Location
- Coordinates: 7.1°S 31.2°E
- Approximate paleocoordinates: 28.8°S 16.5°E
- Region: Rukwa Region, Songwe Region
- Country: Tanzania
- Extent: African Great Lakes, Rukwa Rift Basin

Type section
- Named for: Galula
- Named by: Roberts et al.
- Location: Galula Coalfields
- Year defined: 2010
- Coordinates: 8°40′55.6″S 32°53′33.5″E
- Thickness at type section: 520 m (1,710 ft)
- Galula Formation (Tanzania)

The Galula Formation is a geological formation located south of Lake Rukwa in Tanzania, part of the Red Sandstone Group of the Rukwa Rift Basin. Along with the unconformably overlying Oligocene Nsungwe Formation. It is divided into two members, the lower Mtuka Member and the upper Namba Member.

The age of the deposit is poorly constrained, with the Mtuka Member likely being Aptian to Cenomanian in age, while the Namba Member being Cenomanian to Campanian in age based on Geomagnetic reversals. It is correlated with the Dinosaur Beds of Malawi.

The formation is fossiliferous, with Dinosaurs and Crocodyliformes being known from the formation.

== Geology ==
=== Lithology ===
The Lithology of the formation is a sequence of red, pink, purple and occasionally white colored sandstones, conglomerates and mudstones. The Mtuka member is 160–180 m thick in the type section, and is typified by coarser sandstone, a higher frequency of conglomerates, higher proportions of extraformational clasts, thicker and a greater frequency of overbank siltstone and mudstone lenses and a higher proportion of paleosols. While the Namba member is between 340–360 m in the type section, and is less variable in facies, predominated by very fine-to medium-grained sandstones with less overbank mudstone and siltstone lenses.

== Vertebrate paleofauna ==
=== Fish ===
Fish of the Galula Formation
| Genus | Species | Locality | Stratigraphic position | Abundance | Notes | Images |
|---|---|---|---|---|---|---|
| Lupaceradotus | L. useviaensis | RRBP 2004-06-30 | | | Lungfish | |
| Ceratodontidae | Indeterminate | | Mtuka Member | | Lungfish | |

=== Crocodyliformes ===
Crocodyliformes of the Galula Formation
| Genus | Species | Locality | Stratigraphic position | Abundance | Notes | Images |
|---|---|---|---|---|---|---|
| Pakasuchus | P. kapilimai | RRBP 2007-04 | Namba Member | [Two] skulls and an articulated skeleton. | A notosuchian crocodyliform with mammal-like teeth. | |
| Rukwasuchus | R. yajabalijekundu | Namba 2 | Middle Namba member | A partial skull and isolated teeth. | A notosuchian crocodyliform, and the only known sub-Saharan peirosaurid from Africa. | |
| Notosuchia | Indeterminate | | Namba Member | | | |

=== Dinosaurs ===
Dinosaurs of the Galula Formation
| Genus | Species | Locality | Stratigraphic position | Abundance | Notes | Images |
|---|---|---|---|---|---|---|
| Mnyamawamtuka | M. moyowamkia | | Mtuka Member | An anterior cervical vertebral neural arch, cervical vertebral centra, partial dorsal vertebrae, sacral neural arch, partial sacral centra, sacral ribs, caudal vertebral neural arches, centra, chevrons, numerous dorsal rib fragments, scapula, sternal plate, humeri, partial ulna, metacarpal I, metacarpal III, partial ischium, partial pubis, partial femora, tibiae, fibula, metatarsal I, metatarsal II, metatarsal III, metatarsal IV, metatarsal V, pedal phalanges, ungual, and numerous unidentifiable fragments. | A basal lithostrotian titanosaur with heart-shaped caudal vertebrae. | |
| Rukwatitan | R. bisepultus | Locality RRBP 2007-02 (Namba 2) | Middle Namba member | Posterior cervical vertebrae, partial anterior dorsal vertebral neural arch, anterior caudal vertebrae, middle caudal vertebrae, chevrons, multiple partial dorsal ribs, distal scapula, partial coracoids, humerus, partial ulna, ilium, and proximal pubis. | A basal lithostrotian titanosaur. | |
| Shingopana | S. songwensis | TZ-07 | Namba Member | An angular, partial anterior cervical vertebra, partial middle-to-posterior cervical vertebrae, partial cervical ribs, partial dorsal ribs, humerus, pubis, and many incomplete and/or unidentifiable fragments pertaining to the axial skeleton. | A lithostrotian titanosaur. | |
| Theropoda | Indeterminate | | Mtuka and Namba Members | A pair of articulated proximal caudal vertebrae, and 11 teeth. | An indeterminate theropod. | |

=== Turtles ===
Turtles of the Galula Formation
| Genus | Species | Locality | Stratigraphic position | Abundance | Notes | Images |
|---|---|---|---|---|---|---|
| Testudines | Indeterminate | | Mtuka and Namba Members. | Plastron and carapace fragments. | | |

=== Mammals ===
Mammals of the Galula Formation
| Genus | Species | Locality | Stratigraphic position | Abundance | Notes | Images |
|---|---|---|---|---|---|---|
| Galulatherium | G. jenkinsi | TZ-07 | Namba Member | Left dentary | Probable Gondwanathere | |
