= Neutron tomography =

Neutron tomography is a form of computed tomography involving the production of three-dimensional images by the detection of the absorbance of neutrons produced by a neutron source. It creates a three-dimensional image of an object by combining multiple planar images with a known separation. It has a resolution of down to 25 μm. Whilst its resolution is lower than that of X-ray tomography, it can be useful for specimens containing low contrast between the matrix and object of interest; for instance, fossils with a high carbon content, such as plants or vertebrate remains.

Neutron tomography results in the short- to medium-term radioactivation of imaged samples, with the form and period of residual radioactivity dependent on the elemental and isotopic composition of the samples, with elements. Of notable concern are samples containing appreciable levels of certain elements such as cobalt. In practice, this neutron activation is low and short-lived such that the method is considered non-destructive, and of potential benefit, enabling the qualitative and quantitative analysis of major, minor, trace or rare elements via instrumental neutron activation analysis.

The increasing availability of neutron imaging instruments at research reactors and spallation sources via peer-reviewed user access programs has seen neutron tomography achieve increasing impact across diverse applications including earth sciences, palaeontology, cultural heritage, materials research and engineering. In 2022, it was reported in the journal Gondwana Research that an ornithopod dinosaur was serendipitously discovered by neutron tomography in the gut content of Confractosuchus, a Cretaceous crocodyliform from the Winton Formation of central Queensland, Australia. This is the first time that a dinosaur has been discovered using neutron tomography, and to this day, the partially digested dinosaur remains entirely embedded within the surrounding matrix. That same year, in the journal Science, researchers announced the discovery of a 380-million-year-old three-dimensionally preserved heart inside a fossilised fish. The two-chambered, S-shaped heart is 250-million-years older than the previous oldest vertebrate heart and revealed the early evolution of the heart structure found in vertebrates, including humans, today.

== See also ==
- Winkler, B. (2006). "Applications of Neutron Radiography and Neutron Tomography". Reviews in Mineralogy and Geochemistry. 63 (1): 459–471. Bibcode:2006RvMG...63..459W. doi:10.2138/rmg.2006.63.17.
- Schwarz, D.; Vontobel, P. L.; Eberhard, H.; Meyer, C. A.; Bongartz, G. (2005). "Neutron tomography of internal structures of vertebrate remains: a comparison with X-ray computed tomography" (PDF). Palaeontologia Electronica. 8 (30).
- Mays, C.; Cantrill, D. J.; Stilwell. J. D.; Bevitt. J. J. (2017). "Neutron tomography of Austrosequoia novae-zeelandiae comb. nov. (Late Cretaceous, Chatham Islands, New Zealand): implications for Sequoioideae phylogeny and biogeography". Journal of Systematic Palaeontology. 16 (7): 551–570. doi:10.1080/14772019.2017.1314898. S2CID 133375313.
