= Australian Age of Dinosaurs =

Australian Age of Dinosaurs Museum
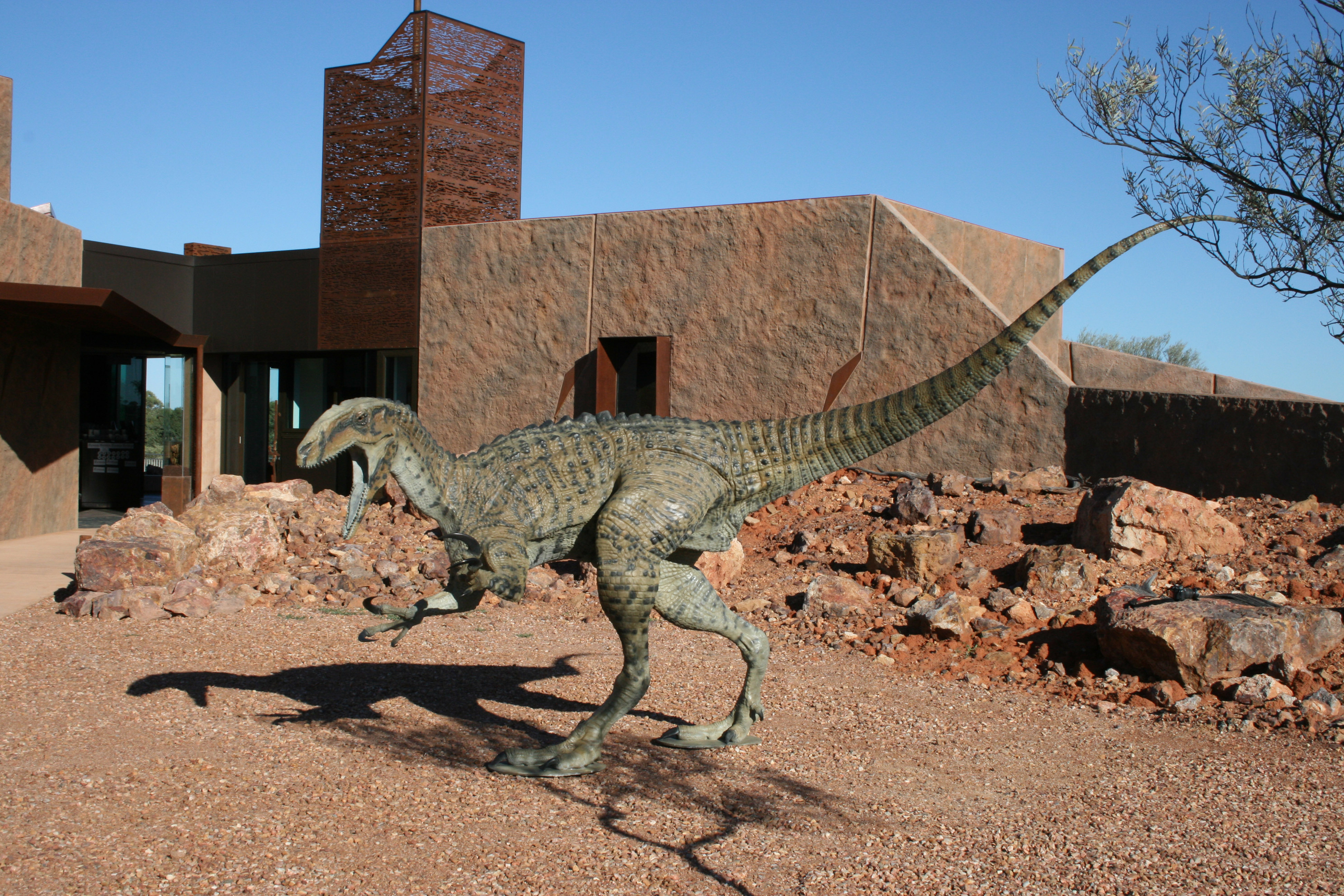
- AAOD Reception Centre with bronze Australovenator wintonensis (Banjo)

- Location in Queensland
- Established: 2002; 24 years ago
- Location: Lot 1, Dinosaur Drive, The Jump-Up Dark-Sky Sanctuary, Corfield, Queensland
- Coordinates: 22.4791°S 143.1827°E
- Type: Museum of Natural History
- Key holdings: Australovenator wintonensis, Diamantinasaurus matildae, Wintonotitan wattsi, Savannasaurus elliotorum, Ferrodraco lentoni, the Snake Creek tracksite, Confractosuchus sauroktonos
- Collections: Australian natural history
- Visitors: 59,148 (2021)
- Directors: David Elliott (executive chairman/founder), Ian Merritt (company secretary), Bruce Collins, Professor John Cole, Robert Elliott, Thomas Brodie, Carol Trewick
- Website: australianageofdinosaurs.com

Australian Age of Dinosaurs Ltd. (AAOD) is a nonprofit organization located in Winton, Queensland, founded by David Elliott and Judy Elliott in 2002. The organization’s activities include the operation of the Australian Age of Dinosaurs Museum of Natural History, which holds annual dinosaur digs in the Winton Formation of Western Queensland and oversees the year-round operation of Australia's most productive dinosaur fossil preparation laboratory. Since 2005, the AAOD Museum has accumulated the largest collection of Australian dinosaur fossils in the world and holds the holotype specimens of Diamantinasaurus matildae, Savannasaurus elliottorum, Australovenator wintonensis, Australia's most complete theropod skeleton, Ferrodraco lentoni, the first pterosaur to be named from the Winton Formation, and Confractosuchus sauroktonos. The museum is open to the public daily from April to October and is open six days a week (closed Sundays) from November to March. The site of the museum was designated a dark-sky preserve, the first International Dark-Sky Sanctuary in Australia, in 2019.

== Location ==
The AAOD Museum is located on top of a large mesa named 'The Jump-Up', which is 24 km south-east of Winton and 600 km south-west of Townsville. Visitors traveling from Longreach drive northwest along the Landsborough Highway for approximately 164 km before turning left onto Dinosaur Drive. From the highway, it is a further 11 km to the museum on a sealed road. Caravans can be towed to the top of the jump-up, although the museum has provided an unhitching area at the base of the mesa for visitors towing a caravan with a small 2WD vehicle.

== History ==
In 1999, David Elliott discovered the fossilized bone of what was, at the time, Australia's largest dinosaur while mustering sheep on his property in Belmont, near Winton. This bone was later identified as part of a giant femur from a Cretaceous sauropod that roamed the Winton area 95 million years ago. Following the discovery of more fossils during digs held in conjunction with the Queensland Museum, David Elliott and Judy Elliott called a public meeting in Winton on August 17, 2002, in view of establishing a dinosaur museum at Winton.

In October 2002, Australian Age of Dinosaurs Incorporated commenced operations as a not-for-profit organization aimed at ensuring future dinosaur digs and the preparation and conservation of dinosaur fossils from the Winton Formation could continue. The organization, with support from a strong member's volunteer base, began the initial stages of developing a major tourism attraction in the form of a dinosaur museum so that the discoveries could be preserved for perpetuity and be available to the public. While mustering sheep in March 2005, David Elliott discovered a new dinosaur site on Belmont, and a subsequent dig in September uncovered the remains of one of Australia's most complete sauropod skeletons. A total of 17 pallets of fossil bones trapped in a fine siltstone rock were recovered and stored in the Belmont shed. The dinosaur was nicknamed "Wade" in posthumous honor of Australian paleontologist Dr. Mary Wade, who died during the dig.

In late 2005, the discovery of a partial sauropod humerus on Elderslie Station, near Winton, led to a series of digs held by the AAOD Museum and the recovery of two dinosaur skeletons preserved together, one being a sauropod skeleton and the other a theropod. The sauropod was nicknamed "Matilda," and the theropod was nicknamed "Banjo," both in honor of Andrew Barton "Banjo" Paterson and his classic poem "Waltzing Matilda."

In mid-2006, David and Judy Elliott opened an "Australian Age of Dinosaurs" temporary fossil preparation facility in their shed at Belmont, which was known locally as the "Prep Shed." It was here that fossil preparation was carried out by a small group of staff preparators and volunteers who were accommodated in the station's Jackeroo and Shearers Quarters. Work commenced on Wade and expanded to include the bones of "Banjo" and "Matilda" as each dig produced further fossils. This work continued for almost three years and incorporated the help of over 100 volunteers. It was during this time that the 'Free Wade' project began, supported by an Australian Geographic fundraiser and private donations from numerous volunteers, members, and supporters.

In September 2006, Peter Britton and Carol Britton, owners of Mt. Landsborough Station near Winton, donated 1,400 hectares of mesa, or "Jump-Up" country, to AAOD as a site for the future museum. Over the following three years, funding was raised from Desert Channels Queensland to enable the new site to be fenced. The Winton Shire Council built a new gravel road to the top of the Jump-Up, and the Queensland Government contributed $500,000 toward a fossil preparation facility, staff cottages, and water and power amenities. The prep shed at Belmont was closed, and all fossils and equipment were relocated to the jump-up in early 2009. The new facilities were opened to the public in July 2009 by Queensland Premier Anna Bligh as part of Queensland's 150th year (Q 150) celebrations.

AAOD Inc. was restructured in June 2008 to become a not-for-profit company limited by guarantee with a board of up to nine directors. The new company, Australian Age of Dinosaurs Ltd. (AAODL), created a Society of Members (Australian Age of Dinosaurs Society) to carry on the support-based work of AAOD Inc. with levels of membership including ordinary members and life members, known as "Million Year Members." The museum's patron is Dame Quentin Bryce.

On 25 January 2024 David Elliott was named Australia’s Local Hero by the Prime Minister, The Hon Anthony Albanese MP, for reviving palaeotourism in Australia.

== Buildings ==
The construction of the AAOD Museum is divided into three stages, with each stage occupying a different area of the Jump-Up. Construction of Stage 1, which includes a temporary fossil preparation building, two staff cottages, and volunteer accommodation facilities, is now complete, as is Stage 2, which consists of the reception center for the AAOD Museum and a public car park. Stage 3, which is the future site of the AAOD Museum of Natural History, has completed its concept planning phase, and the initial construction of outdoor galleries has commenced. The AAOD Museum of Natural History has not yet been funded for construction.

=== Fossil preparation laboratory ===
The laboratory is located approximately 500m from the reception center and performs all the preparation, preservation, and restoration work necessary to enable the dinosaur fossils to be scientifically studied and put on exhibition. This building is divided into unprepared fossil storage, prepared fossil storage, and a large preparation area where staff and volunteers work on removing rock from the bones and consolidating them. A staff room, office, visitor waiting room, and equipment storage area are also housed within this facility.

As dinosaur fossils are usually preserved in solid-rock boulders or covered in thick bands of ironstone matrix, it is often a long and time-consuming task to chisel the rock away. Work undertaken at the Australian Age of Dinosaurs Laboratory includes mechanical preparation of the bones with pneumatic scribes, which remove rock from the bones. Other activities include restoration, repairs, consolidation of specimens, sieving, sorting of matrix for microfossils, and 'jig-saw puzzling' bone fragments together.

The laboratory encourages people to help with this preparation by becoming an honorary technician, which entails a 10-day fossil preparation course at the museum known as 'Prep-A-Dino'.

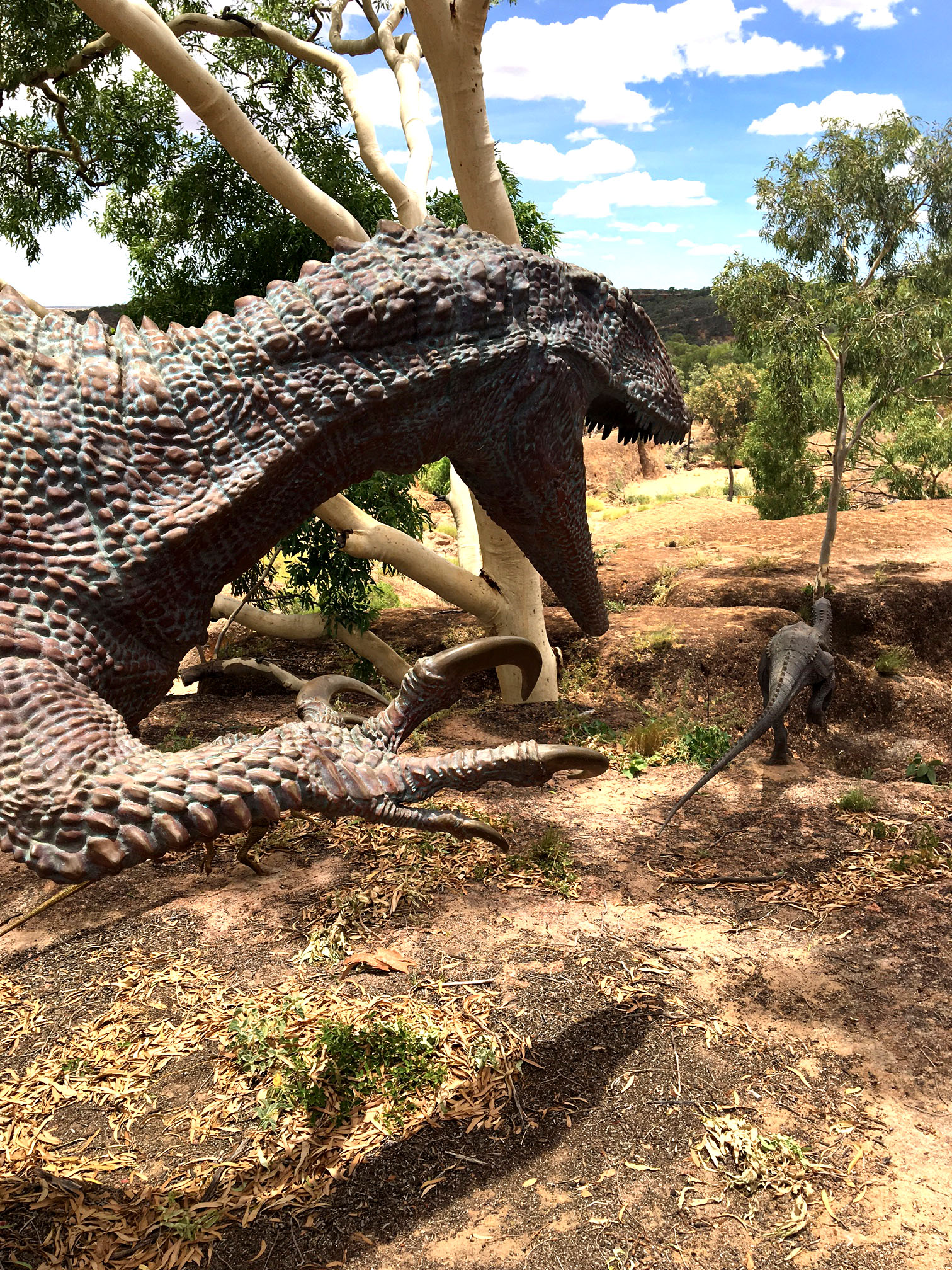
Dinosaur Stampede exhibit

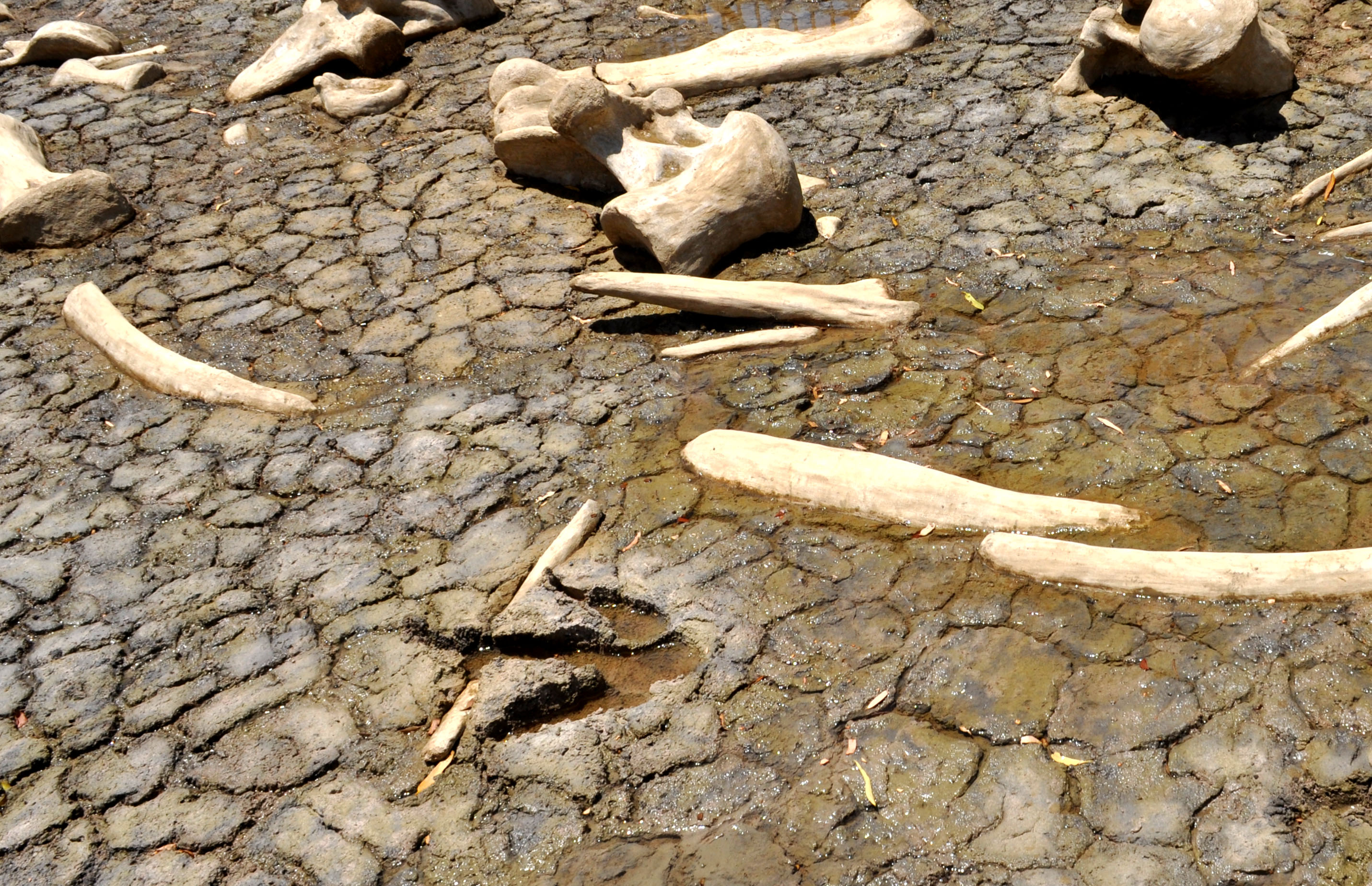
Death in the Billabong exhibit

=== Reception center ===
The reception center was built on $1 million in funding provided by the Australian government with $50,000 in funding from the Queensland government, and pro-bono support from the Winton Shire Council and several corporations. The building was designed by Cox Rayner Architects as a pro-bono contribution to the AAOD Project and built by Woollam Constructions in 2011. It was opened by the Federal Minister for Regional Australia, Simon Crean, on April 8, 2012. Designed to blend into the surrounding Jump-Up Rock, the building takes on the earthy hues and textures of the surrounding landscape. The concrete walls of the building were colored and stamped with latex mats that were molded from the rock surface of the Jump-Up Rock by the Elliott Family. A large contingent of volunteers contributed to the final aesthetic finishes of the building, including corten steel panels and landscaping.

The reception center contains a shop, café, and staff facilities, as well as a fossil holotype room known as the Collection Room. The building has won several awards for architecture, including the J. W. Wilson Award for 'Building of the Year' in central Queensland; the Queensland 'State Award for Public Architecture'; the 'Walls' category of the Queensland 'Public Domain Awards 2013'; and the Kevin Cavanagh Medal, the Concrete Institute of Australia's highest national award for 'Excellence in Concrete'. It was also shortlisted in the 'Culture' category of the World Architecture Festival Awards in 2012 and again in 2013 under the 'Display' category.

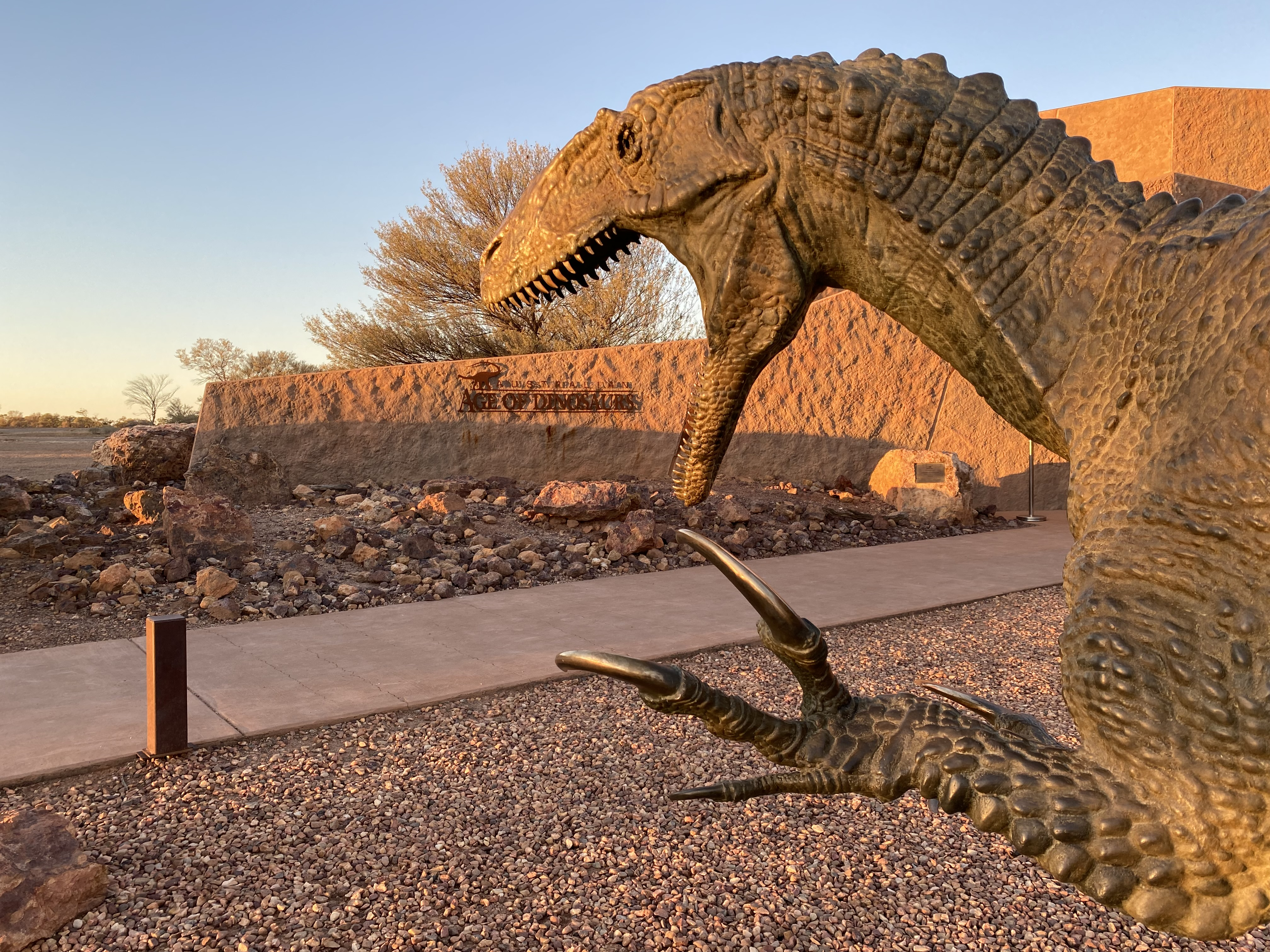
Australovenator in the early morning

A life-sized, 5-meter-long bronze statue of Australovenator ("Banjo") stands at the entrance to the reception center. Digitally sculpted by AAOD palaeo-artist Travis R. Tischler, the statue was cast by Deep in the Heart Foundry, Texas, USA. It was funded by the John Villiers Trust and erected in front of the reception center in April 2012.

==== Collections Room ====
The Collections Room inside the Reception Center is a climate-controlled room that houses the museum's holotype and paratype fossil specimens. The specimens are displayed in a semi-circle around a public stage where visitors can view the fossils as part of daily guided tours run by the museum. The holotype fossil bones of Australia's most complete sauropod dinosaurs, Diamantinasaurus matildae ("Matilda") and Savannasaurus elliottorum ("Wade"), as well as the most complete theropod dinosaur, Australovenator wintonensis ("Banjo"), and the most complete pterosaur, "Ferrodraco lentoni" ("Butch"), are on display. The Collection Room is fitted with audiovisual equipment that complements the guided tours by showing animation footage of western Queensland's dinosaurs. This footage consists of excerpts from the documentary Monsters in the Outback, which was produced for the museum by Bearcage Studios in 2013 through funding provided to AAOD by BHP.

=== Dinosaur Canyon Outpost and Outdoor Galleries ===
Dinosaur Canyon Outpost and Outdoor Galleries were finished in April 2017 through a combination of government funds, private sponsorship and the museum's contributions from operating funds. The new attraction consists of an Outpost perched on the cliff overlooking Dinosaur Canyon and includes 300 metres of elevated concrete pathway throughout the gorge below. Five outdoor galleries are positioned along the pathway, which resembles a treetop walk as it winds through massive boulders and thick vegetation below the rim of a gorge. The Dinosaur Canyon exhibits recreate life as it would have appeared during the Cretaceous Period, including Dinosaur Stampede, Pterodactylus Family, Kunbarrasaurus ieversi, Death in the Billabong and Valley of the Cycads.

=== The March of the Titanosaurs exhibition ===
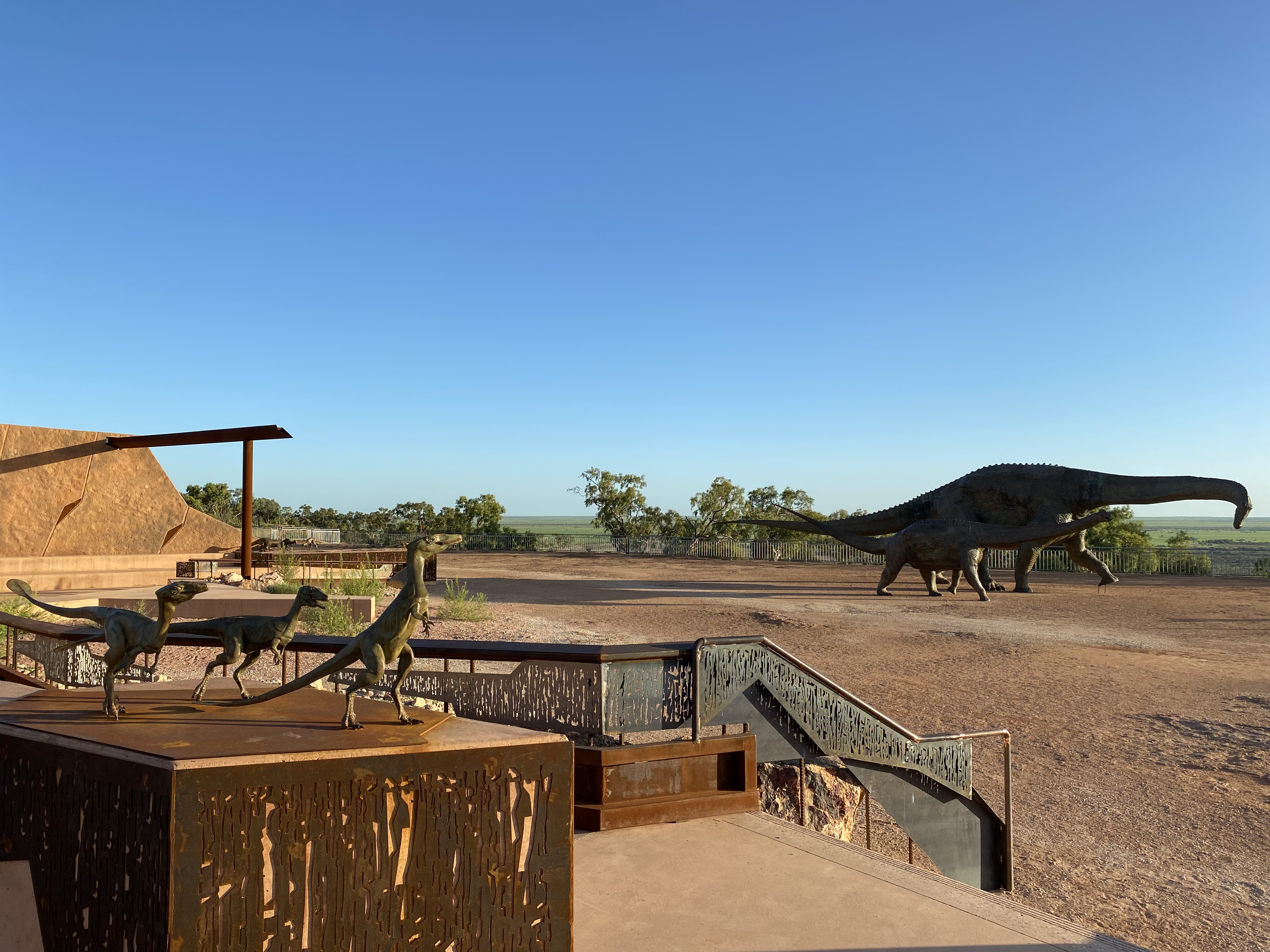
Bronze sauropods and coelurosaurs outside the "March of the Titanosaurs" exhibition

The March of the Titanosaurs exhibition was finished in May 2021 as part of the Dynamic Destination project, funded through the Growing Tourism Infrastructure Fund. The building was built to house a 55m long tracksite relocated to The Jump-Up from 2018 to 2021. The tracksite features trace fossils of sauropods, theropods, ornithopods, crocodiles, turtles and lungfish.

== Fossils ==
=== Dating ===
Most of the dinosaur fossils discovered by the AAOD Museum are from the earliest Late Cretaceous period and are approximately 98-95 million years old. This has been determined using radiometric dating of zircons - tiny grains which fall between 60 and 200 microns that form part of the sandstones which make up the Winton Formation. Measuring radiogenic isotopes within individual zircon grains taken from the "Matilda site" confirmed an Early Cenomanian age, meaning that the sites in that area are at least as young as 95 million years.

=== Winton Formation ===
The Winton Formation is a paralic to a terrestrial/freshwater deposit that is a remnant of a vast network of river floodplains that drained northward into the Eromanga Sea in the late Albian to Cenomanian stages of the Cretaceous period. The deposit is up to 1.2 km thick in southwest Queensland and becomes thinner as it extends north toward Winton due to both erosion and original distribution. The Winton Formation thins out just north of Winton due to regional dip and the semicircular outcrop pattern of the Eromanga Basin. Winton Formation overlies the older marine deposits of the Mackunda Formation. The Mackunda Formation represents the final phase of the inland sea that receded from the Winton area approximately 100-98 million years ago. The bones of "Elliot" and "Wade" were discovered 80 km north-east of Winton and were deposited very close to the shores of the retreating inland sea. The Winton Formation has produced the remains of more large dinosaurs than the rest of Australia combined, making it the country's most extensive and prolific dinosaur deposit.

=== The Great Australian Basin ===
The Great Australian Basin occupies nearly one-fifth of the Australian continent and includes three constituent basins in central and northern Queensland: the Carpentaria Basin in the north, the Eromanga Basin in the center and south and the Surat Basin in the far southeast. Over a period of 30 million years, the Great Australian Basin has been flooded by five phases of inland seas. Those that left a surface fossil record are the early Aptian Sea (125 – 120 million years ago); the late Aptian Sea (116-112 million years ago); the early middle Albian Sea (108-105 million years ago) and the late Albian Sea (104-100 million years ago). The Winton Formation is situated in the Eromanga Basin and is the youngest (uppermost) deposit laid down during the formation of that basin. This terrestrial deposit ended 30 million years of marine domination and heralded a new phase of deposition that would see the Basin become a place of lush open forests and flood plains dominated by conifers, intricate river systems and a significant dinosaur fauna.

Over the 98 million years following its final development phase, the Eromanga Basin has undergone periods of deep weathering, erosion and uplift, which have exposed the basin as it is found today. It is this process that has exposed the fossil-rich marine rocks to the north of Winton that were deposited in the latter stages of the Basin's formation between 125 and 100 million years ago and continues to produce the fossils of Australia's Cretaceous dinosaurs throughout the Winton Formation.

=== The Jump-Up ===
The Jump-Up is a large mesa plateau that is approximately 270m above sea level and stands 75m above the surrounding land and forms part of a mesa formation called the Vindex Range. Like much of the Winton Shire, the Jump-Up is part of the Winton Formation, which is dated around 95-98 million years old. The cap-rock surface of the Jump-Up is solid rock of varying thickness up to 12 metres that has resisted erosion throughout a period of deep weathering that eroded the surrounding countryside away. The top of the Jump-Up represents the land surface prior to this weathering phase, which is estimated by geologists to have commenced between 25mya and 30mya. The Jump-Up is home to a diverse fauna including numerous lizard species, echidna and over 100 species of birds. It is also home to a unique floral biodiversity that includes rain forest fig species that have survived in the moist, sheltered gorges – remnant species of a time when inland Australia had a much wetter climate. In 2019 the Jump-Up was designated Australia's first International Dark-Sky Sanctuary by the International Dark-Sky Association. The area met the criteria for land that has a distinguished quality of starry nights and a nocturnal environment that is protected in a very remote location with few nearby threats to the quality of its dark night skies.

== Australian Age of Dinosaurs Journals ==
Since 2003, Australian Age of Dinosaurs has published an annual journal on Australian natural history. The journal is compiled and edited by David Elliott and Judy Elliott and incorporates the scientific research and life's work of Australia's leading palaeontologists. The journal gives an up-to-date account of the Australian Age of Dinosaurs Museum's annual progress, along with an overview of scientific discussions, scientific research processes and an annual profile of palaeontologists who have devoted a large part of their lives to better understanding our knowledge of the Australian continent. The journal is distributed each year to subscribing members who receive a variety of discounts and special offers, and a quarterly newsletter. The museum also offers Million Year Membership, which includes life membership along with invitations to special events, lifelong free entry to the museum and the option of becoming a member of AAOD Ltd. In its fourteenth year the AAOD journal continues to be an unmatched repository of Australian dinosaur information and palaeo news in Australia.

== Public involvement ==
=== Prep-A-Dino Experience ===
The Australian Age of Dinosaurs has an active preparation program for public involvement through its Prep-A-Dino program. The process of preparing a dinosaur bone is a time-consuming job which involves carefully chipping away layers of stone to reveal the embedded dinosaur bone inside. The museum offers a fully inducted training session and tour of the museum before participants embark on prepping a dinosaur bone. The museum offers onsite accommodation at Maloney Lodge as part of its Prep-A-Dino package. The lodge consists of five furnished rooms, a communal kitchen and a fully equipped bathroom/ laundry. Maloney Lodge was completed in 2010 and offers laboratory participants the chance to work and live at a real dinosaur museum. Prep-A-Dino participants can qualify as an honorary technician after completing 10 days of preparation and training with the Australian Age of Dinosaurs. Although the initial 10-day training period attracts a daily charge, once participants become qualified honorary technicians, their only further cost is an annual one day refresher course.

=== Dig-A-Dinosaur Experience ===
Since 2004, the museum has hosted dinosaur digs that can be attended by members of the public. Digs are usually held in late May and early June and attract a participation charge which helps cover the cost of holding the dig and preparation of fossils recovered. The digs take place in the Mitchell grass downs country of the Winton district, and have produced numerous dinosaur fossils, many of which have become holotype specimens. On the Elliotts' property alone, there have been 15 confirmed sites identified across the 18,000-hectare Station.

== Researchers ==
The AAOD collection has attracted considerable interest from palaeontologists, both in Australia and abroad. Palaeontologists closely involved with the museum collection include, in alphabetical order:

=== Dr. Alex Cook ===
As former curator of Invertebrate Palaeontology and Senior Curator of Geosciences at the Queensland Museum, Alex Cook is a widely published researcher who is recognized for his work on invertebrate faunas of the Great Artesian Basin and the Palaeozoic of north Queensland. Cook has been Honorary Curator of the AAOD Museum Collection since 2004 and continues a strong association with the museum through the acquisition and curation of fossils representing Australia's major evolutionary sequences in preparation for public exhibition. In 2018, the museum's second publication, Geology of Outback Queensland, written by Cook, was published.

=== Dr. Scott Hocknull ===
Scott Hocknull is Senior Curator of Vertebrate Palaeontology at the Queensland Museum. He was the first author on a paper published by PLoS One in 2009 that named three new Australian dinosaur species from the Winton Formation, including Diamantinasaurus matildae, Australovenator wintonensis, and Wintonotitan wattsi. Hocknull is currently spearheading ground-breaking research into the Dinosaur Stampede National Monument at Lark Quarry near Winton.

=== Dr. Benjamin Kear ===
Benjamin Kear is an assistant professor and docent in historical geology and palaeontology at Uppsala University in Sweden. He is carrying out an initial descriptive survey of marine fossils in the AAOD Collection recovered from the uppermost Mackunda Formation near Winton. These specimens, which include marine reptiles, turtles, and fish, were recovered in close proximity to Winton Formation dinosaur bones on Belmont Station. Kear's research will ascertain what taxa are present in the assemblage and enable him to compile a taxonomic list for a quantitative survey of marine vertebrate biodiversity across the Aptian-Cenomanian within the Eromanga Basin.

=== Dr. Ada Klinkhamer ===
In August 2017, Ada Klinkhamer completed a PhD on sauropod appendicular musculature and biomechanics, with a focus on Diamantinasaurus matildae from the Australian Age of Dinosaurs Museum. To date, she has had two papers from her dissertation published, both of which involve Diamantinasaurus matildae.

=== Dr. Stephen McLoughlin ===
Stephen McLoughlin is a palaeobotanist with the Department of Palaeobiology, Swedish Museum of Natural History who has carried out research on the fossil flora of the Winton Formation since the mid-1990s. In recent years, he has studied bennettitalean, conifer, and horsetail fossils from Belmont Station held in the AAOD Museum collection. The significance of the Winton Formation fossil flora is that it represents the youngest major assemblage of plant fossils from the Cretaceous of Australia. Stratigraphically, the next major plant assemblage on the continent is from the late Paleocene, some 35 million years later. The Winton Formation plant assemblage marks the transition from gymnosperm to angiosperm dominance in the Australian flora. The Winton Formation flora is now known to contain over 50 macrofossil plant taxa. Significantly, this assemblage contains the youngest Australian fossils of equisetaleans, pentoxylaleans, and possibly bennettitaleans, all groups that appear to have succumbed to competition from the rapidly diversifying angiosperms of this time. One of the youngest records of Ginkgo leaves from Australia also comes from the Winton Formation. Araucarian, cupressacean, and podocarp conifers are all well represented in the fossil flora. The flowering plants represented in this flora have mostly toothed or lobed leaf types and are of possible fagaceous or betulaceous affinities, but their precise relationships remain unclear. The oldest Australian monocot angiosperms are also known from this formation. The composition of the flora and morphological characters of the leaves and woods attest to growth in a cool seasonal climate without extremes of precipitation.

=== Adele Pentland ===
Adele Pentland is a PhD candidate at Swinburne University of Technology and a research associate at the AAOD Museum. She is currently researching Australian pterosaurs. In October 2019, she scientifically described Australia's most complete pterosaur specimen as a new taxon, Ferrodraco lentoni.

=== Dr. Stephen Poropat ===
Stephen Poropat is a postdoctoral researcher in palaeontology at Swinburne University of Technology. From October 2011 to January 2015, he was a postdoctoral research fellow at Uppsala University in Sweden. In 2015, he revised Diamantinasaurus matildae and Wintonotitan wattsi and in 2016, he scientifically described one of Australia's most complete sauropod specimens as the new taxon Savannasaurus elliottorum. In 2016, Poropat also described the first sauropod skull ever recovered from Australia and referred it to Diamantinasaurus matildae.; The braincase is currently on display at the AAOD Museum. More recently, Poropat published a revision of the holotype of Austrosaurus mckillopi, a sauropod from near Richmond, and he is currently conducting research on other Cretaceous Queensland sauropod material curated at AAOD. He has been working extensively with Paul Upchurch (University College London) and Philip Mannion (Imperial College London) on a revision of Australia's Cretaceous sauropod fauna.

=== Travis Tischler ===
Travis Tischler, an Australian palaeo-artist, has been working closely with the AAOD Museum since 2006. He has been in charge of AAOD's digital dinosaur reconstruction program since 2009 and has developed highly detailed and anatomically accurate flesh restorations through the use of digital modeling. Through a combination of CAT scans, MRI scans, and photogrammetry modeling, Tischler has been able to digitally recreate and restore dinosaur fossils into full skeletons. By studying their range of motion, muscle attachment scars, and structural capacities, he has created "reverse dissection" models of dinosaur musculature, providing an accurate body form on which detailed, functional skin interpretations can be reconstructed.

=== Dr Paul Upchurch and Dr Philip Mannion ===
Paul Upchurch is a Reader in Palaeobiology at University College London and Philip Mannion is a Junior Research Fellow at Imperial College London. Both Upchurch and Mannion have visited the AAOD Collection and have formed a collaborative affiliation with Poropat and Hocknull. The aim of this project is a thorough revision of the Australian Cretaceous sauropod fauna, with a view to establishing the relationships of Australia's sauropods to those throughout the world.

=== Dr Matt White ===
Matt White completed a PhD on the reconstruction and biomechanics of Australovenator wintonensis. He has authored several papers on new skeletal elements of Australovenator which have been uncovered following the holotype description. His research includes working on skeletal range of motion to rebuild the muscles and tendons of Australovenator's forearms and hind limbs. White has been working with radiographer Sarah Wooldridge and staff at Queensland Xray in Mackay to CT scan all of the Australovenator material along with other types of material from the AAOD Museum collection. These scans have been converted to three dimensional images which have been used in publications and dinosaur reconstruction.

== Future plans ==
The AAOD Museum's third and final stage consists of a purpose built, multimillion-dollar natural history museum that will portray the evolution of the Australian continent over the past 4.5 billion years and Australia's unique dinosaur heritage. The new museum building, which will include education facilities, was planned for 2022, and initial work including concept planning and design has been completed.

The AAOD Museum of Natural History will be located 2 km from the museum's Reception Centre and positioned overlooking the plains below the Jump-Up. The building's concept statistics allow for a floor space of 6,000 square meters, of which 1,800 square metres will be exhibition floor space. The remainder of the building's planned space will be divided among public space, gift shop and café facilities, back–of-house management, collection room, laboratory, school classrooms and audiovisual facilities. Other exhibitions currently being planned for the AAOD Museum include a suite of outdoor galleries that will be positioned throughout the gorge of the Jump-Up. These galleries will exhibit life-size bronze sculptures of Australia's dinosaurs; their environment and initial construction on the first of these is currently underway.
