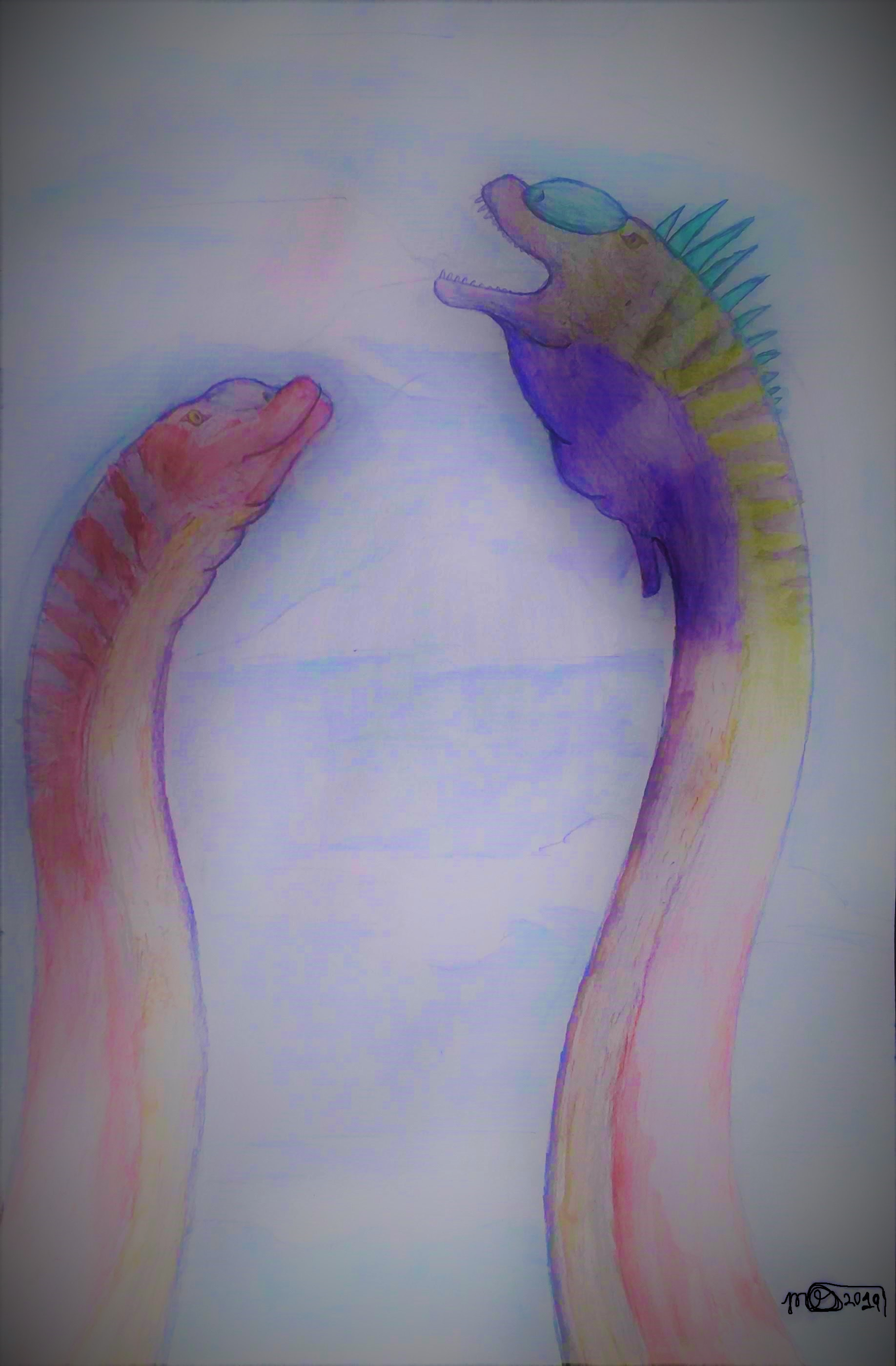
- Illustration of two individuals engaging in a hypothetical courtship behavior

Scientific classification
- Kingdom: Animalia
- Phylum: Chordata
- Class: Reptilia
- Clade: Dinosauria
- Clade: Saurischia
- Clade: †Sauropodomorpha
- Clade: †Sauropoda
- Clade: †Macronaria
- Clade: †Titanosauria
- Clade: †Lithostrotia
- Genus: †Mnyamawamtuka; Gorscak and O'Connor, 2019

Type species
- †Mnyamawamtuka moyowamkia Gorscak and O'Connor, 2019

= Mnyamawamtuka =

Mnyamawamtuka Temporal range: Early Cretaceous, 110–100 Ma

Genus of lithostrotian dinosaur from the Early Cretaceous period

Mnyamawamtuka (Swahili pronunciation: [m̩ˌɲamawam̩ˈtukə]; meaning "beast of the Mtuka river drainage" in Kiswahili) is a genus of lithostrotian titanosaur sauropod dinosaur from the Cretaceous Galula Formation in Tanzania. The type and only species is M. moyowamkia.

== Discovery and naming ==
In 2004, a sauropod skeleton was found at the Mtuka River, twenty kilometres from Lake Rukwa. It was excavated between 2005 and 2008.

In 2019, the type species Mnyamawamtuka moyowamkia was named and described by Eric Gorscak and Patrick M. O'Connor. The generic name is a contraction of the Kiswahili Mnyama wa Mtuka, the "Beast of the Mtuka". The describers made explicit that they considered "beast" to be an apt name for a member of the Titanosauria. The specific name is a contraction of moyo wa mkia, meaning the "heart of the tail" in Kiswahili, a reference to the heart-shaped cross-section of the rear facet of the middle tail vertebrae.

The holotype, RRBP 05834, was found in a layer of the Mtuka Member of the Galula Formation dating from the Aptian-Cenomanian, most likely between 110 and 100 million years old. It consists of a partial skeleton, lacking the skull. It contains a neural arch of a front neck vertebra, centra of four neck vertebrae, seven back vertebrae, seven neural arches and seven centra of tail vertebrae, four chevrons, numerous rib pieces, a right shoulder blade, a right breastbone, both humeri, a left ulna, a right first metacarpal, a left third metacarpal, the left ischium, the right pubic bone, both thighbones, both shinbones, the left calfbone, the left metatarsus, two toe phalanges and a foot claw. The skeleton was not articulated. Despite the missing skull, it represents one of the most complete known skeletons of early titanosaurs.

== Description ==
The holotype individual had an estimated length of 7.6 metres and a weight of 1.5 tonnes. It probably was not fully grown.

The describing authors indicated some distinguishing traits. Five of these are autapomorphies, unique derived characters. The middle and rear dorsal (back) vertebrae have an accessory ridge or lamina, forked at the top, located between the normal ridge connecting the front articular processes and the neural channel. The rear back vertebrae lack a ridge connecting the rear articular processes because the ridge on the rear of the neural process runs all the way down to the neural channel. The middle tail vertebrae have a vertebral body of which the rear face is widened to above and sideways, resulting in a heart-shape. The upper inner side of the front edge of the shoulder blade, the part touching the coracoid, features a curved crest running parallel to a groove. Each of the paired breast bone plates is exceptionally small, equalling just 42% of the length of the humerus.

== Phylogeny ==
Mnyamawamtuka was placed in the Titanosauria in 2019. Cladistic analyses indicated several possible positions in the evolutionary tree. Mnyamawamtuka was sometimes recovered outside of the Lithostrotia. Alternatively, it was positioned in a basal position within the lithostrotians, as sister species of Malawisaurus.
