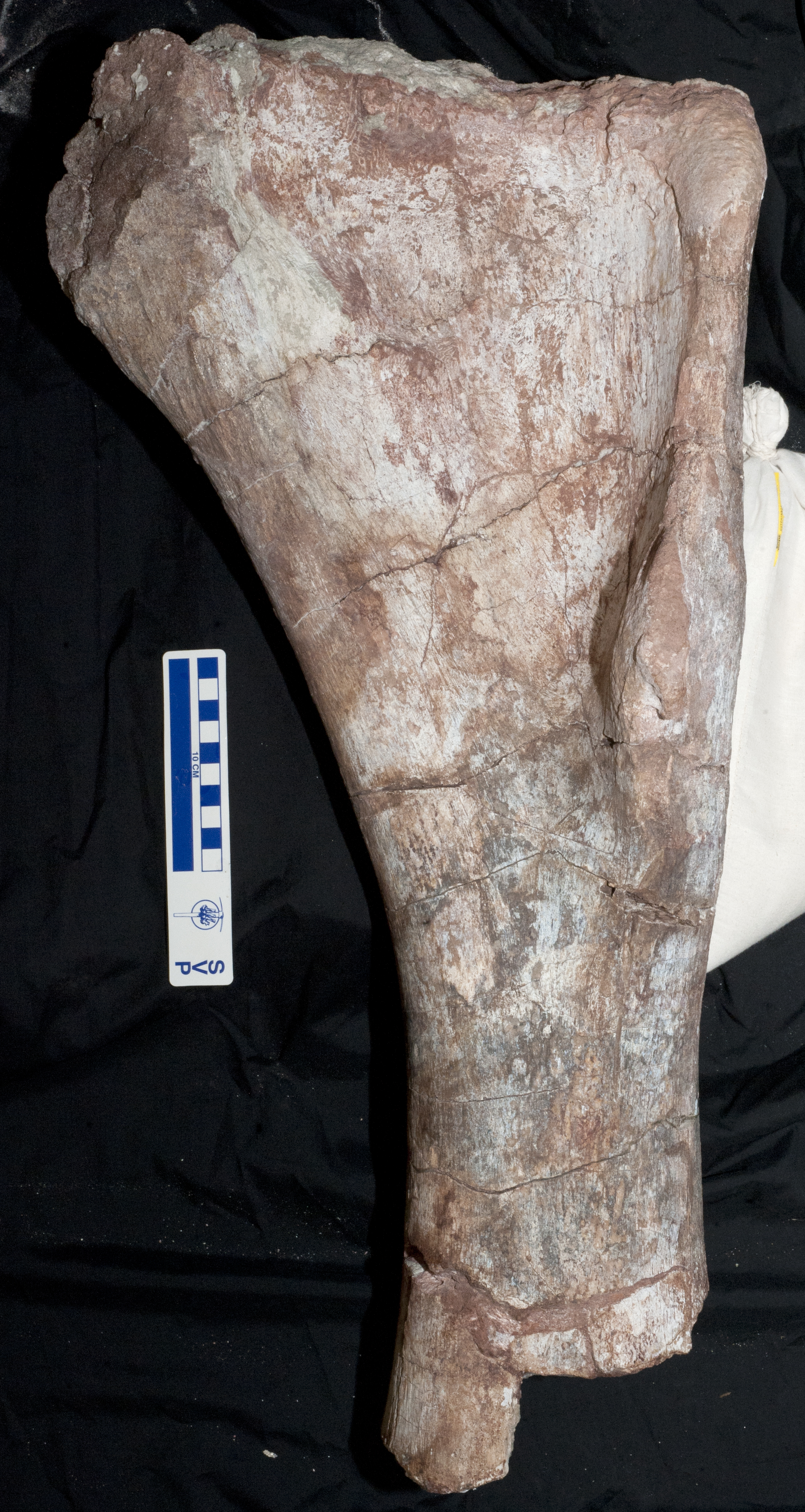
- Holotype humerus in anterior view with scale bar

Scientific classification
- Kingdom: Animalia
- Phylum: Chordata
- Class: Reptilia
- Clade: Dinosauria
- Clade: Saurischia
- Clade: †Sauropodomorpha
- Clade: †Sauropoda
- Clade: †Macronaria
- Clade: †Titanosauria
- Clade: †Lithostrotia
- Genus: †Rukwatitan; Gorscak et al., 2014

Type species
- †Rukwatitan bisepultus Gorscak et al., 2014

= Rukwatitan =

Rukwatitan Temporal range: Cenomanian, 100 Ma

Extinct genus of dinosaurs

Rukwatitan is a genus of titanosaur sauropod dinosaur from the Galula Formation in Tanzania. It lived around 100 million years ago, during the middle Cretaceous. The species, which shared features with another southern African species, Malawisaurus dixeyi, measured 30 feet (9.1 m) from the head to the tip of the tail, and had forelimbs that were estimated around 6.5 feet (2.0 m) long. Its fossils were found embedded in a cliff face near Lake Rukwa in the Rukwa Valley, from which it gets its name.
