= Rukwa Rift Basin =

Endorheic rift basin in southwestern Tanzania

Coordinates: 8.16305°S 32.56492°E

The Rukwa Rift Basin, located in southwestern Tanzania, is an endorheic rift basin that contains Lake Rukwa. It forms part of the East African Rift system and has produced a number of Cretaceous and Oligocene fossils.

== Stratigraphy ==
Stratigraphy of the Rukwa Rift basin
Time period		Group	Formation	Member
Cenozoic	Pliocene-Holocene		Lake Beds sequence	Upper Member
Cenozoic	Pliocene-Holocene		Lake Beds sequence	Lower Member
Cenozoic	Unconformity			
Cenozoic	Oligocene	Red Sandstone Group	Nsungwe Formation	Songwe Member
Cenozoic	Oligocene	Red Sandstone Group	Nsungwe Formation	Utengule Member
Unconformity		Red Sandstone Group	Unconformity	
Mesozoic	Cretaceous	Red Sandstone Group	Galula Formation	Namba Member
Mesozoic	Cretaceous	Red Sandstone Group	Galula Formation	Mtuka Member
Unconformity
Paleozoic	Latest Carboniferous-Late Permian	Karoo Supergroup		
