= Invictibellatrix =

Invictibellatrix Temporal range: Early Cretaceous, Barremian
- Photographs (left) and line drawings (right) of the holotype specimen

Scientific classification
- Kingdom: Animalia
- Phylum: Chordata
- Class: Reptilia
- Clade: Dinosauria
- Clade: Saurischia
- Clade: Theropoda
- Clade: †Megaraptora
- Genus: †Invictibellatrix; Morrison et al., 2026
- Species: †I. amberina

Binomial name
- †Invictibellatrix amberina Morrison et al., 2026

Genus of theropod dinosaur

Invictibellatrix (Latin: "unconquered woman warrior") is an extinct genus of megaraptoran theropod dinosaur known from the Early Cretaceous (Barremian age) Wessex Formation of England. The genus contains a single species, Invictibellatrix amberina, known from a single braincase.

== Discovery and naming ==
The Invictibellatrix fossil material was discovered in outcrops of the Wessex Formation on the Isle of Wight, United Kingdom. The specimen is housed in the Natural History Museum in London, where it is permanently accessioned as specimen NHMUK PV R 6775. It was sold to the museum in May 1924 by the widow of the collector Reginald Walter Hooley. It consists of an isolated braincase (part of the skull that houses the brain). Prior to the formal naming of Invictibellatrix, the fossil material was reported in a conference abstract in 2024. In 2026, Cassius Morrison and colleagues described Invictibellatrix amberina as a new genus and species of megaraptoran theropod based on these fossil remains, designating NHMUK PV R 6775 as the holotype specimen.

== Description ==
Speculative life restoration

Invictibellatrix is estimated to have a body mass between 200–300 kg (440–660 lb) and a body length of around 4 m (13 ft).

Three autapomorphies (unique derived traits) were recognized. On each side of the parabasisphenoíd in front of the recessus tympanicus anterior, a small recessus basipterygoideus is present. The crest on the back of the skull is lightly transversely compressed and has an hourglass profile. On the crest, distinctive, lightly curved depressions are present on the midline.

== Phylogeny ==
In their 2026 description of Invictibellatrix, Morrison and colleagues tested the affinities of this taxon using multiple phylogenetic matrices and analytical techniques. These generally recovered Invictibellatrix as a derived member of the megaraptoran family Megaraptoridae, which is otherwise almost entirely restricted to the Late Cretaceous of Gondwana. A close relationship with Murusraptor—one of the few megaraptorans that preserves braincase material—was consistently recovered. Using a fossilized birth–death analysis (a method that incorporates the stratigraphic ranges of taxa studied) of the Aranciaga Rolando et al. (2022) dataset, Invictibellatrix was instead recovered in a more basal position within Megaraptora, outside of the Megaraptoridae, a position much more consistent with its early occurrence. These results are displayed in the cladogram below:

- Megaraptora
  - Phuwiangvenator
  - - Vayuraptor
    - - Invictibellatrix
      - - Fukuiraptor
        - Megaraptoridae
          - NMV P229038
          - - - LRF 100 106
              - Australovenator
            - - Murusraptor
              - - Megaraptor
                - - Tratayenia
                  - - Aerosteon
                    - - Orkoraptor
                      - Maip
