= Rinconraptor =

Rinconraptor Temporal range: Late Cretaceous, Santonian
- Reconstructed skeleton

Scientific classification
- Kingdom: Animalia
- Phylum: Chordata
- Class: Reptilia
- Clade: Dinosauria
- Clade: Saurischia
- Clade: Theropoda
- Clade: †Megaraptora
- Family: †Megaraptoridae
- Genus: †Rinconraptor; Méndez et al., 2026
- Species: †R. pipoae

Binomial name
- †Rinconraptor pipoae Méndez et al., 2026

Genus of theropod dinosaur

Rinconraptor (lit. 'Rincón thief') is an extinct genus of megaraptorid theropod dinosaur known from the Late Cretaceous (Santonian age) Bajo de la Carpa Formation of Argentina. The genus contains a single species, Rinconraptor pipoae, known from a partial postcranial skeleton including a partial arm and leg bone and several tail vertebrae.

== Discovery and naming ==
The Rinconraptor fossil material was discovered during a series of successive expeditions in outcrops of the Bajo de la Carpa Formation (Cerro Overo locality) in 2014, 2015, 2019, 2023, and 2025, 50 kilometres (31 mi) southwest of Rincón de Los Sauces in Neuquén Province, Argentina. The specimen is housed in the Museo Municipal "Argentino Urquiza" in Rincón de Los Sauces, where it is permanently accessioned as specimen MAU-Pv-CO-659. It consists of the distal (lower) end of the left humerus, the proximal end of the right tibia, the isolated centra of ten caudal vertebrae, and the upper half of a chevron. Aside from the tibia, these remains were found scattered around the surface of a 4 m² area.

In 2026, Ariel H. Méndez and colleagues described Rinconraptor pipoae as a new genus and species of megaraptoran dinosaur based on these fossil remains, designating MAU-Pv-CO-659 as the holotype specimen. The generic name, Rinconraptor, combines a reference to the discovery of the only known specimen near Rincón de Los Sauces with the Latin word raptor, meaning 'thief'. The specific name, pipoae, honors Laura Pipo, a PhD student who assisted with the fieldwork that resulted in the holotype's discovery.

Méndez et al. also described some additional theropod remains from other Bajo de la Carpa Formation sites as belonging to indeterminate megaraptorids. These include the upper half of an ulna, a manual phalanx (finger bone), and an anterior (toward the front) dorsal and caudal vertebra. A lack of overlap with the Rinconraptor material—or the coeval Tratayenia, which also cannot be compared to Rinconraptor—precluded their assignment to a more specific taxon.

== Description ==
Size compared to a human

Rinconraptor is regarded as a medium- to large-sized megaraptoran, with an estimated body length of 7 metres (23 ft). Autapomorphies (unique derived features) of R. pipoae include the ectepicondyle being separated from the distal end of the humerus, the lateral (outer) margin of the tibia being straight when seen from above (proximal view), and the tibia's cnemial crest and medial condyle having a subrectangular shape. It can further be distinguished from most other megaraptorans by having an anterodistally-oriented ridge on the humerus (a feature otherwise seen only in Megaraptor) and an incisura tibialis (a notch near the lateral condyle) that forms a right angle (only seen in Fukuiraptor).

== Classification ==
Life restoration

To test the affinities and relationships of Rinconraptor, Méndez et al. (2026) included it in an updated version of the phylogenetic matrix of Ibiricu et al. (2025). The implied weighting tree after pruning Aoniraptor to improve resolution of the results placed Rinconraptor as the sister taxon to Megaraptor, in a clade also including Murusraptor and an unnamed taxon from the Bajo Barreal Formation which they called "Clade C". Their analysis recovered megaraptorans as part of the theropod clade Coelurosauria, as the sister group to the Tyrannosauroidea. These results are displayed in the cladogram below:

- Megaraptora
  - Phuwiangvenator yaemniyomi
  - - - Fukuiraptor kitadaniensis
      - Vayuraptor nongbualamphuensis
    - Megaraptoridae
      - LRF 100–106
        (Lightning Ridge taxon)
      - - Australovenator wintonensis
        - CLADE A
          - Orkoraptor burkei
          - - Joaquinraptor casali
            - - CLADE B
                - Tratayenia rosalesi
                - - Aerosteon riocoloradensis
                  - Maip macrothorax
              - CLADE C
                - - Murusraptor barrosaensis
                  - UNPSJB-PV 944 & 958
                    (Bajo Barreal Fm. taxon)
                - - Megaraptor namunhuaiquii
                  - Rinconraptor pipoae

== Paleoecology ==
Rinconraptor is known from the Bajo de la Carpa Formation, which dates to the Santonian age of the late Cretaceous period. Its sediments represent fluvial and aeolian systems, with a semi-arid paleoenvironment. In addition to Rinconraptor, several dinosaurs are known from this formation. Theropods include the fellow megaraptorid Tratayenia, abelisauroids (Velocisaurus, Llukalkan, and Viavenator), alvarezsaurids (Achillesaurus and Alvarezsaurus), the unenlagiine paravian Diuqin, and the avialans (birds, in the broad sense) Neuquenornis and Patagopteryx. Other dinosaurs include the elasmarian ornithopod Mahuidacursor and diverse titanosaurian sauropods, such as Bonitasaura, Inawentu, Overosaurus, Rinconsaurus, Traukutitan, and Yeneen. Non-dinosaurian fauna includes indeterminate pterosaurs and fossil snakes (Dinilysia), lizards (Paleochelco), turtles (Lomalatachelys), and several crocodyliforms.
