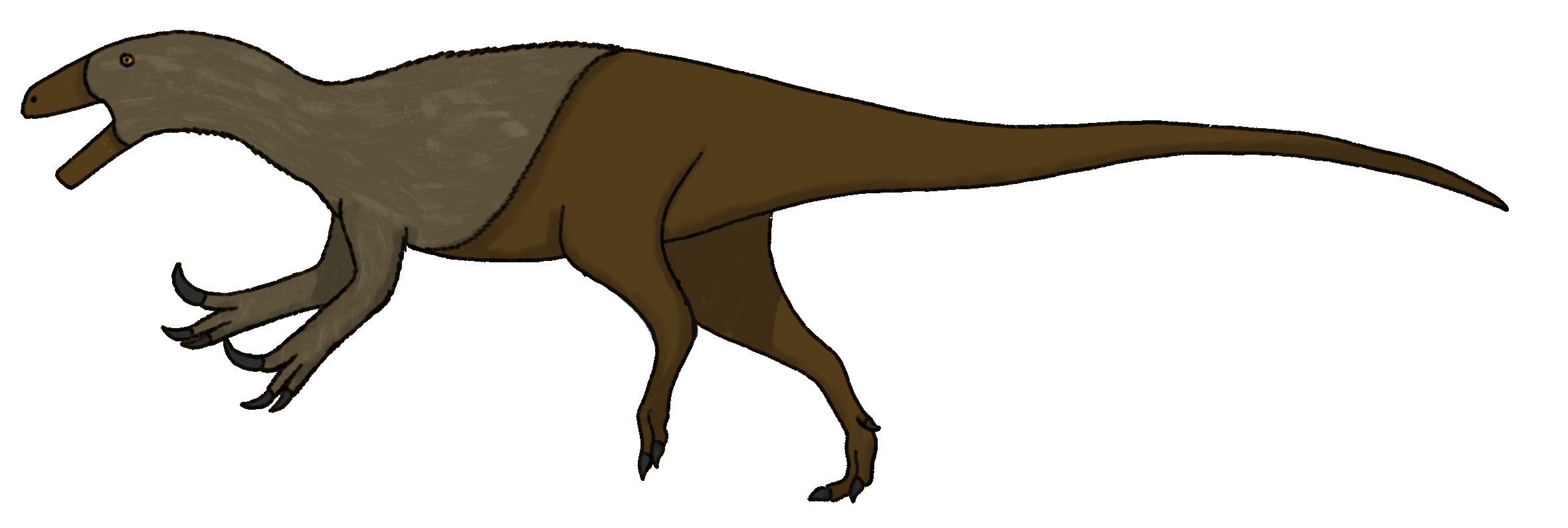
- Speculative life restoration

Scientific classification
- Kingdom: Animalia
- Phylum: Chordata
- Clade: Dinosauria
- Clade: Saurischia
- Clade: Theropoda
- Clade: †Megaraptora
- Genus: †Aoniraptor; Motta et al., 2016
- Species: †A. libertatem

Binomial name
- †Aoniraptor libertatem Motta et al., 2016

= Aoniraptor =

Aoniraptor Temporal range: Early Cretaceous (Albian), 106.2 Ma

Extinct genus of theropod dinosaurs

Aoniraptor is an extinct genus of megaraptoran theropod dinosaurs from the Early Cretaceous Huincul Formation of Argentina. The genus contains a single species, Aoniraptor libertatem, known from a partial skeleton.

== Discovery and naming ==
The holotype, MPCA-Pv 804/1 to 804/25, which consists of the last sacral vertebra, six proximal caudal vertebrae, four mid-caudal vertebrae, and five haemal arches, was recovered by Matias Motta from the Violante Farm, part of the Huincul Formation. It was discovered in 2010, but only formally described in 2016.

Aoniraptor comes from the Tehuelche language word "Aoni", which means south, and the Latin word "raptor", meaning thief. The specific name, libertatem, comes from the Latin word for freedom, as it was discovered on the bicentennial of Argentina's independence from Spain in 1810.

== Description ==
Aoniraptor grew up to 6 metres (20 ft) long.

On some blogs, Aoniraptor has been informally considered as synonymous with the theropod Gualicho, described from the same formation, due to the similarities of their caudal vertebrae. If this were supported, the name Gualicho would have precedent. Aranciaga Rolando et al. in 2020 performed a comparative analysis between the pneumatic structures of Aoniraptor and Gualicho, and found many differences between the two.

== Classification ==
Phylogenetic analyses including Aoniraptor recover it as a megaraptoran. The results of the phylogenetic analysis of Rolando et al. (2022) are displayed in the cladogram below:

- Megaraptora
  - Phuwiangvenator
  - - Vayuraptor
    - Fukuiraptor
    - Megaraptoridae
      - Australian megaraptorid indet. (LRF 100–106)
      - - Australovenator
        - "Clade A"
          - Aoniraptor
          - - Bajo Barreal Formation megaraptorid indet. (UNPSJB-Pv 944/958)
            - - Megaraptor
              - - Murusraptor
                - "Clade B"
                  - Orkoraptor
                  - Tratayenia
                  - Maip
                  - Aerosteon

== See also ==
- 2016 in archosaur paleontology
