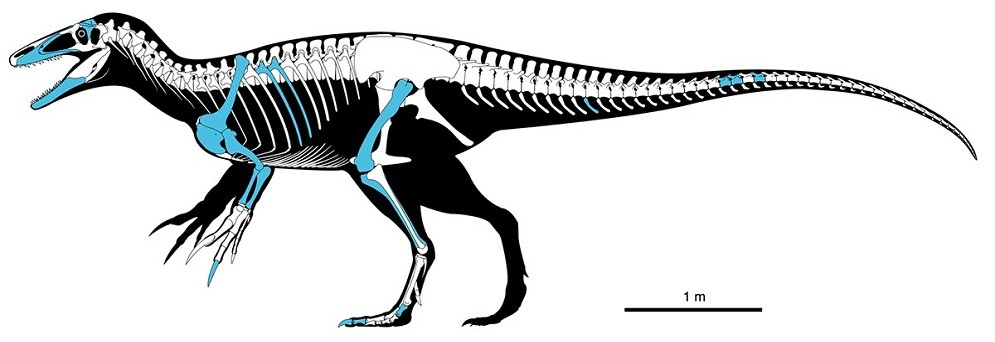
- Reconstructed skeleton, with known material in blue

Scientific classification
- Kingdom: Animalia
- Phylum: Chordata
- Class: Reptilia
- Clade: Dinosauria
- Clade: Saurischia
- Clade: Theropoda
- Clade: †Megaraptora
- Family: †Megaraptoridae
- Genus: †Joaquinraptor; Ibiricu et al., 2025
- Species: †J. casali

Binomial name
- †Joaquinraptor casali Ibiricu et al., 2025

= Joaquinraptor =

Joaquinraptor Temporal range: Late Cretaceous, Maastrichtian

Genus of megaraptorid theropod dinosaurs

Joaquinraptor (hwa-KEEN-rap-tor) is an extinct genus of megaraptorid theropod dinosaurs known from the Late Cretaceous Lago Colhué Huapi Formation of Argentina. The genus contains a single species, Joaquinraptor casali, representing the youngest (most recent) definitive megaraptoran. It is known from a partially articulated, incomplete skeleton including vertebrae and bones of the skull, forelimbs and hindlimbs, and pectoral girdle, making it one of the most completely known members of the Megaraptora. It was likely at least 7 metres (23 ft) long.

== Discovery and naming ==
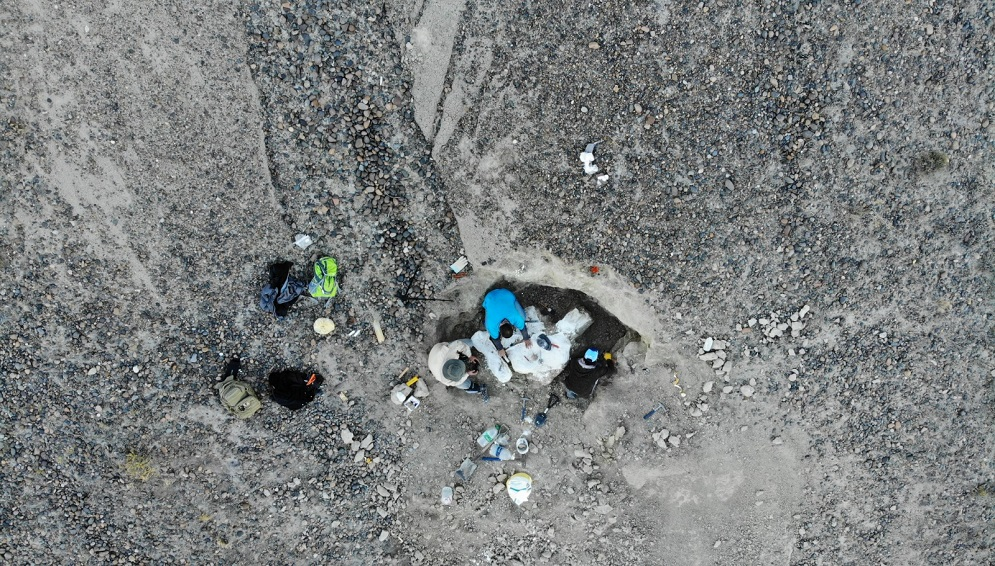
Excavation of the holotype

The Joaquinraptor holotype specimen, UNPSJB-PV 1112, was discovered and collected from outcrops of the Lago Colhué Huapi Formation during a series of field expeditions from 2019 to 2023 near the headwaters of the Chico River in Chubut Province, Argentina. It is accessioned at the National University of Patagonia San Juan Bosco. The specimen includes several bones from many regions of the body, including the skull, spinal column, arms, and legs, making it one of the most complete megaraptoran skeletons known. The disarticulated and incomplete skull comprises the skull roof and braincase, the right maxilla, quadrate, and possibly the postorbital, both dentaries, and several teeth. Vertebral elements include the atlantal intercentrum (part of the first cervical, or neck, vertebra) and three caudal (tail) vertebrae. The forelimb is relatively complete, including a left humerus, ulna, and radius, and the second right manual ungual (hand claw), in addition to the left scapulocoracoid. Hindlimb bones include the left femur, right tibia, two toe bones, and a pedal ungual (toe claw). Multiple dorsal ribs, gastral elements, a chevron, and unidentifiable fragments were also found.

In 2025, Lucio M. Ibiricu and colleagues published a scientific paper in the academic journal Nature Communications, describing Joaquinraptor casali as a new megaraptoran genus and species based on these fossil remains. The generic name, Joaquinraptor, honors Joaquín, Ibiricu's son, which is also the informal name of the type locality ('Valle Joaquín'). This is combined with the Latin word raptor, meaning "thief". The specific name, casali, honors Gabriel Andrés Casal, the researcher who first described the Lago Colhué Huapi Formation, and his contributions to Patagonian paleontological and geological research.

== Description ==
Estimated size compared to a human

The Joaquinraptor holotype likely belonged to an animal that was more than 7 metres (23 ft) long. Based on the circumference of the femur (27.5 cm (10.8 in)), a body mass of 1,036 kilograms (2,284 lb) could be calculated. Its closest relatives within the Megaraptoridae—Aerosteon, Maip, Megaraptor, and Tratayenia—all reached or exceeded this size. In particular, Maip has been estimated at around 9.5 m (31 ft), making it the largest known member of the clade. Earlier-diverging and older Australian specimens, including Australovenator, were smaller, at around 5 m (16 ft) long and 300 kg (660 lb) in weight.

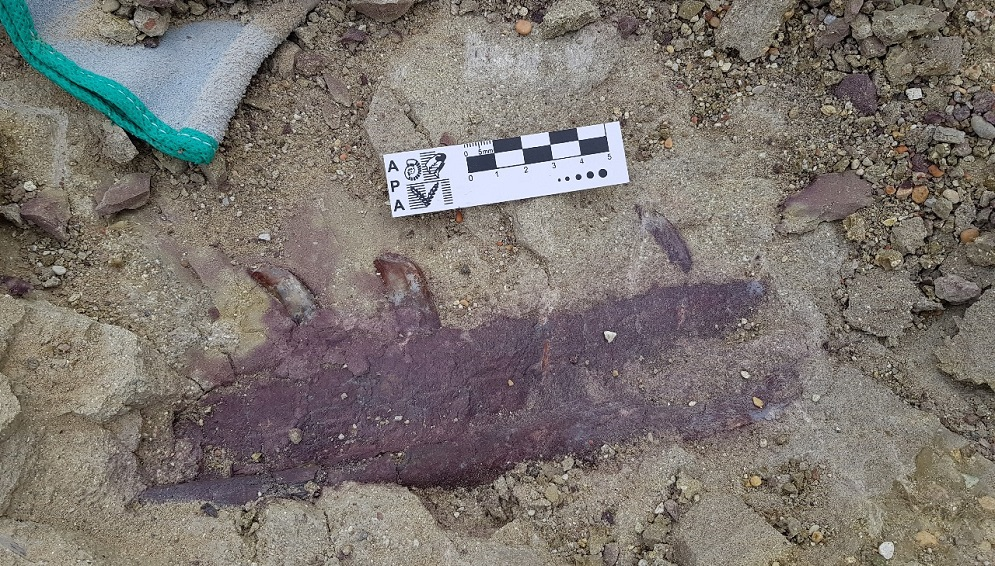
In situ mandible of Joaquinraptor

Based on the absence of observable sutures (which are an indicator of immaturity), the Joaquinraptor holotype can be identified as belonging to a sexually mature individual. However, the absence of an external fundamental system (EFS) in the bone cortex when it died implies this animal had not yet reached somatic maturity when it died. At least 19 lines of arrested growth (LAGs) were observed using an osteohistological sample of the tibia in cross-section. If these layers were deposited annually, the holotype individual would have been at least 19 years old.

=== Paleobiology ===
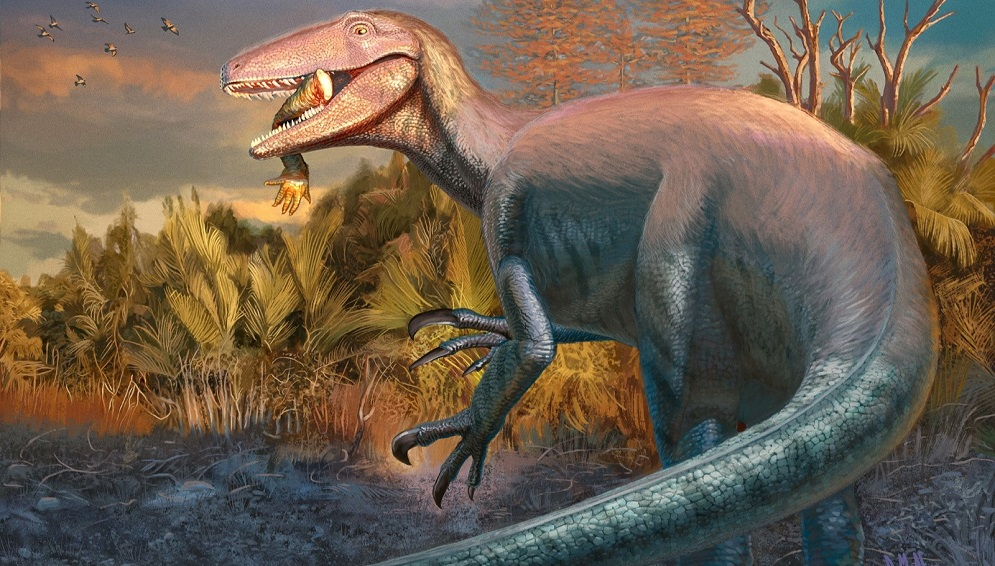
Speculative life restoration of Joaquinraptor consuming a crocodyliform forelimb

The right humerus of a crocodyliform was found in direct association with the dentaries of Joaquinraptor, contacting several tooth crowns and possibly bearing tooth marks. This may represent direct evidence of prey selection of Joaquinraptor. Alternatively, this could represent evidence of interspecific combat or competition. A third possibility, claimed to be less likely by Ibiricu and colleagues, is that the deposition of the humerus near the Joaquinraptor holotype was coincidental, carried by water currents after the Joaquinraptor had already died. However, this would imply a fairly high-energy environment capable of transporting other bones from the area, which is at odds with the discovery of the Joaquinraptor material in partial articulation, meaning it was more likely deposited in an area of low water flow.

== Classification ==
In their phylogenetic analyses, Ibiricu and colleagues (2025) recovered Joaquinraptor as a deeply-nested member of the megaraptoran clade Megaraptoridae, as the sister taxon to a clade comprising Megaraptor, Tratayenia, Maip, and Aerosteon. Their analysis recovered megaraptorans as part of the theropod clade Coelurosauria, as the sister group to the Tyrannosauroidea. These results are displayed in the cladogram below (strict consensus of most parsimonious trees, after pruning Aoniraptor):

- - Tyrannosauroidea
  - Megaraptora
    - Phuwiangvenator
    - - Vayuraptor
      - Fukuiraptor
      - Megaraptoridae
        - LRF 100–106
        - - Australovenator
          - - Orkoraptor
            - - - UNPSJB-PV-944 & 958
                - Murusraptor
              - - Joaquinraptor
                - - Megaraptor
                  - - Aerosteon
                    - Maip
                    - Tratayenia
