= Tratayenia =

Tratayenia Temporal range: Late Cretaceous, Santonian
- Reconstructed skeleton

Scientific classification
- Kingdom: Animalia
- Phylum: Chordata
- Class: Reptilia
- Clade: Dinosauria
- Clade: Saurischia
- Clade: Theropoda
- Clade: †Megaraptora
- Family: †Megaraptoridae
- Genus: †Tratayenia; Porfiri et al., 2018

Type species
- †Tratayenia rosalesi Porfiri et al., 2018

Extinct genus of theropod dinosaur

Tratayenia is an extinct genus of megaraptoran theropod dinosaur known from the Late Cretaceous (Santonian age) Bajo de la Carpa Formation of Argentina. The genus contains a single species, Tratayenia rosalesi, known from a partial skeleton described in March 2018. Tratayenia can be distinguished from other megaraptorans on the basis of three autapomorphies (unique derived features) of the front portion of each dorsal vertebra, as well as a single autapomorphy of the sacrum. Tratayenia is one of the youngest known genera of megaraptorans, having lived only about 83 million years ago.

== Discovery and naming ==
The holotype consists of a well-preserved partial skeleton, MUCPv 1162, which includes several articulated portions of the backbone. One portion of the skeleton is a string of five dorsal vertebrae, likely the seventh to eleventh dorsals. The largest articulated portion of the skeleton is a string of vertebrae including the last two dorsals as well as the five sacrals and much of the right ilium. Other preserved bones include two partial dorsal ribs and fragments of the pubis and ischium.

This skeleton was first discovered in 2006 at a Bajo de la Carpa Formation fossil site by Universidad Nacional del Comahue technician Diego Rosales. Shortly thereafter it was excavated by UNC paleontologist Juan D. Porfifi. Porfiri and his colleagues published a preliminary report on the new dinosaur in a 2008 abstract, and suggested that it may have been a relative of Carcharodontosauridae. In 2018, the new taxon was described with the generic name Tratayenia, named after Tratayén, the fossil site at which it was excavated. The specific name Tratayenia rosalesi honors Diego Rosales.

== Description ==
Size compared to a human

Tratayenia was a medium-sized megaraptoran, growing up to 8 metres (26 ft) long. It was closely related to genera such as Megaraptor, Australovenator, and Murusraptor. Like most other megaraptorans, it probably had large claws on its hands for use in hunting prey. Analysis of the Baja de la Carpa indicates that Tratayenia may have been geologically one of the youngest megaraptorans yet discovered. Tratayenia is also the largest-bodied carnivorous animal named from the Bajo de la Carpa Formation, reinforcing the hypothesis that megaraptorids were apex predators in southern South America from the Turonian through the Santonian or early Campanian, following the extinction of carcharodontosaurids.

=== Dorsal vertebrae ===
The dorsal vertebrae were tall and narrow, with large pits known as pleurocoels on the side of their centra (spool-shaped main portion). These features are common in the vertebrae of large carnivorous theropods. Some of the vertebrae had fragments of bone in the pleurocoels, which were likely remnants of thin bony walls known as septa which divided the pits. Septa are also known in other megaraptorans and carcharodontosaurids. The neural arches of the vertebrae are taller and narrower in Tratayenia than in most other theropods. The tubular transverse processes (rib facets) project upwards and to the side. A large and deep excavation is located directly below each transverse process, bounded from the front and rear by thin laminae (ridges). The front edge is formed by the paradiapophyseal lamina and the rear edge is formed by the posterior centrodiapophyseal lamina. These features are also known in the megaraptoran Murusraptor.

The prezygapophyses (front vertebral joint plates) are rectangular when see from the side, with the front and lower edges converging at nearly a right angle. This is an autapomorphy (unique adaptation) of Tratayenia. A ridge known as a prezygodiapophyseal lamina connects the prezygapophyses to the transverse processes. Another autapomorphy of Tratayenia is that the prezygodiapophyseal lamina is parallel to the paradiapophyseal lamina. Other theropods either have a weakly developed (or absent) paradiapophyseal lamina, or one which is angled relative to the prezygodiapophyseal lamina. The front edge of each vertebra has a third autapomorphy, related to two pairs of laminae (four total) connecting the prezygapophyses to the neural spines. At the base of the neural spines, the two laminae comprising each pair are very close together. But as the laminae get closer to the prezygapophyses, they diverge into a shape akin to an inverted Y. There are two of these inverted Y-like structures visible from the front, for both the left and right sides of a vertebra.

The postzygapophyses (rear vertebral joint plates) are more typical in shape, and the rear edge of each vertebra has a small, blade-like hyposphene which splits into three ridges from below. The neural spines are tall and rectangular when seen from the side, and uniformly thin when seen from the front. Most are completely vertically, but one of the dorsal vertebrae preserved near the hip slightly inclines forward as in various allosauroids. Preserved rib fragments are curved and hollow. They connected to the vertebrae by means of two distinct condyles, separated by a large opening which may have been continuous with the inner cavity.

=== Sacrum and hip ===
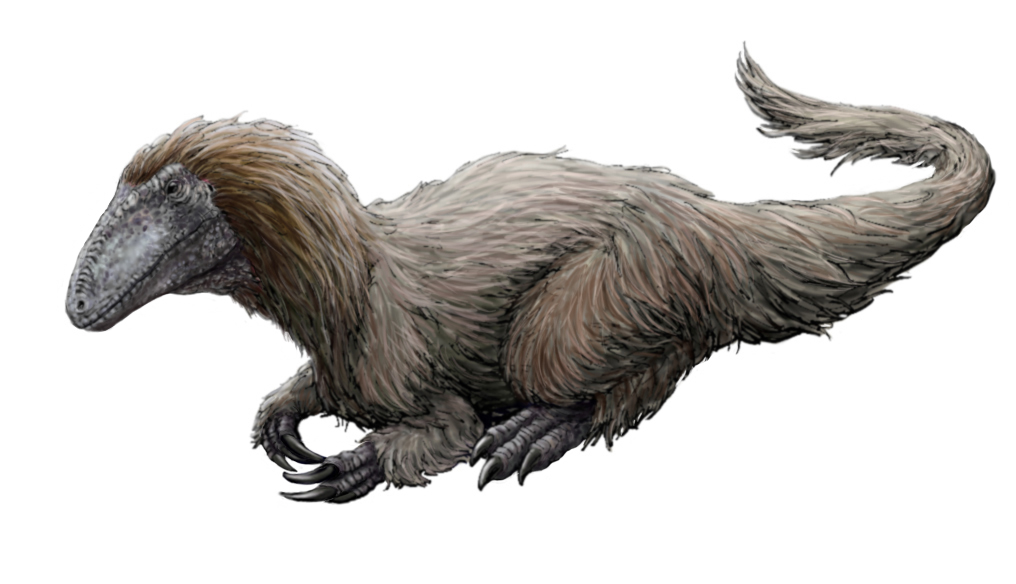
Speculative life restoration showing feathers

Tratayenia has five sacral (hip) vertebrae, as is the norm for theropods. They are very similar to the dorsal vertebrae in various aspects, such as the presence of large pleurocoels, tall and narrow centra, and laminae-bound excavations below the transverse processes. However, they only have a single autapomorphy: the anteroposterior (front-to-back) width of the neural spine increases drastically in the second to fifth sacral vertebrae compared to the first vertebra. In fact, the fifth sacral's neural spine is twice as long anteroposteriorly than that of the first. This trait has also been observed in Tyrannosaurus and an unnamed megaraptoran sacrum (SNMS 58023) from the Romualdo Member of the Santana Formation in Brazil, so its status as an autapomorphy of Tratayenia is not concrete. Some of the sacral vertebrae have neural spines which are fused together, and the last three curve backwards. The fourth sacral has a shape similar to those of the Santana Formation sacrum.

The ilium (upper blade of the hip) was heavily pneumatized, meaning that it was filled with air pockets. Pneumatization of the ilium is most common in megaraptorans among theropods, as seen in taxa such as Aerosteon and Murusraptor. The outer surface of the ilium is perforated by several pneumatic pores, similar to that of Aerosteon, but the upper edge of the bone is straight, in contrast with the curved ilium of Aerosteon. A bone identified as the pubic boot (expanded tip of the pubis) has been found in the holotype, as well as fragments of the ischium, which has the form of a long, thin shaft covered in grooves.

== Classification ==
Megaraptorans have very controversial relations to other theropods. The first mainstream hypothesis is that they are carnosaurs, distantly related to Allosaurus and more closely related to Neovenator and carcharodontosaurids. The second popular hypothesis considers them to be basal tyrannosauroids, part of the coelurosaur lineage which includes the crested proceratosaurids as well as the famous tyrannosaurids such as Tyrannosaurus. A third hypothesis also considers them to be coelurosaurs, but outside Tyrannosauroidea and basal to practically all other groups of Coelurosauria. Porfiri et al. (2018) preferred this third hypothesis. Their analysis, which expanded on that of Apesteguia et al. (2016), recovered all megaraptorids, including Tratayenia, in a large unresolved polytomy.

In their description of the contemporary megaraptorid Rinconraptor et al. tested the relationships of megaraptorans using the phylogenetic dataset of Ibiricu et al. (2025), the latest of several iterations on a megaraptoran-focused matrix. Tratayenia was recovered as the sister taxon to a clade including Aerosteon and Maip, which the researchers called "Clade B". These results are displayed in the cladogram below:

- Megaraptora
  - Phuwiangvenator yaemniyomi
  - - - Fukuiraptor kitadaniensis
      - Vayuraptor nongbualamphuensis
    - Megaraptoridae
      - LRF 100–106
        (Lightning Ridge taxon)
      - - Australovenator wintonensis
        - CLADE A
          - Orkoraptor burkei
          - - Joaquinraptor casali
            - - CLADE B
                - Tratayenia rosalesi
                - - Aerosteon riocoloradensis
                  - Maip macrothorax
              - CLADE C
                - - Murusraptor barrosaensis
                  - UNPSJB-PV 944 & 958
                    (Bajo Barreal Fm. taxon)
                - - Megaraptor namunhuaiquii
                  - Rinconraptor pipoae

== Paleoecology ==
Tratayenia is known from the Bajo de la Carpa Formation, which dates to the Santonian age of the late Cretaceous period. Its sediments represent fluvial and aeolian systems, with a semi-arid paleoenvironment. In addition to Tratayenia, several dinosaurs are known from this formation. Theropods include the fellow megaraptorid Rinconraptor, abelisauroids (Velocisaurus, Llukalkan, and Viavenator), alvarezsaurids (Achillesaurus and Alvarezsaurus), the unenlagiine paravian Diuqin, and the avialans (birds, in the broad sense) Neuquenornis and Patagopteryx. Other dinosaurs include the elasmarian ornithopod Mahuidacursor and diverse titanosaurian sauropods, such as Bonitasaura, Inawentu, Overosaurus, Rinconsaurus, Traukutitan, and Yeneen. Non-dinosaurian fauna includes indeterminate pterosaurs and fossil snakes (Dinilysia), lizards (Paleochelco), turtles (Lomalatachelys), and several crocodyliforms.

== See also ==
- 2018 in paleontology
