= Vayuraptor =

Vayuraptor Temporal range: Early Cretaceous (upper Barremian), ~124.4–121.4 Ma

Scientific classification
- Kingdom: Animalia
- Phylum: Chordata
- Class: Reptilia
- Clade: Dinosauria
- Clade: Saurischia
- Clade: Theropoda
- Clade: †Megaraptora
- Genus: †Vayuraptor; Samathi et al., 2019
- Species: †V. nongbualamphuensis

Binomial name
- †Vayuraptor nongbualamphuensis Samathi et al., 2019

Genus of theropod dinosaur

Vayuraptor (meaning "wind thief") is an extinct genus of probable megaraptoran theropod dinosaur known from the Lower Cretaceous (Barremian) Sao Khua Formation of Thailand. The genus contains a single species, Vayuraptor nongbualamphuensis, known from a partial skeleton.

== Discovery ==
The holotype and referred specimens of Vayuraptor (stored in the Sirindhorn Museum under the Department of Mineral Resources) were discovered in 1988 by Paladej Srisuk at Phu Wat Site A1, Nong Bua Lamphu Province, Thailand. The generic name means "wind thief", named after the Hindu god of wind Vayu and the Latin word raptor, which means thief. This name was chosen because Vayuraptor possesses a long and gracile tibia, which suggests it was very fast and agile. The specific name is named after the province Vayuraptor was found in (Nong Bua Lamphu Province).

The holotype of Vayuraptor (SM-NB A1-2) is a left tibia with an associated astragalus and calcaneum, which are fused together, collectively referred to as an astragalocalcaneum. Referred material of Vayuraptor consist of a right coracoid (PRC-NB A1-11), part of a fibula (PRC-NB A1-4), a rib from an unknown part of the skeleton (PRC-NB A1-10), probably part of a pubis (PRC-NB A1-3), a manual phalanx (PRC-NB A2-20), and a probable pedal phalanx (PRC-NB A2-16).

== Description ==
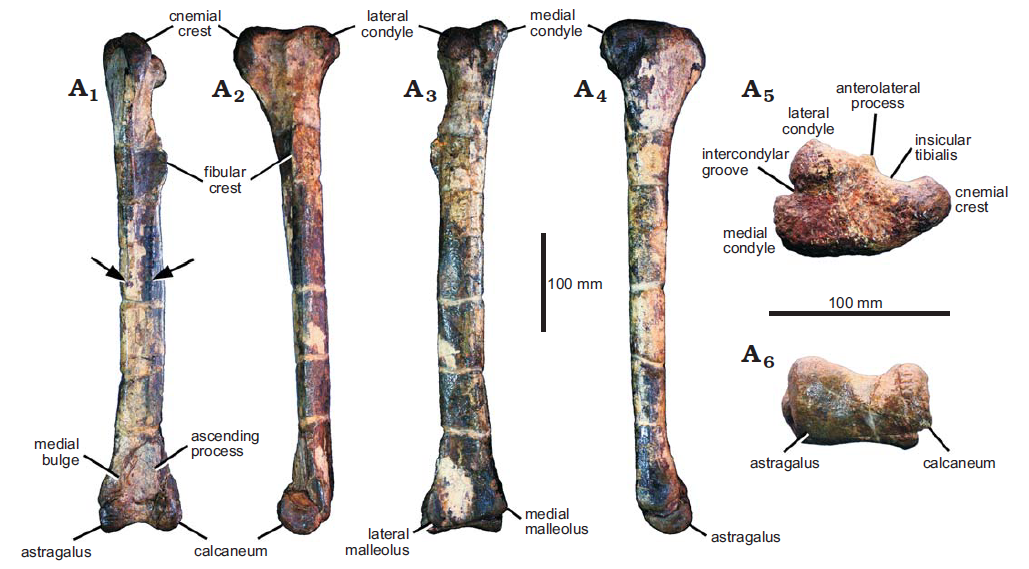
A left tibia with associated astragalocalcaneum of Vayuraptor

Vayuraptor was a mid-sized theropod, estimated at 4–4.5 metres (13–15 ft) in length. The holotype of Vayuraptor was inferred to be a mature individual, based on the fusion of its astragalus and calcaneum. As a possible megaraptoran, Vayuraptor would have had a long snout, large claws, light body, and long slender legs.

The elements that correspond to the forelimb of Vayuraptor are very fragmentary. In overall morphology, the coracoid (the bone which extends from the shoulder blade) is higher than long and is shaped like a semicircle. The posteroventral (runs from the rear to the bottom) process of the coracoid tapers from the back of the coracoid to the bottom due to breakage. The bottom of the coracoid is expanded beyond the rim of the glenoid facet. The infraglenoid groove is absent from the coracoid. The distal (farther from the body) part of a manual phalanx is preserved. It does not have distinct extensor pits on the upper surface proximal (closer to the body) to the distal articulation surface, which is a trait only found in coelurosaurs. Part of the pubis is preserved, and the morphology of the pubic shaft is generally similar to other theropods, such as Neovenator.

The left tibia is complete, long, and slender, with an expanded cnemial crest. The distal cnemial process is rounded, and the lateral condyle forms a horizontal projection. The tibial shaft is nearly straight, with a slight medial curve at its distal portion. Its mid-shaft cross-section is sub-circular, with a flattened anterior side (D-shaped), similar to Australovenator and Aerosteon. The cnemial crest does not project proximally, and the lateral condyle is small, offset from the lateral side of the proximal tibia by a posterior cleft. The fibular crest is a prominent ridge on the proximal half of the tibia, and remains distinct from the proximal articular surface. The lateral malleolus at the distal end extends further than the medial malleolus and is overlapped by the calcaneum.

The left astragalus and calcaneum are well preserved, with the ascending process of the astragalus missing its tip, but it can be discerned that it is sheet-like in morphology. The distal surface of the astragalus is concave, and in distal view, its trapezoidal outline is similar to that of Australovenator and other megaraptorans. The ascending process is 1.7 times the height of the astragalus body, matching that of Fukuiraptor. Both the astragalus and calcaneum are unfused, and the calcaneum has a well-developed facet for the tibia.

== Classification ==
In their 2026 description of the megaraptorid Rinconraptor, Méndez et al. recovered Vayuraptor as one of the earliest-diverging megaraptorans, as the sister taxon of Fukuiraptor. These results are displayed in the cladogram below:

- Megaraptora
  - Phuwiangvenator yaemniyomi
  - - - Fukuiraptor kitadaniensis
      - Vayuraptor nongbualamphuensis
    - Megaraptoridae
      - LRF 100–106
        (Lightning Ridge taxon)
      - - Australovenator wintonensis
        - CLADE A
          - Orkoraptor burkei
          - - Joaquinraptor casali
            - - CLADE B
                - Tratayenia rosalesi
                - - Aerosteon riocoloradensis
                  - Maip macrothorax
              - CLADE C
                - - Murusraptor barrosaensis
                  - UNPSJB-PV 944 & 958
                    (Bajo Barreal Fm. taxon)
                - - Megaraptor namunhuaiquii
                  - Rinconraptor pipoae

== Paleoenvironment ==
With the first fossils of the genus being discovered in the Sao Khua Formation, Vayuraptor possibly shared its habitat with the dinosaurs Phuwiangvenator (which was also named in the same paper as Vayuraptor), Kinnareemimus, Siamosaurus, Siamotyrannus and Phuwiangosaurus.
