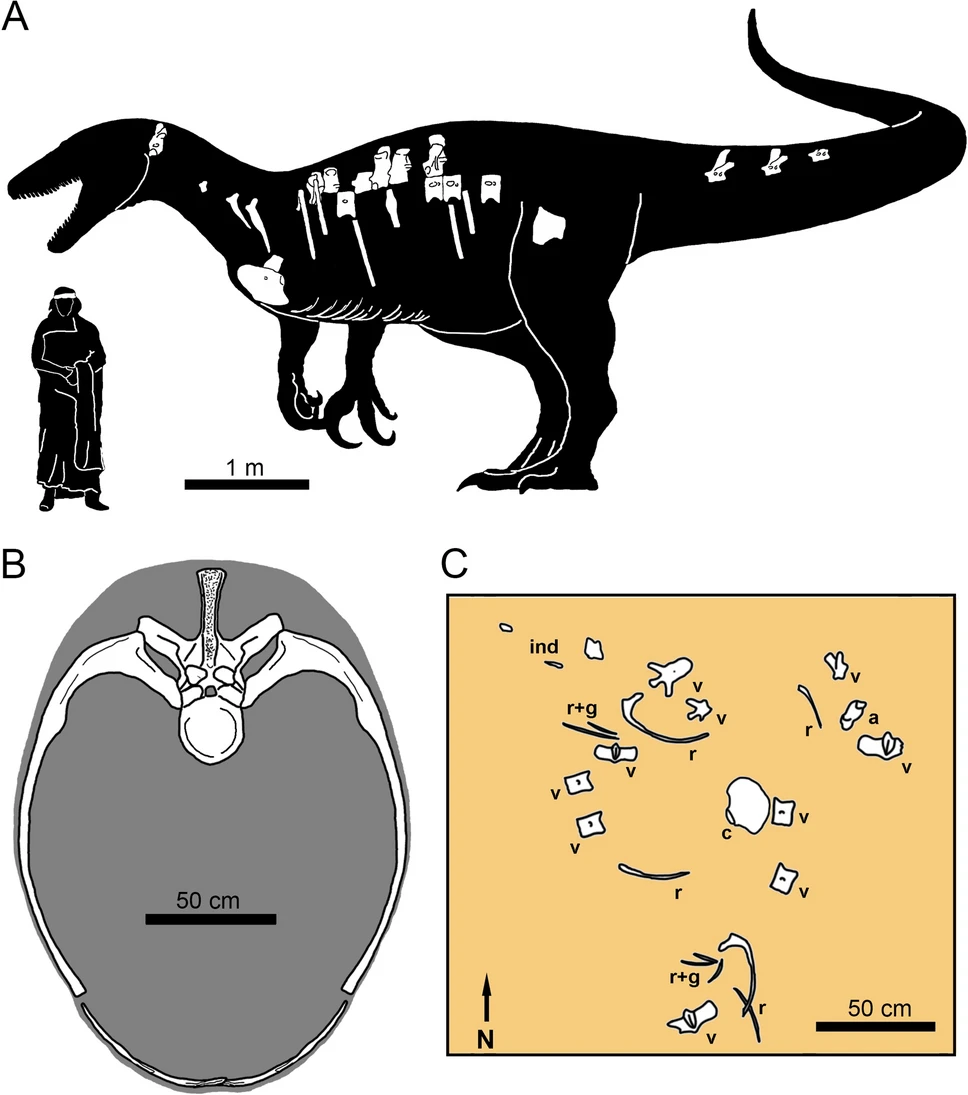
- Known material (A), reconstruction of the thoracic cavity at level of sixth dorsal vertebra (B), and interpretative drawing of the excavation (C)

Scientific classification
- Kingdom: Animalia
- Phylum: Chordata
- Class: Reptilia
- Clade: Dinosauria
- Clade: Saurischia
- Clade: Theropoda
- Clade: †Megaraptora
- Family: †Megaraptoridae
- Genus: †Maip; Aranciaga Rolando et al., 2022
- Species: †M. macrothorax

Binomial name
- †Maip macrothorax Aranciaga Rolando et al., 2022

= Maip =

Maip Temporal range: Late Cretaceous, early? Maastrichtian

Genus of megaraptoran dinosaurs

Maip is a genus of large megaraptorid theropod dinosaur from the Late Cretaceous (Maastrichtian) Chorrillo Formation of Santa Cruz, Argentina. The genus contains a single species, M. macrothorax, known from an incomplete, disarticulated skeleton. Maip may represent the largest megaraptorid known from South America, and possibly the world.

== Discovery and naming ==
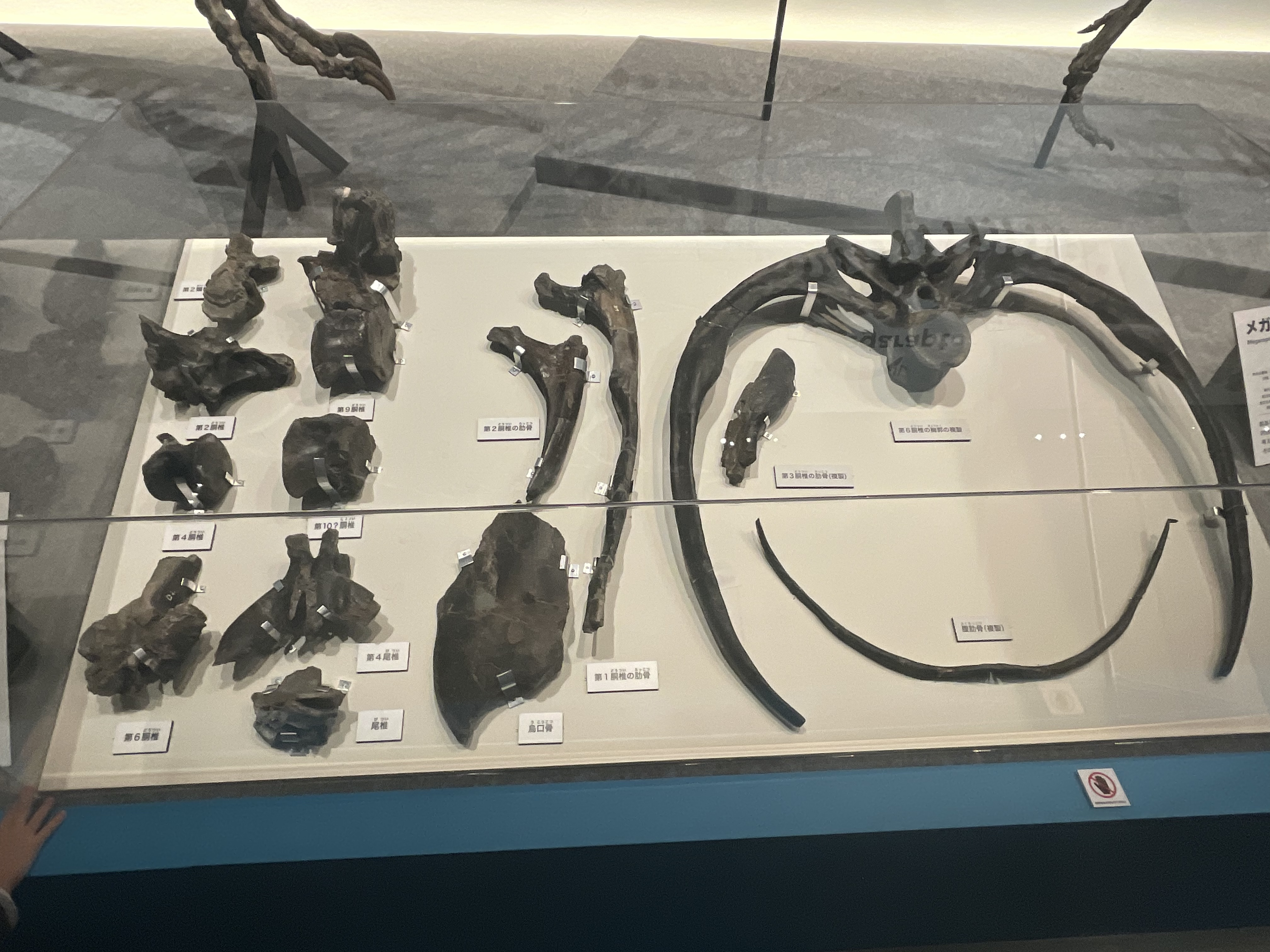
Holotype bones

The Maip holotype specimen, MPM 21545, was discovered by Alexis Rolando on the La Anita Farm, 30 kilometres (19 mi) west of El Calafate, Santa Cruz province, Argentina, in 2019. The specimen was found disarticulated but in association over an area of 5 by 3 square metres (54 ft^{2} × 32 ft^{2}). The known fossil material consists of the axis, several dorsal and caudal vertebrae, cervical and dorsal ribs, gastralia, a left coracoid, fragmentary scapula, partial right pubis, and partial metatarsal. Some of these bones were described in 2019 by Novas et al. The holotype specimen includes some bones previously unknown in other megaraptorids. Although fragmentary, it represents one of the most complete megaraptorid skeletons known.

Maip was first announced in a Research Square preprint in 2021. However, since the paper did not meet the necessary requirements, the taxon was considered informally named. In 2022, the fossil material was validly described as belonging to a new genus and species of megaraptorid by Aranciaga Rolando et al. The generic name, "Maip", references a malicious being in Aonikenk mythology that is "the shadow of death" that "kills with cold wind." The specific name, "macrothorax", is derived from the Greek "makrós", meaning "large", and the Latin "thorax", meaning "chest", in reference to its large thoracic cavity.

== Description ==
Size compared to a human

Maip is the largest known megaraptorid, estimated to have been around 9 metres (30 ft) long and weighed over 1.3 metric tons (1.4 short tons). Members of the Megaraptoridae as a whole increased in body length following the extinction of the carcharodontosaurids in the Southern Hemisphere in the early Late Cretaceous. It is hypothesized that the absence of these large apex predators allowed other theropods to diversify and fill the empty niche space. Megaraptorids, in addition to abelisaurids and unenlagiids, then became the primary predators in their ecosystems. An analysis of known megaraptorans shows that members of the clade in Asia, South America, and Australia ranged from 4–4.5 metres (13–15 ft) long during the Barremian-Aptian, after which Aptian-early Turonian forms increased to 4.5–6 metres (15–20 ft) in Australia and South America. Turonian-Coniacian megaraptorids, only known from South America, were larger, at 6–7 metres (20–23 ft) long, and the final Santonian-Maastrichtian forms were larger still, at 7–10 metres (23–33 ft).

Traces on the preserved ribs were interpreted by the describing authors as being attachment points for ligaments. From these, it was inferred that Maip would have likely had a respiratory system comparable to those of modern birds, rather than those of other extant reptiles, such as crocodilians.

== Classification ==
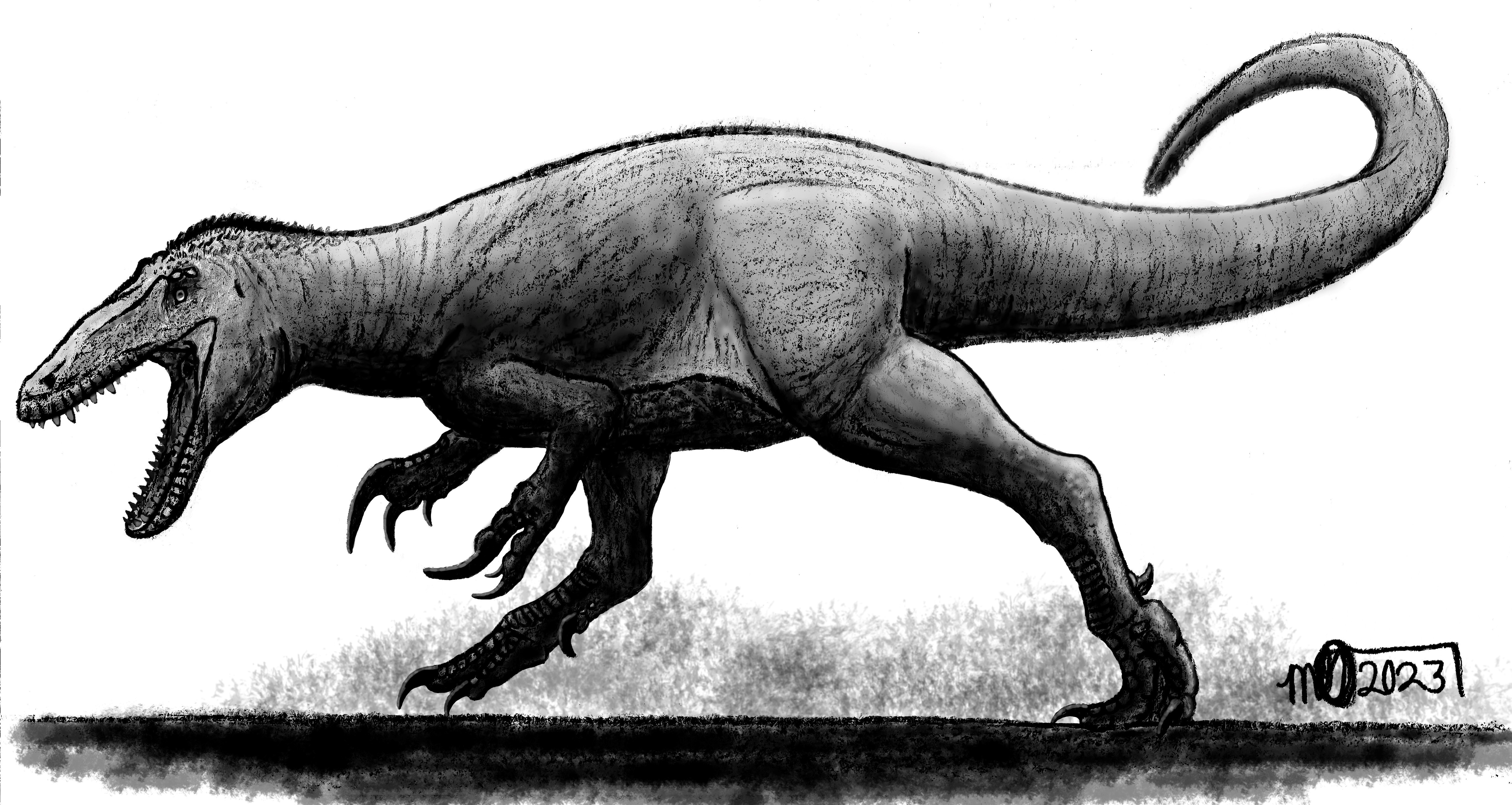
Life restoration

In their phylogenetic analyses, Aranciaga Rolando et al. (2022) recovered Maip as a derived megaraptorid in a polytomy with other Argentinian megaraptorids. They also noted the presence of two distinct clades: a more inclusive clade, comprising all megaraptorids except Fukuiraptor and Australovenator, (shown below as "Clade A"), and a more exclusive clade of larger, entirely South American megaraptorids (shown below as "Clade B"). Like some previous analyses by other authors, Megaraptora is nested within Coelurosauria, as the sister taxon to Tyrannosauroidea. The cladogram below displays the megaraptoran results of the phylogenetic analyses by Aranciaga Rolando et al. (2022).

- Megaraptora
  - Phuwiangvenator
  - - Vayuraptor
    - Fukuiraptor
    - Megaraptoridae
      - Australian megaraptorid indet. (LRF 100–106)
      - - Australovenator
        - "Clade A"
          - Aoniraptor
          - - Bajo Barreal Formation megaraptorid indet. (UNPSJB-Pv 944/958)
            - - Megaraptor
              - - Murusraptor
                - "Clade B"
                  - Orkoraptor
                  - Tratayenia
                  - Maip
                  - Aerosteon

== Paleoecology ==
Dinosaurs named from the Chorrillo Formation (Maip in dark orange, center)

Maip is known from the Maastrichtian-dated Chorrillo Formation of southern Argentina. Other named dinosaurs known from the formation include Isasicursor, an elasmarian ornithopod, and Nullotitan, a titanosaurian sauropod. Indeterminate remains belonging to ankylosaurs, euiguanodontians, hadrosaurids, noasaurids, and unenlagiids have also been recovered from the formation. Fossils of indeterminate anurans, fish, mammals, mosasaurs, snakes, turtles, and gastropods are also known. Very fragmentary fossil material, including teeth and a dorsal centrum, has been classified as having megaraptorid affinities, but it is too fragmentary to be assigned to Maip or any other taxon.
