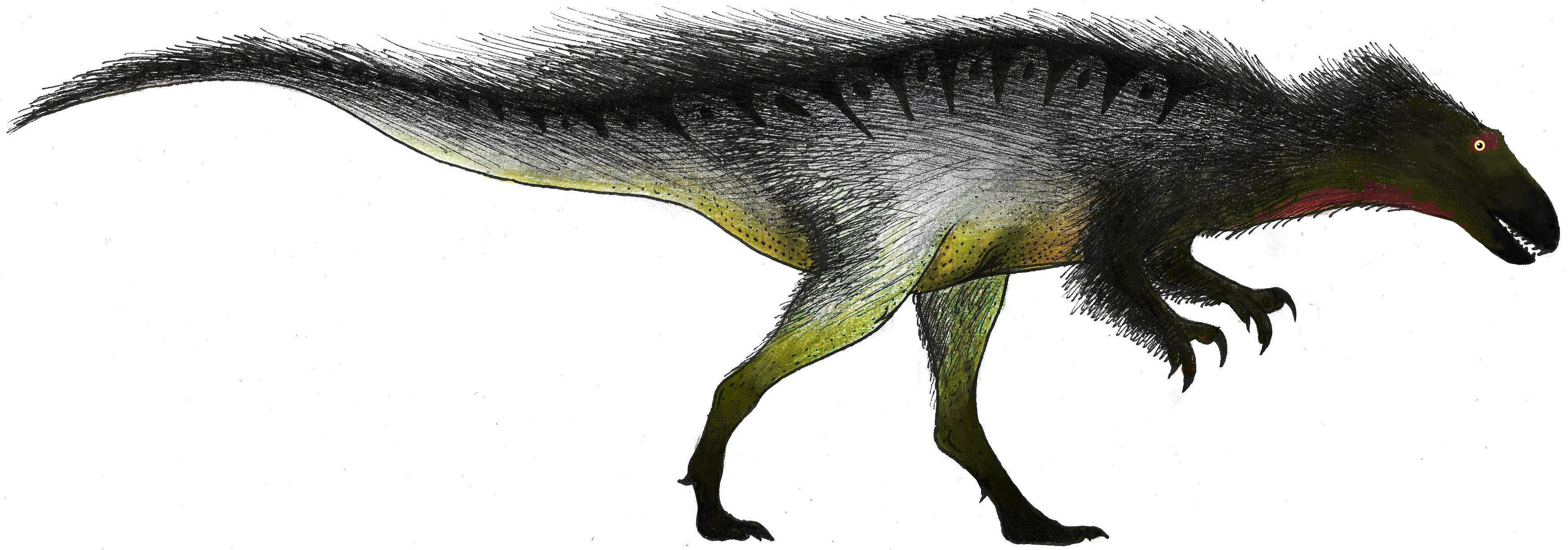
- Artist's restoration

Scientific classification
- Kingdom: Animalia
- Phylum: Chordata
- Class: Reptilia
- Clade: Dinosauria
- Clade: Saurischia
- Clade: Theropoda
- Clade: †Megaraptora
- Family: †Megaraptoridae
- Genus: †Orkoraptor; Novas, Ezcurra & Lecuona, 2008
- Species: †O. burkei

Binomial name
- †Orkoraptor burkei Novas, Ezcurra & Lecuona, 2008

= Orkoraptor =

Orkoraptor Temporal range: Late Cretaceous, 76–70 Ma

Extinct genus of theropod dinosaur

Orkoraptor is an extinct genus of megaraptoran theropod dinosaur from the late Cretaceous Period of Argentina. It is known from incomplete fossil remains including parts of the skull, teeth, tail vertebrae, and a partial tibia. The specialized teeth resemble those of some maniraptoriform theropods, namely the deinonychosaurs and compsognathids. This and other anatomical features led the authors who described it (Novas, Ezcurra, and Lecuona) to suggest that it was a maniraptoran coelurosaur. However, subsequent studies found it to be a megaraptoran. Found in the Cerro Fortaleza Formation of Southern Patagonia, it is one of the southernmost carnivorous dinosaurs known from South America.

== Etymology ==
The name Orkoraptor means "Toothed River thief", and was derived from the Aoniken "Orr-Korr", the local name for the La Leona River, located near the original fossil site. The species name honors Coleman Burke, an amateur paleontologist who supported the expedition that collected the original fossils.

== Description ==
Orkoraptor was a medium-sized theropod, measuring 8.4 m (28 ft) long and weighing 1,400 kilograms (3,100 lb). The holotype, MPM-Pv 3457 was excavated in 2001 and consists of a right postorbital, a right quadratojugal, a probable right coronoid, eight isolated teeth, the intercentrum of the atlas and its right neurapophysis, two proximal caudal vertebrae, the proximal half of the right tibia, eight fragmentary ribs, and three incomplete chevrons. It was initially believed to be a coelurosaur due to the upturned anterior process of the postorbital as well as specialized teeth which are unserrated on the mesial (front) side and have an 8-shaped cross section, similar to those of dromaeosaurids and compsognathids. However, many other features contradict those of these families and other coelurosaurs, so its original describers were unable to conclusively assign it to any specific family. They did note its similarity to a then-undescribed Patagonian theropod now known as Murusraptor. More recent analyses have explained that these coelurosaur-like traits are also present in some megaraptorans. For example, Orkoraptor's postorbital is almost identical to that of Aerosteon and the juvenile Megaraptor described in 2014 has teeth similar to those of Orkoraptor.

== Classification ==
Orkoraptor was originally classified as Maniraptora incertae sedis. While the majority of phylogenetic trees recovered in its describers' analysis recovered it as a compsognathid, the describers considered this unlikely based on its much larger size and presence in much younger strata. Orkoraptor was subsequently recovered in Megaraptora, a clade including several other enigmatic medium to large theropods, which has variously been considered to be a member of Allosauroidea and Tyrannosauroidea. The phylogenetic trees in the publication of Gualicho shinyae have found megaraptorans to be either allosauroids or basal coelurosaurs.

In their 2026 description of the megaraptorid Rinconraptor, Méndez et al. recovered Orkoraptor as one of the more basal members of the megaraptoran clade Megaraptoridae, as the sister taxon to all other "Clade A" megaraptorids (the group including all South American taxa). These results are displayed in the cladogram below:

- Megaraptora
  - Phuwiangvenator yaemniyomi
  - - - Fukuiraptor kitadaniensis
      - Vayuraptor nongbualamphuensis
    - Megaraptoridae
      - LRF 100–106
        (Lightning Ridge taxon)
      - - Australovenator wintonensis
        - CLADE A
          - Orkoraptor burkei
          - - Joaquinraptor casali
            - - CLADE B
                - Tratayenia rosalesi
                - - Aerosteon riocoloradensis
                  - Maip macrothorax
              - CLADE C
                - - Murusraptor barrosaensis
                  - UNPSJB-PV 944 & 958
                    (Bajo Barreal Fm. taxon)
                - - Megaraptor namunhuaiquii
                  - Rinconraptor pipoae

== Provenance ==
All known specimens of Orkoraptor were collected from the Pari Aike Formation, which is now considered by different authors to be either the middle section of the Mata Amarilla Formation, or merely an alternative name for the Cerro Fortaleza Formation. It was originally identified as coming from the Maastrichtian, and thus the youngest known megaraptoran, but more recently is considered to be from the Cenomanian to Santonian. The middle section of the Mata Amarilla Formation, whence Orkoraptor was collected, contains a tuff layer that has been dated to 96.2 ± 0.7 Ma, during the Cenomanian. However, the site where Orkoraptor is known from, Cerro Hornos, was recently reinterpreted as coming from the Campanian.
