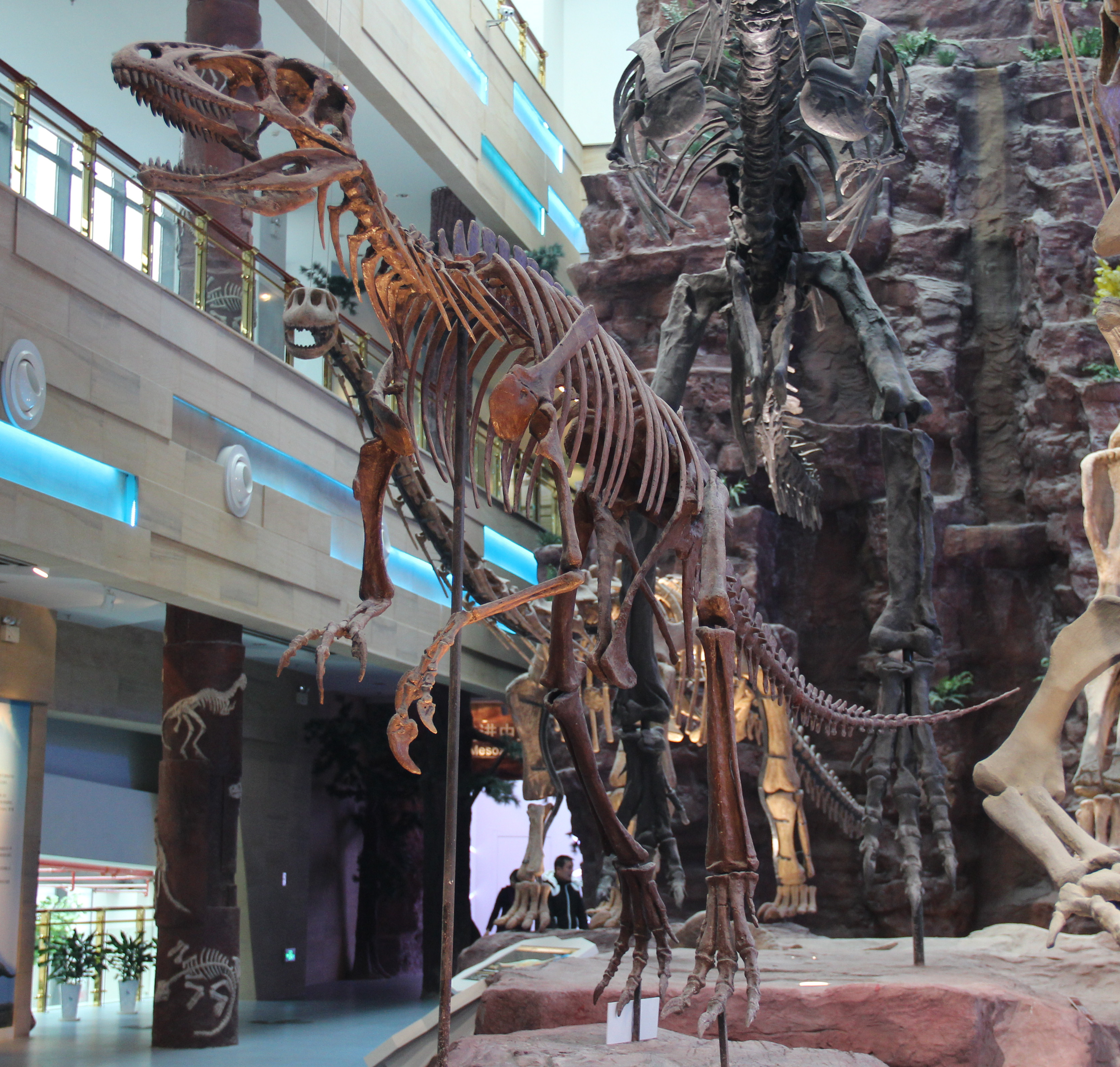
- Skeleton reconstruction of C. tashuikouensis with a speculative skull and inaccurate pronated hands

Scientific classification
- Kingdom: Animalia
- Phylum: Chordata
- Class: Reptilia
- Clade: Dinosauria
- Clade: Saurischia
- Clade: Theropoda
- Clade: Avetheropoda
- Genus: †Chilantaisaurus; Hu, 1964
- Species: †C. tashuikouensis

Binomial name
- †Chilantaisaurus tashuikouensis Hu, 1964

= Chilantaisaurus =

Chilantaisaurus Temporal range: Late Cretaceous, ?Santonian–Campanian (younger than ~92 Ma)

Theropod dinosaur genus from the Late Cretaceous period

Chilantaisaurus ("Jilantai Salt Lake lizard") is an extinct genus of large theropod dinosaur that lived in present-day China during the Late Cretaceous period. It was described by Chinese paleontologist Hu Show-Yung in 1964. The genus contains a single valid species, C. tashuikouensis, though several other species have been assigned to the genus. C. tashuikouensis is known from a single, incomplete postcranial skeleton, the holotype specimen. This specimen was found by a joint Sino-Soviet expedition to Inner Mongolia in rock layers coming from the Ulansuhai Formation. These rock layers are thought to date to the Santonian or Campanian stages of the Cretaceous period, around 85.7 to 72.2 million years ago. However, the age of the Ulansuhai Formation is debated.

Chilantaisaurus was around 11 metres (36 ft) in length and weighed 2.5–4 metric tons (2.8–4.4 short tons). This makes it among the largest known theropod genera, comparable to Tyrannosaurus. The forelimbs of Chilantaisaurus are only known from a humerus and a manual ungual (hand claw); this humerus is one of the largest humeri known from a theropod dinosaur. It measures 580 millimetres (23 in) in length and has a greatly expanded deltopectoral crest. The ratio between the humerus and femur length is very high, in contrast to those of carcharodontosaurids like Mapusaurus but comparable to those of spinosaurids like Suchomimus. The hindlimbs were long with a robust metatarsus, the largest known of any purported megaraptoran or Neovenator itself.

The classification of Chilantaisaurus has been in flux since its original description. Hu believed it was a member of Carnosauria; later studies have challenged this notion. While some studies suggested it was a member of Spinosauridae, others have proposed that Chilantaisaurus was a coelurosaur, possibly related to Megaraptora, or a carcharodontosaurian related to genera like Neovenator. The Ulansuhai Formation is dominated by red mudstone and siltstone, indicating a floodplain environment defined by meandering rivers. Other dinosaurs known from this site include the ornithomimosaur Sinornithomimus and the pachycephalosaur Sinocephale.

== Discovery and species ==
Fossils assigned to Chilantaisaurus were first discovered in 1960 by members of a Sino-Soviet expedition at the Tashuikou site, 60 kilometres (37 mi) north of Jilantai Salt Lake in the eastern Alashan Desert in Inner Mongolia, China. This expedition unearthed fossils of ornithopods, sauropods, ankylosaurs, and theropods, as well as turtles, plants, and invertebrates. The remains of Chilantaisaurus found consisted of fragmentary forelimb and hindlimb bones likely from the same individual, and were cataloged as IVPP V.2884.1 at the Institute of Vertebrate Paleontology and Paleoanthropology, Beijing. The strata of the Tashuikou site are made up of red mudstones and siltstones which belong to the Ulansuhai Formation of the Dashuigou Group. The age of the Ulansuhai Formation is not constrained with confidence, though it is definitely younger than 92 million years ago (Turonian age); Evans and colleagues (2021) suggested that the formation is likely dated to the Santonian or Campanian ages or older. On the other hand, Benson and Xing (2008) stated it dates to the Aptian or Albian ages.

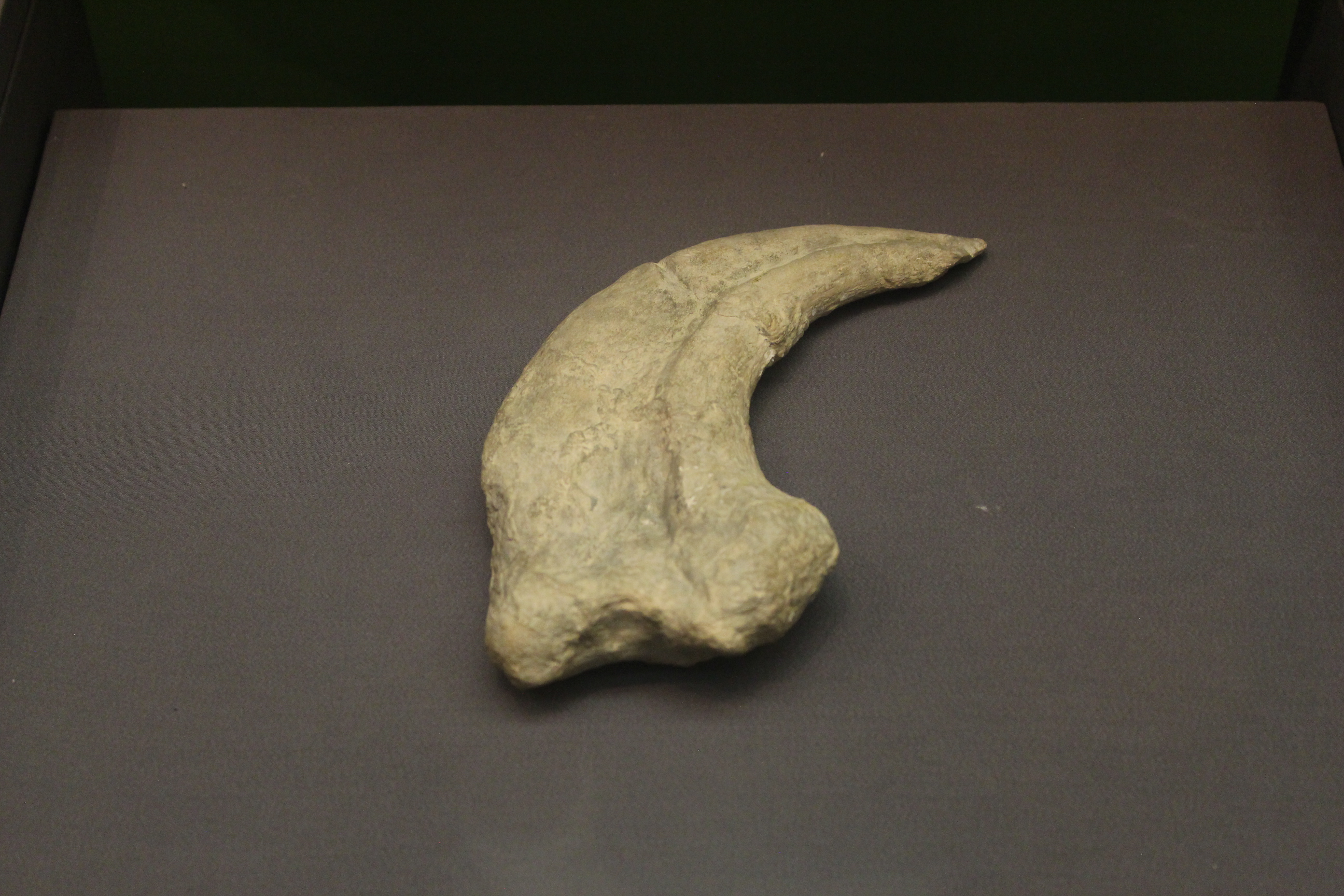
Manual ungual from the holotype in the Tianjin Natural History Museum

The material was found disarticulated and consists of a right humerus, an ungual phalanx, a fragment from the left ilium, both femora, a complete right and incomplete left tibia, an incomplete left fibula, right metatarsals II-IV, and left metatarsals III-IV. In 1964, Chinese paleontologist Hu Show-Yung scientifically described the remains and assigned them to a new genus and species of carnosaurian theropod, which they named Chilantaisaurus tashuikouensis. The generic name is a combination of Chilantai (in reference to the Salt Lake near where the fossils were found) and the Greek word sauros meaning "lizard", a common suffix for dinosaur names. The specific name tashuikouensis refers to the Tashuikou site where the fossils were found. Hu (1964) did not select a lectotype or holotype specimen, though Benson and Xing (2008) chose the right humerus as the lectotype and the rest of the material were designated as paralectotypes. In his description, Hu also assigned an isolated tooth, mid caudal vertebra, and distal (away from body) caudal vertebra to C. tashuikouensis; however none of these remains have overlap with the lectotype or paralectotypes and were not associated with those specimens, leaving their statuses in question. Benson and Xing (2008) stated the tooth is Theropoda indet., while the mid caudal belongs to Sauropoda indet. and the distal caudal is Dinosauria indet. Since its description, C. tashuikouensis' classification has been uncertain, and few studies of its remains have been published.

=== Species ===
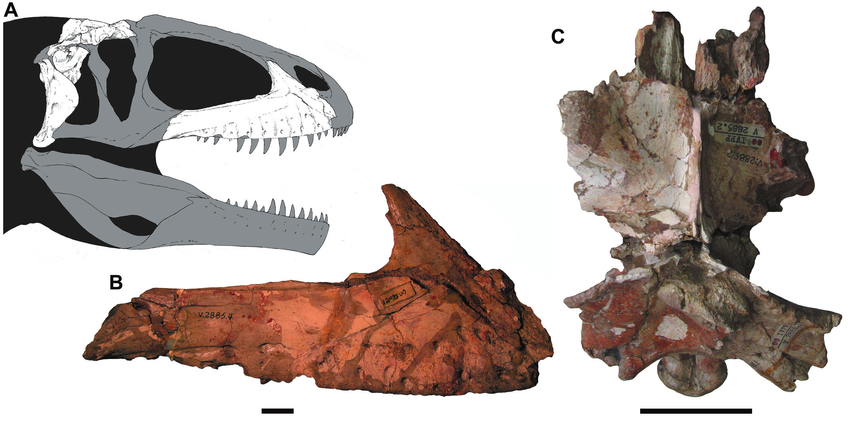
- Skull reconstruction and fossils of Shaochilong maortuensis, a species formerly assigned to Chilantaisaurus
  Chilantaisaurus maortuensis was named by Hu in 1964 in the same paper describing C. tashuikouensis. It was named on the basis of an incomplete skull, including the braincase, an incomplete axis, and six caudal vertebrae. These fossils were found at the nearby Maortu site which comes from the Miaogou Formation, which likely dates to the Aptian-Albian or Barremian-Albian ages of the Cretaceous period. It was assigned to Chilantaisaurus despite the lack of overlap between the C. maortuensis fossils and those of C. tashuikouensis. In 2000, American paleontologist Daniel Chure assigned it to its own genus, "Alashansaurus", in a thesis; however American researcher Steve Brusatte and colleagues (2009) placed it in the new genus Shaochilong, which they classified as a carcharodontosaurid. The same study noted that it was difficult to rule out the possibility that Chilantaisaurus was the same taxon as Shaochilong, which was thought to be from the same geological formation (a later study indicated that the latter genus actually derives from the Early Cretaceous Miaogou Formation) at the time. However, few phylogenetic analyses have found the two to be synonymous or even closely related and Shaochilong is regarded as distinct.
- Chilantaisaurus sibiricus is a combination of Allosaurus sibiricus made by Molnar and colleagues (1990) based on their geographic similarities and age. A. sibiricus is known from an isolated fourth metatarsal, now missing, that was unearthed from an Early Cretaceous deposit in Buryatia, Russia and was named by Russian paleontologist Anatoly Riabinin in 1914. However, it is now considered a nomen dubium and indeterminate beyond Theropoda.
- Chilantaisaurus zheziangensis was named by Chinese paleontologist Dong Zhiming in 1979 on the basis of an incomplete right tibia and complete pes that had been found in 1972 in an outcrop of the Upper Cretaceous-aged Tangshang Formation in Zhejiang Province, China. Dong believed it was a species of Chilantaisaurus based on perceived similarities in their unguals; however recent studies have concluded that it likely comes from an indeterminate therizinosaur. In a phylogenetic analysis by Hartman and colleagues (2019), it was found in polytomy with the basal therizinosaur genera Alxasaurus, Enigmosaurus, in addition to the family Therizinosauridae. Nanshiungosaurus was suggested to be a synonym of "C". zheziangensis by Kirkland and Wolfe (2001); however this has not seen widespread use in literature.

== Description ==
Skeletal diagram showing known elements of C. tashuikouensis as a megaraptoran

Chilantaisaurus was a large theropod, measuring 11 metres (36 ft) long and weighing 2.5–4 metric tons (2.8–4.4 short tons). While Brusatte and colleagues (2010) estimated that Chilantaisaurus might have weighed about 6 metric tons (6.6 short tons) based on femur length similar to that of Tyrannosaurus, Persons and colleagues (2020) argued that greater femoral circumference indicates a greater capacity to withstand greater locomotor loads, not greater body mass. Chilantaisaurus was estimated to be 11.9 metres (39 ft) long in a 2013 study by American paleontologists Lindsay E. Zanno and Peter J. Makovicky assuming that it was a megaraptoran. This indicates it was comparable in size to the other giant possible megaraptoran Siats, which was around 11.66 metres (38.3 ft) long according to the same study.

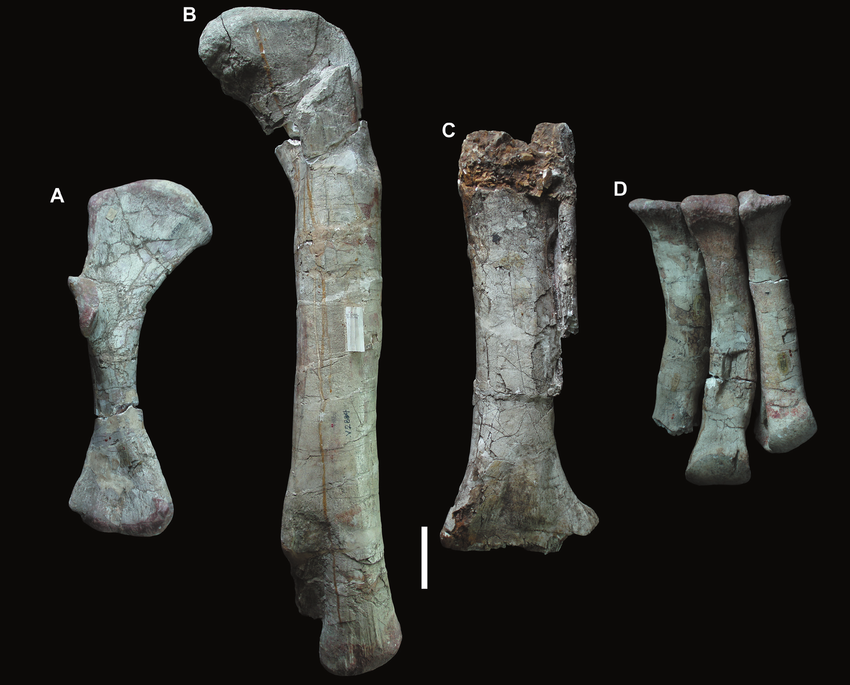
Limb elements of the holotype specimen

The humerus is massive, measuring 580 millimetres (23 in) in length, making it the largest known humerus of any non-coelurosaurian theropod. For comparison, it is about double the size of Allosaurus, a theropod which measures about 8.5 m (28 ft) in length. It is around half the length of the femur, which measures 1,190 millimetres (3.90 ft) in length. This humerus-to-femur length ratio, which is 0.49 in the genus, is comparable to the proportions of spinosaurids like Suchomimus (0.54), but much higher than that of carcharodontosaurids like Acrocanthosaurus (0.29) and Mapusaurus (0.23). However, the overall length of the humerus is shorter than that of Deinocheirus and Gigantoraptor. The humerus has a prominent deltopectoral crest which has a large, anteriorly (front) protruding flange. On the anterior surface of the crest is a crescent-shaped, pitted muscle scar that is unique to the species among theropods. On the distal (away from body) end of the humerus are expanded radial and ulnar condyles, with a well-developed process on the outer surface of the radial condyle. The manual ungual is giant, elongate, and three times as long as it is high. Spinosaurids and basal coelurosaurs like Sinosauropteryx have a similar condition. On the lateral faces of the ungual are elongate, well-defined vascular grooves that run along the length of the bone.

The ilium fragment is extremely thin relative to its size, measuring a mere 6–7 millimetres (0.24–0.28 in) in transverse diameter. In contrast, large theropods like Afrovenator, Allosaurus, Giganotosaurus, and Piatnitzkysaurus have relatively robust ilia. While the anterior end of the ilia of Tyrannosaurus, Albertosaurus, and Allosaurus bears a recurved process, Chilantaisaurus lacks this. Both of the femora are known, but have many breaks and extensive wear. The femoral head is oriented medially (towards the midline) and is angled slightly proximally (towards the body), like in other large theropods. The fourth trochanter is greatly reduced and is flanked by a small depression, unlike the prominent fourth trochanters observed in basal theropods. This condition is observed in carcharodontosaurids like Giganotosaurus; however not to the degree found in Chilantaisaurus. In total, the metatarsus is 450 millimetres (18 in) in length and an estimated 200 millimetres (7.9 in) in width, larger than in Neovenator or any megaraptoran known. The metatarsal IV is very robust, in contrast to the gracile nature of Australovenator's, and is trapezoidal in cross-section.

== Classification ==
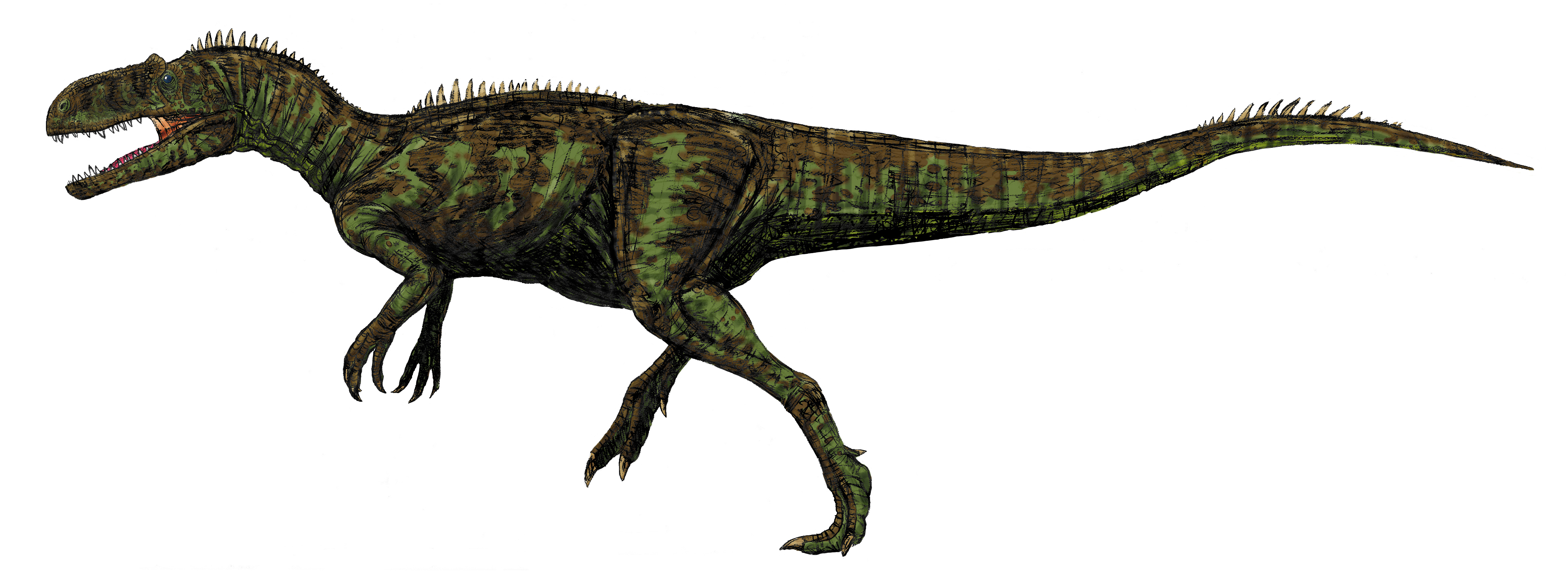
Hypothetical life restoration based on a neovenatorid interpretation

In 1964, Hu regarded Chilantaisaurus as a member of Carnosauria somewhat related to Allosaurus. At the time, Carnosauria was a wastebasket group that included all large theropods. However, in the 1980s and 1990s this term changed definition. Later, Harris (1998) placed Chilantaisaurus within Allosauroidea, possibly as a sister taxon to Carcharodontosaurus or closely related to Neovenator and Acrocanthosaurus. Several studies have classified Chilantaisaurus as a spinosaurid or spinosauroid, although Chilantaisaurus has not been classified as a spinosaurid in many studies since. In a 2003 phylogenetic analysis, German paleontologist Oliver Rauhut found Chilantaisaurus to be a basal member of Spinosauroidea or an indeterminate megalosauroid. In 2012, Allain and colleagues classified the genus in Spinosauridae because of its high humeral to femoral length ratio, straight humeral shaft in lateral view, enlarged manual ungual, and a robust longitudinal ridge near the astragalar facet, all traits similar to or found in spinosaurids. If Chilantaisaurus were a spinosaurid, it would be the youngest member of the clade and one of the few spinosaurids unearthed in Asia. Allain and colleagues' phylogenetic analysis recovered Chilantaisaurus formed a polytomy with Spinosaurus, Irritator, Ichthyovenator, and the spinosaurid subfamily Baryonychinae.

In a 2010 study, American paleontologists Roger Benson, Matthew Carrano, and Steve Brusatte found Chilantaisaurus to be a member of a monophyletic clade named Neovenatoridae, along with the group Megaraptora. Chilantaisaurus and Neovenator were basal members of the clade, while derived genera like Australovenator and Megaraptor formed the new clade Megaraptora. Neovenatorid taxa were united by several features, such as the shortness of the scapula and the pneumaticity of the ilia, though the fragmentary nature of Chilantaisaurus meant it was only tentatively placed in the clade. Benson and colleagues thought that Neovenatoridae originated in the early-mid Cretaceous and lasted until the uppermost Cretaceous, spreading to Europe, Asia, South America, and Australia. Their hypothesis was supported by the phylogenetic analyses of Carrano and colleagues (2012), Chokchaloemwong and colleagues (2019), and Zanno and Makovicky (2013); however several authors proposed an earlier origin for Neovenatoridae. Coria and Currie (2016) placed Chilantaisaurus in Neovenatoridae as well, which included Chilantaisaurus, Siats, Neovenator, and Megaraptora in polytomy based on their analysis. The cladogram below follows the 2010 analysis by Benson, Carrano, and Brusatte:

- Neovenatoridae
  - Neovenator
  - - Chilantaisaurus
    - Megaraptora
      - unnamed
        - Australovenator
        - Fukuiraptor
      - Orkoraptor?
      - - Aerosteon
        - Megaraptor

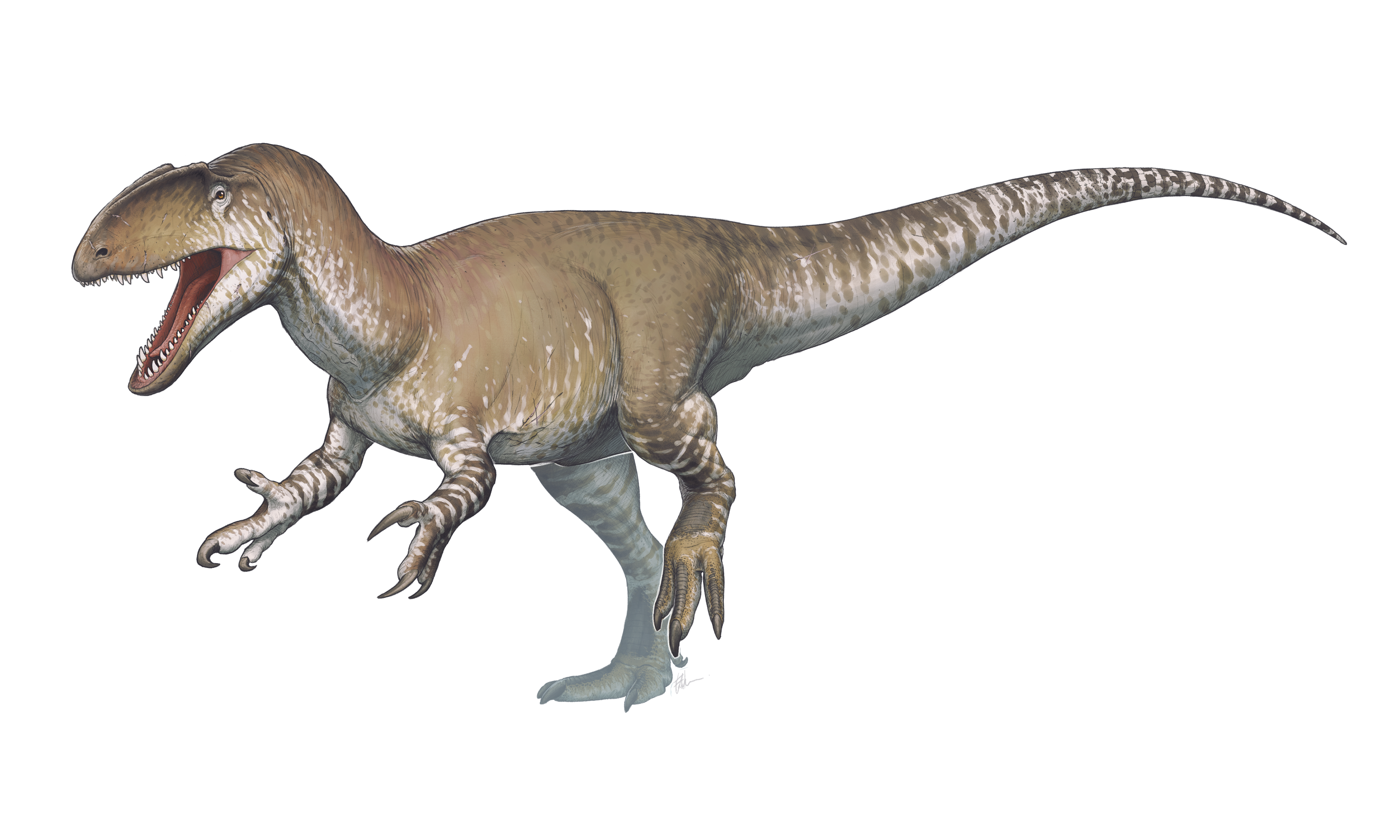
Life restoration of Neovenator, a potential relative of Chilantaisaurus

Beginning with an abstract published in 2012 by Argentine paleontologist Fernando Novas and colleagues, Megaraptora, as well as Chilantaisaurus, was proposed to be in the group Tyrannosauroidea within Coelurosauria instead of in Carcharodontosauria. Novas and colleagues (2012) argued that Benson, Carrano, and Brusatte's 2010 analysis only sampled three coelurosaurs and that many of the features stated to be exclusive to neovenatorids were observable throughout Theropoda. These arguments were formally published in a 2013 paper, which stated that Chilantaisaurus was not a member of Megaraptora or the newly erected Megaraptoridae, but instead was a tetanuran of problematic affinities. A 2019 redescription of Murusraptor by Argentine paleontologists Alexis Aranciaga Rolando, Novas and Federico Agnolín continued to find Megaraptora in a polytomy at the base of Tyrannosauroidea, based on the dataset of Apesteguía and colleagues (2016). Chilantaisaurus was recovered in a poorly resolved polytomy with genera like Concavenator, Afrovenator, and Sinraptor as well as Megalosauridae, Carcharodontosauridae, Spinosauridae, and Coelurosauria. The cladogram below follows the 2018 analysis by Aranciaga Rolando, Novas, and Agnolín:

- Allosauria
  - Allosauridae
  - Carcharodontosauria
    - Carcharodontosauridae
    - Neovenatoridae
      - Neovenator
      - Siats
      - Chilantaisaurus
      - Megaraptora
        - - Fukuiraptor
          - Australovenator
        - Megaraptoridae
          - Megaraptor
          - Murusraptor
          - Aerosteon
          - Orkoraptor

A third theory on megaraptoran classification and origins emerged starting in 2016, which purported that Megaraptora was sister to Tyrannosauroidea instead of being within the clade. In their description of Gualicho, Argentine researcher Sebastián Apesteguía and colleagues published a phylogenetic analysis using a modified dataset from Novas and colleagues (2013). Megaraptorans were far removed from the position deep within Tyrannosauroidea which the Novas and colleagues (2013) dataset had originally supported. Allosauroidea was rendered a paraphyletic grade, with carcharodontosaurids, Neovenator, a clade formed by Chilantaisaurus and Gualicho, and finally Megaraptora progressively closer to traditional coelurosaurs. A phylogenetic analysis by Argentine paleontologist Juan D. Porfiri and colleagues (2018) supported this idea and Chilantaisaurus was found in polytomy with Gualicho, Megaraptora, and Tyrannoraptora, suggesting that the taxon is a basal coelurosaur of unknown affinities. Later that year, Delcourt and Grillo published a study focusing on tyrannosauroids. They reused the analysis from Porfiri and colleagues (2018), though corrected some scores and added data from recent studies. The study placed megaraptorans as basal non-tyrannosauroid coelurosaurs close to Chilantaisaurus and Gualicho. This hypothesis was further backed by a study by Aranciaga Rolando and colleagues (2022) in their description of the giant megaraptoran Maip, in which Chilantaisaurus was classified as sister taxon to Concavenator in Carcharodontosauria whereas Neovenator was in polytomy with Eocarcharia and Carcharodontosauridae. Naish and Cau (2022) recovered Chilantaisaurus as a basal megaraptoran, with this clade diverging after Xiongguanlong, and supported Siats and Chilantaisaurus as representing a wave of gigantism in tyrannosauroids preceding the Tyrannosauridae. The cladogram below follows Naish and Cau (2022), who found Chilantaisaurus within Megaraptora, which was included in Tyrannosauroidea:

- - Yutyrannus
  - - Eotyrannus
    - - Xiongguanlong
      - - - Megaraptora
            - Siats
            - - Aniksosaurus
              - - Chilantaisaurus
                - - Fukuiraptor
                  - - Aerosteon
                    - Australovenator
                    - Megaraptor
                    - Orkoraptor
          - - Dryptosaurus
            - - Appalachiosaurus
              - - - Bistahieversor
                  - Teratophoneus
                - Tyrannosauridae
                  - Gorgosaurus
                  - - Alioramus
                    - - Lythronax
                      - Tyrannosaurus

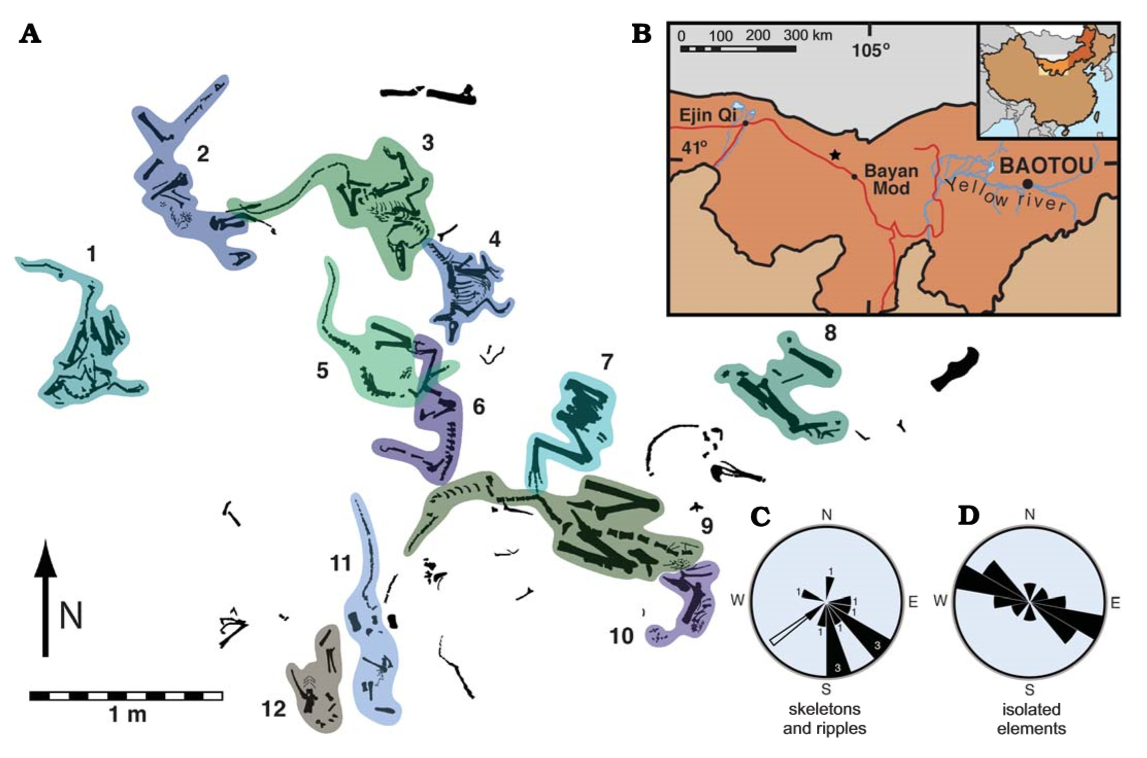
Map of the Suhongtu site, which derives from the Ulansuhai Formation

In the 2024 description of the theropod Alpkarakush, Rauhut and colleagues performed a phylogenetic analysis using their own matrix. In contrast to the idea that Chilantaisaurus is a coelurosaur, Rauhut and colleagues did not find Chilantaisaurus and Neovenator in Coelurosauria. Instead, Chilantaisaurus and Neovenator were found to be sister taxa and the basalmost carcharodontosaurians. Megaraptora was recovered as a sister group to Tyrannosauridae in the superfamily Tyrannosauroidea, similar to the results of Novas and colleagues (2013). In their 2025 analysis of allosauroid phylogenetics, Kellermann, Cuesta and Rauhut recovered Chilantaisaurus as both a basal allosauroid sister to Neovenator and as a tyrannosauroid of indeterminate affinities, similar to the results of Rauhut and colleagues (2024) but in contrast to studies like Novas and colleagues (2013) and Naish and Cau (2022).

== Paleoecology ==
The Ulansuhai Formation is dominated by red mudstone and siltstone, indicating a floodplain environment defined by meandering rivers. However, some geologic features, such as calcrete, indicate drier components of the ecosystem. The formation was deposited during a period of transition for the Gobi from wet, fluvial ecosystems towards the desertic dune-dominated ecosystems of later Cretaceous deposits. This is one of several dinosaur-bearing rock formations in Inner Mongolia, showing shifts in the Cretaceous dinosaur fauna of Asia. Other dinosaurs from the formation include the ornithomimosaur Sinornithomimus and the pachycephalosaur Sinocephale.
