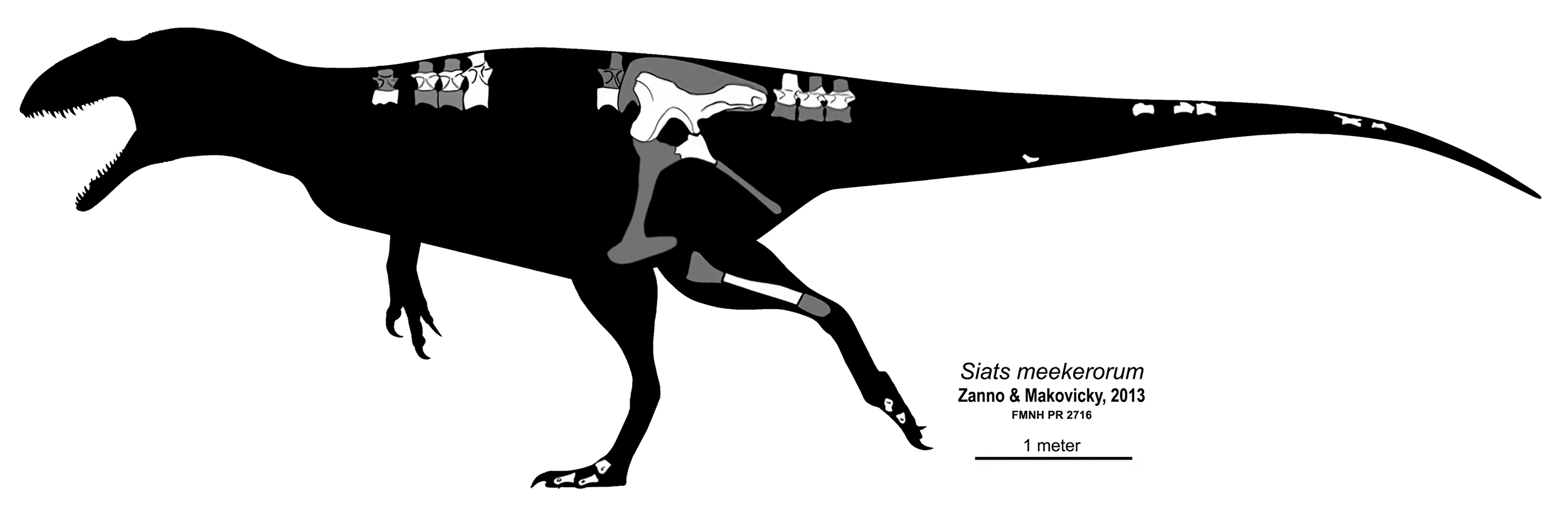
- Skeletal reconstruction of known elements

Scientific classification
- Kingdom: Animalia
- Phylum: Chordata
- Class: Reptilia
- Clade: Dinosauria
- Clade: Saurischia
- Clade: Theropoda
- Clade: Coelurosauria (?)
- Clade: †Megaraptora
- Family: †Megaraptoridae (?)
- Genus: †Siats; Zanno & Makovicky, 2013

Type species
- †Siats meekerorum Zanno & Makovicky, 2013

= Siats =

Siats Temporal range: Cenomanian, 99–94.5 Ma

Extinct genus of theropod dinosaurs

Siats (/see-ats/) is an extinct genus of large theropod dinosaurs known from the Late Cretaceous Cedar Mountain Formation (Mussentuchit Member) of Utah, United States. The genus contains a single species, Siats meekerorum. It was initially classified as a megaraptoran, a clade of large theropods with controversial relationships. Alternative positions within the Neovenatoridae, Allosauroidea, and Tyrannosauroidea have also been proposed.

== Discovery and naming ==
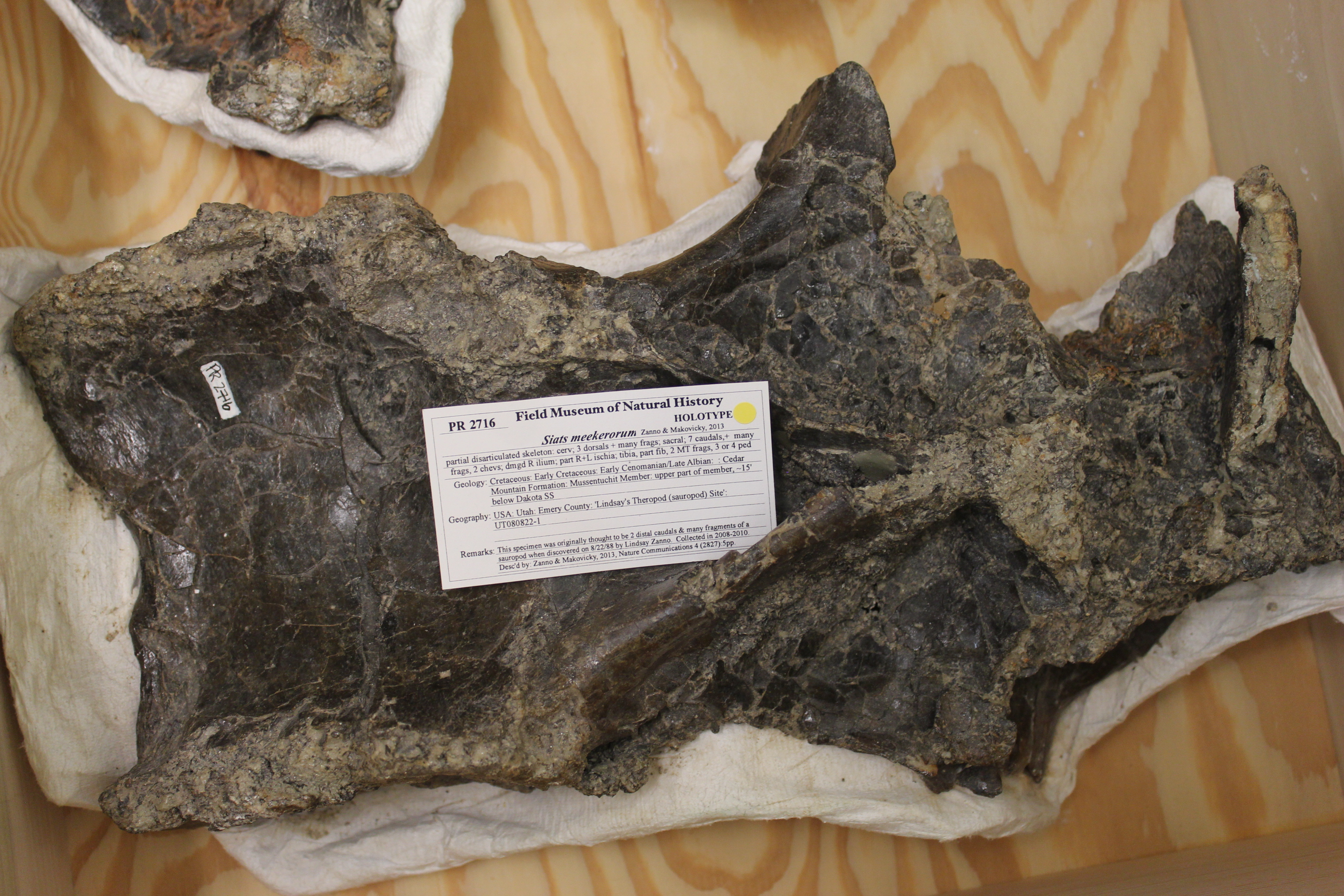
Dorsal vertebra

Siats was described by Lindsay E. Zanno and Peter J. Makovicky in 2013. The generic name references a man-eating monster in Ute mythology. The specific name meekerorum honors the geologist John Caldwell Meeker and his family for their support of paleontological research.

Siats is known from the holotype specimen, FMNH PR 2716, a partial postcranial skeleton housed at the Field Museum of Natural History, Chicago. The specimen consists of five dorsal vertebrae, eight caudal vertebrae, a chevron, a partial right ilium, ischium, fibula, tibia, and several right and left pedal phalanges. The specimen was discovered by Lindsay Zanno as a part of a 2008 Field Museum expedition with Peter Makovicky. The bones were first seen protruding out of a hillside, prompting the excavation. It was collected between 2008 and 2010 from the Mussentuchit Member of the Cedar Mountain Formation in Emery County of Utah, dating to the early Cenomanian stage of the Late Cretaceous, approximately 94.5 million years ago.

== Description ==
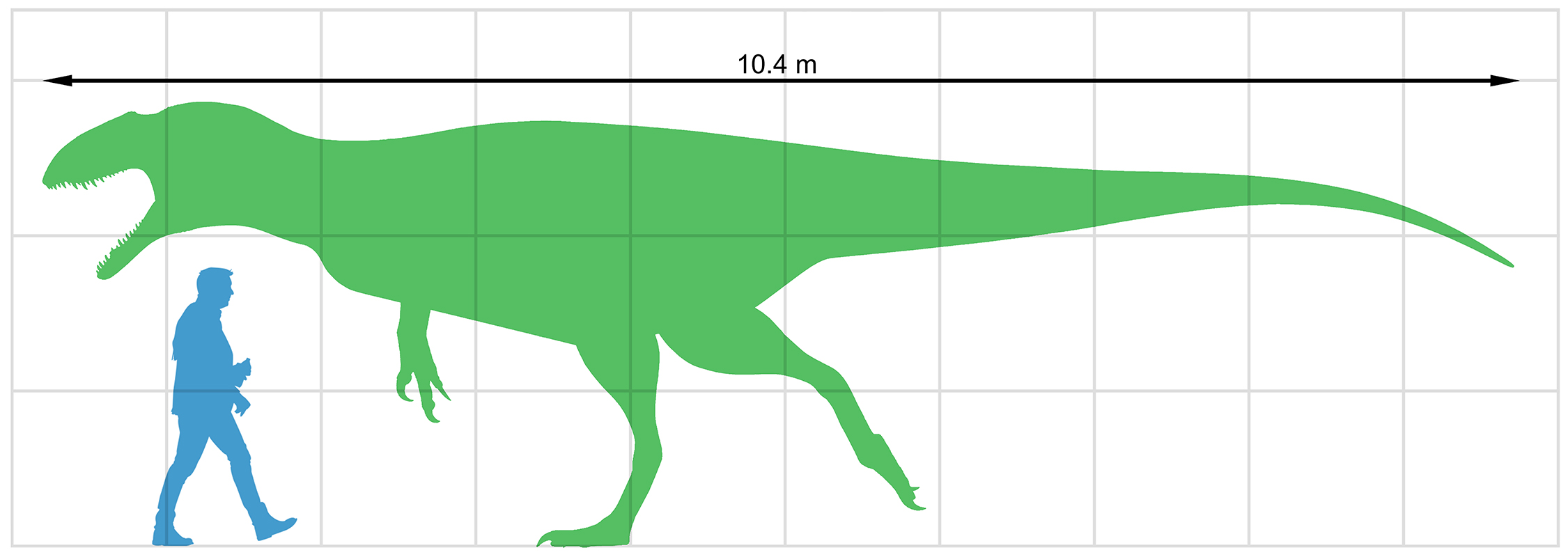
Size of Siats compared to a human

The Siats holotype specimen consists of material from a single individual that is considered skeletally immature based on the incomplete fusion of neural arches to the centra of the dorsal vertebrae. Siats is characterized by seven traits, including four autapomorphies. These include the subtriangular cross section of the distal caudal vertebrae, elongated centrodiapophyseal laminae lacking noticeable infradiapophyseal fossae on the proximal caudals, a transversely concaved acetabular rim of iliac pubic peduncle, and the presence of a notch on the end of the truncated lateral brevis shelf. Other notable traits include the broad neural spines on the dorsal vertebrae.

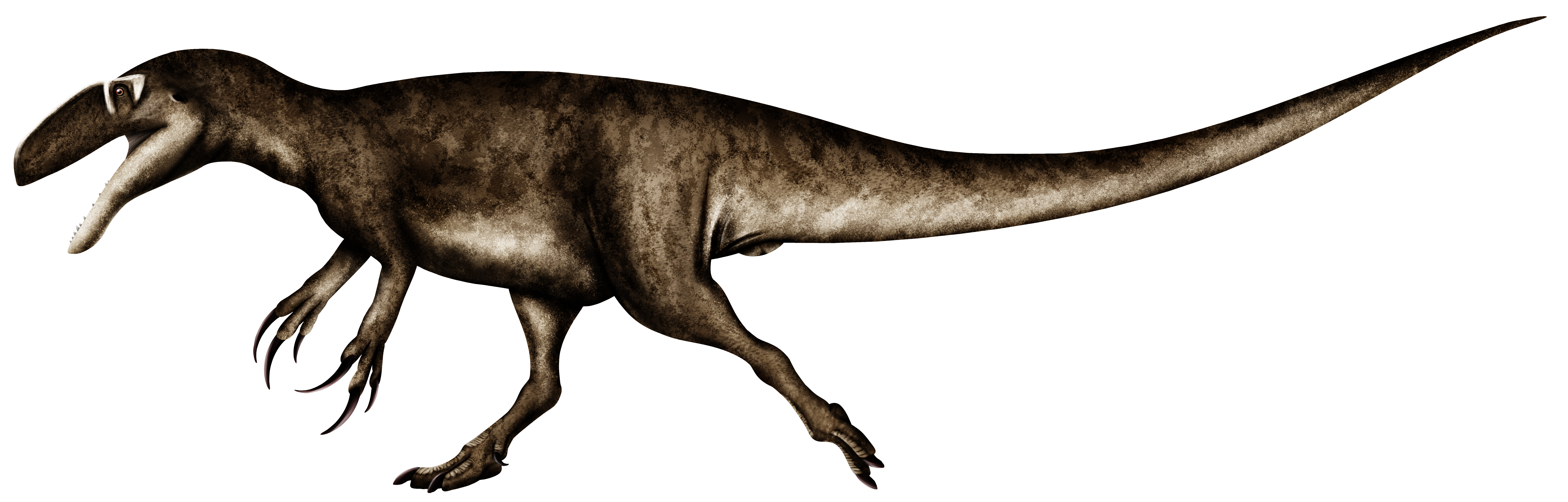
Speculative life restoration as an allosauroid

Siats represents one of the largest known theropods from the 'mid'-Cretaceous of North America. Using a femur circumference regression, Zanno and Mackovicky (2013) estimated its size at around 10 metres (33 ft) long and mass at roughly 3.9 metric tons (4.3 short tons). They further wrote that the holotype was already comparable in size to Allosaurus anax and Acrocanthosaurus despite its immaturity.

== Classification ==
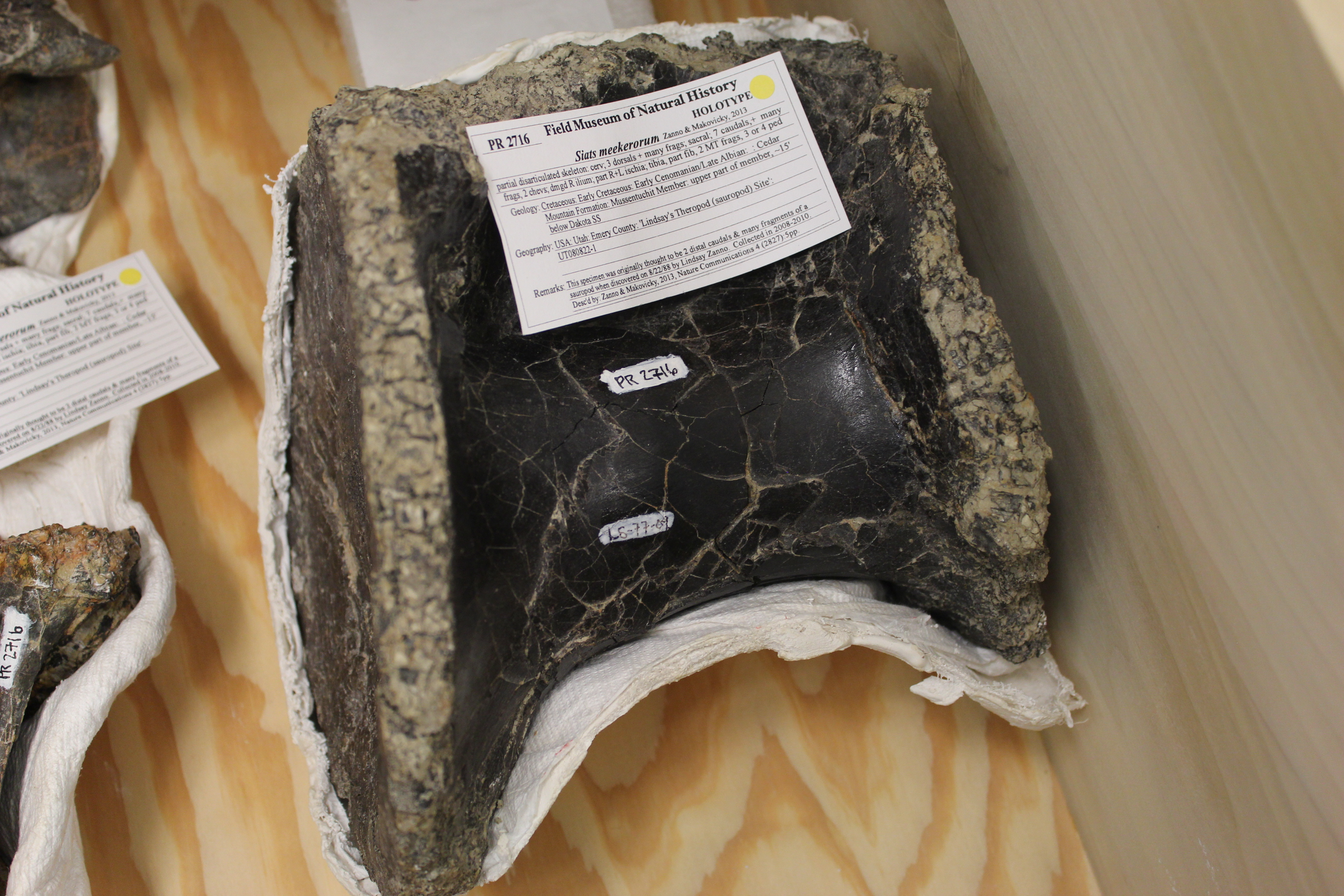
Caudal vertebral centrum

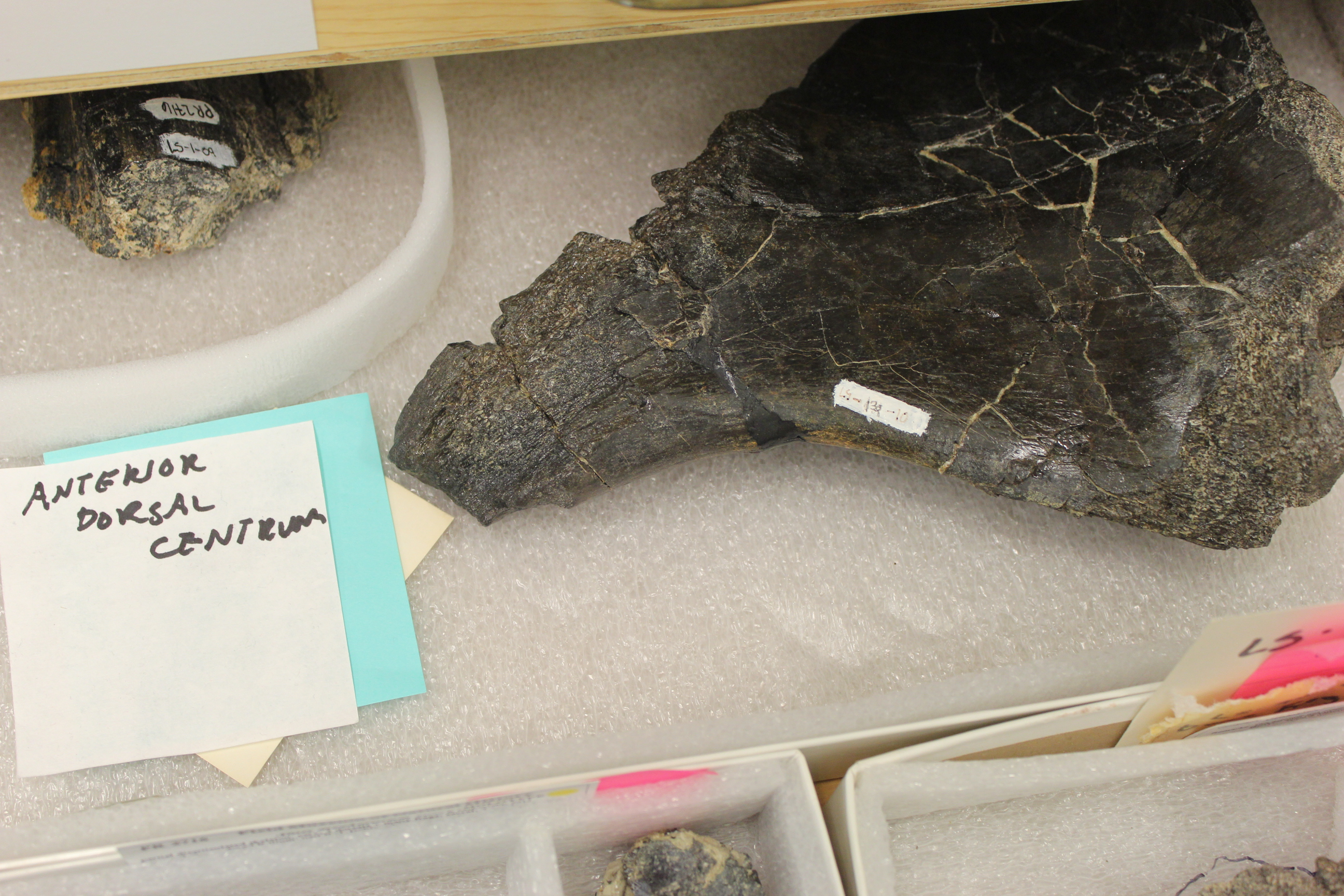
Dorsal vertebral centrum

In its 2013 description, Siats was initially classified as a megaraptoran within the Neovenatoridae, based on the presence of pronounced centrodiapophyseal laminae bracketed by deep infradiapophyseal fossa on the caudal neural arches, similar to that of the megaraptoran Aerosteon. These results, following Zanno & Makovicky (2013), are displayed in the cladogram below:

- Allosauroidea
  - Metriacanthosauridae
  - Allosauria
    - Allosauridae
      - Allosaurus fragilis
      - Saurophaganax maximus
    - Carcharodontosauria
      - Neovenatoridae
        - Neovenator salerii
        - - Chilantaisaurus tashuikouensis
          - Megaraptora
            - Siats meekerorum
            - - Australovenator wintonensis
              - Fukuiraptor kitadaniensis
            - - Aerosteon riocoloradensis
              - Megaraptor namunhuaiquii
      - Carcharodontosauridae
        - - Eocarcharia dinops
          - Concavenator corcovatus
        - - Acrocanthosaurus atokensis
          - - Shaochilong maortuensis
            - Carcharodontosaurinae

In the 2014 description of a juvenile Megaraptor specimen, the referral of Siats to Megaraptora was contested, and megaraptorans were found to more likely be tyrannosauroids rather than neovenatorids such as Siats. The paper noted that, although sharing various features with Neovenator, Siats could be distinguished from megaraptorans in the structure of its dorsal vertebrae, ilium, and fibula. A subsequent analysis conducted by Coria and Currie (2016), which even placed megaraptorans as neovenatorids, still placed Siats and Chilantaisaurus as neovenatorids outside of Megaraptora. However, Bell et al. (2016) recovered Siats as a member of Coelurosauria of uncertain phylogenetic placement within this group; their analyses found variable positions for Siats, as a relative of ornithomimosaurs, a theropod more closely related to maniraptorans than tyrannosauroids, a basal megaraptoran, or a tyrannosauroid more closely related to tyrannosaurids than Xiongguanlong.

Naish and Cau (2022) recovered the taxon as the basalmost megaraptoran, with this clade diverging after Xiongguanlong, and supported Siats and Chilantaisaurus as representing a wave of gigantism in tyrannosauroids preceding the Tyrannosauridae. In their 2025 analysis of allosauroid phylogenetics, Kellermann, Cuesta & Rauhut consistently recovered Siats as a megaraptoran, noting that it shares a specific position of pneumatic fossa with this clade. The cladogram below follows Naish and Cau (2022), who found Siats within Megaraptora as part of Tyrannosauroidea:

- - Yutyrannus
  - - Eotyrannus
    - - Xiongguanlong
      - - - Megaraptora
            - Siats
            - - Aniksosaurus
              - - Chilantaisaurus
                - - Fukuiraptor
                  - - Aerosteon
                    - Australovenator
                    - Megaraptor
                    - Orkoraptor
          - - Dryptosaurus
            - - Appalachiosaurus
              - - - Bistahieversor
                  - Teratophoneus
                - Tyrannosauridae
                  - Gorgosaurus
                  - - Alioramus
                    - - Lythronax
                      - Tyrannosaurus
