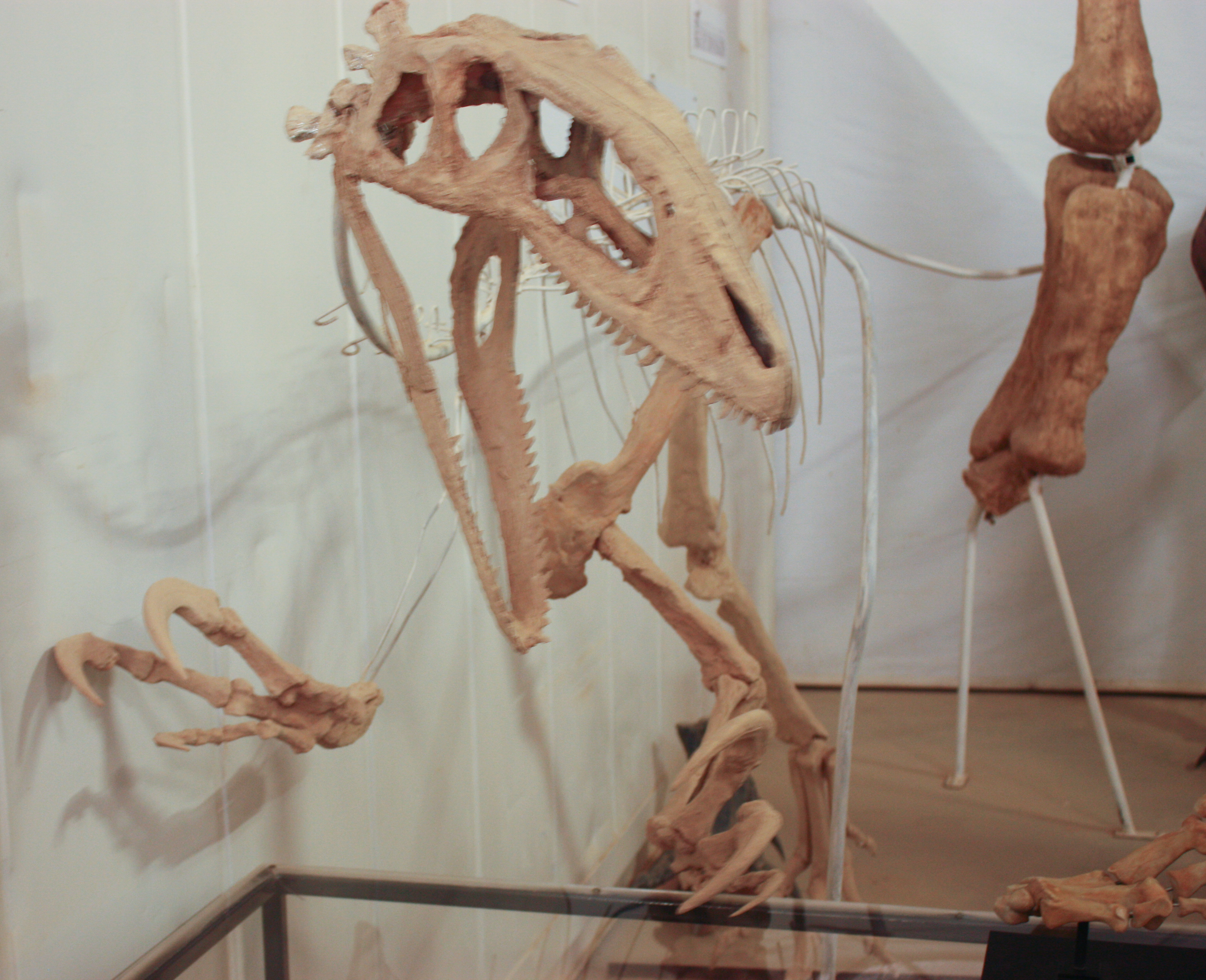
- Reconstructed skeleton, Australian Age of Dinosaurs Museum, Winton, Australia

Scientific classification
- Kingdom: Animalia
- Phylum: Chordata
- Class: Reptilia
- Clade: Dinosauria
- Clade: Saurischia
- Clade: Theropoda
- Clade: †Megaraptora
- Family: †Megaraptoridae
- Genus: †Australovenator; Hocknull et al. 2009
- Species: †A. wintonensis

Binomial name
- †Australovenator wintonensis Hocknull et al. 2009

= Australovenator =

Australovenator Temporal range: Late Cretaceous, 95 Ma Possible Albian record

Extinct genus of dinosaurs

Australovenator (meaning "southern hunter") is a genus of Late Cretaceous megaraptoran theropod dinosaur from the Winton Formation of Queensland, Australia. The holotype (name-bearing) specimen consists of a partial skeleton that was discovered near Elderslie Station in 2006. Its remains, including elements of the forelimbs, hindlimbs, pelvis, and lower jaws, were found intermingled with those of the sauropod dinosaur Diamantinasaurus. These rock layers derive from the Cenomanian stage of the Cretaceous period, about 95 million years ago. Australovenator was described by Australian paleontologist Scott Hocknull and colleagues in 2009. The genus contains a single species, A. wintonensis, though fragmentary remains from the Eumeralla and Wonthaggi Formations may have been described cf.Australovenator.

Australovenator was around 6 metres (20 ft) long and weighed 310–500 kilograms (680–1,100 lb). This makes it smaller than most South American megaraptorans, but among the largest carnivorous dinosaurs known from Australia. Although a skull is not known, it likely had an elongated, slender head like other megaraptorans. Its dentaries (lower jaws) are lightly-built and have 19 teeth each. The forelimbs are massive, with bowed, S-shaped humeri (upper arm bones) and terminate in giant, sharp claws. Its hindlimbs are relatively gracile, with a thin metatarsus in contrast to the robust metatarsi of theropods like Chilantaisaurus.

Most phylogenetic analyses recover Australovenator as a basal member of Megaraptoridae, a family of long-armed, carnivorous tetanurans that occupied Australia, South America, Asia and possibly Africa and North America during the Cretaceous period. However, the higher relationships of Megaraptora are uncertain. The Winton Formation is dominated by sandstone, indicating an oxbow lake or similar lacustrine environment. Other dinosaurs known from this site include the sauropods Diamantinasaurus and Wintonotitan, an unnamed ankylosaur, and a larger, possibly distinct, megaraptoran.

== History of discovery ==
=== Initial description ===
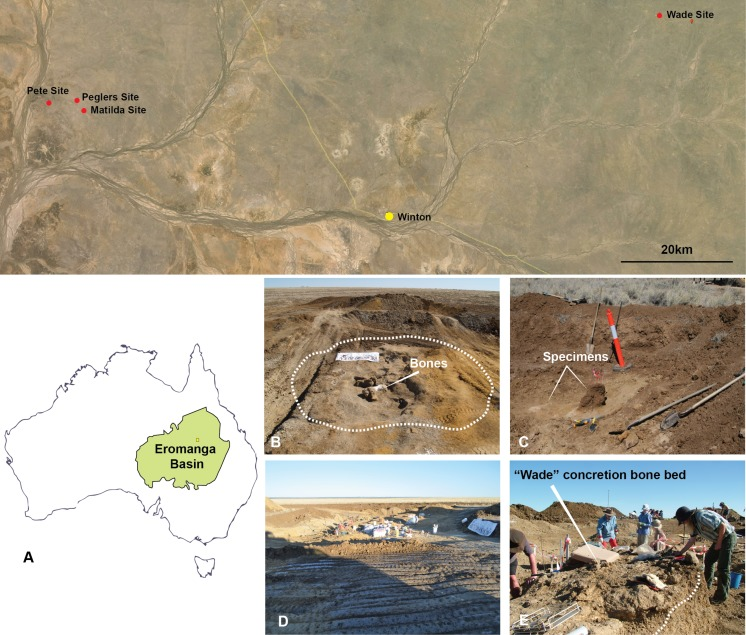
Map of the Winton Formation (A) and photos of the excavation of Australovenator fossils from the "Matilda Site".

Prior to the discovery of Australovenator, Australian theropods were only represented by taxa known from fragmentary and/or isolated material. Beginning in 2006, the Australian Age of Dinosaurs Museum of Natural History (AODF) and the Queensland Museum began a series of expeditions in the "Matilda Site" at Elderslie Station. Fossils at the Station were first identified by the owners of property, with the first discovery being sauropod bone fragments. This locale is located 60 kilometres (37 mi) north-west of Winton, central Queensland, Australia. In 2006, an incomplete skeleton of a large theropod dinosaur was discovered at the "Matilda Site" in a layer of the Winton Formation, which dates to the Cenomanian stage of the Late Cretaceous period, around 95 million years ago. Strata containing the theropod fossils was made up of black soils that lacked recognizable facies and plant fossil-rich claystones, though all are known to derive from the Winton Formation. This skeleton was found intermingled with the remains of a sauropod, later named Diamantinasaurus matildae. After an initial three years of excavation from 2006 to 2009, the theropod skeleton was deposited at the AODF under specimen number AODF 604. Due to the material being encased in a phosphatic concretion, many fossils remained unidentified for years.

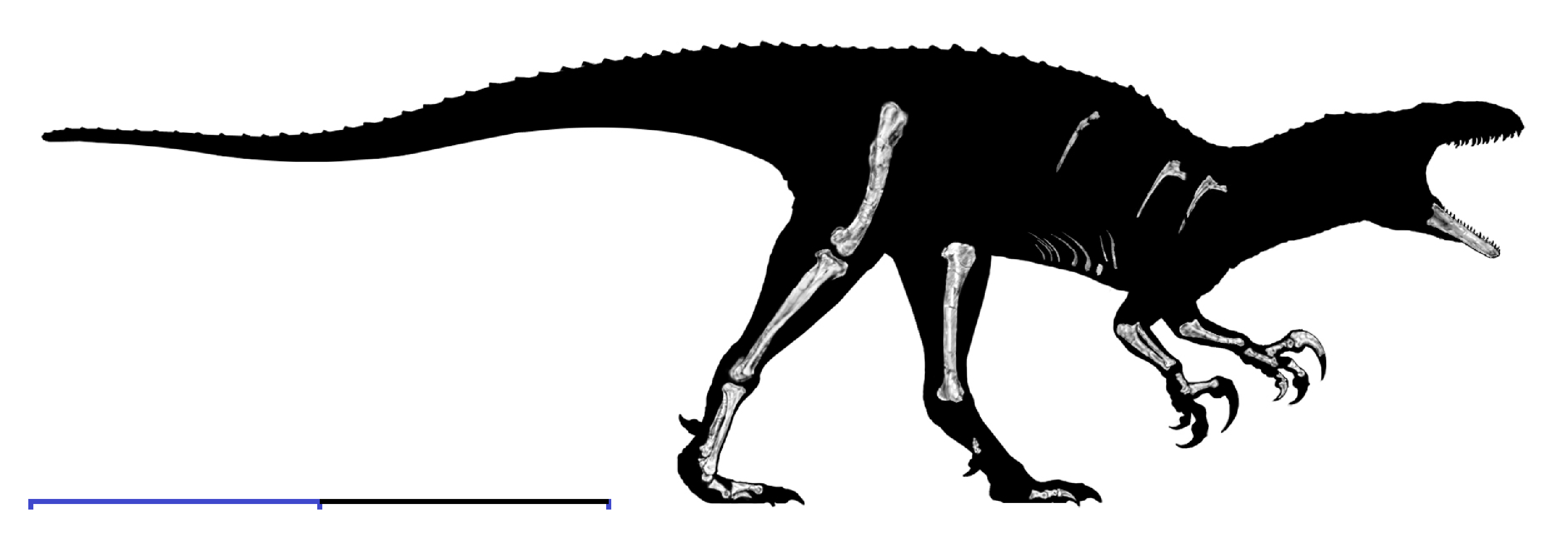
Outdated skeletal reconstruction, showing known remains in white

The first wave of preparation uncovered nine teeth, a left dentary (lower jaw bone), several ribs, an incomplete ilium (upper pelvic bone), parts of both hindlimbs and forelimbs, and some pedal (toe bones) and ungual phalanges (finger bones). This included a giant, recurved manual ungual (hand claw), a trait characteristic of megaraptorans, a clade of theropods. In 2009, Australian paleontologist Scott Hocknull and colleagues published a paper in the journal PLOS One in which they described several recently discovered specimens from the Winton Formation. Hocknull and colleagues scientifically described AODF 604 as the holotype (the specimen that forms the basis and bears the name of a species) of a new genus and species of theropod, Australovenator wintonensis. The generic name Australovenator derives from the Latin australis "southern", in reference to being unearthed in the Southern Hemisphere in Australia, and venator "hunter", in reference to its carnivorous diet. The specific name witonensis derives from Winton, the township the holotype was collected in. In the same paper, Hocknull and colleagues named Wintonotitan and Diamantinasaurus, two sauropods that were found in the "Matilda site".

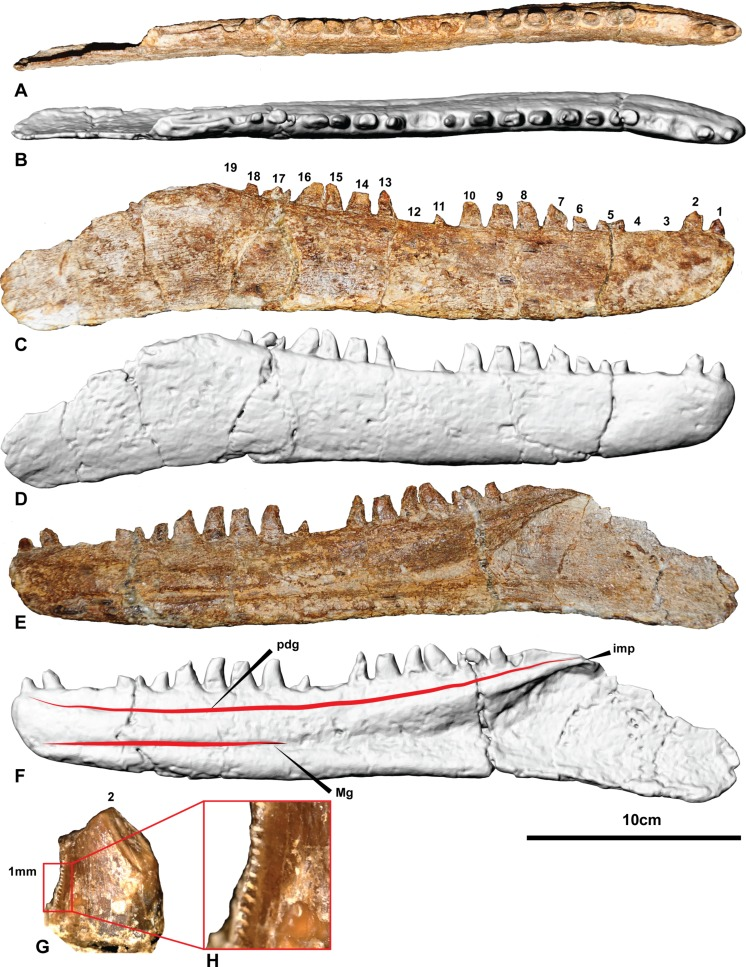
A right dentary (lower jaw).

Although the holotype was first discovered in 2006 and first described in 2009, the processing of excavating the "Matilda site" is still ongoing. This included the preparation of additional fossils from the concretion containing the holotype, including elements of the arms and hands (which were described in 2012), hindlimbs (which were described in 2013), and the right dentary (which was described in 2015). In total, the holotype is represented by both dentaries, many teeth, three dorsal ribs, some rib shaft pieces, humeri (upper arm bones), radii (upper forearm bones), ulnae (lower forearm bones), radialae (a carpal bone), both first metacarpals, incomplete manii (hands), an ilium fragment, left femur (thigh bone), tibiae (shin bones), fibulae, left astragalus, incomplete peses (feet), and nine gastralia fragments.

=== Rapator and assigned material ===
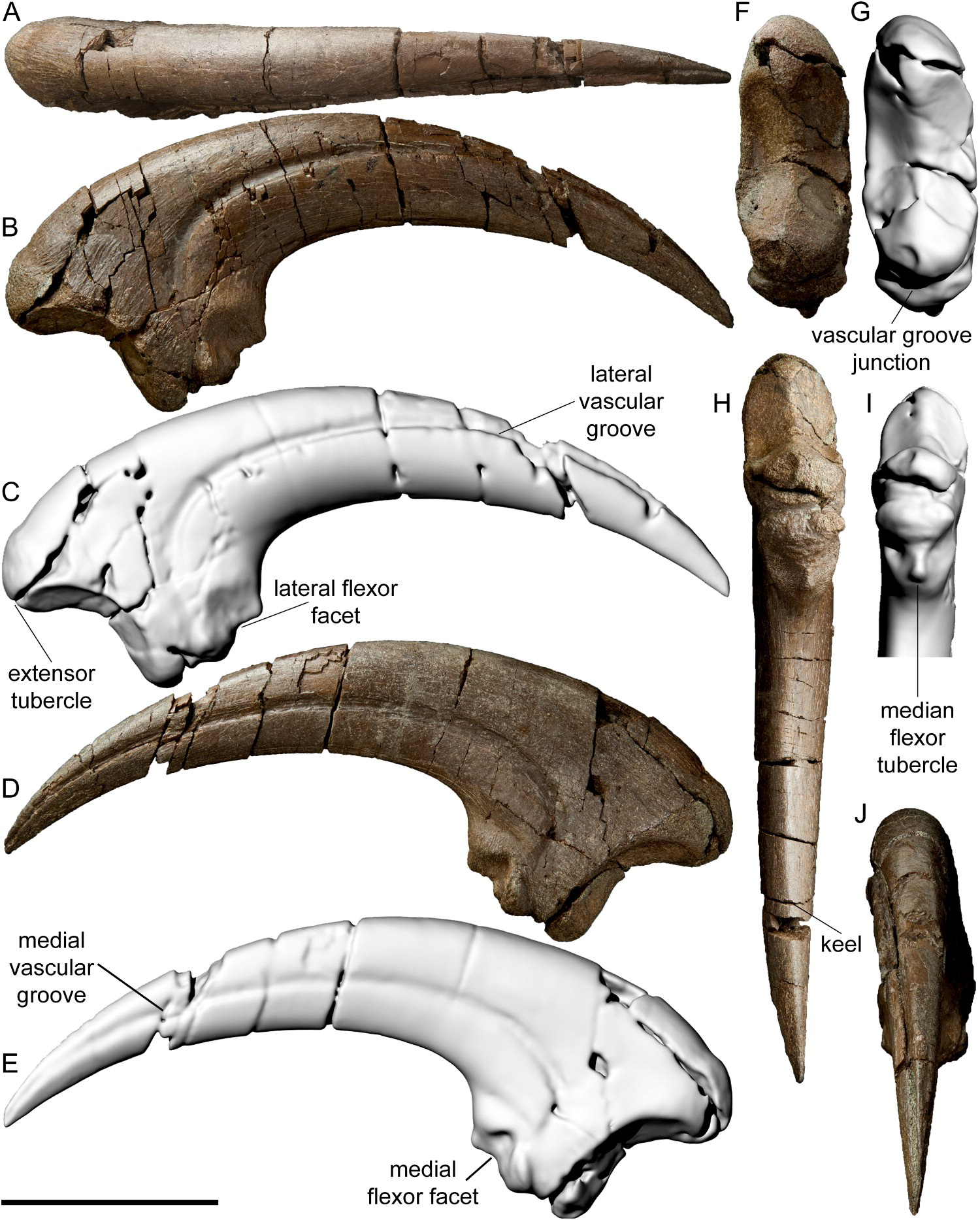
A manual ungual of cf. Australovenator in several views

In 1932, German paleontologist Friedrich von Huene named Rapator ornitholestoides, a species now recognized to be a megaraptoran, on the basis of a single metacarpal. This fossil was found in Lightning Ridge, an outcrop of the Cenomanian-aged Griman Creek Formation. Following the discovery of Australovenator, comparisons were made of the two. While Hocknull and colleagues (2009) noted some differences in the anatomy based on a poorly preserved metacarpal I from Australovenator, their relationships were indeterminate. In 2010, Argentine researcher Federico Agnolín and colleagues classified Rapator as a megaraptoran, possibly even Australovenator's sister taxon (closest relative). They followed up by stating that Megaraptor was less similar to Rapator than Australovenator, and that no definite differences between the latter two could be identified. In 2013, Australian researcher Matt White and colleagues stated that the two were both morphologically and temporally different from one another, as the Griman Creek Formation is 10 million years older than the Winton Formation. This suggests that the two are not synonyms (the same taxon).

In 1981, Australian paleontologist Ralph E. Molnar described an isolated left astragalus (NMVP 150070) that was discovered in an outcrop of the Aptian-aged Wonthaggi Formation in Victoria, Australia. He assigned the fossil to a species of pygmy Allosaurus, calling it Allosaurus sp. Although some studies later considered it an allosauroid, allosaurid, or abelisauroid, the consensus is that it belongs to a megaraptoran. In a 2019 paper, Australian paleontologist Stephen Poropat and colleagues described several isolated megaraptoran fossils from the upper Aptian to lower Albian-aged Eumeralla Formation of Victoria, Australia. This material included two isolated teeth, two right manual unguals (hand claws), a right astragalus, and fragments possibly from a right pedal phalanx. The authors provisionally assigned the fossils to cf. Australovenator. In 2020, White and colleagues described a heavily eroded specimen from the "Marilyn" Site of the Winton Formation. This specimen, comprising two vertebrae, three incomplete metatarsals, and a pedal phalanx fragment, showed size and morphological differences from Australovenator. The authors went on to state that this could be because of ontogenetic changes, intraspecific variation, or the presence of a second, distinct megaraptorid in the Winton Formation.

== Description ==
Size of Australovenator compared to a human

Megaraptorans were bipedal, carnivorous theropods with elongated snouts, large arms, and relatively enlarged claws. Australovenator was a relatively lightweight predator, leading Hocknull to coin it the "cheetah of its time". South American megaraptorans attained very large sizes, exceeding 7 m (23 ft) in length in genera like Megaraptor. In contrast, in a 2009 interview Hocknull stated that Australovenator was 2 metres (6.6 ft) tall at the hip and 6 metres (20 ft) in length. In 2016, American paleontologist Gregory S. Paul placed Australovenator at 6 metres (20 ft) long and weighed 500 kilograms (1,100 lb). However, a 2014 study by American researcher Roger Benson and colleagues claimed its body mass was about 310 kilograms (680 lb). Fossils of a megaraptoran, possibly Australovenator itself, from the Eumeralla Formation come from a slightly smaller individual than the holotype. However, morphologically they are very similar.

=== Dentary and teeth ===
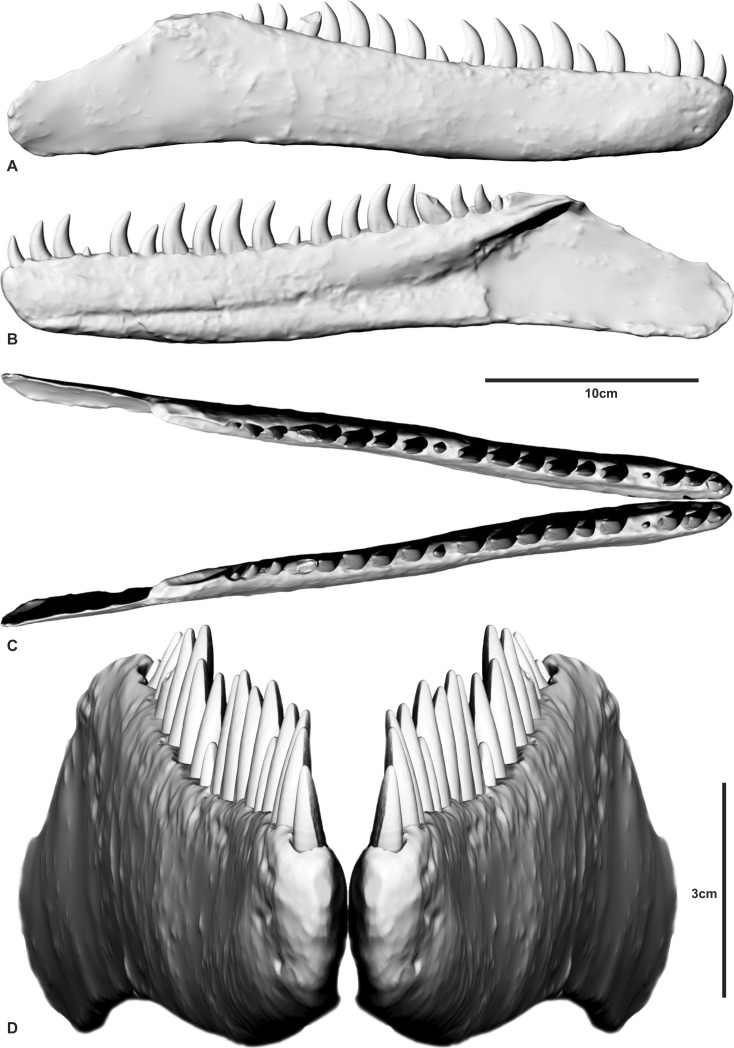
Reconstructed mandibles (lower jaws).

Overall, the dentary is gracile and long, measuring 342.6 millimetres (13.49 in) in length as preserved. The end of the symphysis (the area in which the dentaries meet) is rounded and lacks a "chin", unlike those of allosauroids like Allosaurus. Each dentary bears 19 alveoli (tooth sockets), all of which touch interdental plates. These plates connect on their anterior (front) and posterior (back) ends, creating an elongated interdental ridge that trails across the whole tooth row. On the medial (inner) face of the dentary is a shallow paradental groove which runs below the alveolar margin and makes up the ventral (bottom) side of a protruding band of bone. This band is also known from Neovenator, but is absent in Eotyrannus. Although foramina (small pits of bone) on the lateral (outside) side of the dentary were described by Hocknull and colleagues (2009), later analysis has determined that Australovenator lacked these foramina. The absence of this feature may be an autapomorphy (characteristic unique to a species) of Australovenator.

Its teeth are recurved with fine serrations, though the location of the serrations differs between the anterior and posterior teeth. Those with circular to quadrangular bases and two series of serrations, one on the lingual (facing towards the back of the jaw) carina (cutting edges) and the other on the distal carina, come from the anteriormost section of the dentary or premaxilla. In contrast, teeth that are thinner with serrations on the mesial (towards the front midline of the jaw) margin and the distal carina come from the posterior region of the dentary. Unlike the wrinkly teeth of carcharodontosaurids and Neovenator, Australovenator's and Fukuiraptor's, a megaraptoran from Japan, are smooth at the base. Uniquely compared to most theropods, the dentition of megaraptorans like Australovenator displays some heterodonty, as the anatomy of the mesial and distal teeth are different. This suggests a functional difference between the two kinds of teeth.

=== Postcrania ===
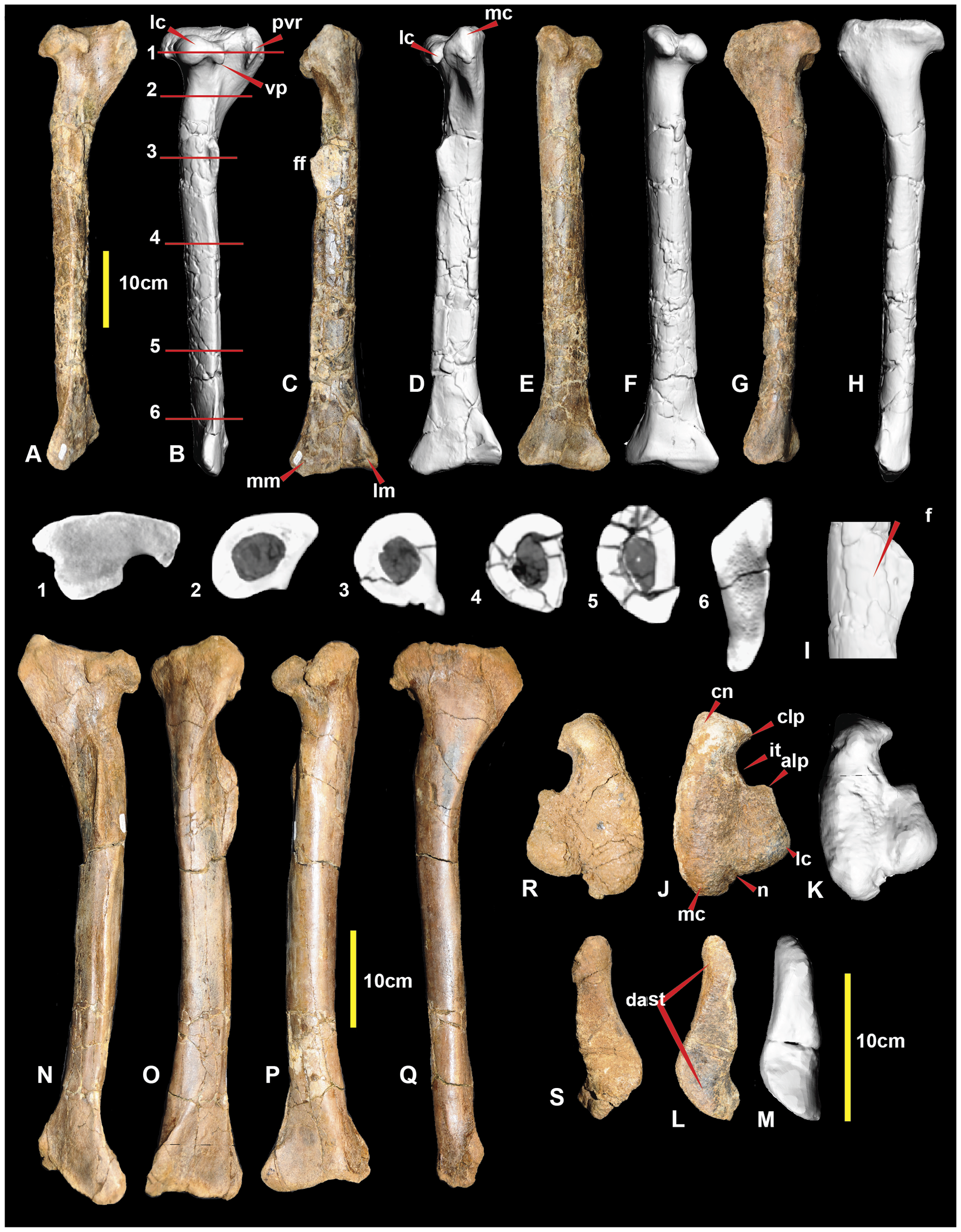
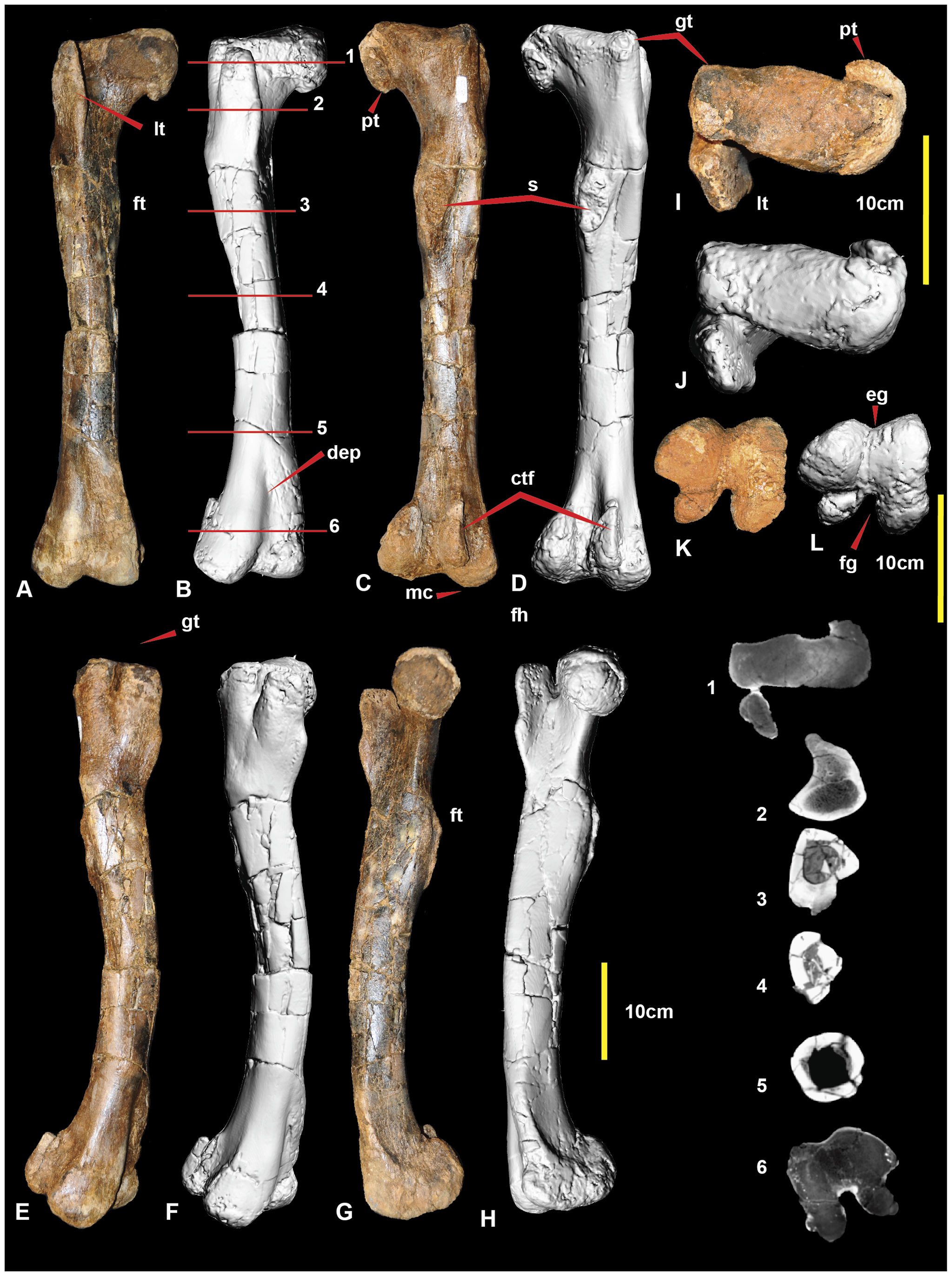
Tibiae (left) and femora in several views

The humerus is S-shaped in anterior and lateral views, as in theropods like Allosaurus, Megaraptor, and Ornitholestes, and bears a prominent deltopectoral crest. It has a bowed shaft, similar to that of Fukuiraptor. A large furrow runs down the medial side of the shaft, as in Fukuiraptor. On the distal (away from body) end, both condyles (protuberances of bone for articulation) are pronounced and significantly rounded anteriorly to a greater extent than seen in Allosaurus and Xuanhanosaurus. These condyles are bifurcated by deep grooves, which are not found in non-coelurosaurian tetanurans like allosaurids but are similar to those of coelurosaurs like Guanlong. Although the radial condyle is taller and wider than that of the ulnar condyle, but not larger than it. This is unlike the distal humeral condyles of Fukuiraptor, where the radial condyle is twice as large as the ulnar condyle. On the posterior face of the humeral shaft is an enlarged tubercule, which is autapomorphic of the taxon. Australovenator preserves giant, sickle-shaped manual unguals, the largest on the hand being on the first finger. The proximal end of the unguals are tall and taper to a sharp tip. These unguals are strongly compressed mediolaterally (flat) with large vascular grooves running down their lateral (side) faces.

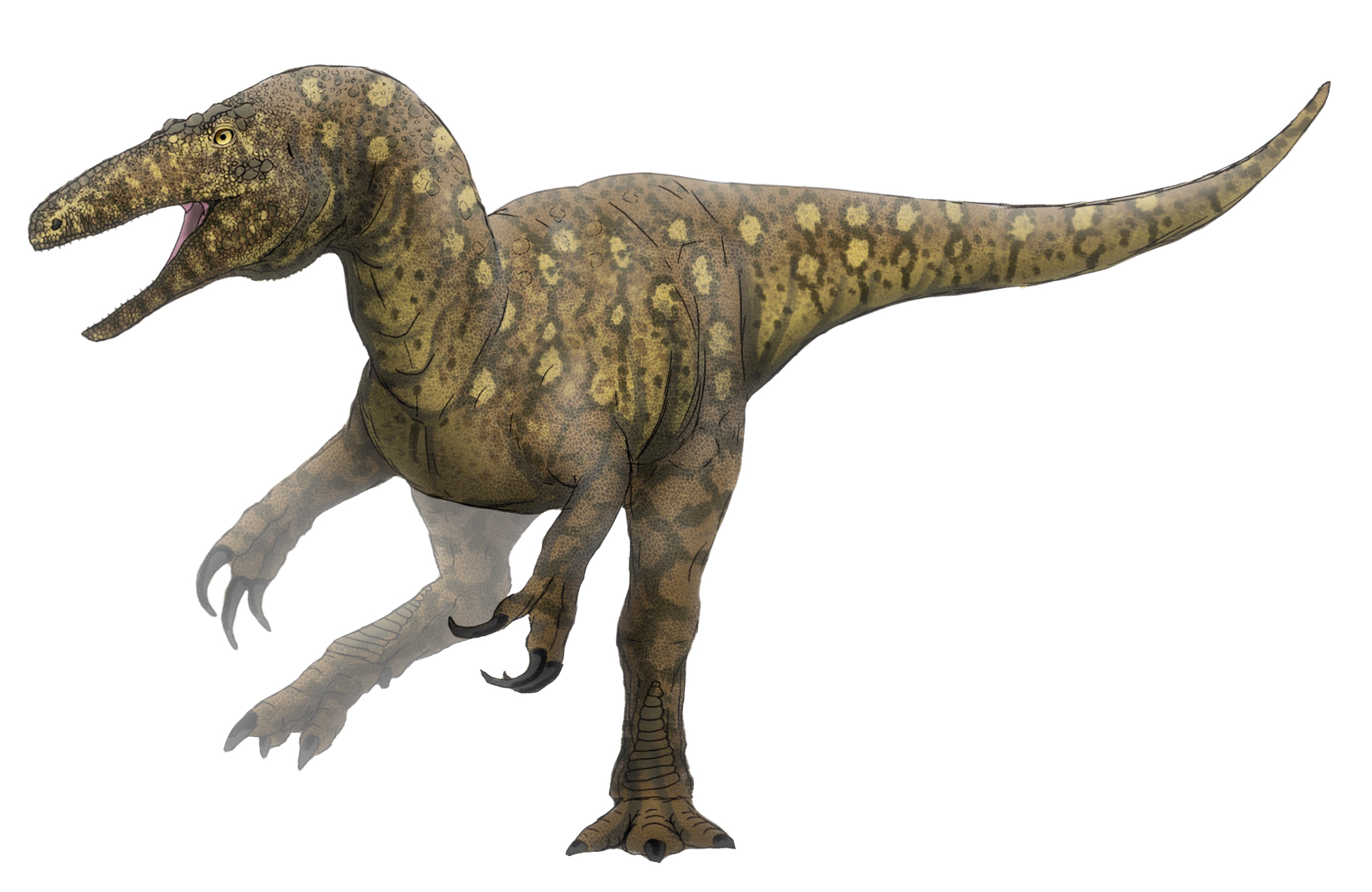
Life restoration.

Like other megaraptorans, Australovenator has a high humerus/femur length ratio (0.56). This is around the same as that of Suchomimus (0.54), but higher than that of Chilantaisaurus (0.46). Unlike Chilantaisaurus and Neovenator, Australovenator's femora were marked by large grooves that tapered disto-laterally (down to the left) on their posterior sides. Its femoral condyles were closely spaced from each other and weakly divided, though not to the extent seen in Neovenator. The left medial condyle points distally, a trait characteristic of megaraptorans or neovenatorids. In contrast to the robustly built fibulae of Neovenator, Australovenator's are elongate and lithe. The metatarsus is gracile compared to those of Neovenator, Chilantaisaurus, and Allosaurus. A distinct ridge is on the posterior face of Australovenator's astragali, which runs from the center of the bone to the lateral edge. This trait is absent in relatives like Fukuiraptor. More pedal phalanges are known from Australovenator than most other megaraptorans. Similar to the other megaraptoran Aerosteon, Australovenator's dorsal ribs contain pneumatic cavities (air sacs).

== Classification ==
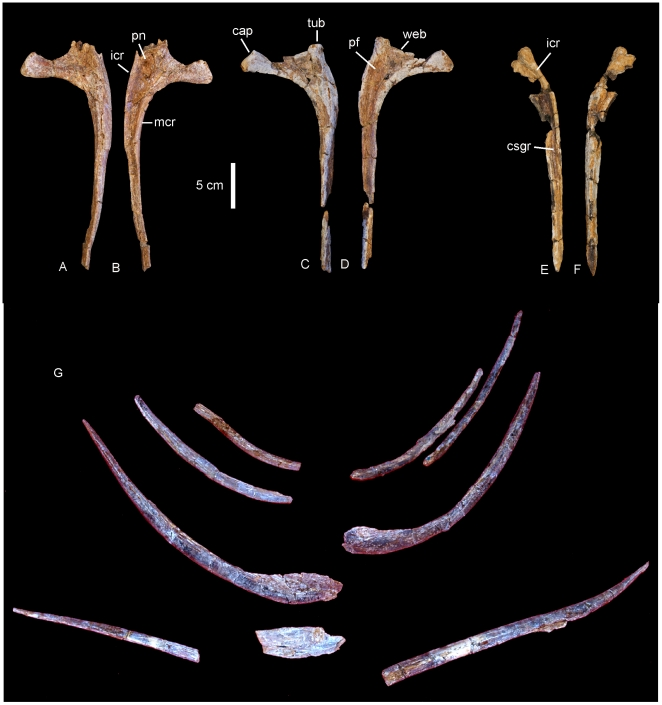
Ribs (top) and gastralia (bottom) of the holotype.

Australovenator belonged to the clade Megaraptora, a group of theropods that existed during the Cretaceous period in Asia, South America, and Oceania, and possibly Africa, North America, and Europe. Most megaraptorans are only known from fragmentary or isolated remains, leading to their relationships to be poorly known. Although they are always considered tetanurans, whether they are carcharodontosaurs, basal coelurosaurs, or tyrannosauroids is hotly debated. Megaraptora was not recognized as a group until 2010, when it was named by American paleontologist Roger Benson and collagues. They considered it a subgroup of Neovenatoridae, but later studies have generally opposed this. When initially described, Australovenator was considered Theropoda incertae sedis, although at the time few megaraptorans were known.

In their description of Megaraptora, Benson and colleagues found Australovenator was a megaraptoran in their phylogenetic analysis. However, Australovenator was sister taxon to Fukuiraptor and the two were outside of Megaraptoridae itself. The same results were recovered by Coria and Currie (2016) and Novas and colleagues (2013). In 2016, Argentine researcher Sebastian Apesteguía and colleagues supported the allosauroid affinities of Megaraptora, including Australovenator. However, they also said they could be basal coelurosaurs. Below are the results of Coria and Currie (2016):

- Allosauria
  - Allosauridae
  - Carcharodontosauria
    - Carcharodontosauridae
    - Neovenatoridae
      - Neovenator
      - Siats
      - Chilantaisaurus
      - Megaraptora
        - - Fukuiraptor
          - Australovenator
        - Megaraptoridae
          - Megaraptor
          - Murusraptor
          - Aerosteon
          - Orkoraptor

Most recent studies have found Megaraptora as a coelurosaurian clade, often sister to or within Tyrannosauroidea. Australovenator itself is typically a basal megaraptorid. In their phylogenetic analyses, Ibiricu and colleagues (2025) recovered Australovenator as a basal member of Megaraptoridae, at a similar grade to Orkoraptor. Their analysis recovered megaraptorans as part of the theropod clade Coelurosauria, as the sister group to the Tyrannosauroidea. These results are displayed in the cladogram below (strict consensus of most parsimonious trees, after pruning Aoniraptor):

- - Tyrannosauroidea
  - Megaraptora
    - Phuwiangvenator
    - - Vayuraptor
      - Fukuiraptor
      - Megaraptoridae
        - LRF 100–106
        - - Australovenator
          - - Orkoraptor
            - - - UNPSJB-PV-944 & 958
                - Murusraptor
              - - Joaquinraptor
                - - Megaraptor
                  - - Aerosteon
                    - Maip
                    - Tratayenia

== Palaeobiology ==
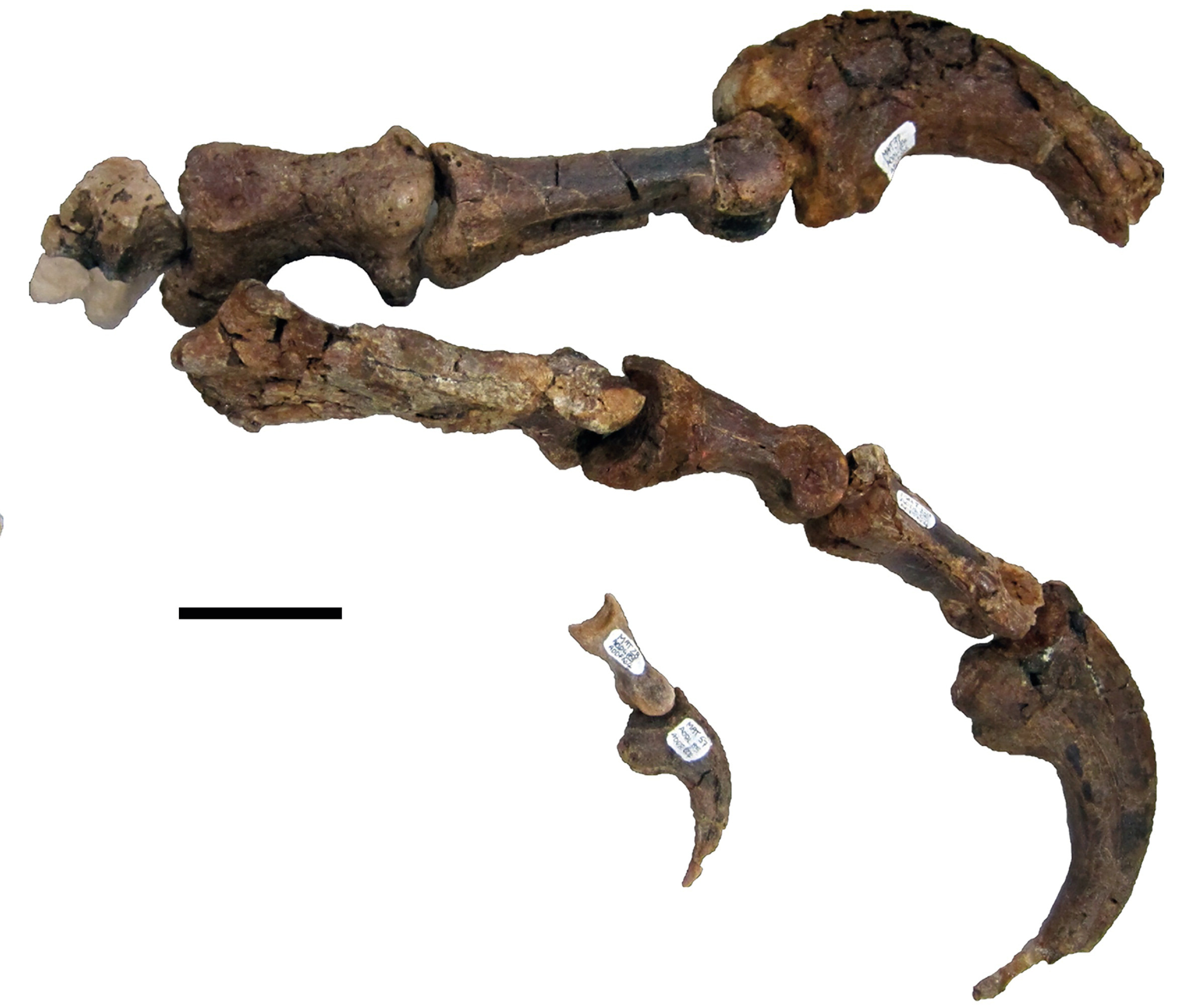
Left manus (hand), illustrating the size of the large unguals (claws).

With comprehensive and well-preserved remains of its hands and feet, Australovenator has been made a topic of various research papers studying the dynamics of theropod limbs.

=== Arms ===
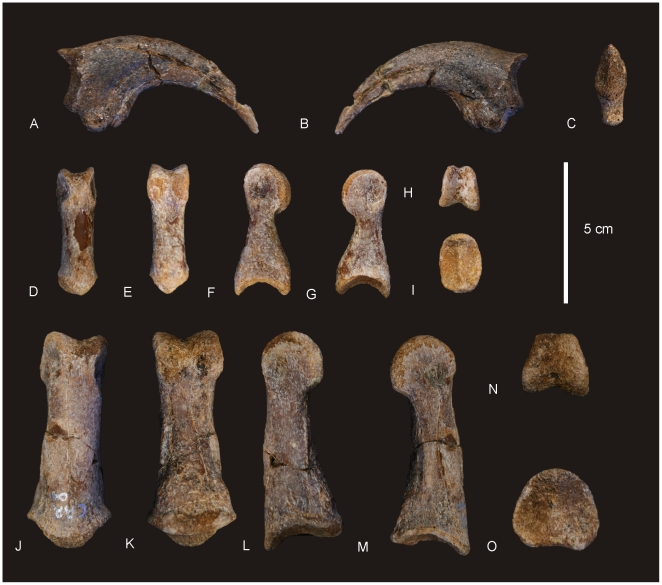
Bones from the holotype manus (hand).

A 2015 study tested the range of motion of Australovenator's arms using computer models and found that it had flexible arms, with the forearms capable of making an angle of 144 to 66 degrees with the humerus, an elbow range of motion similar to that of maniraptoriforms. Unusually, its radius could slide independently of the ulna when its arm was flexed, similar to that of birds but unlike most non-avian dinosaurs. However, the study also found that Australovenator's fingers were capable of extension far beyond those of any other sampled theropod, with only Dilophosaurus having capabilities even near it. This study concluded that Australovenator's flexibility, facilitated by a combination of traits in both primitive and advanced theropods, played a role in prey capture, giving it the ability to grasp prey towards its chest to make it easier for its weak jaws to disembowel food. The gracile morphology of the skull also concludes that this genus had a specialization towards prey capture using its arms and hands.

A 2016 study used CT scans of an emu foot to digitally reconstruct the musculature and soft tissue of an Australovenator foot, as well as determine how soft tissue affects flexibility. The study determined that muscular range of motion is often overestimated when not accounting for soft tissue and that soft tissue reconstruction is vital for making future analyses of theropod flexibility more accurate. A review of hindlimb elements described in 2013 re-identified several phalanges which were initially positioned incorrectly. In addition, it noted that Australovenator's phalanx II-3 was splayed, a pathology that may have resulted from the impacts of kicking motions. Some modern birds, such as the cassowary, are known to use their second toe as weapons in defensive or territorial fights.

=== Feet ===
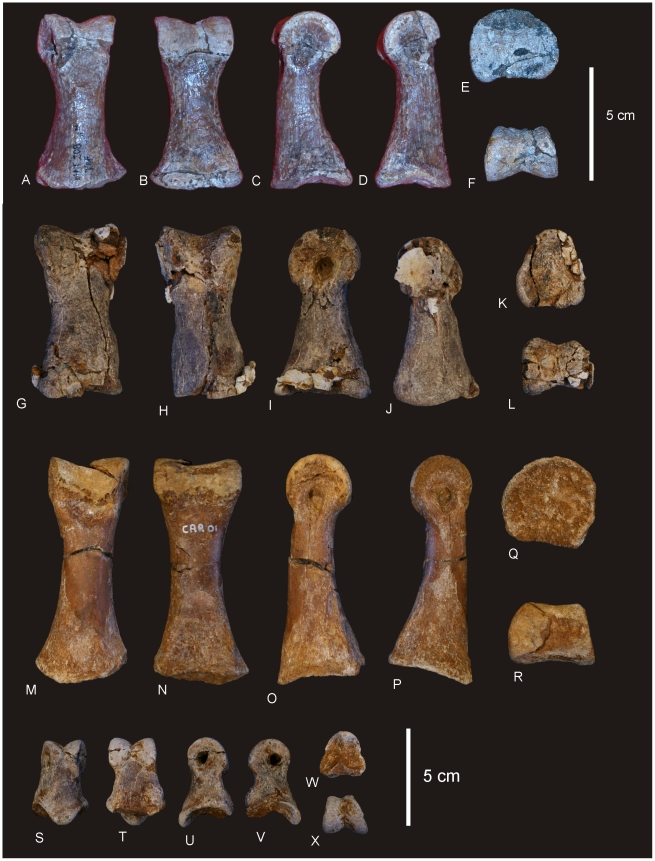
Pedal phalanges (toe bones) of the holotype.

A 2017 follow-up to the 2016 study used a 3D-printed model of the reconstructed foot to make footprints in a matrix of clay and sand in an effort to understand the creation of dinosaur footprints. The study specifically was designed to clarify the identity of particular controversial footprints from Lark Quarry, which may have been left from either a large theropod (like Australovenator) or an ornithopod (like Muttaburrasaurus). The study found that the artificial Australovenator footprints were similar to those at Lark Quarry, concluding that the trackways in question were likely those of a theropod. The writers of the study expressed interest in creating a reconstruction of a Muttaburrasaurus foot as an extension of the study, although no Muttaburrasaurus pedal material is known.

The right fourth pedal phalanx from the third digit features an unusual tuberosity on the lateral side of the proximal (towards body) articular facet (area where the phalanx would articulate with another). This may be a result of a pathology, such as an infection or arthritis. However, this could not be confirmed.

== Palaeoecology ==
AODL 604 was found about 60 kilometres (37 mi) northwest of Winton, near Elderslie Station. It was recovered from the lower part of the Winton Formation, dated to the late Cenomanian. AODL 604 was found in a clay layer between sandstone layers. This has been interpreted as an oxbow lake, or billabong, deposit that was located at the eastern boundary of the Eromanga Sea. This formation was laid down at a paleolatitude of about 51 degrees South, which places it at around the same latitude as modern-day Patagonia and New Zealand. Plants known from the formation include ferns, ginkgoes, gymnosperms, and angiosperms. When Australovenator lived, central Queensland had a warm, wet climate and conditions that encouraged plant growth for around two thirds of the year. The environment was humid, about 74% Rh, and had significant seasonal rainfall. Summers were hot, about 21°C, while moderate seasons varied between ~9°C to -2°C.

In these rivers and lakes lived a diverse group of aquatic animals, including the crocodylomorphs Confractosuchus and Isisfordia, an unnamed plesiosaur, an unnamed chelid turtle, an indeterminate shark, the lungfish Metaceratodus, and the ichthyodectiform Cladocyclus. Other animals found in the Winton include an unnamed varanoid lizard, an indeterminate cynodont mammal, several arthropods, and molluscs like the freshwater snail Melanoides and the bivalve Hyridella. Several herbivorous ornithischians have been described, though none are named, from the groups Ankylosauria, Neornithischia, and Ornithopoda. Sauropods are the most common dinosaurs in the formation, represented by the diamantinasaurians Australotitan, Diamantinasaurus, Savannasaurus, Wintonotitan, and an unnamed titanosauriform. The only other theropod described from the Winton is an indeterminate megaraptorid that is larger than Australovenator. A pterosaur, Ferrodraco, has also been reported from the formation.
