= Jilantai Salt Lake =

- Jilantai Dabus
- Interactive map of Jilantai Salt Lake
- Location: Alxa League, Inner Mongolia, China
- Coordinates: 39°42′N 105°40′E
- Type: Salt lake
- Surface area: 40.35 km^{2} (15.58 sq mi)

Jilantai Salt Lake, also known as Jilantai Dabus, is a salt lake located in the Alxa League of the Inner Mongolia Autonomous Region, China. Covering an area of approximately 40.35 km^{2} (15.58 sq mi), it is situated within the Mongolia-Xinjiang Plateau region. Its primary drainage basin is classified as the "Rivers of the Inland Drainage Area," while its secondary drainage basin is designated as the "Hexi Corridor–Alxa Inland Drainage Area". The town of Jilantai is named after this salt lake and is situated 102 kilometers(74.57 miles) north of Bayanhot, the administrative seat of the Alxa League. The name "Jilantai" means "sixty" in Mongolian; it is said to have acquired this name because, historically, sixty households once resided in the area. "Dabus" means "salt" in Mongolian.

The Jilantai Salt Lake covers a total area of 120 km^{2} (46 sq mi), with a salt layer spanning 60 km^{2} (23 sq mi). The entire salt lake takes the form of an elliptical basin; the salt layer has an average thickness of 3 to 5 meters(9.8 to 16.4 feet), reaching a maximum depth of 5.94 m (19.5 ft), and boasts a total reserve exceeding 114 million tons. The table salt produced here is commonly known as "Ji Salt," renowned for its distinctive characteristics: large crystals, minimal impurities, and a rich flavor. In addition to sodium chloride—its most abundant component—the brine also contains various other constituents, including magnesium chloride, potassium chloride, sodium sulfate, and calcium sulfate.

== Jilantai Salt ==
In the first year of the Qianlong reign of the Qing dynasty (1736), Jilantai Salt Lake began to be exploited as a salt field. Originally the private property of the Prince of Alxa Banner, the salt lake was nationalized in 1950 following the Establishment of the People's Republic of China. In 1953, the state-owned Jilantai Saltworks was established; in 1975, it became China's first mechanized lake salt production facility; and in 1986, a subsidiary plant with an annual output of 50,000 tons of vacuum-refined salt was completed, bringing an end to the long history of the people of the Inner Mongolia Autonomous Region consuming only crude salt. In 1990, a production process utilizing integrated boat-based harvesting, transport, and short-distance hydraulic conveyance was implemented. Following restructuring in 1997, the entity was reorganized into the Inner Mongolia Jilantai Salt & Chemical Group and Jilantai Salt & Chemical Co., Ltd.; its "Silver Lake" brand refined salt has since been recognized as a renowned product of the Inner Mongolia Autonomous Region. In 2004, the Alxa League administration formulated a strategic vision to transform Jilantai into the nation's largest industrial base for salt and chemical production. In 2005, the Jilantai Salt & Chemical Group Corporation was transferred in its entirety to the China National Salt Industry Corporation.

== Transportation ==
- Jilantai Railway
