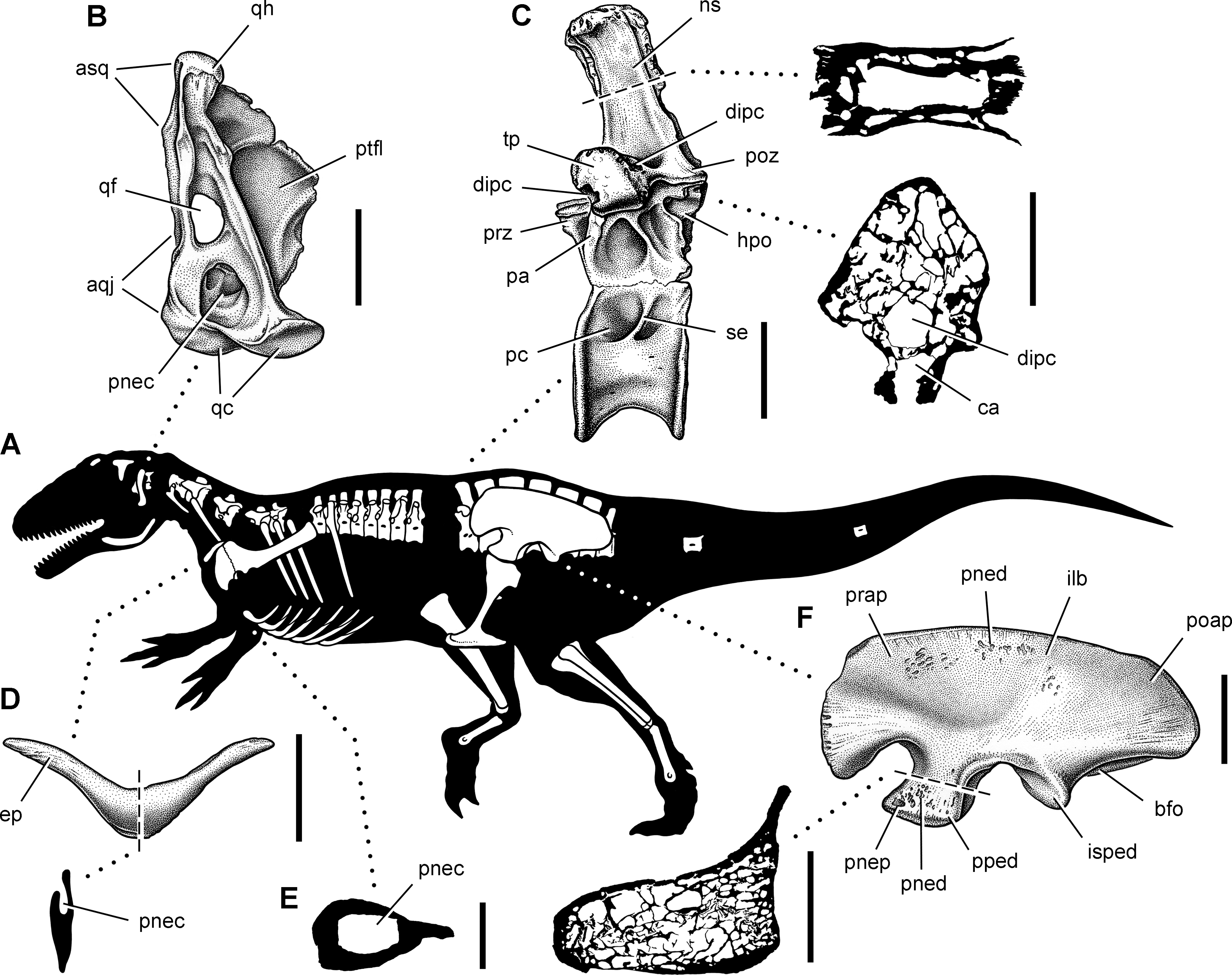
- Skeletal diagram illustrating air-filled bones

Scientific classification
- Kingdom: Animalia
- Phylum: Chordata
- Class: Reptilia
- Clade: Dinosauria
- Clade: Saurischia
- Clade: Theropoda
- Clade: †Megaraptora
- Family: †Megaraptoridae
- Genus: †Aerosteon; Sereno et al. 2009

Type species
- †Aerosteon riocoloradensis Sereno et al. 2009

= Aerosteon =

Aerosteon Temporal range: Campanian

Extinct genus of dinosaurs

Aerosteon is a genus of megaraptoran dinosaur from the Late Cretaceous period of Argentina. Its remains were discovered in 1996 in the late Campanian Anacleto Formation. The genus contains a single known species, A. riocoloradensis. Its generic name derives from the Greek words ἀήρ (aer, "air") and ὀστέον (osteon, "bone"), meaning "air bone," while its specific name refers to the discovery site approximately 1 km (0.6 miles) north of the Río Colorado in Mendoza Province, Argentina. The genus exhibits evidence of a bird-like respiratory system.

== Discovery ==
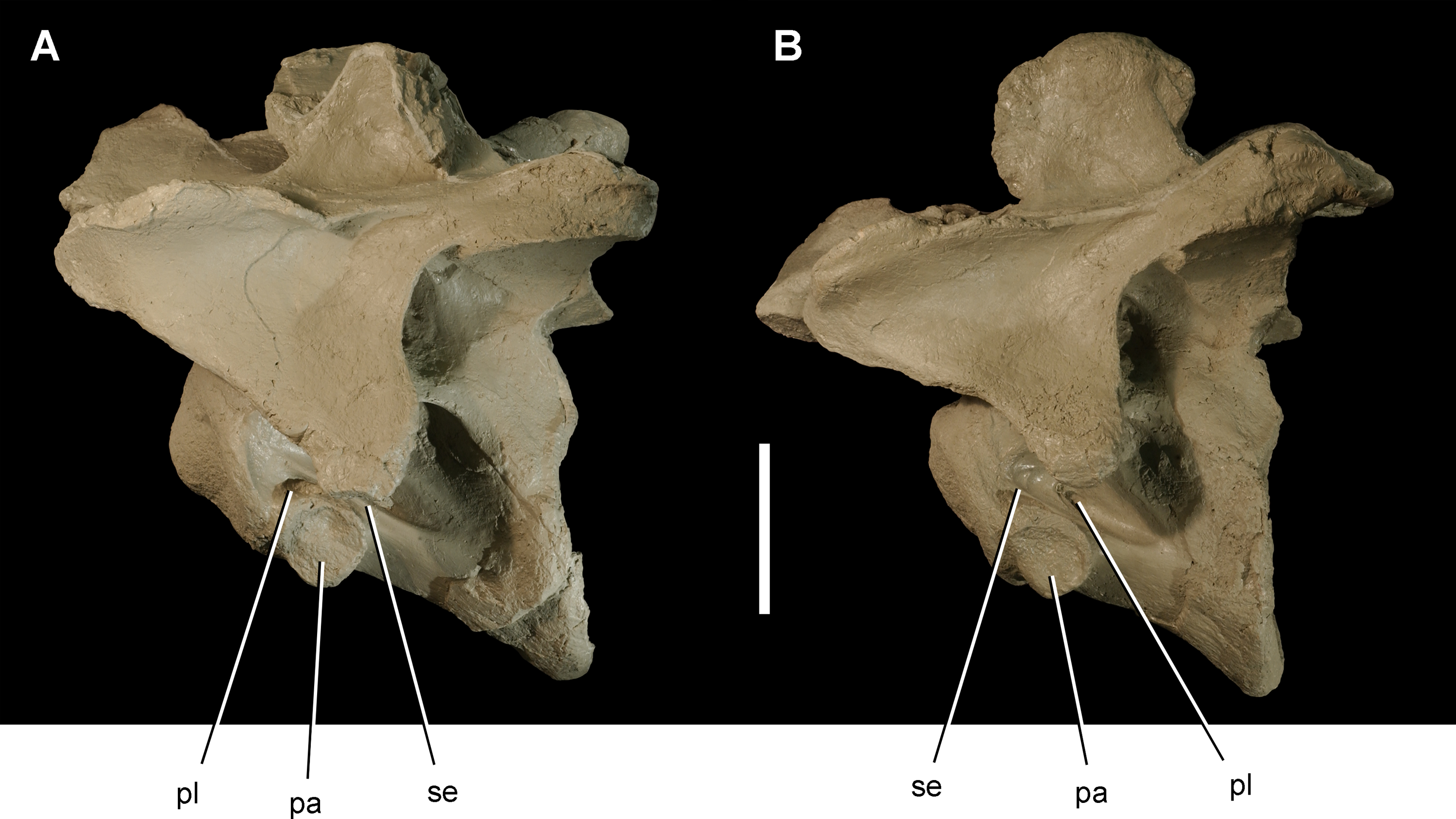
Neck vertebrae

Aerosteon was first discovered in 1996 and was first described by Sereno et al. in a paper which appeared in the online journal PLoS ONE in September 2008. However, at the time, the International Code of Zoological Nomenclature did not recognize online publication of names for new species as valid unless print copies were also produced and distributed to several libraries, and that this action is noted in the paper itself. PLoS ONE initially failed to meet this requirement for Aerosteon. On May 21, 2009, the journal's managing editor coordinated with the ICZN to correct this oversight, publishing a comment to the original paper with an addendum stating that the requirements had been met as of that date. Consequently, though the description appeared in 2008, Aerosteon was not a valid name until 2009.

The holotype specimen, MCNA-PV-3137, consists of some cranial bones, a number of partial or complete vertebrae from the neck, back, and sacrum, several cervical and dorsal ribs, gastralia, furcula (wishbone), left scapulocoracoid, left ilium, and left and right pubes. The incomplete fusion of some of its bones indicate that it was not quite fully mature. No dental material is known for this taxon as the isolated tooth initially referred to the holotype was revealed to belong to an abelisaurid theropod.

== Description ==
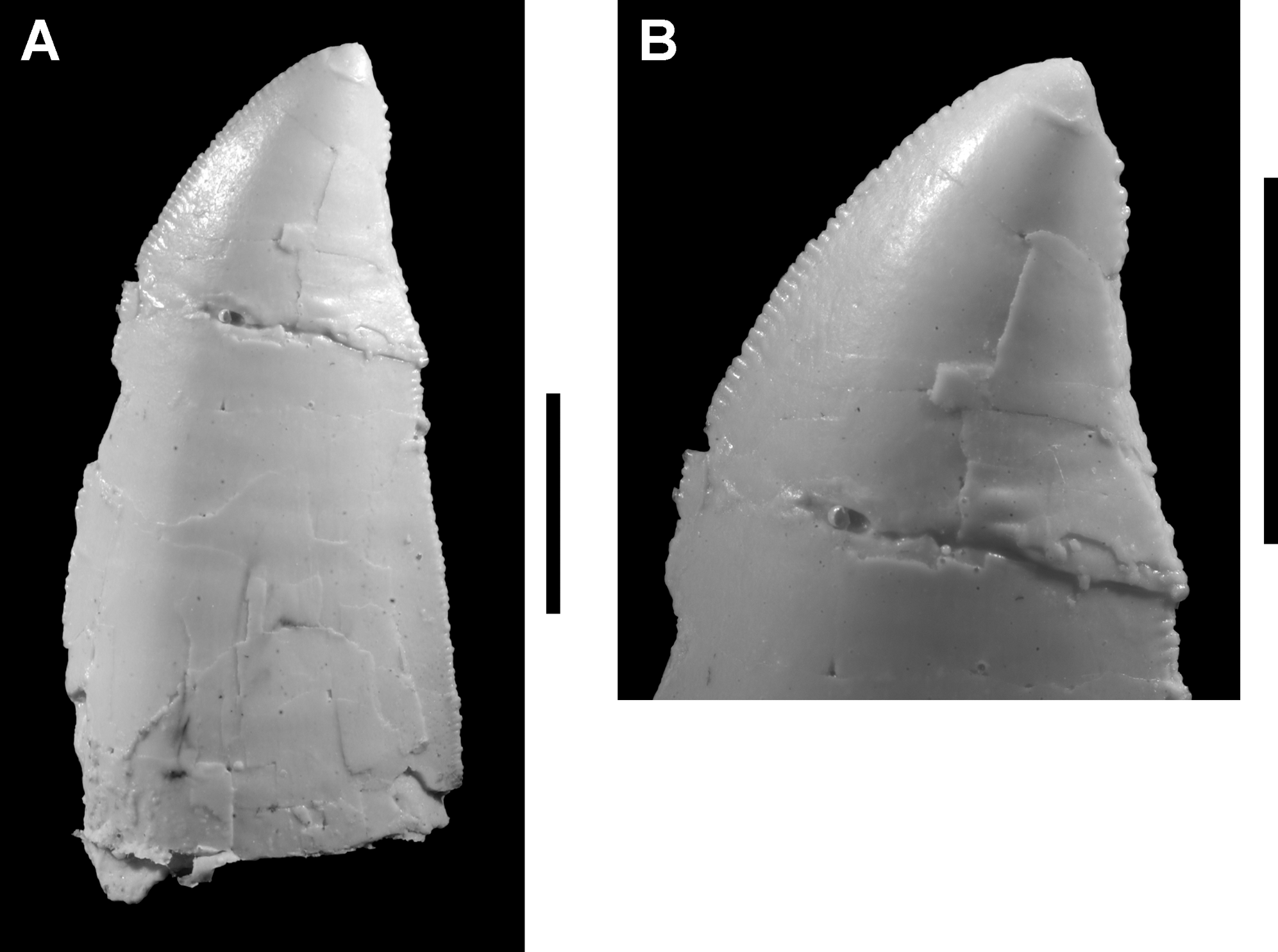
Abelisaurid tooth initially referred to the holotype of Aerosteon

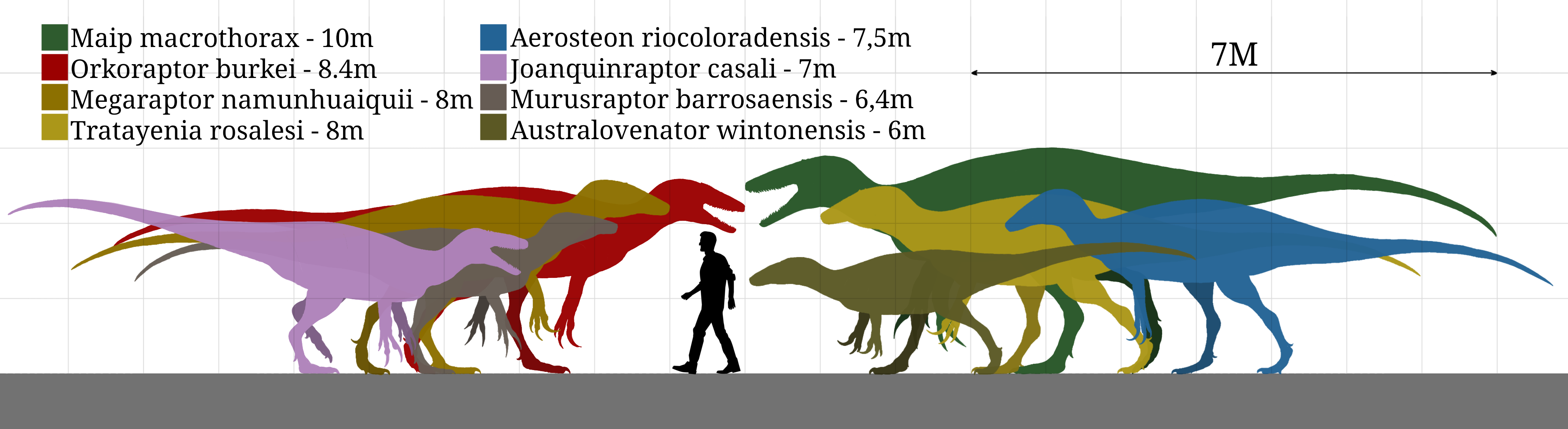
Size of various megaraptorids; Aerosteon in blue

Initially Aerosteon was estimated at 9 to 10 meters (30 to 33 ft). In 2010, however, Gregory S. Paul, estimated it at 6 meters (20 ft) and 500 kilograms (1,100 lb). Later in 2016, Molina-Pérez and Larramendi gave a length of 7.5 meters (25 ft) and a weight of 1 metric ton (1.1 short tons).

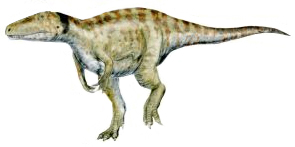
Life restoration

== Classification ==
Aerosteon did not initially appear to belong to any of the three groups of large theropods that were known to have inhabited the southern continents during this time (namely the Abelisauridae, Carcharodontosauridae or Spinosauridae). Sereno suggested that it might be related to the allosauroid radiation of the Jurassic period, and this was supported in subsequent studies that recognized a clade of late-surviving, lightly built, advanced allosauroids with large hand claws similar to the spinosaurs, called the Megaraptora, within the allosaur family Neovenatoridae. A later analysis has placed Megaraptora, including Aerosteon, within the Tyrannosauroidea. Megaraptorans have since been also considered as non-tyrannosauroid basal coelurosaurs in some analyses.

A very close relative of Aerosteon, Murusraptor, was described in 2016 which preserved some bones with a lesser level of pneumaticity. However, the Murusraptor holotype also preserved several teeth which were very dissimilar to the one tooth observed in Aerosteon's holotype. The authors of the description noted that this tooth closely resembled that of abelisaurids and was probably incorrectly referred to Aerosteon. Murusraptor and Aerosteon are practically identical in the structure of their cranial bones and vertebrae, only noticeably differing in the proportions of the ilium, with Aerosteon's ilium being taller than that of Murusraptor.

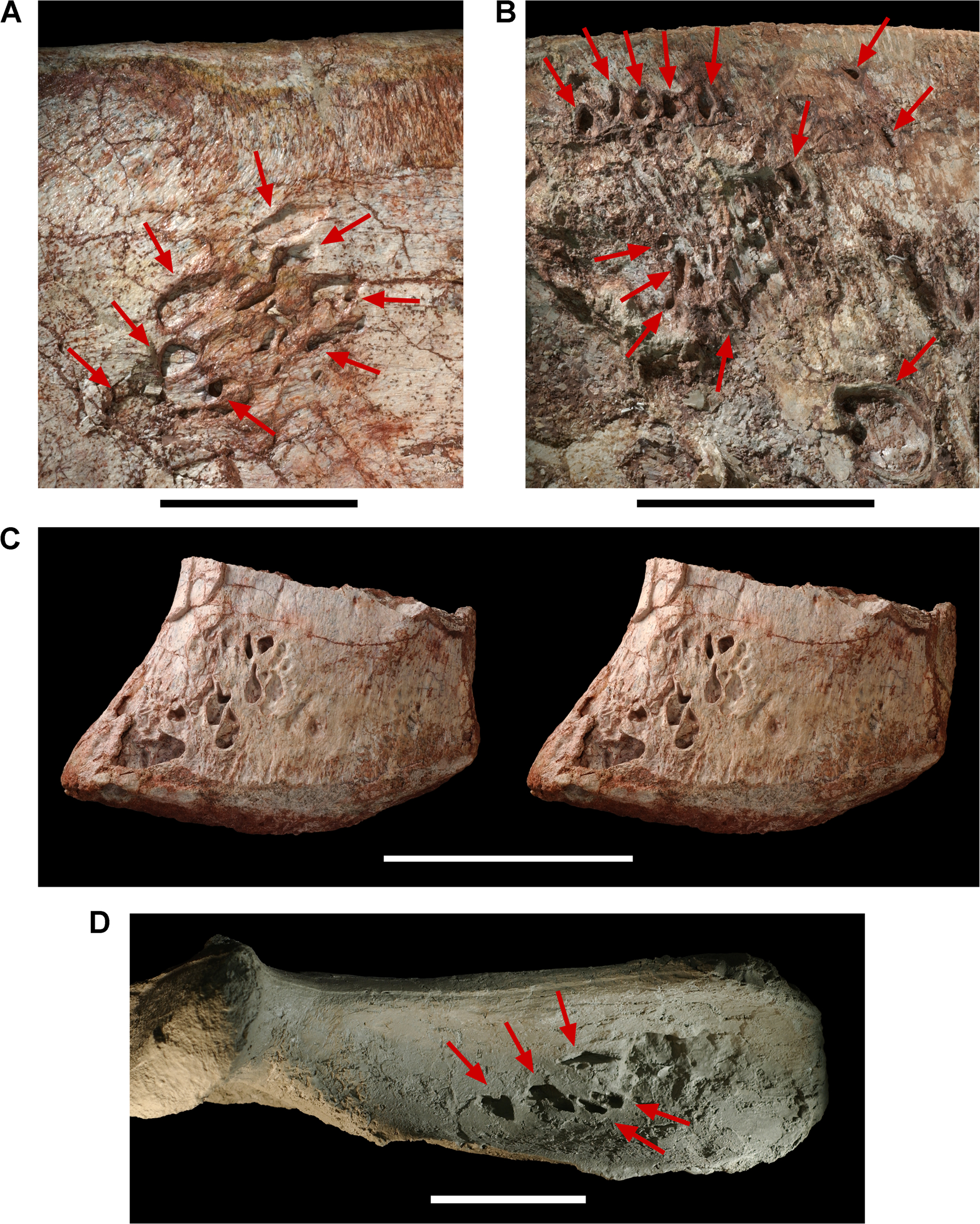
Pneumatopores on the left ilium of A. riocoloradensis

The cladogram below follows the 2010 analysis by Benson, Carrano and Brusatte, which considered megaraptorans as tetanurans.

- Neovenatoridae
  - Neovenator
  - unnamed
    - Chilantaisaurus
    - Megaraptora
      - - Australovenator
        - Fukuiraptor
      - ?Orkoraptor
      - - Aerosteon
        - Megaraptor

The cladogram shown below follows an analysis by Porfiri et al., 2014, which recovered megaraptorans as tyrannosauroids.

- Megaraptora
  - Fukuiraptor
  - Megaraptoridae
    - Australovenator
    - Aerosteon
    - unnamed
      Orkoraptor
    - Eotyrannus
    - Megaraptor

== Paleobiology ==
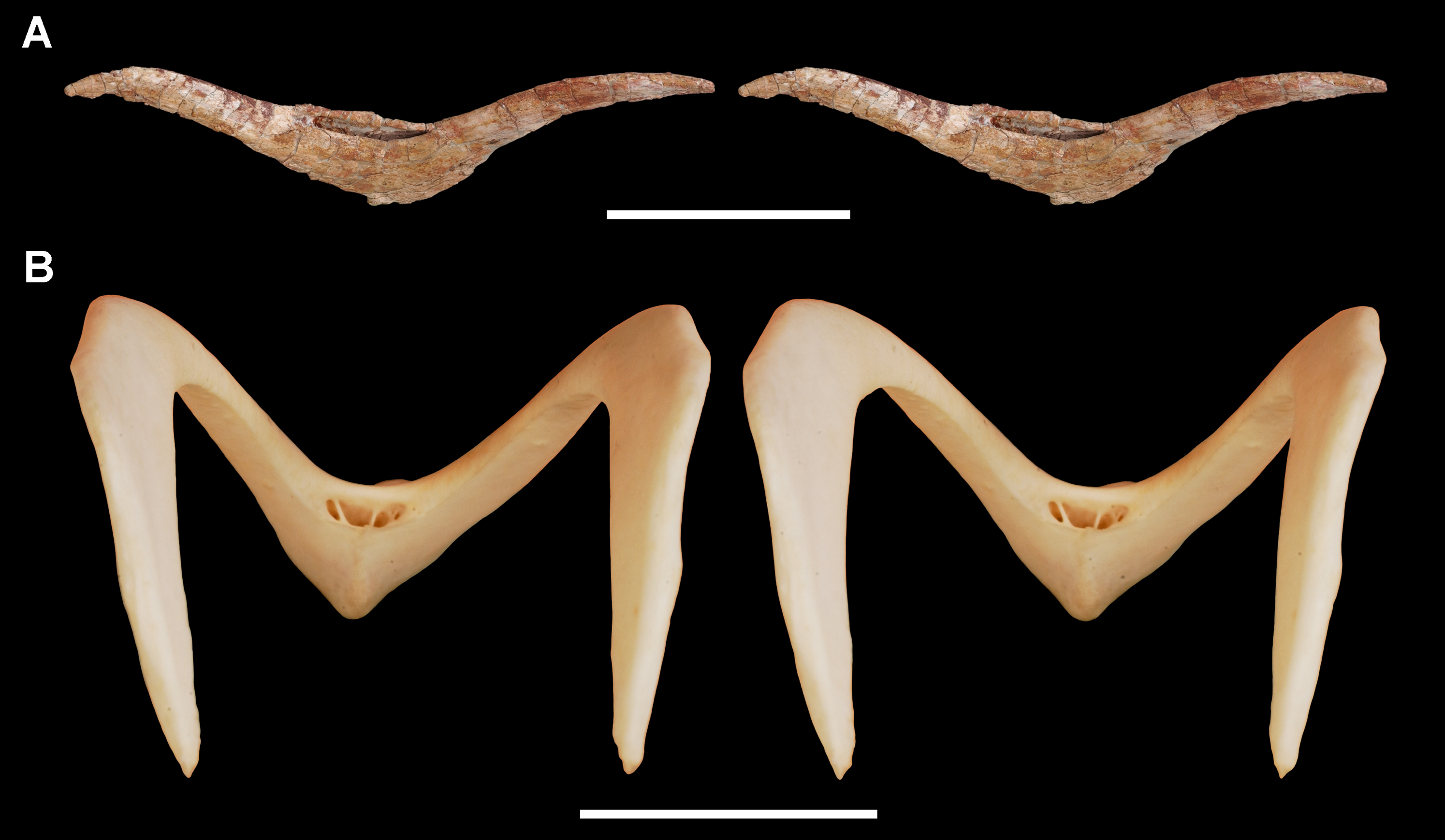
Stereo images of the furculae of A. riocoloradensis (A) and the Magpie-goose, Anseranas semipalmata (B). Scale bars are 10 cm in (A) and 2 cm in (B).

Some of Aerosteon's bones show pneumatization (air-filled spaces), including pneumatic hollowing of the furcula and ilium, and pneumatization of several gastralia. The addition of pneumatization throughout the bones of Aerosteon shows the evolutionary progress of the avian air sacs, which first appear as features on the sides of vertebrae, before being incorporated within bones throughout the skeleton. These air sacs would have acted like bellows, moving air into and out of the animal's relatively inflexible lungs, instead of the lungs themselves being expanded and contracted as occurs with mammals. See avian respiratory system for more detailed information on this.

Sereno et al. theorize that this respiratory system may have developed to assist with regulating body temperature and was later co-opted for breathing.
