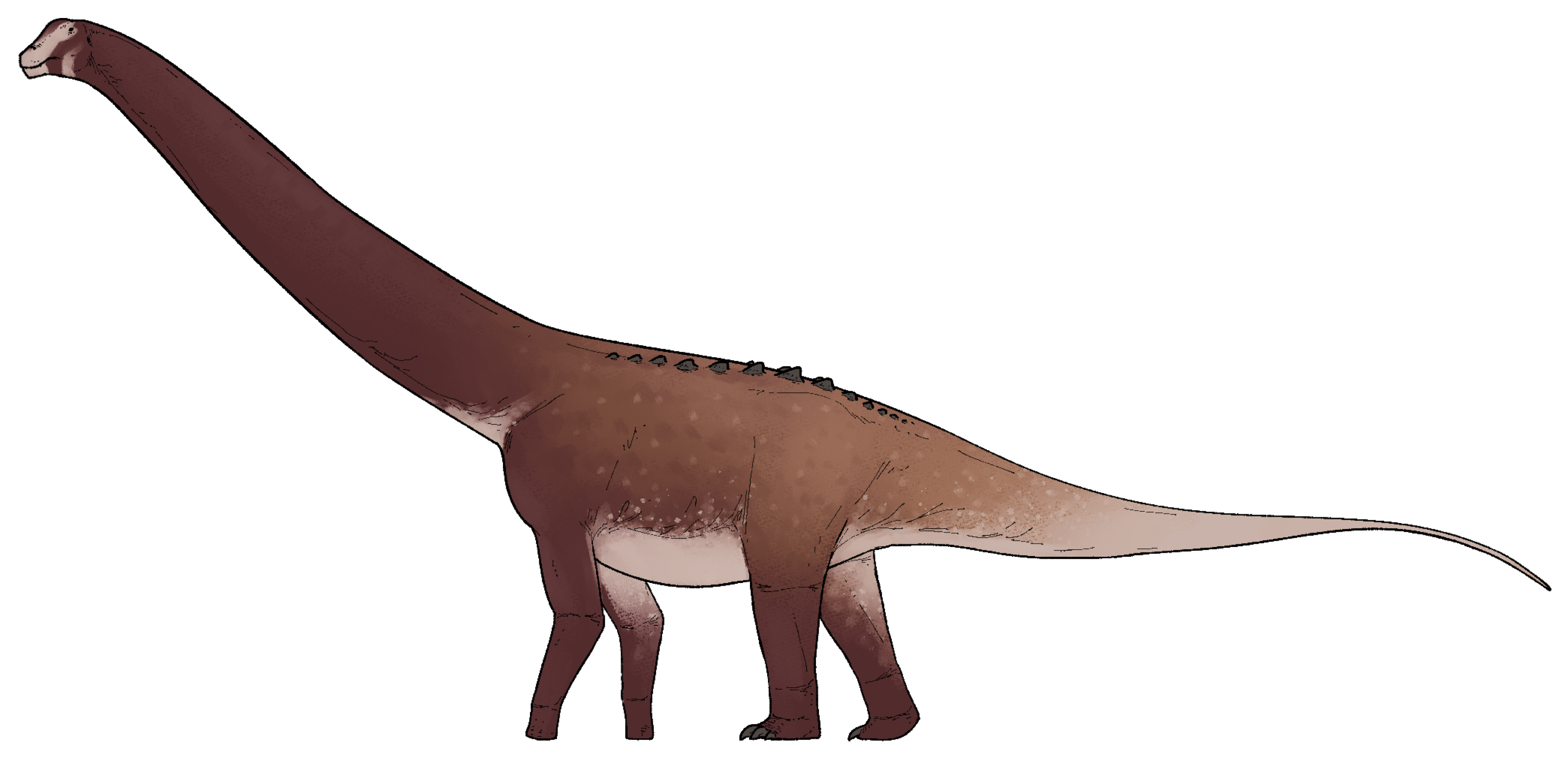
- Life restoration

Scientific classification
- Kingdom: Animalia
- Phylum: Chordata
- Class: Reptilia
- Clade: Dinosauria
- Clade: Saurischia
- Clade: †Sauropodomorpha
- Clade: †Sauropoda
- Clade: †Eusauropoda
- Clade: †Macronaria
- Clade: †Titanosauria
- Superfamily: †Saltasauroidea
- Genus: †Yeneen; Filippi et al., 2026
- Species: †Y. houssayi

Binomial name
- †Yeneen houssayi Filippi et al., 2026

= Yeneen =

Yeneen Temporal range: Late Cretaceous, Santonian

Genus of titanosaurian dinosaur

Yeneen is an extinct genus of titanosaurian sauropod dinosaur known from the Late Cretaceous (Santonian age) Bajo de la Carpa Formation of Argentina. The genus contains a single species, Yeneen houssayi, known from at least one partial skeleton. Its discovery highlights the diversity of titanosaurs in this formation, which also includes Bonitasaura, Inawentu, Overosaurus, Rinconsaurus, and Traukutitan.

== Discovery and naming ==
The Yeneen fossil material was discovered in outcrops at the 'La Invernada' site, part of the Bajo de la Carpa Formation (Neuquén Group) of Argentina. Three specimens were collected, which are housed in the Museo Municipal Argentino Urquiza. One specimen, permanently accessioned as MAU-Pv-LI-538/1–30 consists of a partial disarticulated skeleton, comprising six cervical, ten dorsal, and one caudal vertebrae, in addition to the sacrum articulated with both ilia, and several ribs. A second specimen found in association with MAU-Pv-LI-538 but belonging to an individual of a smaller size is a single right ilium, accessioned as MAU-Pv-LI-539. A third specimen, MAU-Pv-LI-731, includes disarticulated axial and appendicular bones and is still undergoing preparation to better study the skeletal anatomy.

In 2026, Leonardo S. Filippi and colleagues described Yeneen houssayi as a new genus and species of titanosaurian sauropod dinosaurs based on these fossil remains, establishing MAU-Pv-LI-538 as the holotype specimen. MAU-Pv-LI-539, the isolated ilium, was assigned to cf. Yeneen houssayi, meaning the researchers could not confidently assign it to this species based on anatomical characters shared with the holotype, but it still bears characters distinguishing it from other titanosaur taxa. MAU-Pv-LI-731 was not referred to Y. houssayi or any other taxon, pending the finalized preparation of the specimen.

The generic name, Yeneen, is the name of an entity in Tehuelche (Aonikenk) culture tied to the cold and winter weather. This name was chosen to reference the type locality, La Invernada, which is a Spanish word referring to the wintering location of cattle. The specific name, houssayi, honors Bernardo Alberto Houssay, a recipient of the Nobel Prize in Physiology or Medicine, who was involved in promoting the creation of the National Scientific and Technical Research Council (CONICET), an Argentinian agency that directs much of the academic scientific research performed in the country.

== Classification ==
To test the relationships and affinities of Yeneen with other titanosaurs, Filippi and colleagues developed a novel phylogenetic dataset modified from that of Filippi et al. (2024) (the description of the coeval Inawentu). These results placed Yeneen as part of the clade Saltasauroidea, in a more exclusive group the researchers referred to as "Clade A", where it diverges after Narambuenatitan but before Overosaurus. These results are displayed in the cladogram below, with contemporary genera from the Bajo de la Carpa Formation highlighted, indicating their positions throughout all of the titanosaur tree (Traukutitan not included):

- Titanosauria
  - Andesaurus
  - - Epachthosaurus
    - Eutitanosauria
      - Colossosauria
        - - Brasilotitan
          - - Antarctosaurus
            - Inawentu
        - Lognkosauria
          - - Mendozasaurus
            - Petrobrasaurus
          - - - Puertasaurus
              - - Futalognkosaurus
                - Quetecsaurus
            - - Bonitasaura
              - - Drusilasaura
                - - Patagotitan
                  - - Argentinosaurus
                    - Ninjatitan
      - Saltasauroidea
        - - Dreadnoughtus
          - - Bravasaurus
            - Lithostrotia
              ⊞
              - Malawisaurus
              - - Notocolossus
                - - Alamosaurus
                  - - Isisaurus
                    - - Rapetosaurus
                      - - Tapuiasaurus
                        - Saltasauridae
                          - Opisthocoelicaudia
                          - Saltasaurinae
                            - Neuquensaurus
                            - Saltasaurus
              ⊟
        - 'Clade A'
          - Narambuenatitan
          - - Yeneen
            - - Overosaurus
              - Aeolosaurini / Rinconsauria
                - - Trigonosaurus
                  - - Gondwanatitan
                    - - Pitekunsaurus
                      - Rinconsaurus
                - - Muyelensaurus
                  - - Uberabatitan
                    - - Aeolosaurus
                      - - Arrudatitan
                        - Punatitan

Bajo de la Carpa Fm. genera

== Paleoecology ==
Yeneen is known from the Bajo de la Carpa Formation, which dates to the Santonian age of the late Cretaceous period. Its sediments represent fluvial and aeolian systems, with a semi-arid paleoenvironment. In addition to Yeneen, several dinosaurs are known from this formation. Sauropods include the diverse fellow titanosaurs Bonitasaura, Inawentu, Overosaurus, Rinconsaurus, and Traukutitan. Theropods preserved comprise the megaraptorids (Rinconraptor and Tratayenia), abelisauroids (Velocisaurus, Llukalkan, and Viavenator), alvarezsaurids (Achillesaurus and Alvarezsaurus), the unenlagiine paravian Diuqin, and the avialans (birds, in the broad sense) Neuquenornis and Patagopteryx. Other reptiles include the elasmarian ornithopod dinosaur Mahuidacursor and various non-dinosaurs, including indeterminate pterosaurs and fossil snakes (Dinilysia), lizards (Paleochelco), turtles (Lomalatachelys), and several crocodyliforms.
