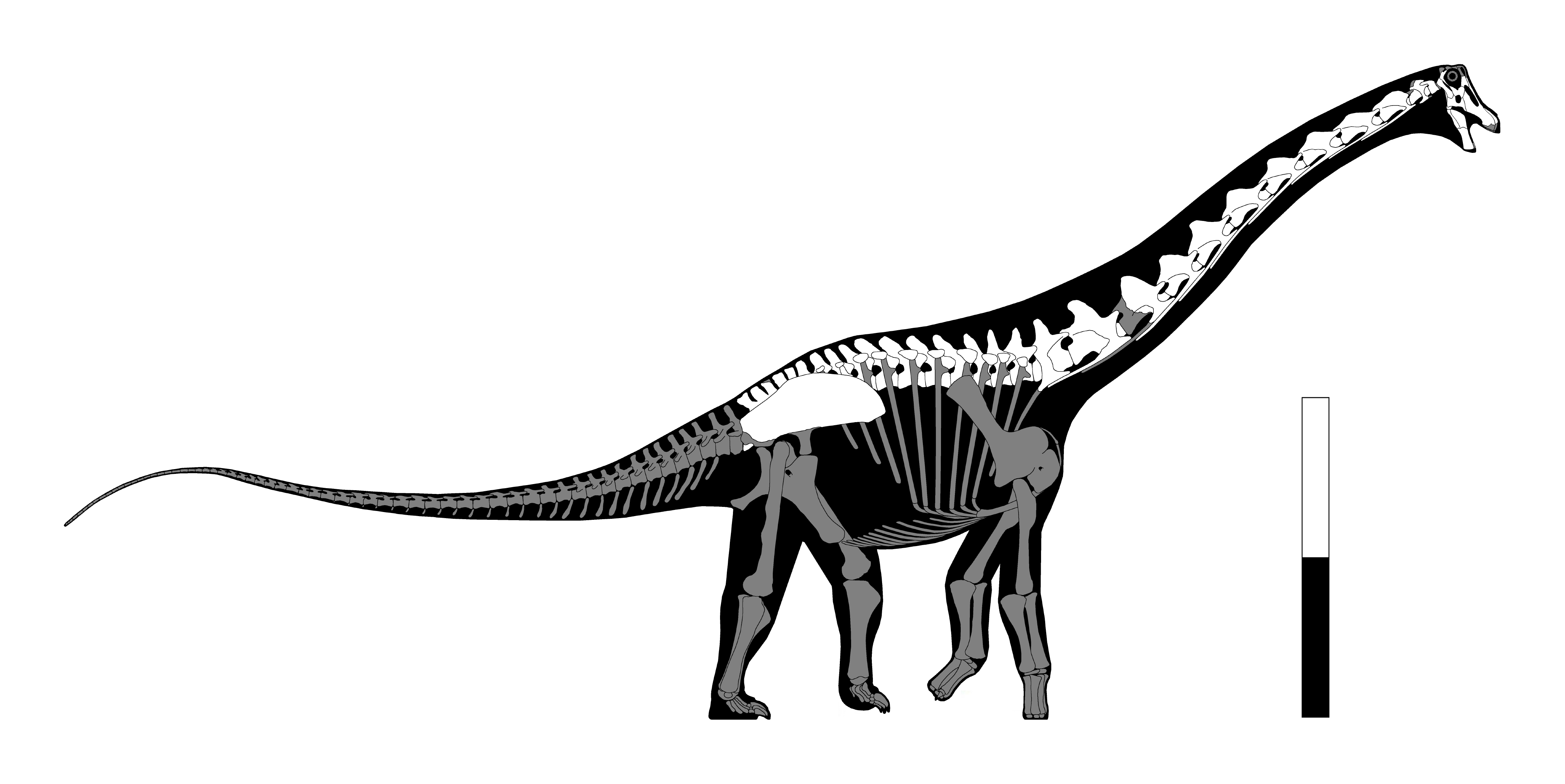
- Reconstructed skeleton

Scientific classification
- Kingdom: Animalia
- Phylum: Chordata
- Class: Reptilia
- Clade: Dinosauria
- Clade: Saurischia
- Clade: †Sauropodomorpha
- Clade: †Sauropoda
- Clade: †Eusauropoda
- Clade: †Macronaria
- Clade: †Titanosauria
- Clade: †Eutitanosauria
- Genus: †Inawentu; Filippi et al., 2024
- Species: †I. oslatus

Binomial name
- †Inawentu oslatus Filippi et al., 2024

= Inawentu =

Inawentu Temporal range: Late Cretaceous, Santonian

Genus of titanosaurian dinosaur

Inawentu (lit. 'imitator') is an extinct genus of titanosaurian sauropod dinosaur from the Late Cretaceous (Santonian age) Bajo de la Carpa Formation of Argentina. The genus contains a single species, Inawentu oslatus, known from a partial articulated skeleton including the skull. The square-shaped jaw of Inawentu demonstrates convergent characteristics with rebbachisaurids.

== Discovery and naming ==
The Inawentu holotype specimen, MAU-Pv-LI-595, was discovered in sediments of the Bajo de la Carpa Formation (Neuquén Group) near Rincón de los Sauces in Neuquén Province, Argentina. The specimen consists of a partial articulated skeleton, including a nearly complete skull, all of the vertebrae from the atlas to the end of the sacrum (comprising twelve cervical, ten dorsal, and six sacral vertebrae), and both ilia. MAU-Pv-LI-595 is one of the few known titanosaur specimens to preserve a complete neck.

In 2016, the find was presented at a conference in Argentina. In 2023, Filippi et al. announced Inawentu oslatus as a new genus and species of titanosaurian sauropod based on these fossil remains in a non-final preprint. The description was finalized the following year. The generic name, "Inawentu", is derived from a Mapundungun word meaning "mimic" or "imitator". The specific name, "oslatus", combines the Latin words "os", meaning "mouth", and "latus", meaning "broad".

== Description ==
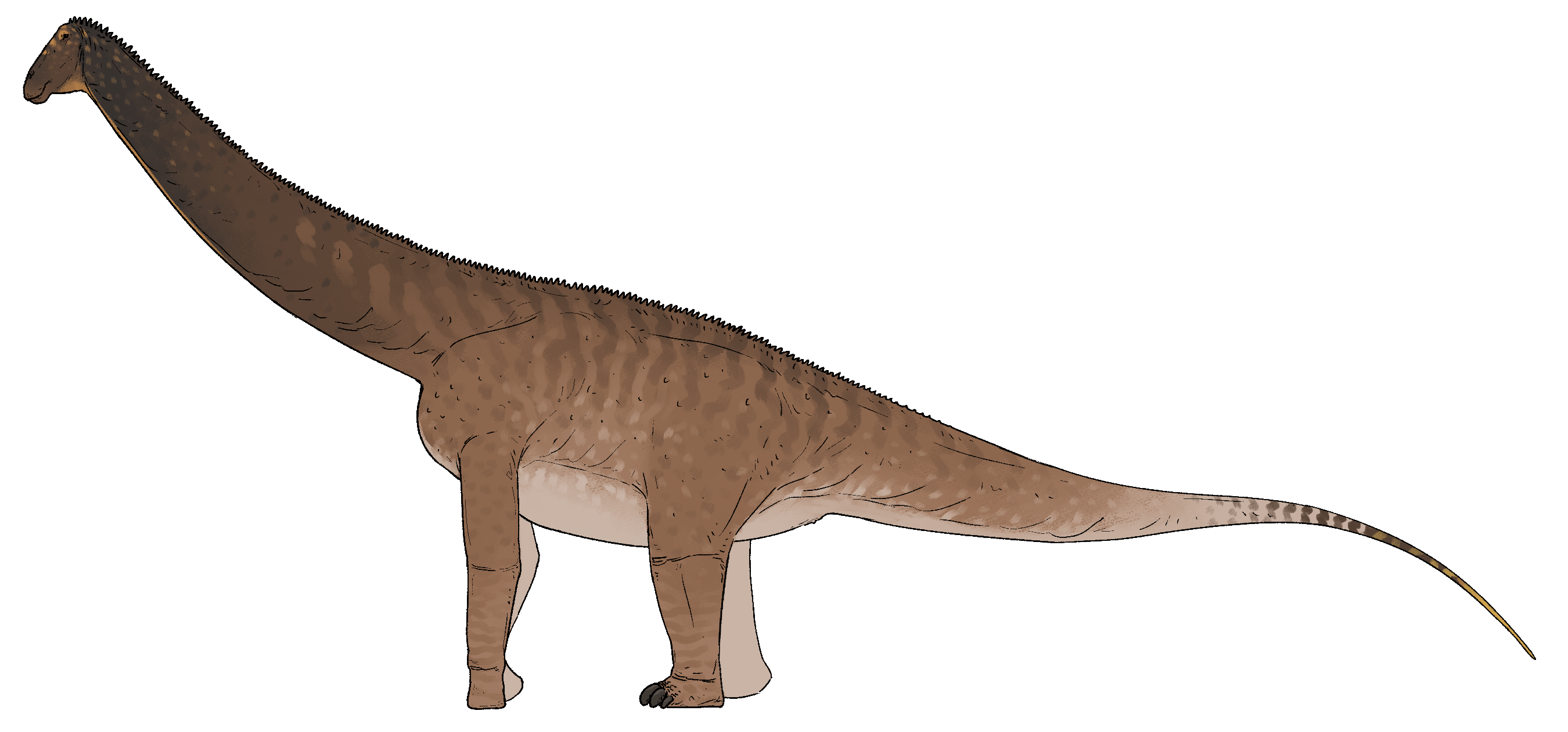
Life restoration

The skull of Inawentu showed several convergent similarities to rebbachisaurids such as Nigersaurus, such as a wide, squared-off snout that was deflected strongly downward. The neck of Inawentu consisted of only twelve vertebrae, fewer than in any other known titanosaur. MCT 1487-R, a specimen possibly referable to Uberabatitan, has thirteen, Futalognkosaurus has fourteen, and Rapetosaurus has seventeen. Thus, Inawentu may have had a proportionately shorter neck than most titanosaurs. The centra and neural arches of the neck and back vertebrae are highly modified, which suggests that the neck would have been capable of multidirectional movement. As in most titanosaurs, there were ten dorsal and six sacral vertebrae. The hips were narrower than in Saltasaurus and Neuquensaurus.

== Classification ==
Filippi et al. (2024) recovered Inawentu as the sister taxon to Antarctosaurus in a clade also containing the coeval Bonitasaura. This clade was found to be a member of a previously unrecognized clade of square-jawed eutitanosaurs, which the researchers referred to as "Clade A". Their results differ from those of many previous studies, which typically found a close relationship between lognkosaurs and rinconsaurs. However, similar results were previously reported by Gorscak and O'Connor in 2016. The results of this phylogenetic analysis are shown in Topology A below. In 2026, Filippi and colleagues described Yeneen, another titanosaur from the Bajo de la Carpa Formation. Using a novel phylogenetic matrix developed from their description of Inawentu, the researchers recovered a notably different arrangement of taxa, with Inawentu + Antarctosaurus as the sister to Brasilotitan, and this clade instead placed as a basal lineage of the Colossosauria (the clade including the Lognkosauria). Bonitasaura was recovered as a more derived lognkosaur, and Yeneen was instead placed within 'Clade A'. These results are displayed in Topology B below.

Topology A: Results of Filippi et al. (2024)

- Titanosauria
  - Andesaurus
  - Sarmientosaurus
  - Epachthosaurus
  - Eutitanosauria
    - Colossosauria
      - Notocolossus
      - Lognkosauria
    - Saltasauroidea
      - Lithostrotia
      - "Clade A"
        - Baalsaurus
        - - Bonitasaura
          - - Inawentu
            - Antarctosaurus
        - - Narambuenatitan
          - - - Uberabatitan
              - Brasilotitan
            - - Aeolosaurini
              - Rinconsauria

Topology B: Results of Filippi et al. (2026)

- Titanosauria
  - Andesaurus
  - - Epachthosaurus
    - Eutitanosauria
      - Colossosauria
        - - Brasilotitan
          - - Antarctosaurus
            - Inawentu
        - - Lognkosauria
      - Saltasauroidea
        - - Dreadnoughtus
          - - Bravasaurus
            - Lithostrotia
        - 'Clade A'
          - Narambuenatitan
          - - Yeneen
            - - Overosaurus
              - - Aeolosaurini
                - Rinconsauria

In their 2026 redescription of Muyelensaurus, Pérez Moreno et al. included Inawentu in an updated version of a matrix they had published in 2023. Under extended implied weights, Inawentu was recovered as the sister taxon to Narambuenatitan, with this clade as the sister to Aeolosaurini + Rinconsauria, which was instead placed in a derived position within Lognkosauria, contrasting with results by Filippi and colleagues. Under equal weights, Inawentu shifted to a position within Aeolosaurini alongside Gondwanatitan. This classification was replicated in the 2026 description of Mesetasaurus by Soto Núñez et al. (2026), who used this matrix and regarded Inawentu as a "probable aeolosaurine".

== Paleoecology ==
Inawentu is known from the Bajo de la Carpa Formation, which dates to the Santonian age of the late Cretaceous period. Its sediments represent fluvial and aeolian systems, with a semi-arid paleoenvironment. In addition to Inawentu, several dinosaurs are known from this formation. Sauropods include the diverse fellow titanosaurs Bonitasaura, Overosaurus, Rinconsaurus, Traukutitan, and Yeneen. Theropods preserved comprise the megaraptorids (Rinconraptor and Tratayenia), abelisauroids (Velocisaurus, Llukalkan, and Viavenator), alvarezsaurids (Achillesaurus and Alvarezsaurus), the unenlagiine paravian Diuqin, and the avialans (birds, in the broad sense) Neuquenornis and Patagopteryx. Other reptiles include the elasmarian ornithopod dinosaur Mahuidacursor and various non-dinosaurs, including indeterminate pterosaurs and fossil snakes (Dinilysia), lizards (Paleochelco), turtles (Lomalatachelys), and several crocodyliforms.
