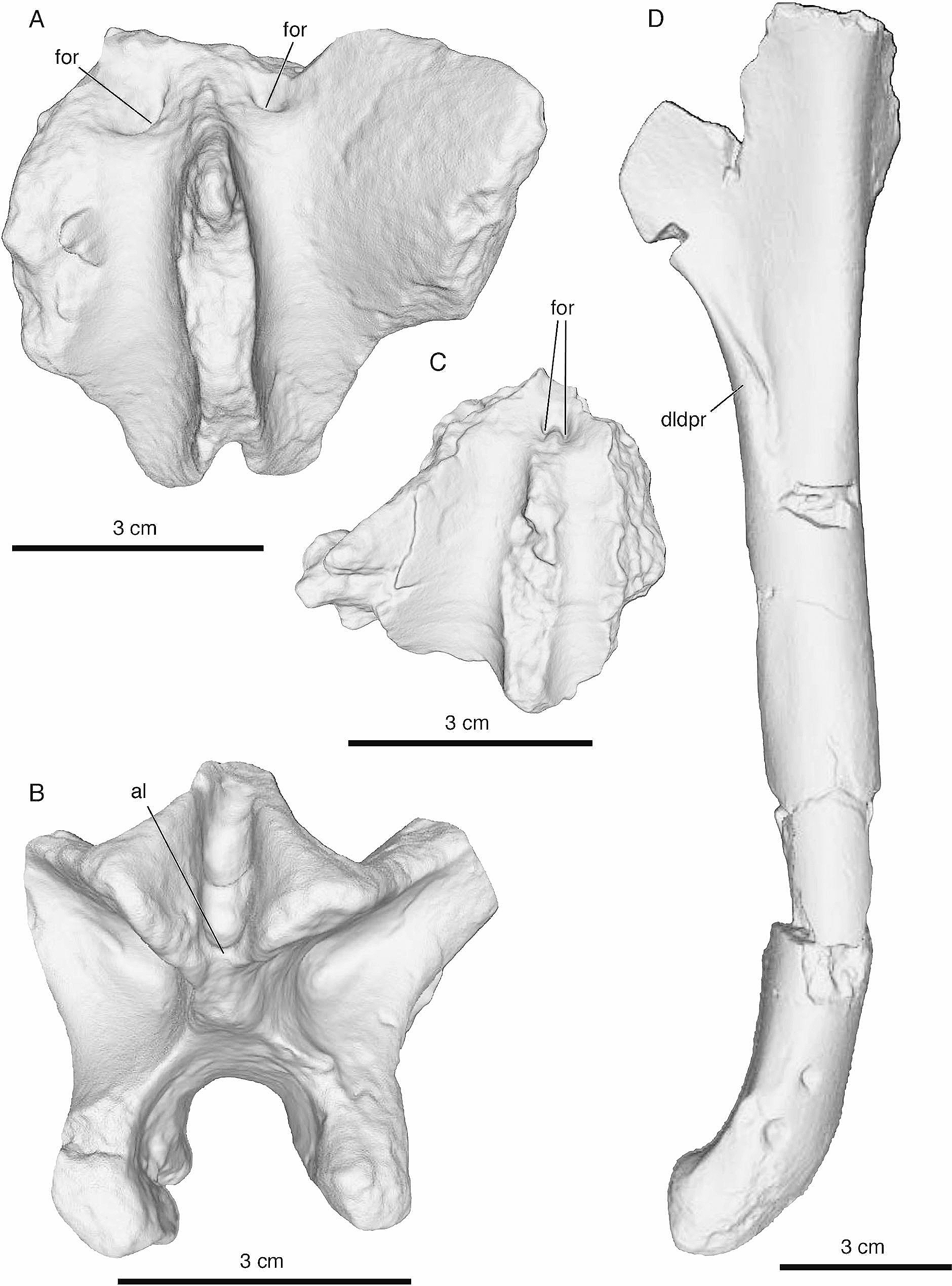
- 3D scans of the holotype specimen

Scientific classification
- Kingdom: Animalia
- Phylum: Chordata
- Class: Reptilia
- Clade: Dinosauria
- Clade: Saurischia
- Clade: Theropoda
- Subfamily: †Unenlagiinae
- Genus: †Diuqin; Porfiri et al., 2024
- Species: †D. lechiguanae

Binomial name
- †Diuqin lechiguanae Porfiri et al., 2024

= Diuqin =

Diuqin Temporal range: Late Cretaceous, Santonian

Extinct genus of unenlagiine theropod

Diuqin (meaning "bird of prey") is an extinct genus of unenlagiine theropod dinosaurs from the Late Cretaceous (Santonian) Bajo de la Carpa Formation of Argentina. The genus contains a single species, Diuqin lechiguanae, known from a humerus and fragmentary vertebrae.

== Discovery and naming ==
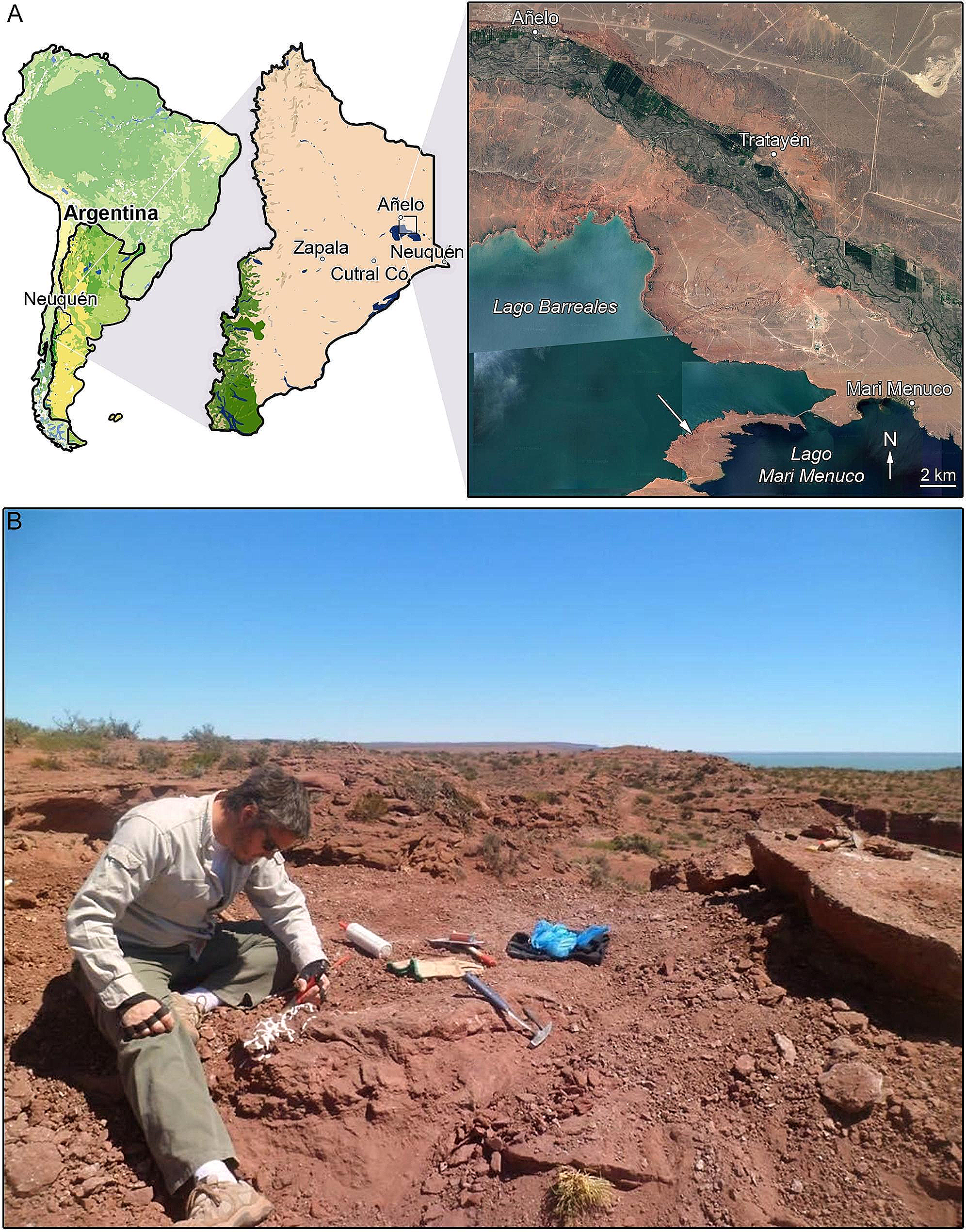
Type locality of Diuqin

The Diuqin holotype specimen, MUCPv 1401, was discovered in sediments of the Bajo de la Carpa Formation in Neuquén Province of Argentinian Patagonia. The specimen consists of most of the left humerus and pieces of a sacral and caudal vertebra, and other possibly vertebral fragments.

It was described as a new genus and species of unenlagiine theropod in 2024. The generic name, Diuqin, is Mapudungun for "bird of prey". The specific name, lechiguanae, refers to Lechiguana, the witch in the 1975 Argentine film Nazareno Cruz y Lobo.

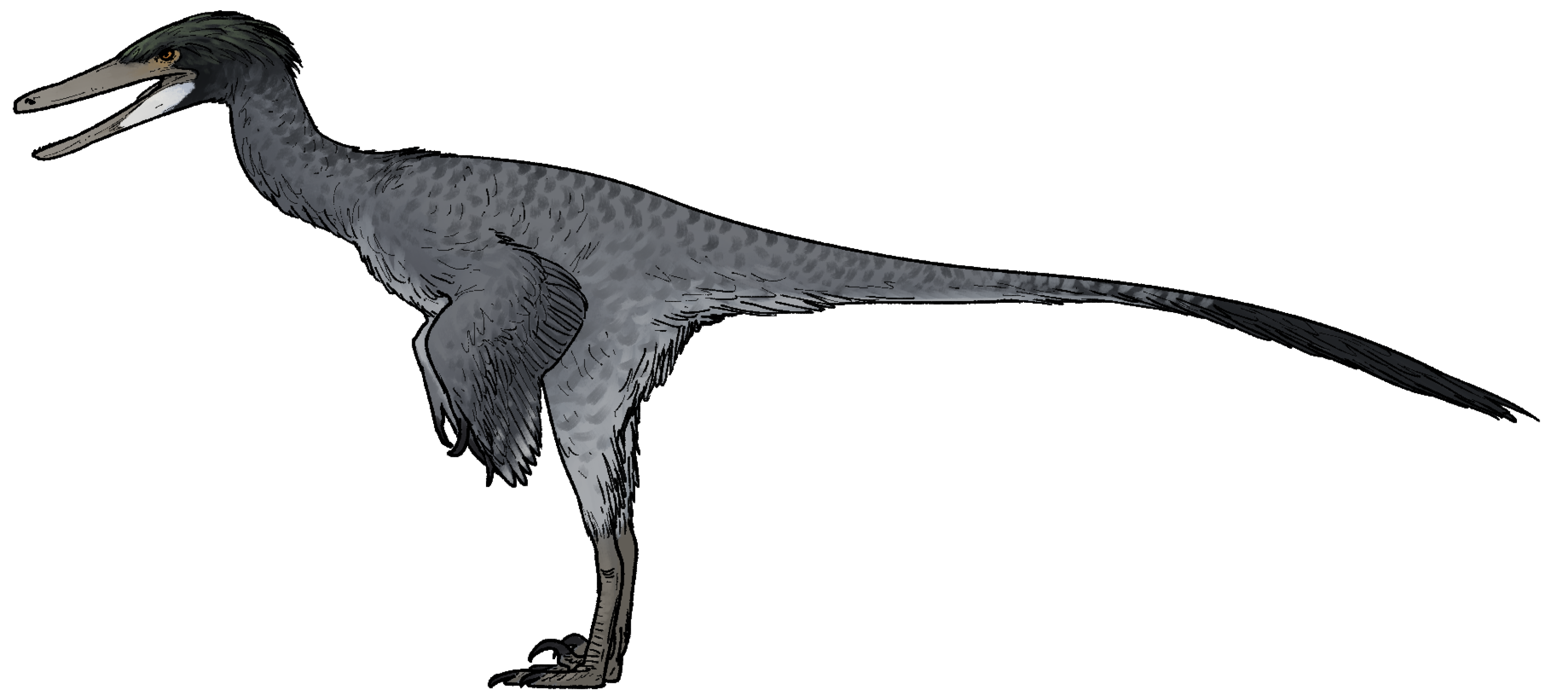
Life restoration

Diuqin represents the first unenlagiine described from the Bajo de la Carpa Formation. Its discovery helps to fill in a gap of at least 15 million years in the fossil record of this clade between Austroraptor (Allen Formation) and taxa like Unenlagia (Portezuelo Formation).

== Classification ==
Diquin was scored in a phylogenetic analysis and found in a large polytomy of maniraptoriforms. It had to be pruned from the analysis to recover better resolution in the tree. Doing this suggested possible close relationships to any of the tested unenlagiines.

== Paleoenvironment ==
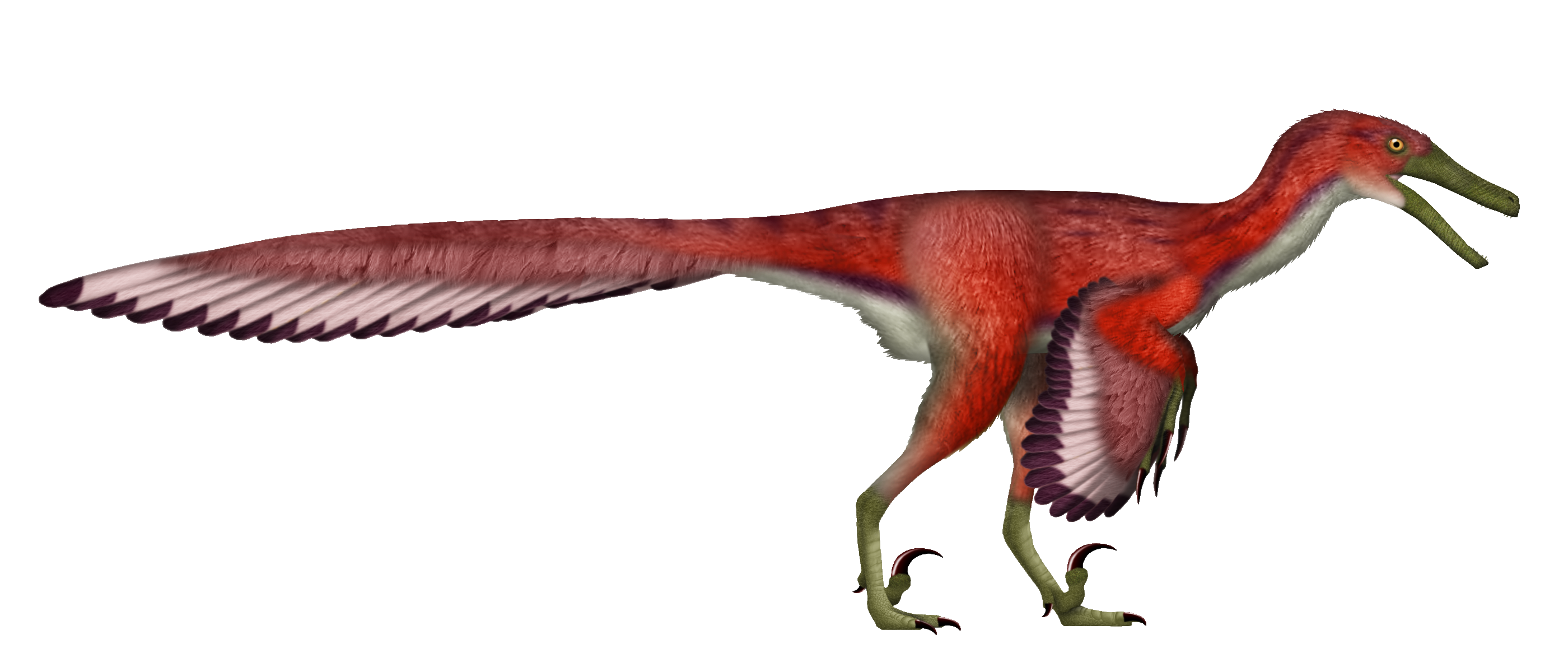
Life restoration

Diuqin is known from the Bajo de la Carpa Formation, which dates to the Santonian age of the late Cretaceous period. Its depositional environment was likely warm and semiarid. Many other dinosaurs are known from the formation, including several other non-avian theropods (the alvarezsauroids Alvarezsaurus and Achillesaurus, the abelisaurs Velocisaurus, Viavenator, and Llukalkan, and the megaraptoran Tratayenia), many titanosaurian sauropods (Bonitasaura, Inawentu, Overosaurus, Rinconsaurus, and Traukutitan), birds (Neuquenornis, Patagopteryx, and some eggs and nests), the ornithopod Mahuidacursor, and an indeterminate ankylosaur. Other animals include snakes (Dinilysia), lizards (Paleochelco), turtles (Lomalatachelys), crocodyliforms (Comahuesuchus brachybuccalis, Cynodontosuchus, Gasparinisuchus, Kinesuchus, Microsuchus, Neuquensuchus, Notosuchus, and Wargosuchus), and indeterminate pterosaurs.
