= Río Colorado Subgroup =

Geologic subgroup in Argentina

- Stratigraphic range: Santonian-Early Campanian; ~86–79 Ma
- Type: Subgroup
- Unit of: Neuquén Group
- Sub-units: Anacleto & Bajo de la Carpa Formations
- Underlies: Malargüe Group; Allen Formation
- Overlies: Río Neuquén Subgroup; Plottier Formation
- Thickness: Up to 240 m (790 ft)

Lithology
- Primary: Mudstone, sandstone
- Other: Siltstone, limestone

Location
- Coordinates: 37.9°S 68.5°W
- Approximate paleocoordinates: 40.8°S 53.0°W
- Region: Neuquén & Río Negro Provinces
- Country: Argentina
- Extent: Neuquén Basin
- Río Colorado Subgroup (Argentina)

The Río Colorado Subgroup, formerly named as Río Colorado Formation, is a Late Cretaceous (Santonian to Early Campanian) geologic subgroup of the Neuquén Basin in northern Patagonia, Argentina. It belongs to the Neuquén Group and contains the Anacleto and Bajo de la Carpa Formations. The subgroup overlies the Río Neuquén Subgroup and is overlain by the Allen Formation of the Malargüe Group, separated by an unconformity dated to 79 Ma. Dinosaur remains diagnostic to the genus level are among the fossils that have been recovered from the formation.

== Fossil content ==
=== Ornithischians ===
Ornithischians reported from the Río Colorado Subgroup
Genus	Species	Province	Stratigraphic position	Material	Notes	Images
Gasparinisaura	G. cincosaltensis	Río Negro Province	Anacleto Formation	"Skull and postcranial skeleton, postcranial elements, juvenile to subadult."		Gasparinisaura

=== Sauropods ===
Titanosaur eggs are known from Neuquén Province.

Sauropods reported from the Río Colorado Subgroup
Genus	Species	Province	Stratigraphic position	Material	Notes	Images
Antarctosaurus	A. wichmannianus	Río Negro Province	Anacleto Formation			Antarctosaurus Bonatitan Neuquensaurus
Bonatitan	B.reigi	Río Negro Province	Allen Formation			Antarctosaurus Bonatitan Neuquensaurus
Loricosaurus	L. scutatus	Neuquén Province; Río Negro Province				Antarctosaurus Bonatitan Neuquensaurus
Microcoelus	M. patagonicus	Neuquén Province	Bajo de la Carpa Formation		Possible synonym of Neuquensaurus	Antarctosaurus Bonatitan Neuquensaurus
Neuquensaurus	N. australis	Neuquén Province; Río Negro Province	Anacleto Formation			Antarctosaurus Bonatitan Neuquensaurus
"Titanosaurus"	"T." robustus	Río Negro Province	Anacleto Formation			Antarctosaurus Bonatitan Neuquensaurus
Titanosaurus	T. nanus	Neuquén Province	Bajo de la Carpa Formation			Antarctosaurus Bonatitan Neuquensaurus

=== Theropods ===
Theropods reported from the Río Colorado Subgroup
Genus	Species	Province	Stratigraphic position	Material	Notes	Images
Abelisaurus	A. comahuaensis	Río Negro Province	Anacleto Formation	"Partial skull."		Abelisaurus Alvarezsaurus Aucasaurus Patagopteryx Velocisaurus
Alvarezsaurus	A. calvoi	Neuquén Province	Bajo de la Carpa Formation	"Partial postcranial skeleton."		Abelisaurus Alvarezsaurus Aucasaurus Patagopteryx Velocisaurus
Aucasaurus	A. garridoi	Neuquén Province	Anacleto Formation	"Nearly complete skeleton."		Abelisaurus Alvarezsaurus Aucasaurus Patagopteryx Velocisaurus
Neuquenornis	N. volans	Neuquén Province	Bajo de la Carpa Formation	"Partial skeleton."		Abelisaurus Alvarezsaurus Aucasaurus Patagopteryx Velocisaurus
Patagopteryx	P. deferrariisi	Neuquén Province	Bajo de la Carpa Formation	"Many skeletons."		Abelisaurus Alvarezsaurus Aucasaurus Patagopteryx Velocisaurus
Velocisaurus	V. unicus	Neuquén Province	Bajo de la Carpa Formation	"Partial hind limb."		Abelisaurus Alvarezsaurus Aucasaurus Patagopteryx Velocisaurus

== See also ==
- List of stratigraphic units with dinosaur body fossils
- List of stratigraphic units with dinosaur trace fossils
