= Plottier Formation =

Geologic formation in Argentina

- Stratigraphic range: late Coniacian-early Santonian; ~86–85 Ma
- Type: Geological formation
- Unit of: Neuquén Group; Río Neuquén Subgroup
- Underlies: Río Colorado Subgroup; Bajo de la Carpa Formation
- Overlies: Sierra Barrosa Formation
- Thickness: Up to 25 m (82 ft)

Lithology
- Primary: Claystone
- Other: Sandstone

Location
- Coordinates: 37.4°S 69.1°W
- Approximate paleocoordinates: 42.2°S 49.4°W
- Region: Mendoza, Neuquén & Río Negro Provinces
- Country: Argentina
- Extent: Neuquén Basin

Type section
- Named for: Plottier
- Named by: Fossa Mancini et al.
- Year defined: 1938
- Plottier Formation (Argentina)

The Plottier Formation is a geologic formation that outcrops in the Argentine Patagonian provinces of Río Negro and Neuquén. It is the younger of two formations belonging to the Río Neuquén Subgroup within the Neuquén Group of the Neuquén Basin, with the oldest rocks dating from the late Coniacian and its youngest maybe from the very start of the Santonian. Formerly, that subgroup was treated as a formation, and the Plottier Formation was known as the Plottier Member.

== Description ==
A section near the Neuquén City airport, north of the town of Plottier, is the type locality of the Plottier Formation. At its base, this formation grades into the Portezuelo Formation, and it is in turn overlain conformably by the Bajo de la Carpa Formation, a unit of the Río Colorado Subgroup.

The Plottier Formation is the thinnest formation within the Neuquén Group, with a maximum thickness of only 25 metres (82 ft). It is differentiated from the underlying Portezuelo Formation primarily by its higher content of argillites (mud deposits) and was deposited under fluvial conditions. In 2006, a detailed lithostratigraphic and paleoecological study of a section of the Plottier Formation was published. This section contained alluvial deposits laid down by what was essentially a low-gradient wandering river throughout the millions of years, but often was of a single-channel type with little meandering.

== Fossil content ==
Color key: Taxon / Reclassified taxon / Taxon falsely reported as present / Dubious taxon or junior synonym / Ichnotaxon / Ootaxon / Morphotaxon

Notes
Uncertain or tentative taxa are in small text
~~crossed out~~ taxa are discredited.

Few animal fossils are known from this formation, including:

=== Crocodyliformes ===
Crocodyliformes reported from the Plottier Formation
Genus	Species	Presence	Material	Notes	Images
Crocodyliformes indet.	Indeterminate	El Anfiteatro	Seven osteoderms (MPCA-AT 251–257); Right dentary fragment (MPCA-AT 75)	Resembles peirosaurids such as Peirosaurus and Uberabasuchus	
Lomasuchus	L. palpebrosus	Embalse Cerros Colorados	Skull and partial mandibular ramus	A peirosaurid, specimen originally claimed to originate from the Rio Colorado formation.	
Mesoeucrocodylia indet.	Indeterminate	Yacimiento Narambuena	Partial skeleton (MAU-PV-N-280)	Subadult specimen showing both derived and primitive traits	
Peirosauridae indet.	Indeterminate	Puesto Hernández	Partial skeleton (MAU-Pv-PH-437)	A peirosaurid	

=== Dinosaurs ===
==== Ornithischians ====
A footprint track of an ornithopod is known from the Middle Loma de la Lata site.

Ornithischians reported from the Plottier Formation
Genus	Species	Presence	Material	Notes	Images
Ornithopoda indet.	Indeterminate	El Anfiteatro	A pedal ungual phalanx (MPCA-AT 261)	An ornithopod roughly the size of Notohypsilophodon	
Ornithopoda indet.	Indeterminate	Puesto Hernández quarry	Partial dorsal neural arch (MAU-Pv-PH-458)	An ornithopod similar to Macrogryphosaurus, estimated to be 6 meters long	

==== Sauropods ====
12 footprint tracks of a sauropod are known from the site of Proyecto Dino.

Sauropods reported from the Plottier Formation
Genus	Species	Presence	Material	Notes	Images
Aeolosaurini indet.	Indeterminate	Yacimiento Narambuena	Four articulated caudal vertebrae (MAU-Pv-N-414)	A titanosaur	
Antarctosaurus	A. giganteus	Aguada del Caño	Partial skeleton (MLP 26-316)	A titanosaur	
Muyelensaurus	M. pecheni	Loma del Lindero	Partial skeleton & additional vertebrae	A titanosaur, specimens originally thought to be from the Portezuelo Formation	
Notocolossus	N. gonzalezparejasi	Cerro Guillermo	Two partial skeletons (UNCUYO-LD 301 & UNCUYO-LD 302)	A titanosaur	
Petrobrasaurus	P. puestohernandezi	Rincón de los Sauces	Partial skeleton	A titanosaur	
Sauropoda indet.	Indeterminate	5 kilometers north of Plottier	Partial right tibia (MCF-PVPH-899)	A sauropod	
Sauropoda indet.	Indeterminate	Cerro Guillermo	Incomplete skeleton (IANIGLA-PV.113)	A sauropod	
Titanosauria indet.	Indeterminate	El Anfiteatro	Incomplete dorsal vertebra (MPCA-AT 024)	A large titanosaur	
Titanosauria indet.	Indeterminate	5 kilometers north of Plottier	Left femur and partial ribs (MCF-PVPH-889); Right fibula (MCF-PVPH-900)	Remains of titanosaurs	

==== Theropods ====
Theropods reported from the Plottier Formation
Genus	Species	Presence	Material	Notes	Images
Abelisauridae indet.	Indeterminate	Cañadon Amarillo	Tooth	An abelisaur tooth formerly thought to be part of the holotype specimen of Aerosteon	
Abelisauridae indet.	Indeterminate	El Anfiteatro	Tooth (Endemas-PV 16)	An abelisaur, tooth originally reported as that of a carcharodontosaurid in 2009 but reclassified in 2021	
Alvarezsauria indet.	Indeterminate	Rincón de los Sauces	Right femur (MAU-Pv-PH-453)	An alvarezsaur	
Brachyrostra indet.	Indeterminate	Loma del Lindero	Vertebrae, teeth and possible sacrum (MAU-Pv-LL-75)	An abelisaur	
Coelurosauria indet.	Indeterminate	El Anfiteatro	Two teeth (MPCA-AT 263 & 269)	A coelurosaur	
Maniraptoriformes indet. cf. Unenlagiinae	Indeterminate	El Anfiteatro	Tooth (Endemas-PV 15)	Possible unenlagiine tooth, though more material is needed to confirm this	
Theropoda indet.	Indeterminate	El Anfiteatro	Incomplete caudal vertebra (MPCA-AT 082)	A "moderately sized" theropod	

=== Pterosaurs ===
Pterosaurs reported from the Plottier Formation
Genus	Species	Presence	Material	Notes	Images
Thanatosdrakon	T. amaru	Agua del Padrillo	Partial skeleton (UNCUYO-LD 307); Left humerus (UNCUYO-LD 350)	An azhdarchid	

=== Turtles ===
Turtles reported from the Plottier Formation
Genus	Species	Presence	Material	Notes	Images
Chelidae? indet.	Indeterminate	El Anfiteatro	Plastron plate (MPCA-AT 089)	A chelid	
Linderochelys	L. rinconensis	Loma de Lindero	Partial skeleton (MAU-PV-LL-69)	A chelid, locality originally assigned to the Rio Neuquén Subgroup with no specific formation.	
Rionegrochelys	R. caldieroi	El Anfiteatro	Shell elements	A chelid, type specimen first reported as an indeterminate chelid in 2009	

=== Ichnofossils ===
- Scoyenia sp.
- Taenidium sp.

There are also ichnofossils left on the river's mudflats, as well as fossil freshwater bivalves.

=== Ostracods ===
Ostracods reported from the Plottier Formation
Genus	Species	Presence	Material	Notes	Images
Cypridoidea indet.	Indeterminate	Zampal	A few specimens	A cypridoid	
Ilyocypris	I. aff. bauruensis	Zampal	A few molts	An ilyocypridid	
Ilyocypris	I. cf. riograndensis	Zampal		An ilyocypridid	
Ilyocypris	I. wichmanni	Zampal		An ilyocypridid	
Neocyprideis	N.? sp.	Zampal		An ilyocypridid	
Neocyprideis	N. zampalensis	Babilonia	4 valves	An ilyocypridid	
Neuquenocypris	N. calfucurensis	Babilonia	3 valve fragments	An ilyocypridid	
Neuquenocypris	N. cf. minor	Zampal		An ilyocypridid	
Neuquenocypris	N. nahuelniyuensis	Babilonia	6 valves	An ilyocypridid	
Neuquenocypris	N. tenuipunctata	Babilonia	5 adult and 3 juvenile valves	An ilyocypridid	
Paralimnocythere	P.? sp.	Zampal	Several carapaces and valves	A limnocytherid	
Talicyprideinae sp.	Indeterminate	Zampal	Very scarce number of carapaces	An ilyocypridid	
Vecticypris	V. sp.	Babilonia	2 valves	A limnocytherid	
Wolburgiopsis	W. cf. neocretacea	Zampal		A limnocytherid	

=== Plants ===
Plants reported from the Plottier Formation
Genus	Species	Presence	Material	Notes	Images
Angiospermae? indet.	Indeterminate	Zampal	A few seeds	A possible angiosperm	
Henrisporites	H. sp.	Zampal	Abundant megaspores	A lycopod	
Lychnothamnus	L. barbosai	Zampal	Over 400 microfossils	A stonewort	
Nitella	N. sp.	Zampal	21 microfossils	A stonewort	
Spermatites	S. sp. 1	Zampal	Seeds	An angiosperm	
Spermatites	S. sp. 2	Zampal	Seeds	An angiosperm	

== See also ==
- List of fossil sites
- List of dinosaur bearing rock formations
