= Bajo de la Carpa Formation =

Geological formation in Argentina

- Stratigraphic range: Mid-Late Santonian; ~86–83 Ma
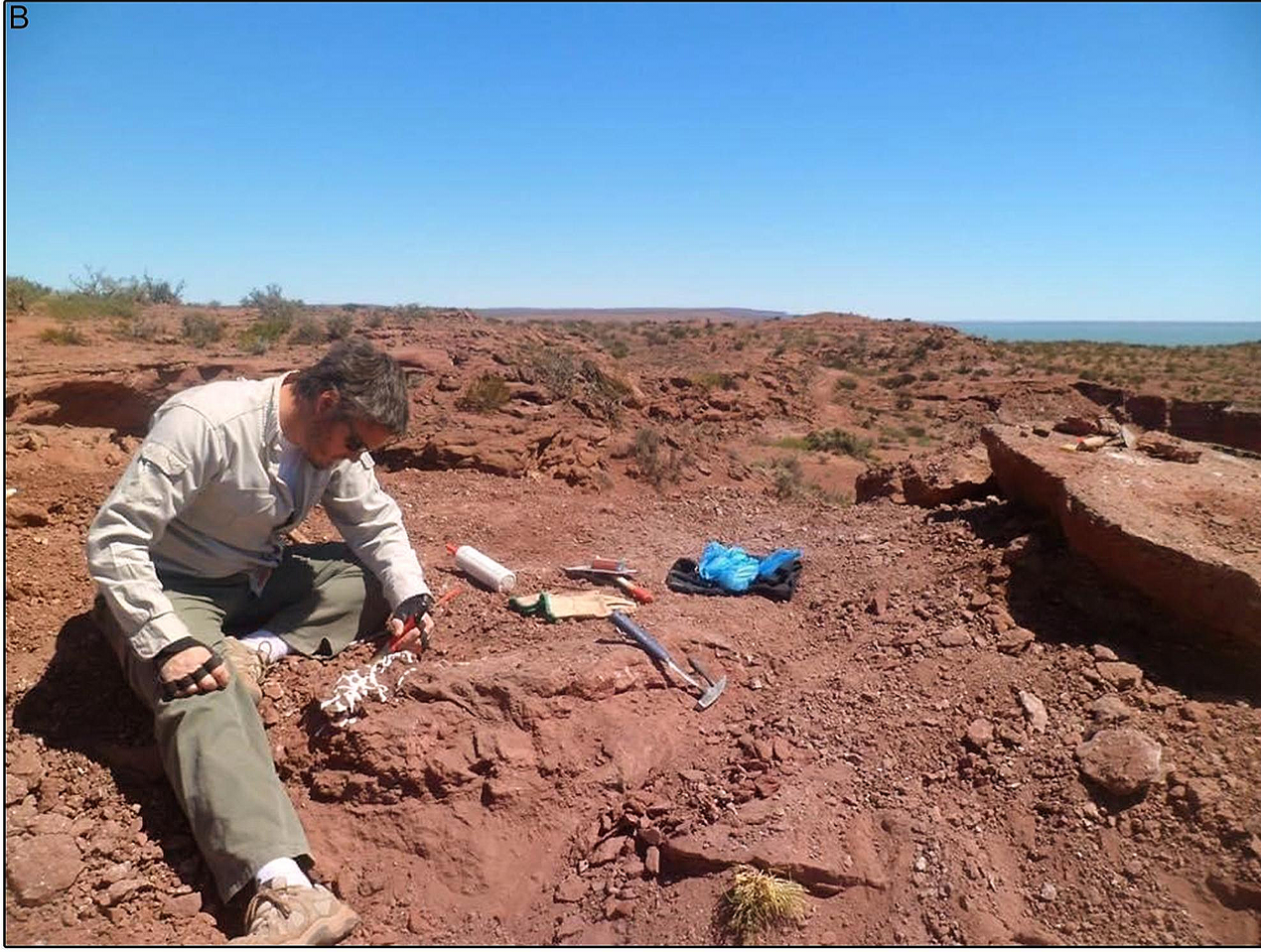
- Juan D. Porfiri excavating the holotype of Diuqin lechiguanae from the Bajo de la Carpa Formation
- Type: Geological formation
- Unit of: Neuquén Group; Río Colorado Subgroup
- Underlies: Anacleto Formation
- Overlies: Río Neuquén Subgroup; Plottier Formation
- Thickness: Up to 150 m (490 ft)

Lithology
- Primary: Sandstone
- Other: Mudstone, siltstone, paleosol

Location
- Coordinates: 38.8°S 68.8°W
- Approximate paleocoordinates: 43.4°S 49.8°W
- Region: Neuquén & Río Negro Provinces
- Country: Argentina
- Extent: Neuquén Basin
- Bajo de la Carpa Formation (Argentina)

The Bajo de la Carpa Formation is a geologic formation of the Neuquén Basin that crops out in northern Patagonia, in the provinces of Río Negro and Neuquén, Argentina. It is the oldest of two formations belonging to the Río Colorado Subgroup within the Neuquén Group. Formerly, that subgroup was treated as a formation, and the Bajo de la Carpa Formation was known as the Bajo de la Carpa Member.

At its base, this formation conformably overlies the Plottier Formation of the older Río Neuquén Subgroup, and it is in turn overlain by the Anacleto Formation, the youngest and uppermost formation of the Neuquén Group.

The Bajo de la Carpa Formation can reach 150 metres (490 ft) in thickness in some locations, and consists mainly of sandstones of various colors, all of fluvial origin, with thin layers of mudstone and siltstone in between. Geological features such as geodes, chemical nodules, impressions of raindrops, and paleosols (fossil soils) are commonly found in this formation as well.

== Fossil content ==
Small nests with eggs inside, found in this formation, probably belonged to the bird Neuquenornis. Fossil wasp nests have also been found in these rocks.

=== Fish ===
Fish reported from the Bajo de la Carpa Formation
Genus	Species	Location	Stratigraphic position	Material	Notes	Images
Rinconodus	R. salvadori				A ceratodontid lungfish	

=== Reptiles ===
==== Crocodylomorphs ====
Crocodylomorphs reported from the Bajo de la Carpa Formation
Genus	Species	Location	Stratigraphic position	Material	Notes	Images
Barrosasuchus	B. neuquenianus	Sierra Barrosa	Upper	A skull articulated with the remaining skeleton, which consisted of both forelimbs, most of the vertebral column up to the sacra, one hindlimb, and semi-articulate osteoderms that obscured parts of the fossil	A peirosaurid notosuchian	
Comahuesuchus	C. brachybuccalis	Universidad Nacional del Comahue	Upper	A holotype specimen	A comahuesuchid notosuchian	
Cynodontosuchus	C. rothi				A baurusuchid notosuchian	
Gasparinisuchus	G. peirosauroides	Loma de la Lata	Upper	A partial skull, lower jaws, and various associated postcranial remains	A peirosaurid notosuchian	
Kinesuchus	K. overoi	Cerro Overo	Upper	A partial mandible	An itasuchid notosuchian	
Lomasuchus	L. palpebrosus				A peirosaurid notosuchian	
Neuquensuchus	N. universitas	Universidad Nacional del Comahue	Upper	Paratype specimens consist of a partially articulated partial postcranial skeleton and left leg bone.	A crocodyliform of uncertain placement	
Notosuchus	N. lepidus				A notosuchid notosuchian	
Notosuchus	N. terrestris				A notosuchid notosuchian	
Peirosaurus	P. torminni			A fragmentary skull and a partial postcranial skeleton.	A peirosaurid notosuchian	
Wargosuchus	W. australis	Northern region of the Neuquén city		A partial right premaxilla and maxilla, and partial skull roof.	A pissarrachampsine baurusuchis	

==== Ornithischians ====
Ornithischians reported from the Bajo de la Carpa Formation
Genus	Species	Location	Stratigraphic position	Material	Notes	Images
Ankylosauria	Indetermidate					
Iguanodontia	Indetermidate	Cerro Overo		A femur	An early juvenile iguanodontian of uncertain affinities, possibly a Rhabdodontomorph.	
Mahuidacursor	M. lipanglef	Cerro Overo	Upper	A set of postcrania	An elasmarian	

==== Sauropods ====
Sauropods reported from the Bajo de la Carpa Formation
Genus	Species	Location	Stratigraphic position	Material	Notes	Images
Bonitasaura	B. salgadoi			A partial sub-adult skeleton with a lower jaw, a partial vertebrae series, and limb bones.	A titanosaur	
Inawentu	I. oslatus	Rincón de los Sauces		A partially articulated skeleton, including a nearly complete skull, Several vertebrae from the atlas to the end of the sacrum, and both ilia	A titanosaur	
Overosaurus	O. paradasorum		Upper	A fully articulated vertebral series consists of rib bones, dorsals, and ilium	A titanosaur	
Rinconsaurus	R. caudamirus	Rincón de los Sauces	Lower	The fossil remains included vertebrae, limb bones, scapula, hip bones (pubis, ilium, and ischium) and several ribs.	A titanosaur	
Traukutitan	T. eocaudata	Sitio Trauku	Lower	A partial semi-articulated skeleton including both thigh bones and thirteen vertebrae from the anterior and middle tail	A titanosaur	
Yeneen	Y. houssayi	La Invernada	Lower	A disarticulated skeleton including vertebrae from all major regions, the ilia, and ribs, in addition to an isolated ilium of a second individual and a third undescribed specimen	A titanosaur	

==== Theropods ====
Theropods reported from the Bajo de la Carpa Formation
Genus	Species	Location	Stratigraphic position	Material	Notes	Images
Achillesaurus	A. manazzonei	Paso Córdova	Upper	A partial skeleton consists of a sacral vertebra, four tail vertebrae, part of the left thighbone, shin, and foot, and the left ilium.	An alvarezsaurid	Alvarezsaurus Diuqin Patagopteryx Tratayenia Rinconraptor Velocisaurus Viavenator
Alvarezsaurus	A. calvoi	Boca del Sapo,	Upper	A set of postcrania	An alvarezsaurid	Alvarezsaurus Diuqin Patagopteryx Tratayenia Rinconraptor Velocisaurus Viavenator
Diuqin	D. lechiguanae	"the isthmus between the southeast coast of Lago Barreales and the northwest coast of Lago Mari Menuco"	Upper	A fragmentary but associated partial skeleton	An unenlagiine	Alvarezsaurus Diuqin Patagopteryx Tratayenia Rinconraptor Velocisaurus Viavenator
Llukalkan	L. aliocranianus	La Invernada site.	Upper	A partial skull.	An abelisaurid	Alvarezsaurus Diuqin Patagopteryx Tratayenia Rinconraptor Velocisaurus Viavenator
Neuquenornis	N. volans	Boca del Sapo	Upper	A skull and a partial postcranial remains.	An enantiornithean	Alvarezsaurus Diuqin Patagopteryx Tratayenia Rinconraptor Velocisaurus Viavenator
Patagopteryx	P. deferrariisi	Boca del Sapo	Upper	A partial, incomplete skeleton consisting of 18 vertebrae, synsacrum, and much of the pectoral and pelvic girdles, wings, and hindlimbs.	A flightless euornithean	Alvarezsaurus Diuqin Patagopteryx Tratayenia Rinconraptor Velocisaurus Viavenator
Rinconraptor	R. pipoae	Cerro Overo	Upper	A fragmentary partial skeleton	A megaraptoran	Alvarezsaurus Diuqin Patagopteryx Tratayenia Rinconraptor Velocisaurus Viavenator
Tratayenia	T. rosalesi	Traytenia locality	Upper	A well-preserved partial skeleton	A megaraptoran	Alvarezsaurus Diuqin Patagopteryx Tratayenia Rinconraptor Velocisaurus Viavenator
Velocisaurus	V. unicus	Universidad Nacional del Comahue	Upper	A set of limb elements.	A noasaurid	Alvarezsaurus Diuqin Patagopteryx Tratayenia Rinconraptor Velocisaurus Viavenator
Viavenator	V. exxoni	La Invernada	Upper	A partial skeleton	An abelisaurid	Alvarezsaurus Diuqin Patagopteryx Tratayenia Rinconraptor Velocisaurus Viavenator

==== Other reptiles ====
Other reptiles reported from the Bajo de la Carpa Formation
Genus	Species	Location	Stratigraphic position	Material	Notes	Images
Lomalatachelys	L. neuquina				A chelid turtle	
Dinilysia	D. patagonica				A snake	
Paleochelco	P. occultato				A lizard	
Podocnemidoidea	Indeterminate					

== See also ==
- List of fossil sites
- List of dinosaur bearing rock formations
- Mata Amarilla Formation, contemporaneous formation of the Austral Basin
