= A. giganteus =

A. giganteus may refer to:

- Amphicyon giganteus, an extinct large carnivorous bone crushing mammal species from the middle Oligocene and early Miocene
- Antarctosaurus giganteus, an extinct titanosaurian sauropod dinosaur species from the Late Cretaceous Period of what is now South America
