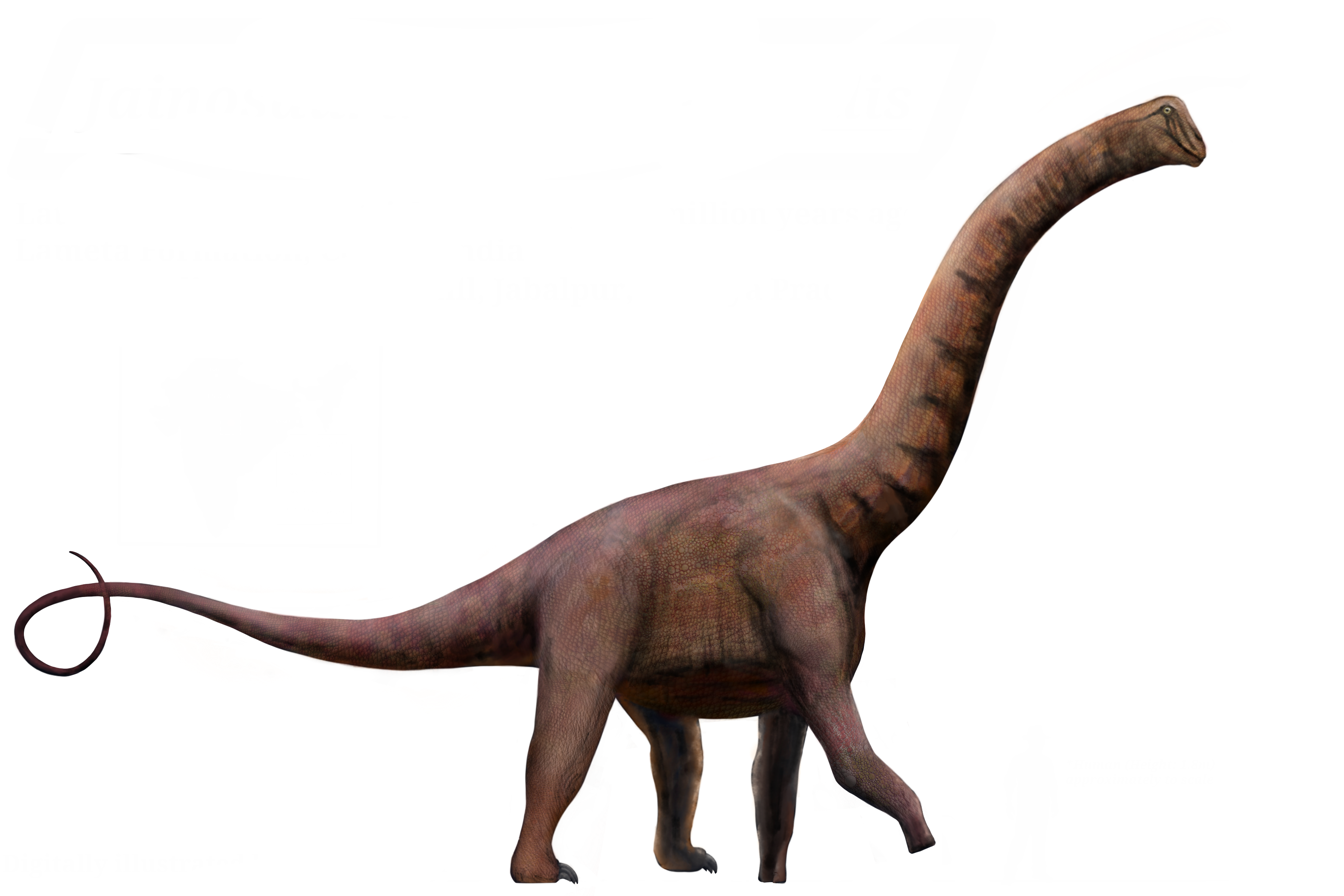
- Life restoration of Jainosaurus septentrionalis

Scientific classification
- Kingdom: Animalia
- Phylum: Chordata
- Class: Reptilia
- Clade: Dinosauria
- Clade: Saurischia
- Clade: †Sauropodomorpha
- Clade: †Sauropoda
- Clade: †Eusauropoda
- Clade: †Macronaria
- Clade: †Titanosauria
- Clade: †Colossosauria
- Genus: †Jainosaurus; Hunt et al., 1995

Type species
- †Jainosaurus septentrionalis (Huene & Matley, 1933)

Synonyms
- Antarctosaurus septentrionalis Huene & Matley, 1933

= Jainosaurus =

Jainosaurus Temporal range: Late Cretaceous, 68 Ma

Extinct genus of dinosaurs

Jainosaurus is a genus of titanosaurian sauropod dinosaur that lived in India during the Maastrichtian age (approximately 68 million years ago). It is thought to have been about the same size as its contemporary relative Isisaurus, measuring 18 metres (59 ft) long and weighing 15 metric tons (17 short tons). The humerus of the type specimen is 134 centimetres long.

== History ==
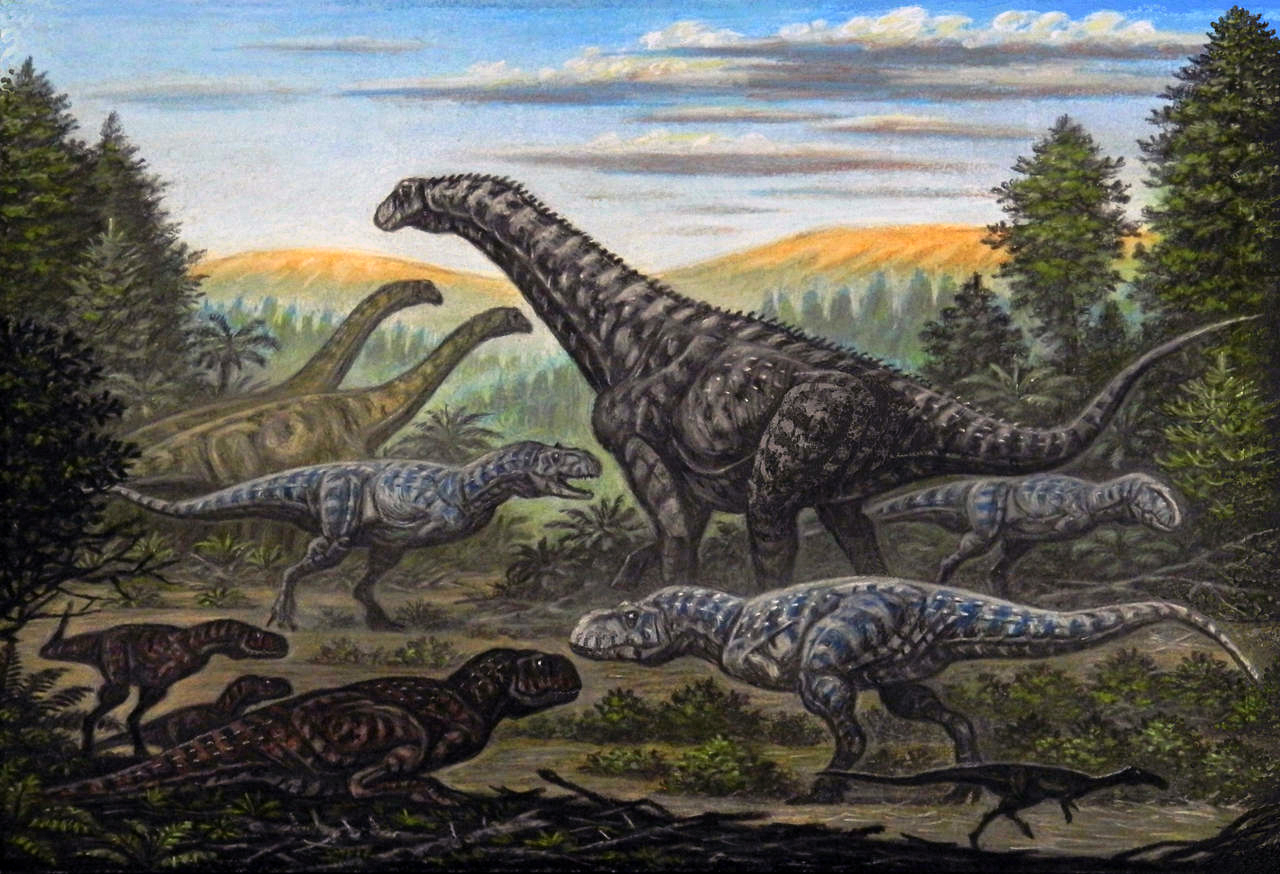
Life restoration of Jainosaurus (left background) with contemporary dinosaurs

The type species of Jainosaurus, J. septentrionalis has a long and complex taxonomic history closely connected to the history of the problematic genera Titanosaurus and Antarctosaurus. The first known remains attributable to Jainosaurus, the humerus GSI K22/754, was discovered in 1871 or 1872 by Henry Benedict Medlicott, and the holotype remains were found by Charles Alfred Matley between 1917 and 1920 near Jabalpur in the Lameta Formation. These were named Antarctosaurus septentrionalis by Friedrich von Huene and Matley in 1933.

Jainosaurus type locality in Carnosaur beds, Bara Simla, Jabalpur, Madhya Pradesh, India

The specific name of J. septentrionalis means "northern" in Latin, a reference to the fact that the species was discovered on the Northern Hemisphere whereas Antarctosaurus means "saurian from the Southern Hemisphere" because its type species Antarctosaurus wichmannianus was found in Argentina. The generic name honours the Indian paleontologist Sohan Lal Jain, who worked on the cranial nerve impressions in the skull; and in 1982 published a study about the results. Ironically, Jain himself considered the remains synonymous with Titanosaurus in the 1997 description of Isisaurus. However, Wilson and Upchurch (2003) rejected the synonymy of Jainosaurus and Titanosaurus due to the dubious status of the latter.

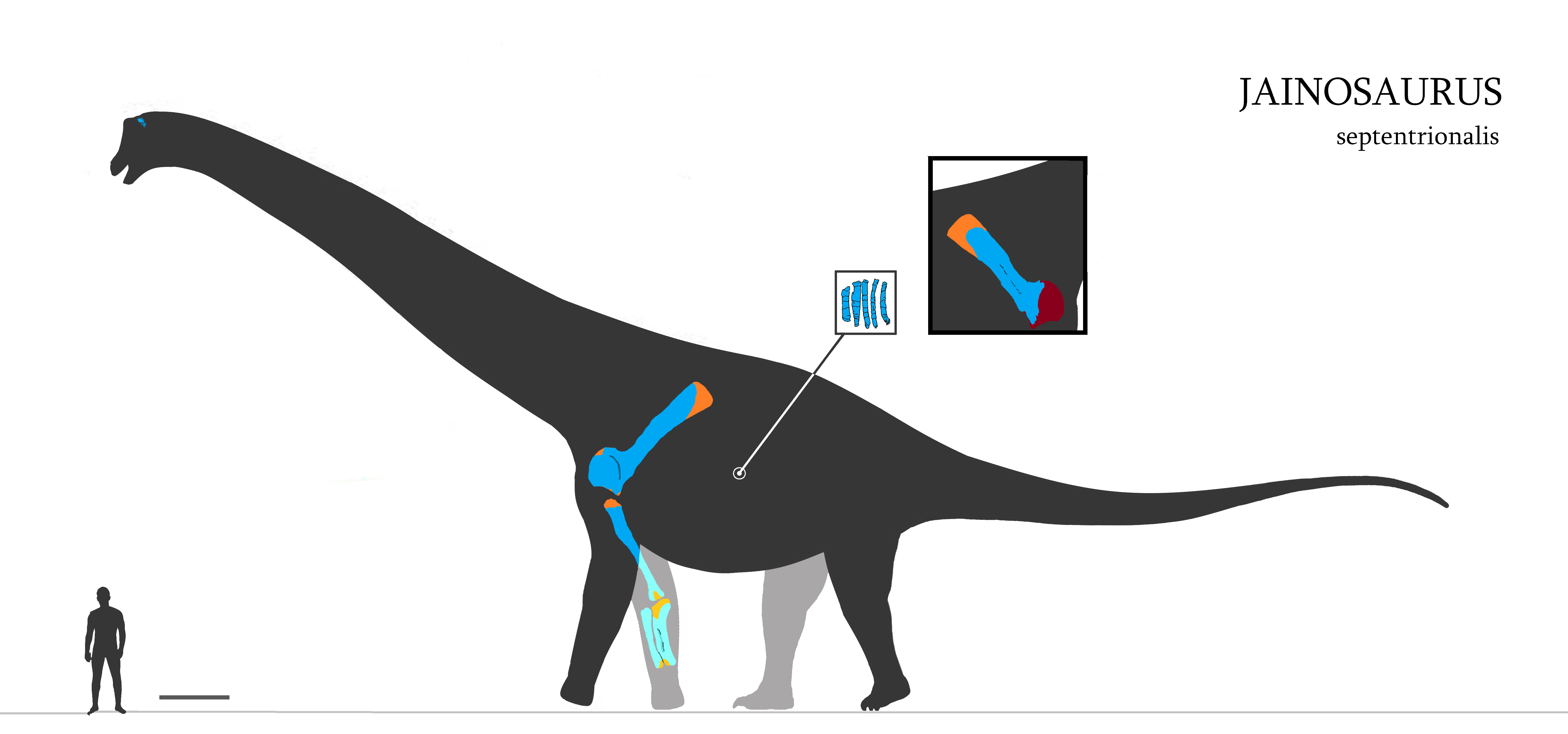
Skeletal consisting of all the material referred to it by Wilson et al., 2009. Blue is preserved, orange is extrapolated and red is material broken after excavation.

In 1995 Hunt et al., believing Antarctosaurus to belong to Dicraeosauridae, made the clearly titanosaurian Antarctosaurus septentrionalis the type species of a new genus, Jainosaurus, and determined that the braincase, GSI IM K27/497, should be the lectotype. Jainosaurus was further distinguished from Antarctosaurus by details of the braincase.

In 2009, Jeffrey Wilson and others made a detailed reassessment of Jainosaurus septentrionalis and confirmed its validity. The postcrania, which had been assumed lost, were shown to be largely present in the collection of the Geological Survey of India at Calcutta. They include: dorsal rib fragments (GSI K20/326, K27/425); a caudal vertebra (GSI K20/317), four chevrons (GSI K27/492–494, 496), the left and right scapula (only a cast still extant); a sternal plate (GSI K20/647); a humerus (lacking an inventory number), a radius (GSI K27/490) and an ulna (GSI K27/491). In 1996 Sankar Chatterjee referred a second braincase to the species: ISI R162. Some material from Pakistan also possibly belongs to Jainosaurus. Some material collected from Chota Simla region that are housed in Natural History Museum might also belong to this taxon, however the specimen is smaller than the holotype.

Wilson e.a. concluded that Jainosaurus is a valid taxon, clearly distinguishable from Isisaurus. It would have been a fairly derived member of the Titanosauria, more closely related to South American forms like Pitekunsaurus, Muyelensaurus and Antarctosaurus than to Isisaurus or Rapetosaurus.
