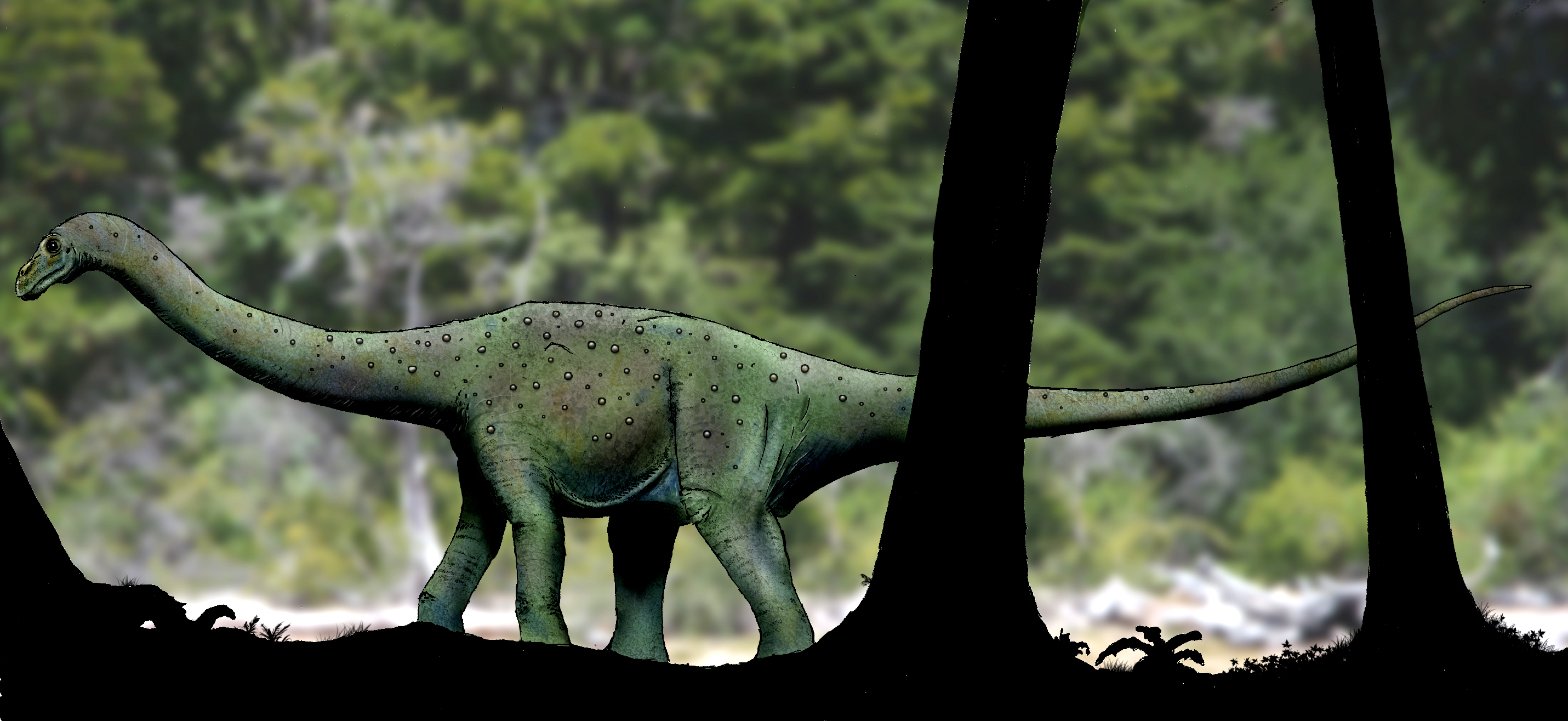
- Life reconstruction of Petrobrasaurus in its habitat

Scientific classification
- Kingdom: Animalia
- Phylum: Chordata
- Class: Reptilia
- Clade: Dinosauria
- Clade: Saurischia
- Clade: †Sauropodomorpha
- Clade: †Sauropoda
- Clade: †Macronaria
- Clade: †Titanosauria
- Genus: †Petrobrasaurus; Filippi et al., 2011

Type species
- †Petrobrasaurus puestohernandezi Filippi et al., 2011

= Petrobrasaurus =

Petrobrasaurus Temporal range: Late Cretaceous, 88–83 Ma

Extinct genus of dinosaurs

Size comparison

Petrobrasaurus is a genus of herbivorous sauropod dinosaur. It is a titanosaur which lived during the upper Cretaceous period (Coniacian-Santonian age) in what is now Rincón de los Sauces, Patagonia, Argentina. It is known from the holotype MAU-Pv-PH-449 — a partial disarticulated skeleton recovered from the Plottier Formation (Neuquén Basin), Argentina. This genus was named by Leonardo S. Filippi, José Ignacio Canudo, Leonardo J. Salgado, Alberto C. Garrido, Rodolfo A. Garcia, Ignacio A. Cerda and Alejandro Otero in 2011, and the type species is Petrobrasaurus puestohernandezi. The generic name is derived from "Petrobras" (oil company) and saurus, "lizard". The specific name refers to the Puesto Hernández oil field, where the fossil remains were found.
