= Ilyocyprididae =

Scientific classification
- Domain: Eukaryota
- Kingdom: Animalia
- Phylum: Arthropoda
- Class: Ostracoda
- Order: Podocopida
- Family: Ilyocyprididae

Family of crustaceans

Ilyocyprididae is a family of ostracods belonging to the order Podocopida.

Genera:

- Ilyocyprella
- Jeiocypris
- Jliocypris
- Juxilyocypris Kempf, 2011
- Neuquenocypris Musacchio, 1973
- Renicypris Ye, 2002
