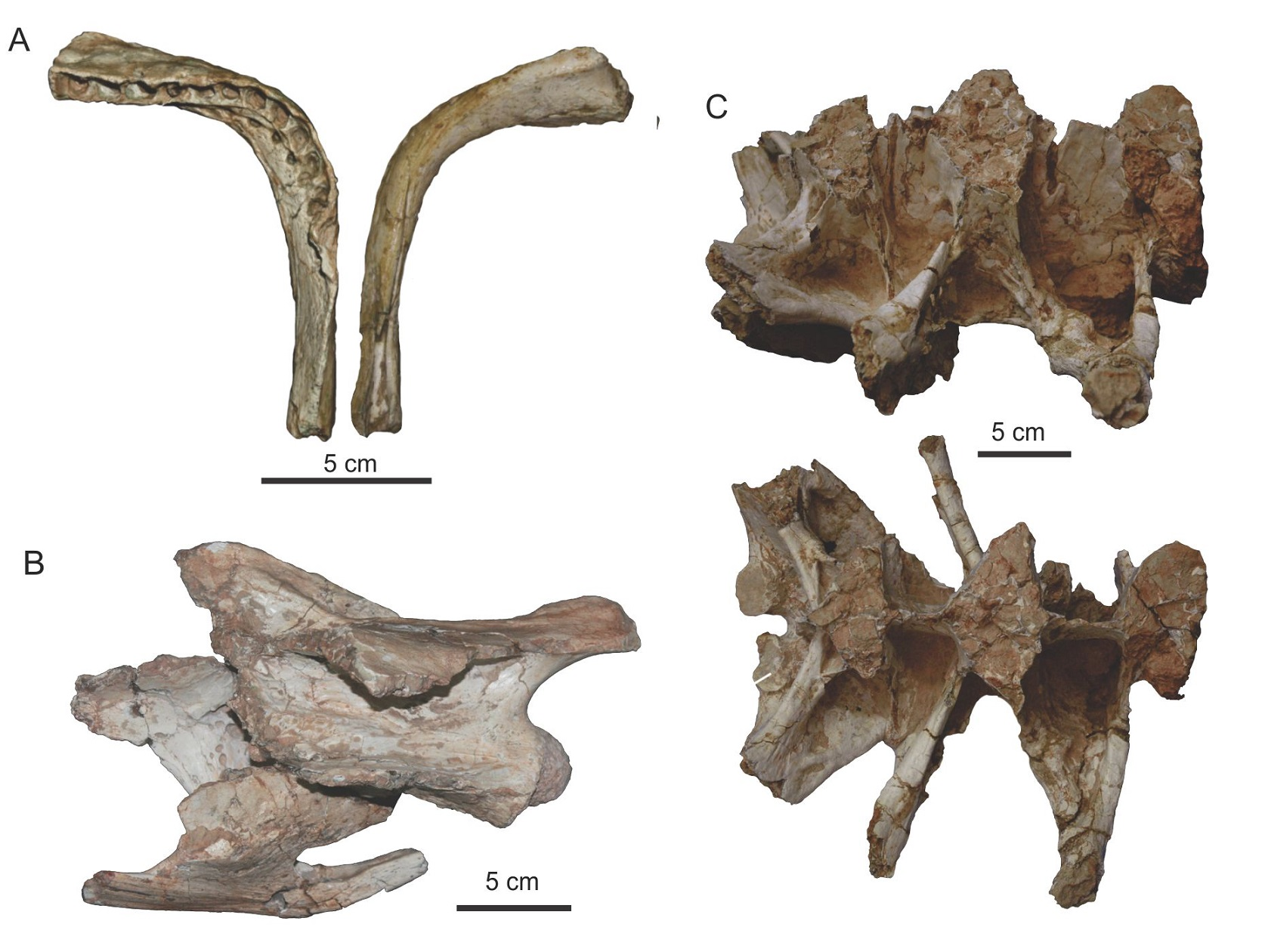
- Select elements of the Brasilotitan holotype

Scientific classification
- Kingdom: Animalia
- Phylum: Chordata
- Class: Reptilia
- Clade: Dinosauria
- Clade: Saurischia
- Clade: †Sauropodomorpha
- Clade: †Sauropoda
- Clade: †Macronaria
- Clade: †Titanosauria
- Clade: †Lithostrotia
- Genus: †Brasilotitan; Machado et al., 2013
- Species: †B. nemophagus

Binomial name
- †Brasilotitan nemophagus Machado et al., 2013

= Brasilotitan =

Brasilotitan Temporal range: Late Cretaceous, 72–70 Ma

Extinct genus of dinosaurs

Brasilotitan (meaning "Brazil giant") is a genus of titanosaurian sauropod dinosaur from the Late Cretaceous (early Maastrichtian) Adamantina Formation of Brazil. The type species is Brasilotitan nemophagus. Brasilotitan was a small titanosaur with a squared-off snout, and may be closely related to another Brazilian titanosaur, Uberabatitan.

== Discovery and naming ==
In 2000, William R. Nava collected the partial skeleton of a sauropod along a road in São Paulo state near Presidente Prudente city. In 2013, a team of researchers, including Nava and led by Elaine B. Machado, described the remains as a new genus and species of sauropod, Brasilotitan nemophagus. The genus name refers to its discovery in Brazil and to the Titans of Greek mythology, and the species epithet combines the Greek words némos "pasture, wood" and phagos "to eat", in reference to its herbivorous diet.

=== Fossil record ===
Fossils of Brasilotitan nemophagus are known from the Adamantina Formation, although in 2017 Brusatte and colleagues suggested that some of the sauropod fossils reported from the Adamantina Formation may actually come from the Presidente Prudente Formation. The holotype specimen, MPM 125R, is a partial skeleton that consists of the right dentary, two partial cervical vertebrae, a partial sacrum, two fragments of the pelvis pertaining to the ilium and ischium, and an ungual phalanx. A tooth fragment that was found nearby, MPM 126R, may belong to the same skeleton. The holotype specimen was likely scavenged by theropods before being buried, as some of the bones show puncture marks and theropod teeth were found alongside the skeleton.

== Description ==
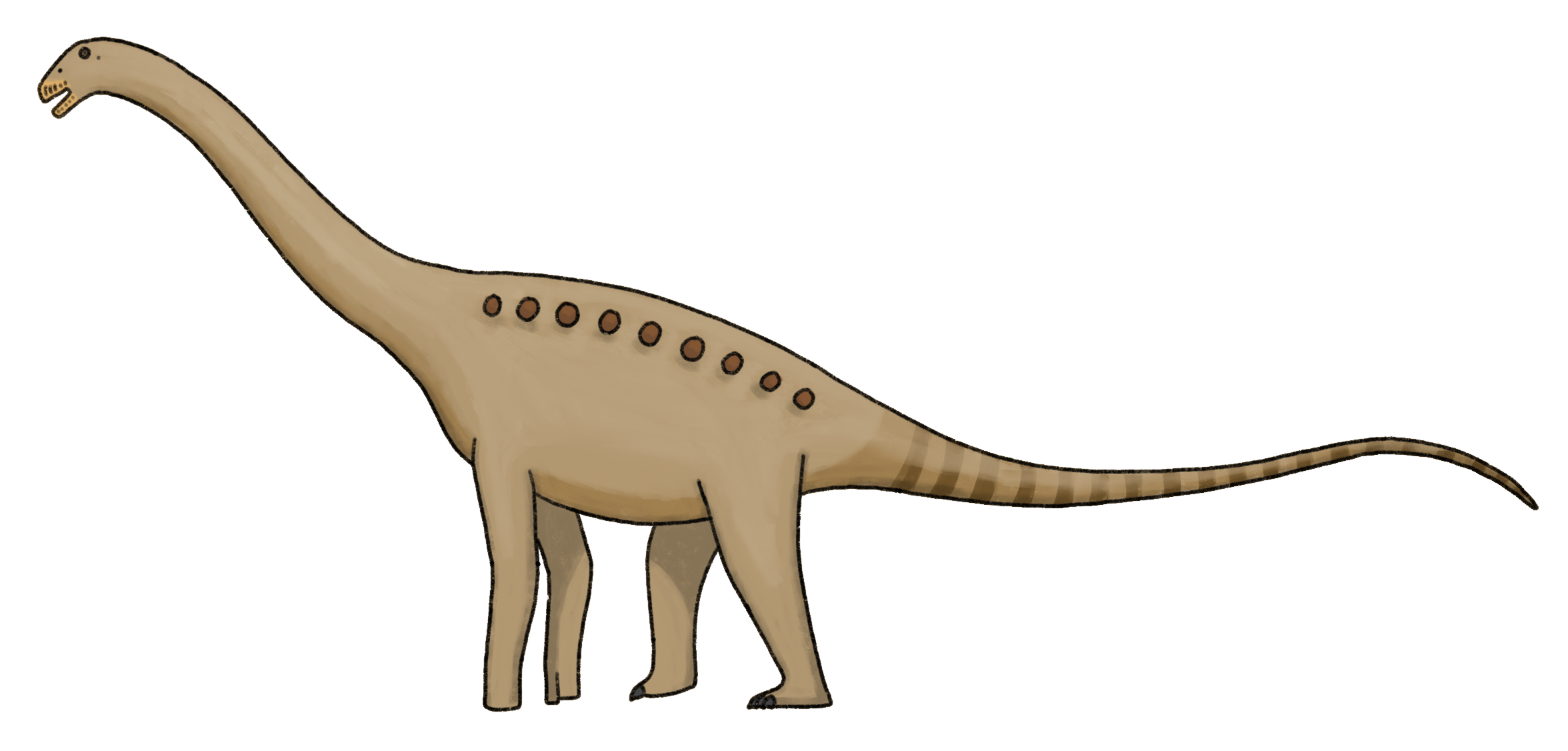
Speculative life restoration

Brasilotitan was small for a sauropod, probably less than 12 metres (39 ft) long. As in several other titanosaurs, the mandible is L-shaped, producting a squared-off snout. The symphyseal region of the dentary is slightly twisted medially, a feature never recorded before in any titanosaur. The neural spines of the cervical vertebrae are relatively low.

== Phylogeny ==
Although the phylogenetic position of Brasilotitan is difficult to establish, the species is neither basal nor a derived member of Titanosauria. Based on lower jaw morphology, it appears to be closely related to Antarctosaurus and Bonitasaura. Its discovery enriched the titanosaur diversity of Brazil and provided further new anatomical information on the lower jaws of those herbivorous dinosaurs.

Phylogenetic analyses have found Brasilotitan to be the sister taxon of another Brazilian titanosaur, Uberabatitan. Filippi et al. included Brasilotitan in what they called "Clade A", a grouping of titanosaurs with square jaws.
