= Narambuenatitan =

Narambuenatitan Temporal range: Late Cretaceous, Campanian

Scientific classification
- Kingdom: Animalia
- Phylum: Chordata
- Clade: Dinosauria
- Clade: Saurischia
- Clade: †Sauropodomorpha
- Clade: †Sauropoda
- Clade: †Macronaria
- Clade: †Titanosauria
- Clade: †Lithostrotia
- Genus: †Narambuenatitan; Filippi, García & Garrido, 2011
- Species: †N. palomoi

Binomial name
- †Narambuenatitan palomoi Filippi, García & Garrido, 2011

Extinct genus of reptiles

Narambuenatitan is a genus of lithostrotian titanosaur sauropod from late Cretaceous (lower-middle Campanian stage) deposits of northern Patagonia of Argentina. Narambuenatitan is known from the holotype MAU-Pv-N-425, an incomplete skeleton. It was collected in 2005 and 2006 from the Anacleto Formation (Neuquén Group) in northern Patagonia. It was first named by Leonardo S. Filippi, Rodolfo A. García and Alberto C. Garrido in 2011 and the type species Narambuenatitan palomoi. The generic name refers to Puesto Narambuena. The specific name honours the discoverer, Salvador Palomo.

Narmabuenatitan was assigned to the clade Lithostrotia in a trichotomy with Epachthosaurus and the more derived clade Eutitanosauria.
