= Paleochelco =

Paleochelco Temporal range: Late Cretaceous

Scientific classification
- Domain: Eukaryota
- Kingdom: Animalia
- Phylum: Chordata
- Class: Reptilia
- Order: Squamata
- Genus: †Paleochelco; Martinelli, Agnolín & Ezcurra, 2021
- Species: †P. occultato

Binomial name
- †Paleochelco occultato Martinelli, Agnolín & Ezcurra, 2021

Extinct genus of lizards

Paleochelco is an extinct genus of lizard, possibly a polyglyphanodontian, found in the Late Cretaceous Bajo de la Carpa Formation in Argentina. It contains a single species, P. occultato.
