= Traukutitan =

Traukutitan Temporal range: Santonian ~85 Ma

Scientific classification
- Kingdom: Animalia
- Phylum: Chordata
- Class: Reptilia
- Clade: Dinosauria
- Clade: Saurischia
- Clade: †Sauropodomorpha
- Clade: †Sauropoda
- Clade: †Macronaria
- Clade: †Titanosauria
- Clade: †Lognkosauria
- Genus: †Traukutitan; Juárez Valieri & Calvo, 2011

Type species
- †Traukutitan eocaudata Juárez Valieri & Calvo, 2011

Extinct genus of dinosaurs

Traukutitan is a genus of titanosaur sauropod dinosaur which lived during the late Cretaceous (Santonian age).

== Discovery ==
Fossils of Traukutitan were recovered from the lowermost section of the Bajo de la Carpa Formation (Neuquén Group) in North Patagonia of Argentina and described but not named in 1993 by Leonardo Salgado and Jorge Orlando Calvo. Traukutitan was named by Rubén Darío Juárez Valieri and Calvo in 2011 on the basis of holotype MUCPv 204, a partial semi-articulated skeleton including both thigh bones and thirteen vertebrae from the anterior and middle tail. The type species is Traukutitan eocaudata. The generic name refers to Trauku, the Araucanian mountain spirit, usually represented like a giant, and titan, the name of the Greek mythological giants. The specific name is derived from Greek eos, "dawn", and Latin cauda, "tail", a reference to the basal morphology of the middle caudal vertebrae.

== Description ==
Traukutitan has been described as a "large titanosaurid". The articular morphology of the middle tail vertebrae is a flat instead of a convex face on the posterior surface of their centra.

The authors assigned Traukutitan to the Titanosauridae; it is a possible member of the Lognkosauria.
