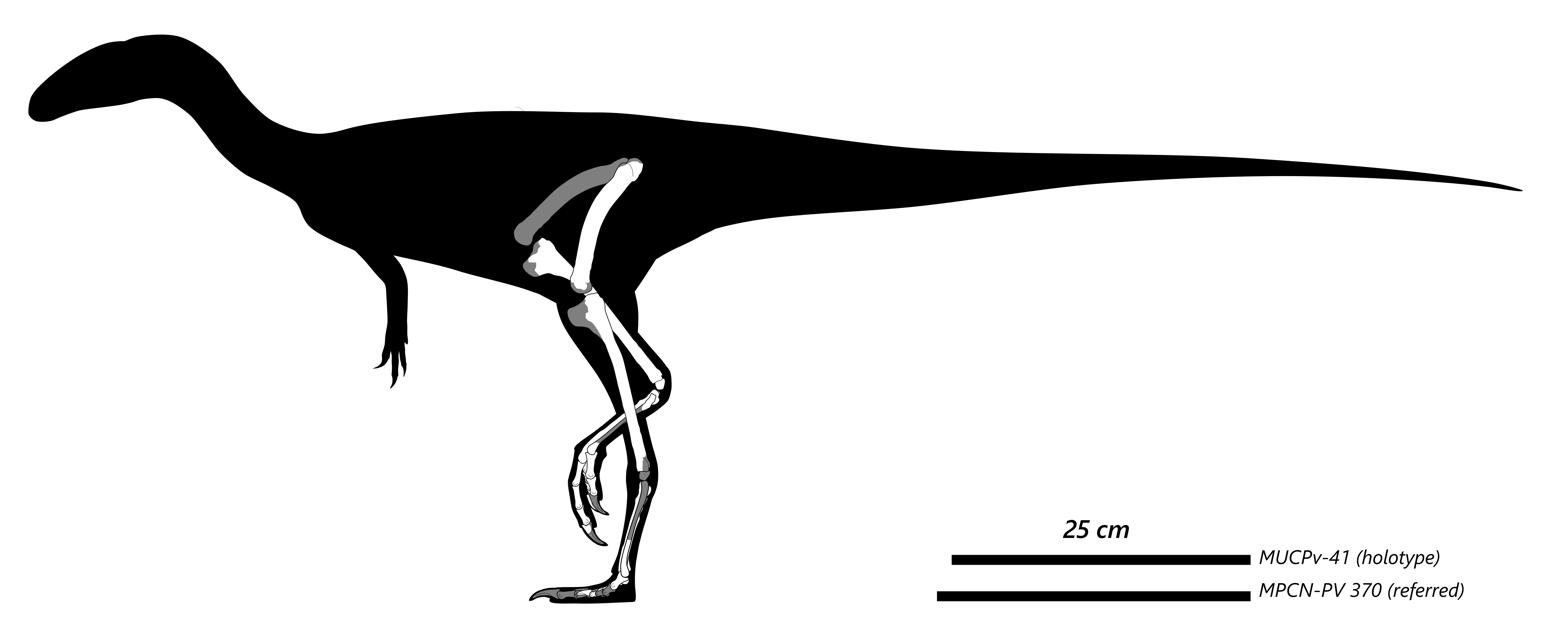
- Skeletal diagram of Velocisaurus unicus

Scientific classification
- Kingdom: Animalia
- Phylum: Chordata
- Class: Reptilia
- Clade: Dinosauria
- Clade: Saurischia
- Clade: Theropoda
- Family: †Noasauridae
- Genus: †Velocisaurus; Bonaparte, 1991
- Species: †V. unicus

Binomial name
- †Velocisaurus unicus Bonaparte, 1991

= Velocisaurus =

Velocisaurus Temporal range: Santonian ~85 Ma

Extinct genus of dinosaurs

Velocisaurus ("swift lizard") is a genus of noasaurid theropod dinosaur from the Late Cretaceous period of Argentina.

== Description ==
Size of Velocisaurus compared to a human

Velocisaurus was probably around 1.5 meters (4.9 feet) long, based on a tibia length of 14 centimetres (5.5 in). This makes it the smallest noasaurid, after Berthasaura. The foot is unique in that the middle (third) metatarsal has become the main weight-bearing element. Its upper end has thickened whereas the shafts of the adjoining second and fourth metatarsals have thinned considerably. Such a configuration is unknown for other theropods, including birds. Bonaparte explained it as an adaptation for a cursorial (running) lifestyle. The high speed would have been necessary to escape larger theropods; Bonaparte suggested that Velocisaurus was itself an omnivore, as indicated by the fact that the sole claw found, of the fourth toe, was not trenchant but relatively straight.

Velocisaurus can be characterized by several traits unknown in other Abelisauroids. These include:

- A subtriangular cross section of the femur, with the medial and lateral sides converging to form a thick crest pointing anteriorly (a subtriangular cross section of the femur is also known in Masiakasaurus).
- A long and slender tibia with a large anteriorly flat distal end to accommodate a large ascending process of the astragalus (reminiscent of derived coelurosaurs and ornithomimids).
- Very thin and rod-like metatarsals II and IV (metatarsal II is reduced to a lesser extent in other noasaurids and some abelisaurids as well).
- An anteroposteriorly short and dorsoventrally tall subtriangular pedal phalanx IV-1, with a narrow dorsal surface. Velocisaurus Is Actually Similar To Velociraptor.

== History of discovery ==
In 1985 Oscar de Ferrariis and Zulma Brandoni de Gasparini uncovered fossils at Boca del Sapo in Neuquén province of Patagonia from layers of the Bajo de la Carpa Formation, dating from the Santonian. Among them was the right lower hind limb of a small theropod. In 1991 this dinosaur was described and named by José Bonaparte as Velocisaurus unicus. The generic name is derived from Latin velox, "swift", a reference to the fact that the hind leg and foot show adaptations for running. The specific name means "unique" in Latin, referring to the exceptional build of the foot. The genus and species are based on the holotype MUCPv 41, a nearly complete right leg which is part of the collection of the Museo de la Universidad Nacional del Comahue. A somewhat complete left leg, specimen MPCN-PV-370, was described in 2016.

== Classification ==
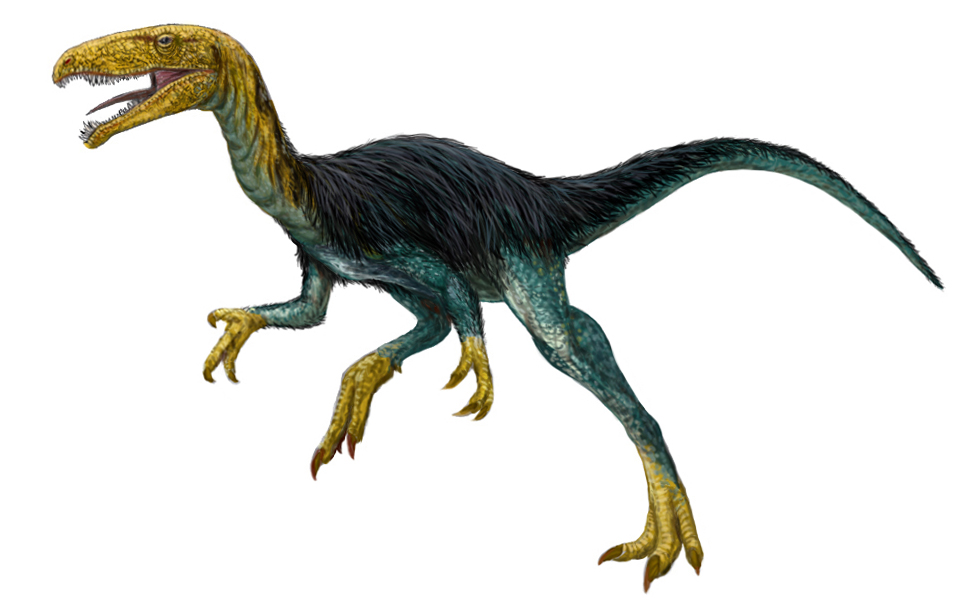
Speculative life restoration of Velocisaurus, with head based on that of Masiakasaurus

Bonaparte originally assigned Velocisaurus to a family of its own, the Velocisauridae. A study of theropod relationships by Fernando Novas and Sebastian Apesteguia in 2003 showed that Velocisaurus was a close relative of the strange ceratosaur Masiakasaurus. These two may form a subfamily, the Velocisaurinae. In 2004 this subfamily was assigned to the Noasauridae within the more inclusive Abelisauroidea.

== Palaeobiology ==
In a 2001 study conducted by Bruce Rothschild and other paleontologists, 12 foot bones referred to Velocisaurus were examined for signs of stress fracture, but none were found.

== See also ==
- Timeline of ceratosaur research
