= Antarctosaurus =

Antarctosaurus Temporal range: Late Cretaceous, 83 Ma
- Hypothetical Antarctosaurus wichmannianus skull diagram showing the bones illustrated by von Huene in 1929. It's not certain that the mandible and braincase belong to the same individual or even same genus.

Scientific classification
- Kingdom: Animalia
- Phylum: Chordata
- Clade: Dinosauria
- Clade: Saurischia
- Clade: †Sauropodomorpha
- Clade: †Sauropoda
- Clade: †Macronaria
- Clade: †Titanosauria
- Clade: †Colossosauria
- Genus: †Antarctosaurus von Huene, 1929

Species
- †A. wichmannianus von Huene, 1929 (type); †"A." giganteus von Huene, 1929; †"A." jaxarticus Riabinin, 1938; †"A." brasiliensis Arid & Vizotto, 1971

Synonyms
- Laplatasaurus wichmannianus von Huene, 1929

Sauropod dinosaur genus from Late Cretaceous

Antarctosaurus (/ænˌtɑːrktoʊˈsɔːrəs/; meaning "southern lizard") is a genus of titanosaurian sauropod dinosaur from the Late Cretaceous Period of what is now South America. The type species, Antarctosaurus wichmannianus, and a second species, Antarctosaurus giganteus, were described by prolific German paleontologist Friedrich von Huene in 1929. Three additional species of Antarctosaurus have been named since then but later studies have considered them dubious or unlikely to pertain to the genus.

The type species, A. wichmannianus, is controversial because there is uncertainty as to whether all the described remains belong to the same individual or even genus. The second species, A. giganteus, is considered dubious, but the fragmentary remains represent one of the largest dinosaurs known.

== Discovery and species ==
The size of three femora referred to Antarctosaurus by von Huene in 1929.

Remains of this dinosaur were first mentioned in print in 1916, although they were not fully described and named until a 1929 monograph written by paleontologist Friedrich von Huene. Antarctosaurus does not refer to the continent of Antarctica since it was first found in Argentina, although it does have the same derivation, from the Greek words αντι-, anti- meaning 'opposite of', αρκτός, arktos meaning 'north' and σαυρος, sauros meaning 'lizard'. The generic name refers to the animal's reptilian nature and its geographical location on a southern continent.

Antarctosaurus wichmannianus is the type species of the genus, named in 1929 after the discoverer of its remains in 1912, geologist Ricardo Wichmann. Von Huene used the name A. wichmannianus to describe a large assemblage of bones, which are considered to come from the Anacleto Formation in Río Negro Province of Argentina, which is probably early Campanian in age. Two additional limb bones, found in the Chubut Province in 1924, were also referred to A. wichmannianus by von Huene in 1929. Later studies, however, have doubted their referral to the species.

Von Huene also named a fragmentary second species of Antarctosaurus in the same 1929 monograph, which he tentatively called cf. Antarctosaurus giganteus because of its enormous size. These fossils were recovered in Neuquén Province of Argentina, from the Plottier Formation, which dates to the Coniacian-Santonian stages of the Late Cretaceous Period. The Plottier, like the younger Anacleto, is a member of the Neuquén Group.

Very few remains are known of this species and it is regarded as a nomen dubium by some. Other researchers regard A. giganteus as a likely valid species but probably belonging to a new genus. In 1969, Leigh Van Valen considered A. wichmannianus and A. giganteus to be growth stages of the same species and favored the name A. giganteus. This idea is problematic because A. wichmannianus was named earlier in the same paper and it is known from more material, it should, therefore, get priority over A. giganteus. The two species are also not from the same geological formation which suggests they did not belong to the same time period.

In 1933, Von Huene and Charles Matley described another species, Antarctosaurus septentrionalis, meaning "northern". The remains were found in the Lameta Formation of Madhya Pradesh State in India. This species does preserve important anatomical information but has since been assigned to its own genus in 1994; Jainosaurus.

Antarctosaurus jaxarticus from Kazakhstan is known from a single femur. It was named by Soviet paleontologist Anatoly Riabinin in 1938, and was the first sauropod species from Kazakhstan. It was reported from a certain locality in the Kyzylkum Desert, but the exact location is unknown. It may have come from the Syuksyuk Formation (originally described as Dabrazinskaya Svita) which dates to the Santonian stage of the Late Cretaceous. Other researchers have considered it as either, Titanosauridae incertae sedis, as a nomen dubium, or as a nomen nudum.

In 1970, two fragmentary limb bones and a partial vertebra were found in the Adamantina Formation (originally described as Bauru Formation; has also been reported as the São José do Rio Preto Formation) of the northern Paraná Basin in Brazil. The remains were described by their discoverers Fahad Moysés Arid and Luiz Dino Vizotto in 1971 as A. brasiliensis. Other researchers have considered this species as either, a nomen dubium, or an indeterminate titanosaur.

== Description ==
Describing Antarctosaurus is problematic because the type species consists of elements that are of questionable association and none of the species described are known from complete remains, which has caused a confused taxonomy of the genus. Of the four additional species that have been assigned to Antarctosaurus over the years, three have been considered dubious and "Antarctosaurus" septentrionalis, was given its own genus, Jainosaurus.

The remains that have been described belong to sauropods, most probably titanosaurs, a group of large-bodied, quadrupedal herbivores, usually possessing a long neck and tail, with a small head.

=== Antarctosaurus wichmannianus ===
The assemblage of fossil remains that became known as A. wichmannianus were given the specimen number MACN 6904. The known material includes several skull fragments, including a braincase and an incomplete mandible (lower jaw), a cervical (neck) vertebra, a caudal (tail) vertebra, rib fragments, and numerous limb bones including a femur which measures 1.39 meters (4.6 ft) tall. None of the individual fossils were designated the holotype specimen so MACN 6904 is considered to be an assemblage of syntypes. The total length of A. wichmannianus has been estimated at around 17 meters (56 ft).

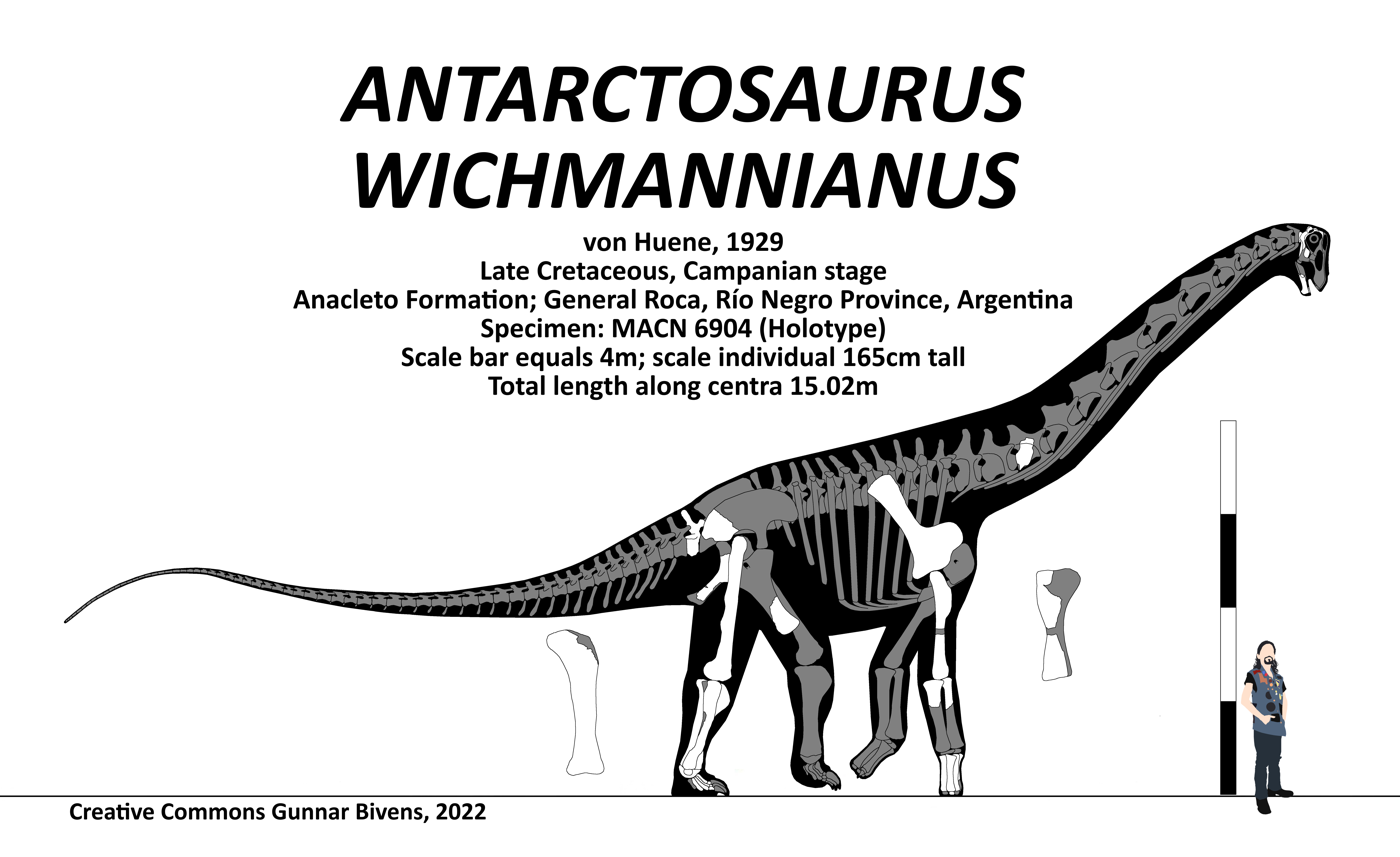
Skeletal reconstruction of A.wichmannianus. It's not certain that all the described remains are associated with one individual.

An additional femur and tibia were also referred by von Huene to A. wichmannianus; the femur, FMNH P13019, is over 1.85 meters (6.1 ft) tall. In one study the dimensions of this femur were used in a regression analysis to estimate the mass of A. wichmannianus at about 34 metric tons (37 short tons). The referral of the additional femur and tibia has been questioned by later researchers. In 2003 Jaime Eduardo Powell tentatively referred them to cf. Argyrosaurus and in 2012 Philip Mannion and Alejandro Otero considered it an indeterminate titanosaur.

The incomplete mandible attributed to A. wichmannianus is squared-off at the front with each dentary bone being ''L'' shaped. The teeth were restricted to the front of the lower jaw and were small and slender. The squared-off jaws suggest specialised feeding habits, such as feeding near a surface plane like low vegetation on the ground or floating plants in water.

The 'squared-off' or ''L'' shaped jaw bones of A.wichmannianus, shown in dorsal (top) view.

These bones were, for the most part, not associated with each other but scattered throughout the formation. Consequently, many scientists believe that they may not all belong to the same type of animal. In particular, the very square lower jaw has frequently been suggested to belong to a rebbachisaurid sauropod similar to Nigersaurus. However, the jaw of Bonitasaura, described in 2004, is similar in overall shape and is clearly associated with titanosaur skeletal remains, indicating that the lower jaw may belong to A. wichmannianus after all. In 2013 and 2018 respectively, Brasilotitan and Baalsaurus were described which also possessed squared-off jaws. It was noted that Brazilotitan, Bonitasaura, Antarctosaurus, and other titanosaurs show up three teeth per alveolus (tooth socket) whereas the rebbachisaurid Nigersaurus shows up to seven teeth. Brazilotitan and Baalsaurus were described as a titanosaurs, closely related to A. wichmannianus.

The back of the skull and the remainder of the skeleton are usually regarded as titanosaurian by researchers, although they do not necessarily belong to the same type of titanosaur. In 2005, Jeffrey Wilson considered the braincase as being referable to Nemegtosauridae but noted that other skull remains require further study. A study, published in 2012 by Ariana Paulina Carabajal, CT scanned the A. wichmannianus braincase which revealed the complete brain endocast and the inner ear structures. The brain endocast and inner ear share several features with other titanosaurids such as short olfactory tracts and olfactory bulbs that are horizontally projected.

Powell compared the width of the cranium to the length of the limb bones of both A. wichmannianus and Saltasaurus; this led him to conclude that the skull was proportionally small in A. wichmannianus, this might imply that the skull and limb elements could belong to different individuals or a different taxa. He noted, however, that the comparison was potentially misleading because the overall anatomy of Saltasaurus is shorter and stouter which might facilitate a bigger skull.

Von Huene assigned two tarsal (ankle) bones to A. wichmannianus, which he described as an astragalus and a calcanium. Powell suggested it's possible that the calcanium described by von Huene is actually the astragalus of a smaller individual. He also noted that the astragalus seems too small to belong to the same individual as the tibia, being only about half the width.

Von Huene described a caudal vertebra which was found close to the skull material. This vertebra was the first caudal, belonging to the base of the tail just after the sacrum (vertebrae attached to the hip). The vertebra features a biconvex centrum, a feature shared with other titanosaurs. Von Huene noted that the first caudal could possibly belong to Laplatasaurus.

With the exception of an incomplete cervical vertebra and the questionable first caudal, there are no vertebrae that link the skull to the limb material. There is a lack of field documentation to aid in the referral of all the material to one individual. Powell thought it was probable that von Huene correctly assigned the material to A. wichmannianus, arguing that von Huene would have been able to communicate with the discoverers and would have had access to photographs of the discovery site.

=== "Antarctosaurus" giganteus ===
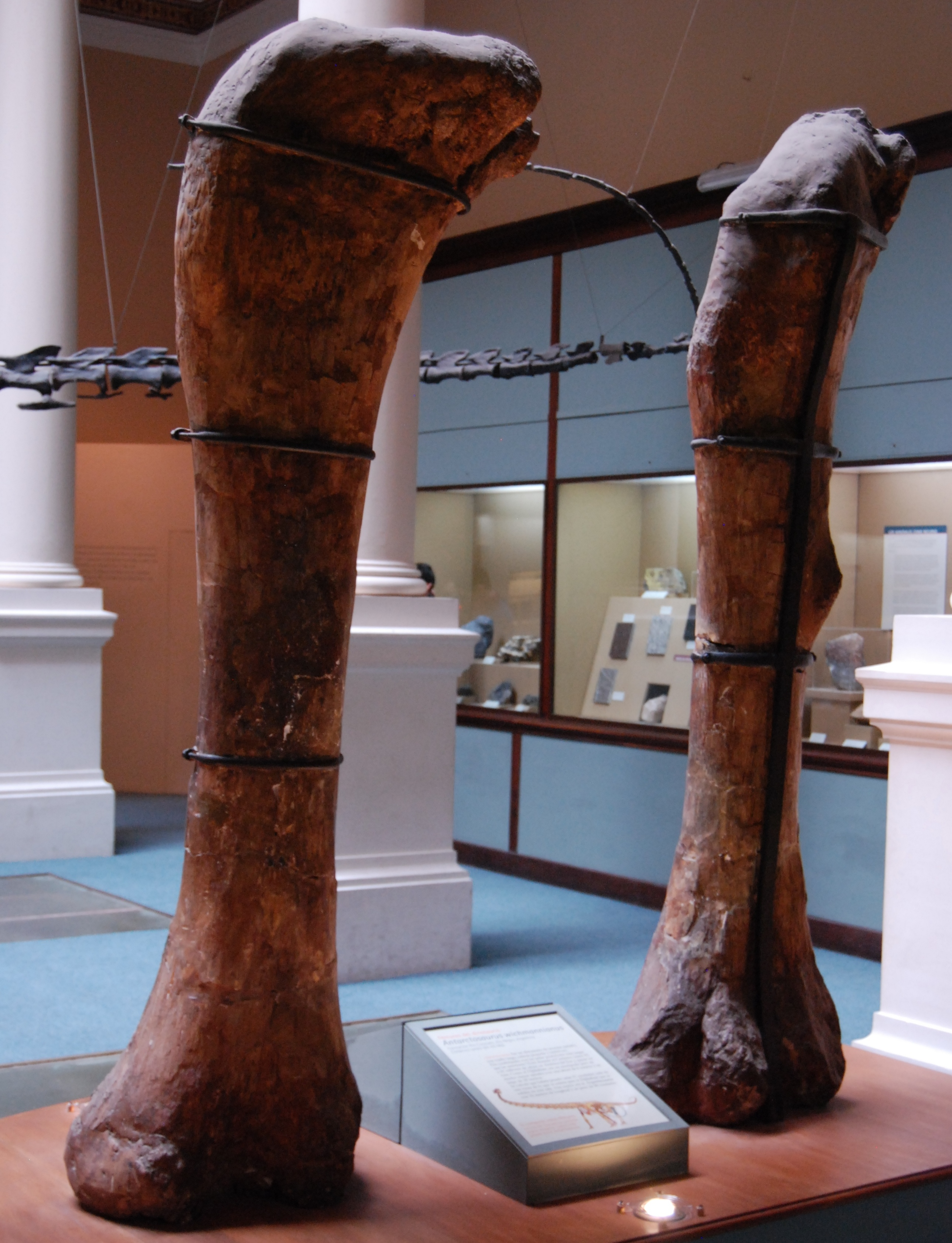
Antarctosaurus giganteus femora in La Plata Museum

The type specimen of A. giganteus, MLP 26-316, includes a left and right femur, a partial left and right pubis, the distal end of a damaged tibia, numerous rib and distal caudal vertebrae fragments, and six large and unidentifiable bones. The two gigantic femora measure 2.35 meters (7.7 ft) in length, which are among the largest of any known sauropod. Even though the femurs are large, they are also somewhat gracile in construction.

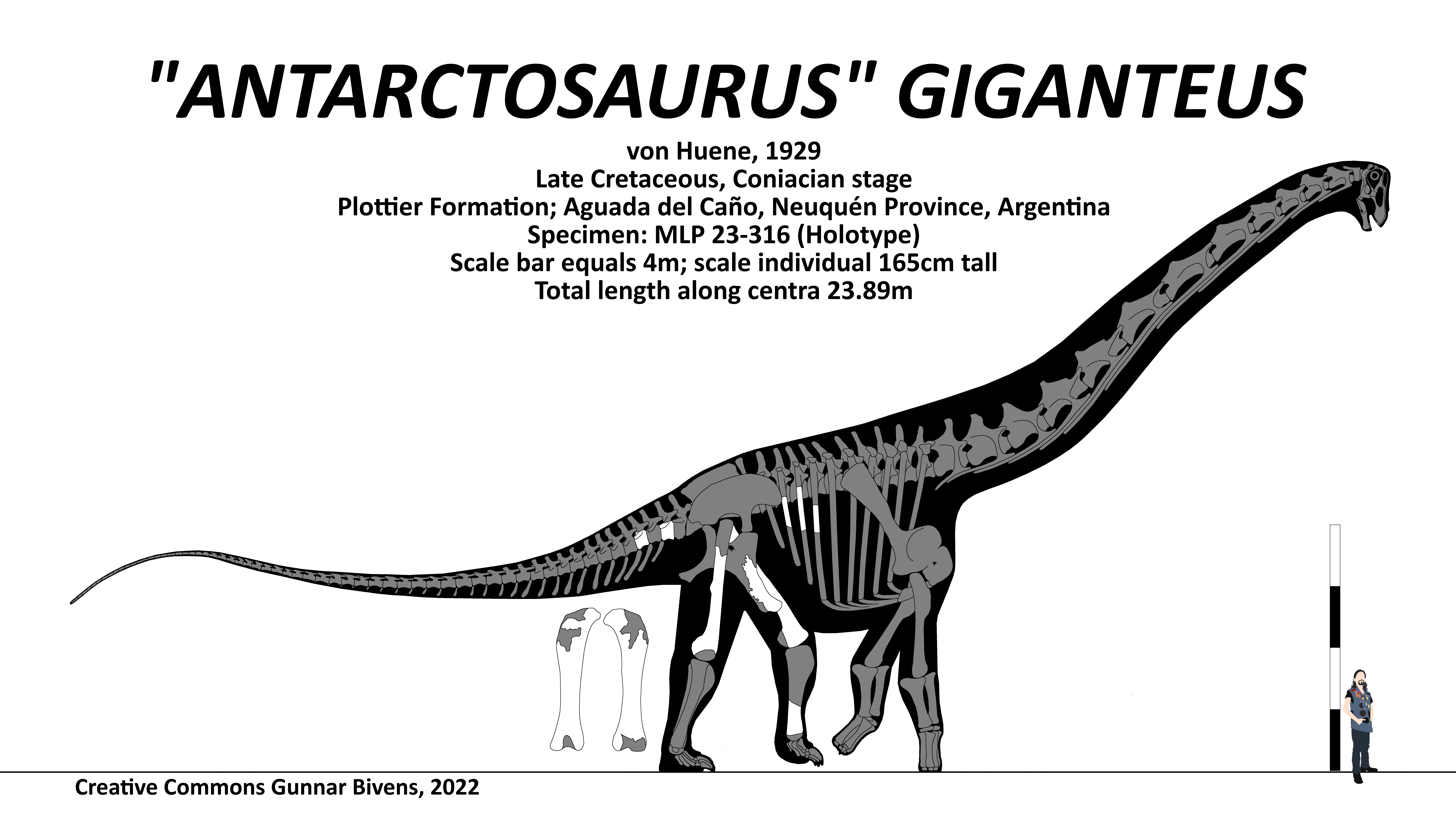
Skeletal reconstruction of A. giganteus. Due to limited remains the exact size is uncertain.

A reconstruction of A. giganteus, published in 1956 by Carlos Rusconi, was given a length around 30 meters (98 ft). In 1969, van Valen considered it as similar in size to Giraffatitan brancai (then called Brachiosaurus brancai). Based on an earlier mass estimate of G. brancai by Edwin Harris Colbert in 1962, van Valen gave A. giganteus an estimated mass of about 80 metric tons (88 short tons). In 1994, Gregory S. Paul estimated the weight of both A. giganteus and Argentinosaurus at between 80 and 100 metric tons (88 and 110 short tons) and lengths of 30 to 35 meters (98 to 115 ft) long. Extrapolating from the femur's parameters, a 2004 study by Gerardo Mazzetta and colleagues estimated the mass of A. giganteus at approximately 69 metric tons (76 short tons); slightly smaller than Argentinosaurus which in the same study was estimated at nearly 73 metric tons (80 short tons). This would make A. giganteus among the heaviest known land animals. In 2006, Kenneth Carpenter used the relatively short-necked Saltasaurus as a guide and estimated a length of 23 meters (75 ft) long. In an encyclopaedia supplementary, Thomas Holtz gave a length of 33 meters and an estimated weight equivalent to that of nine elephants, or around 33 to 65 metric tons (36 to 72 short tons), assuming 3.6 to 7.3 metric tons (4 to 8 short tons) per elephant.

In 2016, using equations that estimate body mass based on the circumference of the humerus and femur of quadrupedal animals, it was estimated to be 39.5 metric tons (43.5 short tons) in weight. In 2019, Gregory S. Paul estimated the mass of A. giganteus in the 45 to 55 metric tons (50 to 61 short tons) range, based on newer titanosaur reconstructions. In 2020 Molina-Pérez and Larramendi estimated its length at 30.5 meters (100 ft) and its weight similar to Paul's estimation at 45 metric tons (50 short tons). Due to the incompleteness of the remains, any size estimates are subject to a large amount of error.

=== "Antarctosaurus" jaxarticus and "Antarctosaurus" brasiliensis ===
"Antarctosaurus" jaxarticus and "Antarctosaurus" brasiliensis are both known from very fragmentary remains.

"Antarctosaurus" jaxarticus is known from a single femur which was briefly reported as resembling a femur attributed to Jainosaurus (then called "Antarctosaurus" septentrionalis). Paleontologist Teresa Maryańska noted that, whilst A. jaxarticus was named, it was not properly described or diagnosed. The femur possibly belongs to the titanosaur clade Lithostrotia.

The type specimen of "Antarctosaurus" brasiliensis is only known from three fragmentary bones that are titanosaurian in nature; a partial left femur GP-RD-2, a partial right humerus GP-RD-3, and an incomplete dorsal vertebra (backbone) GP-RD-4. The femur is 1.15 meters (3.8 ft) preserved and was estimated at 1.55 meters (5.1 ft) if it were completed. The humerus is 65 centimeters (2.13 ft) preserved and estimated at 95 centimeters (3.12 ft) completed. The dorsal vertebra centrum is 17 centimeters (6.7 in) long.

== Classification ==
Antarctosaurus has been included in few phylogenetic analyses, only being added to the matrix of Philip Mannion et al. in 2019. It was coded along with Vahiny, Jainosaurus, Normanniasaurus and additional non-titanosaurs. Antarctosaurus placed as sister taxon to a clade of Vahiny and Jainosaurus, consistently close to taxa of the clade Lognkosauria.

- Titanosauria
  - Andesaurus
  - - Ruyangosaurus
    - - - Daxiatitan
        - Xianshanosaurus
      - - Lithostrotia
          - Malawisaurus
          - - - Epachthosaurus
              - - - - Muyelensaurus
                    - Rinconsaurus
                  - - Pitekunsaurus
                    - - Antarctosaurus
                      - - Jainosaurus
                        - Vahiny
                - - Normanniasaurus
                  - - Lognkosauria
                      - Argentinosaurus
                      - Futalognkosaurus
                      - Mendozasaurus
                      - - Notocolossus
                        - Patagotitan
                        - Puertasaurus
            - - - Nemegtosaurus
                - Tapuiasaurus
              - - - Aeolosaurus
                  - Rapetosaurus
                - - Alamosaurus
                  - - Isisaurus
                    - - Saltasaurus
                      - - Opisthocoelicaudia
                        - - Diamantinasaurus
                          - Savannasaurus
