= Lomalatachelys =

Lomalatachelys Temporal range: Santonian–Santonian

Scientific classification
- Kingdom: Animalia
- Phylum: Chordata
- Class: Reptilia
- Order: Testudines
- Suborder: Pleurodira
- Family: Chelidae
- Subfamily: Chelinae
- Genus: †Lomalatachelys; Lapparent de Broin and de la Fuente 2001
- Species: †L. neuquina

Binomial name
- †Lomalatachelys neuquina

Extinct genus of turtles

Lomalatachelys neuquina is an extinct genus and species of chelid turtle from Argentina. The specimen was found in the Loma de La Lata zone approximately 75 km from Neuquen City in north west Patagonia, Argentina.
