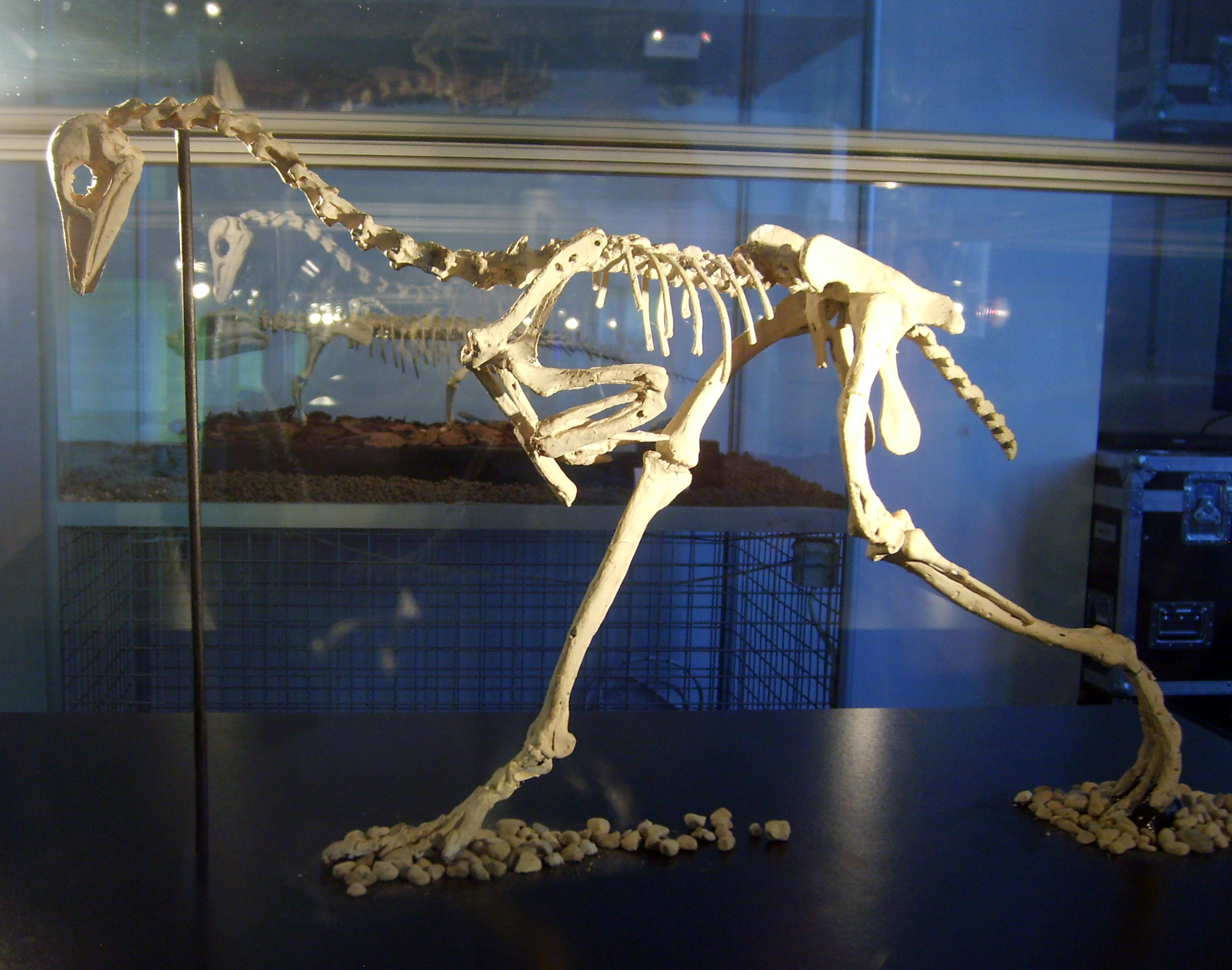
- Skeleton restoration

Scientific classification
- Kingdom: Animalia
- Phylum: Chordata
- Class: Reptilia
- Clade: Dinosauria
- Clade: Saurischia
- Clade: Theropoda
- Clade: Avialae
- Clade: Euornithes
- Clade: †Patagopterygiformes
- Family: †Patagopterygidae; Alvarenga & Bonaparte, 1992
- Genus: †Patagopteryx; Alvarenga & Bonaparte, 1992
- Species: †P. deferrariisi

Binomial name
- †Patagopteryx deferrariisi Alvarenga & Bonaparte, 1992

= Patagopteryx =

Patagopteryx Temporal range: Late Cretaceous, 85 Ma

Extinct genus of dinosaurs

Patagopteryx is an extinct monotypic genus of euornithean dinosaurs that lived during the Late Cretaceous, around 80 mya, in what is now the Sierra Barrosa in northwestern Patagonia, Argentina. About the size of a chicken, it is the earliest known unequivocal example of secondary flightlessness: its skeleton shows clear indications that the ancestors of Patagopteryx were flying animals, though other studies find earlier diverging theropods to be secondarily flightless.

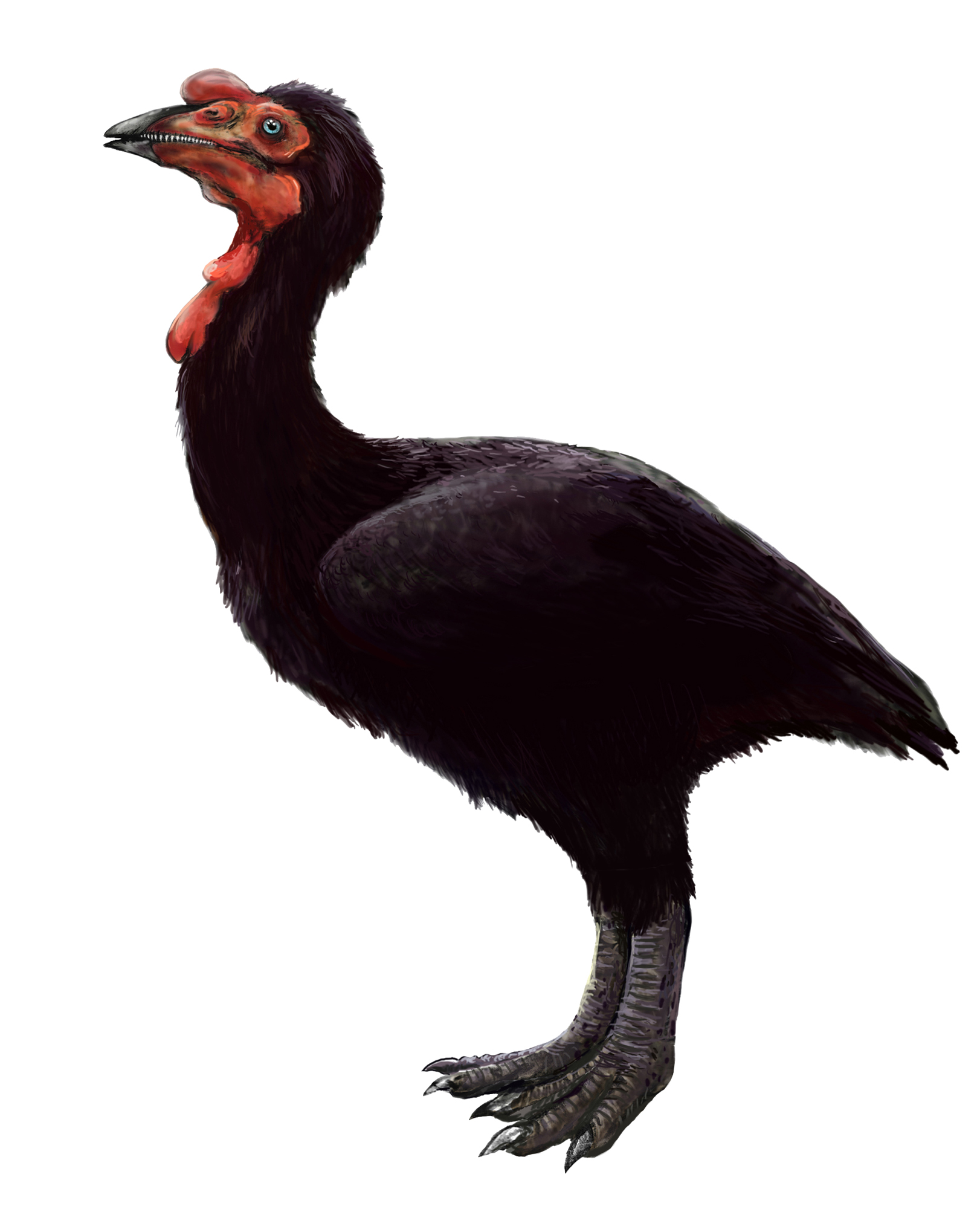
Restoration

Located in strata of the Santonian Bajo de la Carpa Formation, the original remains were discovered by Oscar de Ferrariis, Director of the Natural History Museum of the Comahue National University in Neuquén around 1984–5. He passed them onto noted paleontologist José Bonaparte, who described the species Patagopteryx deferrariisi in 1992.

== Characteristics ==
Patagopteryx had feet with fused bones, much like modern birds. The animal did not have a furcula (wishbone), meaning it could not have had the muscles necessary for flying. The legs had very short femurs, characteristic of a running animal. The second toe had a curved claw, but it does not appear to have been used as a weapon. It was omnivorous, and probably traveled in flocks across the plains of South America.
