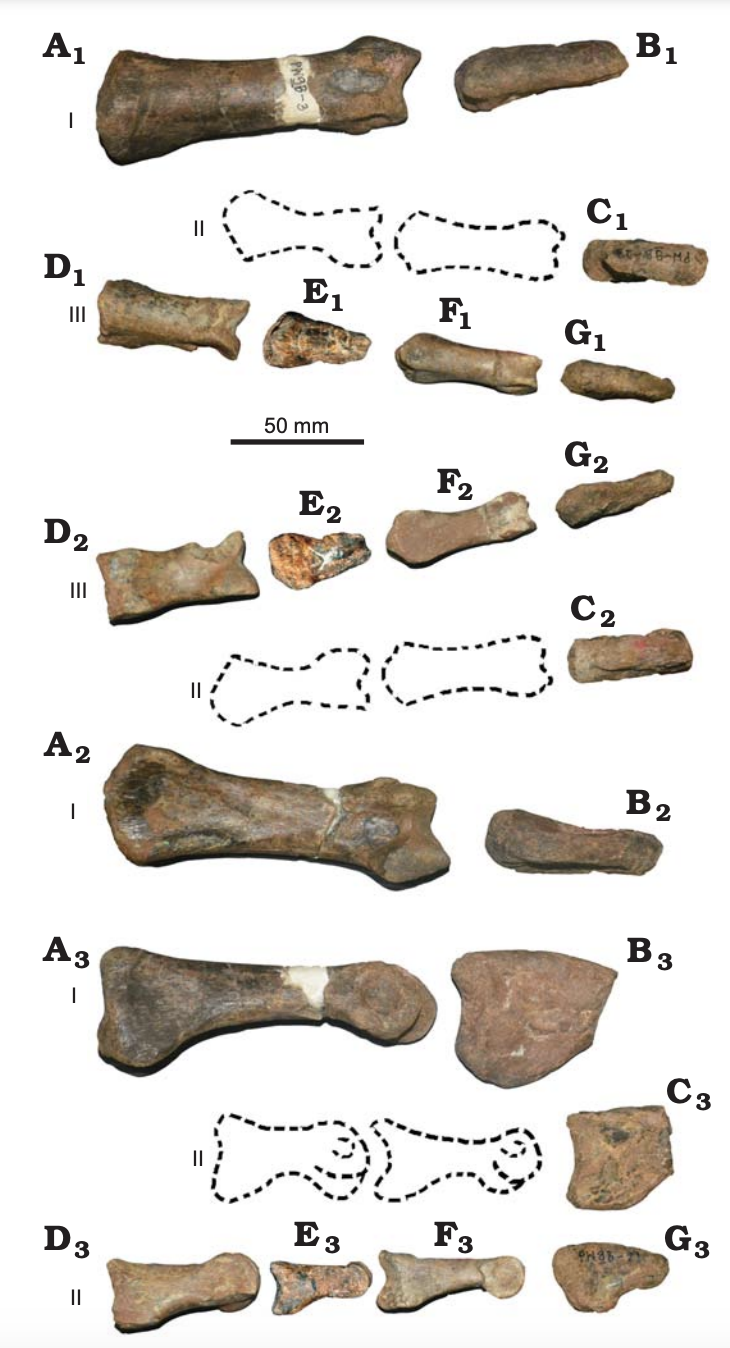
- The finger bones of the holotype of Phuwiangvenator

Scientific classification
- Kingdom: Animalia
- Phylum: Chordata
- Class: Reptilia
- Clade: Dinosauria
- Clade: Saurischia
- Clade: Theropoda
- Clade: †Megaraptora
- Genus: †Phuwiangvenator; Samathi et al., 2019

Type species
- †Phuwiangvenator yaemniyomi Samathi et al., 2019

= Phuwiangvenator =

Phuwiangvenator Temporal range: Early Cretaceous ~125 to 120 Ma - Late Barremian

Extinct genus of dinosaurs

Phuwiangvenator (/fuˈwɛŋvɪnɑːtər/) is an extinct genus of megaraptoran theropod that lived during the Early Cretaceous period in what is now Thailand. It contains only the type species, P. yaemniyomi. The generic name of Phuwiangvenator comes from the Phu Wiang mountains, where the holotype was discovered, and the Latin word "venator" meaning hunter. The specific name, "yaemniyomi", is in honor of Sudham Yaemniyom, who was a historical paleontologist from Thailand and the first person to discover fossils there.

== Discovery ==
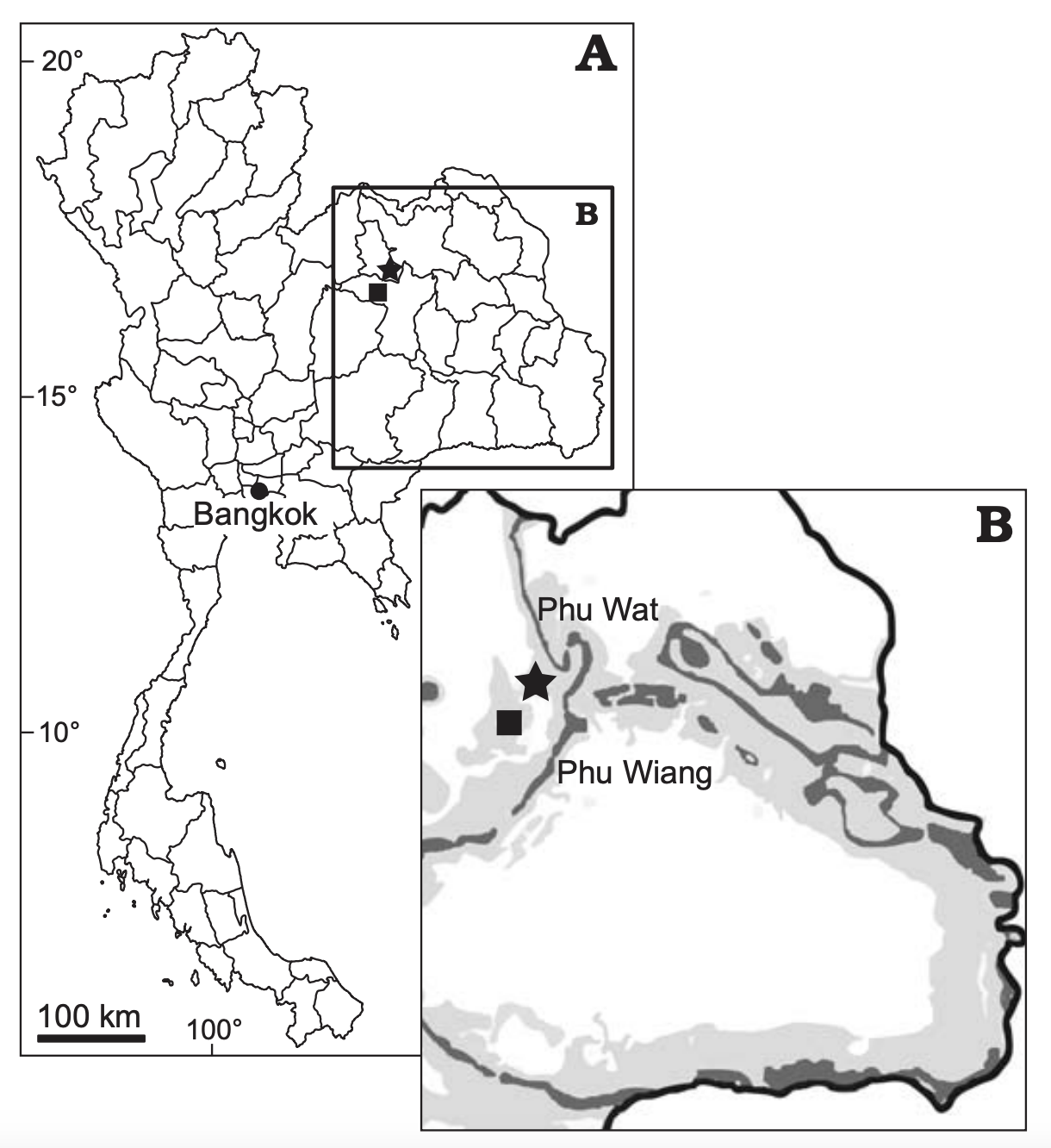
A map of Thailand with the location of the Phu Wiang locality in the inset

The holotype specimen of Phuwiangvenator, designated SM-PW9B, is a partially-complete skeleton consisting of a dorsal vertebra, three sacral vertebrae, a right metacarpal, right manual phalanges and unguals, both tibiae, the left astragalocalcaneum, several left metatarsals, and several right pedal phalanges and unguals. It was discovered in 1993 by a team led by Preecha Sainongkham in the Sao Khua Formation of Khon Kaen province in Thailand. At the time of this discovery, Sainongkham was working at the Phu Wiang Dinosaur Museum. The specimen was transported to the Sirindhorn Museum in the town of Non Buri, which is near the locality where the fossils were discovered. The fossils were prepared and remained in the museum's collection until 2019 when Adun Samathi, Phornphen Chanthasit, and P. Martin Sander published a formal description, which was accompanied by a description of the closely related taxon, Vayuraptor.

A few years after the description of the holotype, another specimen was discovered in the collections at the Sirindhorn Museum. This was described in 2022 by Adun Samathi (one of the original describers), Suravech Suteethorn, Nakorn Pradit, and Varavudh Suteethorn, the latter of whom was part of the original team which uncovered the holotype. They concluded, based on the reported type locality from which the specimen was retrieved as well as several characteristics of the bones themselves, that these bones likely belonged to the same individual animal as the holotype specimen. These additional elements were named as the topotype and were given the designation SM-PW9A. This specimen included both ends of the left fibula, several of the left metatarsals, and the distal ends of the right metatarsals. One of the metatarsals was later discovered to contain a fracture, which was studied and published on in 2023.

The discovery of Phuwiangvenator in Thailand is used by its describers to suggest an Asian origin of megaraptora. They state that the existence of Vayuraptor in Thailand and Fukuiraptor in Japan are also evidence of this.

== Description ==
The authors of its original description estimate that Phuwiangvenator was probably about 6 metres (20 ft) long in life. From what is known of the skeleton, it likely had proportions similar to the related taxon Australovenator, which is known from slightly more complete remains. The authors name two autapomorphies for Phuwiangvenator. The first of these are short furrows on the ventral side of the sacral vertebrae on the front and rear ends. The other autapomorphy is a sloping rim of the fourth metatarsal which is angled away from the middle of the body at the dorsal end. This sloping fourth metatarsal is additionally unique in having the lowest corner relative to the third metatarsal of any known theropod.

Vertebrae

Phuwiangvenator is only known from four vertebrae, one from the dorsal area and three from the sacrum. These vertebrae, as a whole, share numerous affinities with other large theropods. The dorsal vertebra is hourglass-shaped when viewed from above (or below), which is similar to the vertebrae of Fukuiraptor, Aerosteon, and numerous other avetheropods. In particular, the centrum of the only preserved dorsal vertebra does not have a pleurocoel or any lateral ridges, which resembles the condition observed in Gualicho, a theropod of controversial affinities. The three sacral vertebrae which are preserved are all fused and were damaged significantly during fossilization. However, the centra are well-preserved enough to show one of the key autapomorphies of the genus, the saci (or furrows) on the anterior and posterior portion of the bone.

Hands

Most of the preserved finger bones have deep and well-defined attachment sites for ligaments, which resemble those found in the theropods Kileskus and Australovenator.

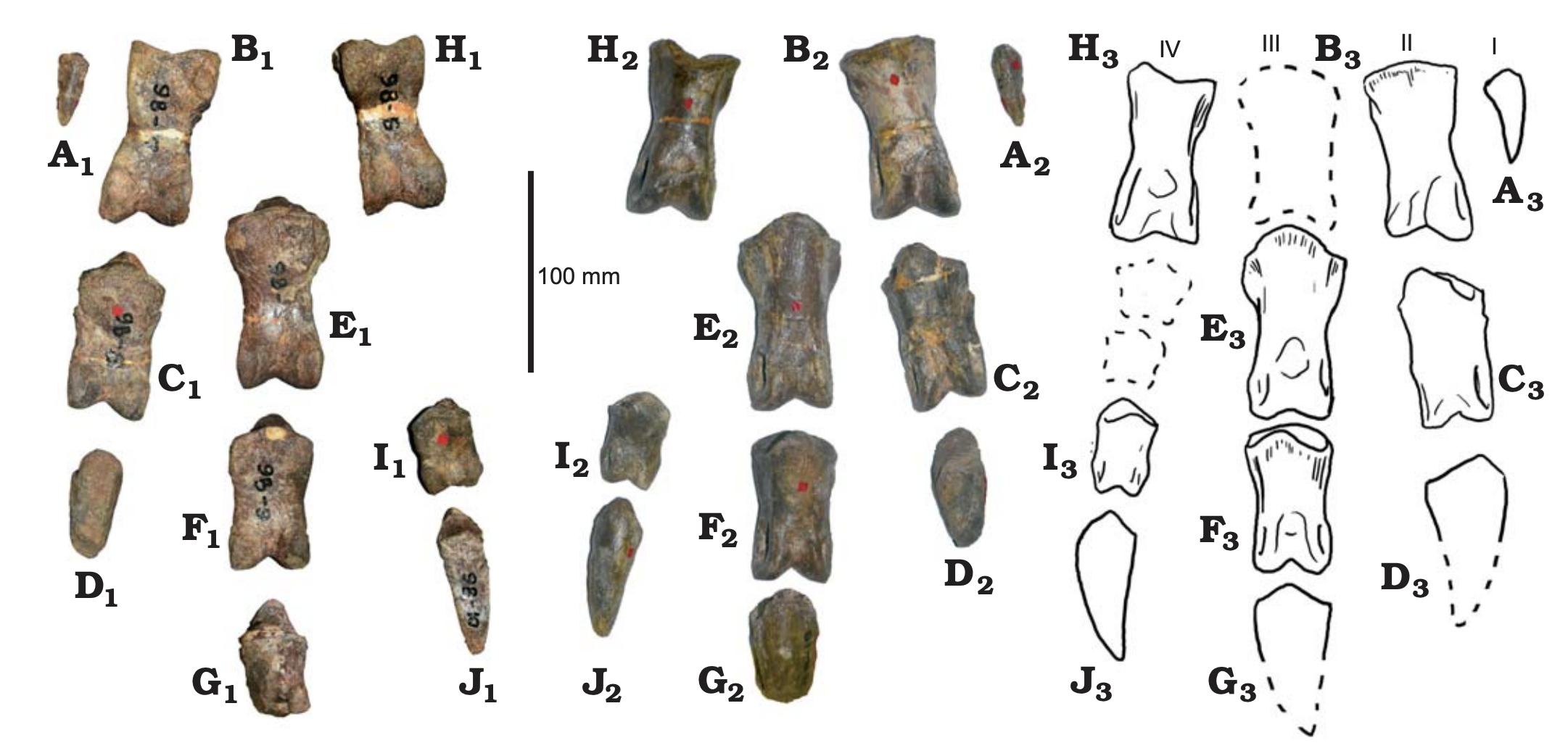
The preserved toe bones and claws of Phuwiangvenator

Legs

The leg bones share numerous marked similarities with other megaraptorans. The tibia is more than twelve times longer than its mid-length anteroposterior width, which is a synapomorphy of megaraptorans and other coelurosaurs. There are also several characteristics of the astragalus and the metatarsals which resemble those of Australovenator. There is one major exception to the megaraptoran affinities of the holotype's leg bones; the anterolateral process of the lateral condyle is sharply curved downward, which is a condition seen in Neovenator and numerous tyrannosaurids. This led the authors of the paper to suggest that this trait, and other characteristics of the leg bones may be more widespread among theropods than was previously thought. In their subsequent analysis of the topotype material, Samathi and colleagues draw comparisons between the metatarsals of Phuwiangvenator with those of numerous theropods including Allosaurus, Concavenator, Neovenator, and Suchomimus. They use this to suggest that the condition seen in the species represents the ancestral condition of all avetheropods, rather than the derived condition seen in megaraptorids.

== Classification ==
=== Phylogeny ===
Samathi and colleagues performed a phylogenetic analysis in their description of Phuwiangvenator and Vayuraptor based on the data set used by Apesteguía and colleagues in their 2016 description of Gualicho. In their analysis, they added the two new taxa from their description as well as the contemporaneous theropod Siamotyrannus and removed the problematic Santanaraptor from their data set. They recovered Phuwiangvenator as a basal member of megaraptora with the following synapomorphies for the group: a ventral groove on the first manual phalanx, a transversely compressed first manual ungual, a prominence on the anterior surface of the distal end of the tibia, a lateral extension of the astragalus, and a flattened sacrum. Notably, they recovered Vayuraptor as a non-megaraptoran coelurosaur, which has not been recovered by subsequent analyses. The strict consensus tree from their analysis is shown below.

- Coelurosauria
  - Siamotyrannus
  - Chilantaisaurus
  - Gualicho
  - - Vayuraptor
    - - Tyrannoraptora
        - Tanycolagreus
        - Compsognathidae
        - Maniraptoriformes
        - Tyrannosauroidea
      - Megaraptora
        - Phuwiangvenator
        - - Fukuiraptor
          - Megaraptoridae
            - Megaraptor
            - Orkoraptor
            - Aerosteon
            - Australovenator

A more recent phylogenetic analysis to include Phuwiangvenator was the one which accompanied the description of Maip in 2022. The analysis of the authors, led by Alexis Aranciaga Rolando, included every taxon confidently assigned to megaraptora including an unnamed specimen from the Griman Creek Formation (called the "Lightning Claw" by some publications) and another unnamed specimen from the Bajo Barreal Formation. Their analysis of Megaraptora differs from the initial only in the exact classification of Vayuraptor and the inclusion of more taxa, which the authors state led to a more resolved tree consistent with previous analyses.

- Coelurosauria
  - Maniraptoriformes
  - - Compsognathidae
    - - Tyrannosauroidea
      - - Megaraptora
          - Phuwiangvenator
          - - Vayuraptor
            - Fukuiraptor
            - Megaraptoridae
              - Lightning Ridge megaraptoran
              - - Australovenator
                - "Clade A"
                  - Aoniraptor
                  - - Bajo Barreal megaraptoran
                    - - Megaraptor
                      - - Murusraptor
                        - "Clade B"
                          - Aerosteon
                          - Tratayenia
                          - Orkoraptor
                          - Maip

In 2024, Andrea Cau published a comprehensive analysis of theropod phylogeny using a novel analytical method to test the effects of ontogeny on the phylogenetic position of various taxa. This was based on an earlier publication by Cau in which he hypothesized that the enigmatic European taxa Juratyrant, Scipionyx, and Sciurumimus (which are known to be juvenile specimens), may not be juvenile compsognathids, but rather juvenile megalosauroids or allosauroids. The 2024 analysis recovered a novel result, which placed Phuwiangvenator and the closely related Vayuraptor within the family Coeluridae, which had previously been considered a wastebasket taxon. Cau also recovered a variety of disparate taxa to be a member of this clade including Shishugounykus, Fukuivenator, and Migmanychion, which had previously been recovered as maniraptorans. An abbreviated form of the relevant section of Cau's analysis is shown below.

- Tyrannoraptora
  - Tyrannosauroidea
  - Maniraptoromorpha
    - - Ornitholestes
      - Maniraptoriformes
    - Coeluridae
      - Coelurus
      - Phuwiangvenator
      - Shishugounykus
      - Vayuraptor
      - - Fukuivenator
        - Migmanychion

=== Possible synonymity ===
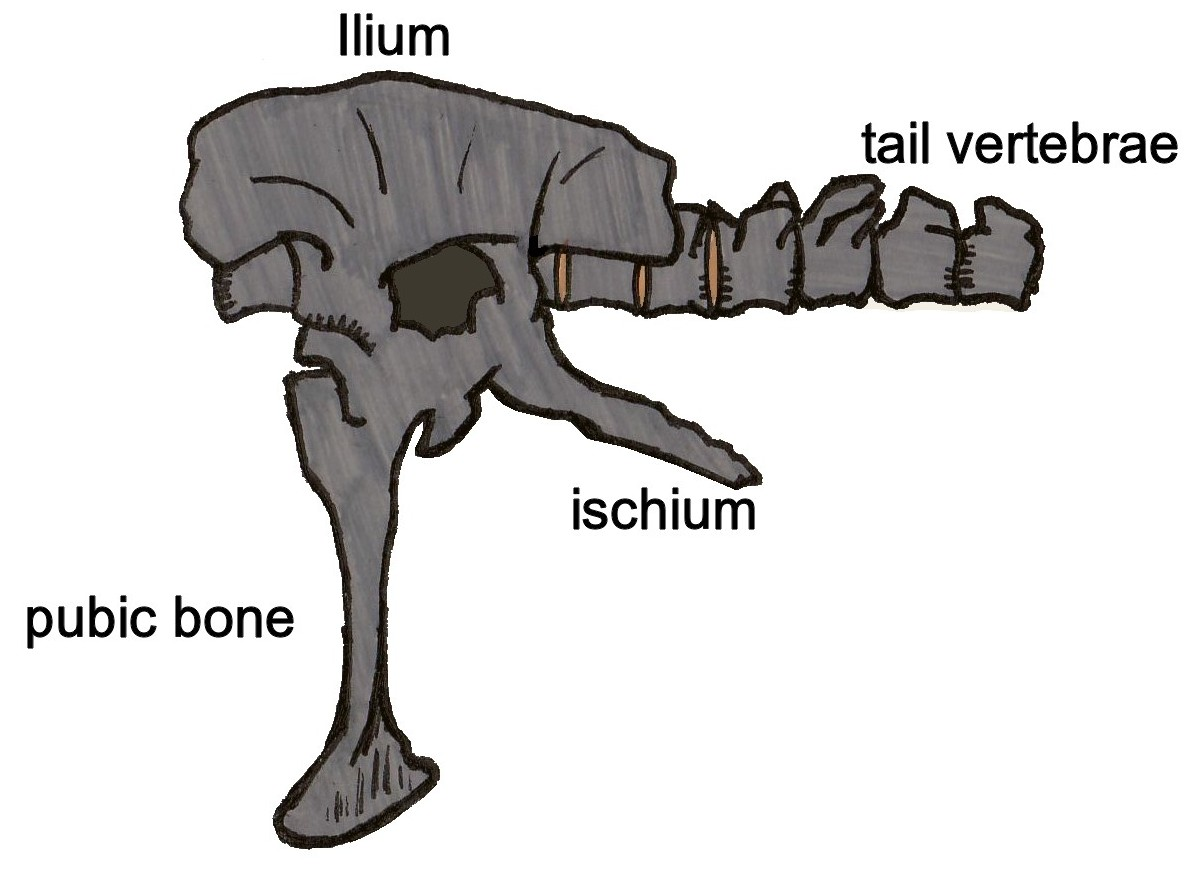
The known material of Siamotyrannus, which coexisted with Phuwiangvenator

There are three mid-sized theropods which have been discovered so far in the Sao Khua Formation, all of which are known from relatively incomplete remains. These are: Phuwiangvenator, Vayuraptor, and Siamotyrannus. The authors who described the former two were careful to draw numerous distinctions between all three taxa to ensure that they none of the three are junior synonyms of the others. The distinctions they draw between Phuwiangvenator and Siamotyrannus are as follows: the dorsal vertebra of the former is longer than it is tall, whereas in the latter they are much taller in relation to their length and the rims of the sacral centra of Siamotyrannus are much more convex than in Phuwiangvenator.

The distinctions between Phuwiangvenator and Vayuraptor which they outline are as follows: the cranioproximate process of the astragalus is much more pronounced in Vayuraptor and they note that Vayuraptor had two grooves on the body of the astragalus whereas Phuwiangvenator only had one. The final distinction between the two are the lack of an upward curving process of the lateral condyle in Vayuraptor, which is one of the autapomorphies of Phuwiangvenator. This last trait was also observed in all ontogenetic stages of Allosaurus, which the authors state implies that the absence of this trait in Vayuraptor means that the distinction is probably not the result of ontogeny.

== Paleobiology ==
=== Arm musculature ===
In 2023, Alexis M. Aranciaga Rolando and colleagues published an analysis of the inferred forelimb musculature of megaraptorans. Their reasoning for pursuing this analysis was the uniquely large forearms of megaraptorans that were not seen in any other group of large theropods in the Late Cretaceous. The analysis focuses mostly on the derived members of megaraptoridae, but they comment on the muscular and tendinous attachment sites on the bones of Phuwiangvenator. They outline several key differences between the manual phalanges and unguals of Phuwiangvenator and those of younger megaraptorans like Megaraptor, Maip, and Australovenator. These differences are concentrated in the first finger of the hand, which in derived megaraptorans hosts a single giant claw which is presumed to have served a purpose in hunting or feeding. The first claw of Phuwiangvenator lacks the well-developed furrows which are present on the proximal extension of the claw. In other species, these are thought to have been attachment sites for powerful muscles, enabling greater control and flexibility of the finger movements of these animals.

=== Pathology ===
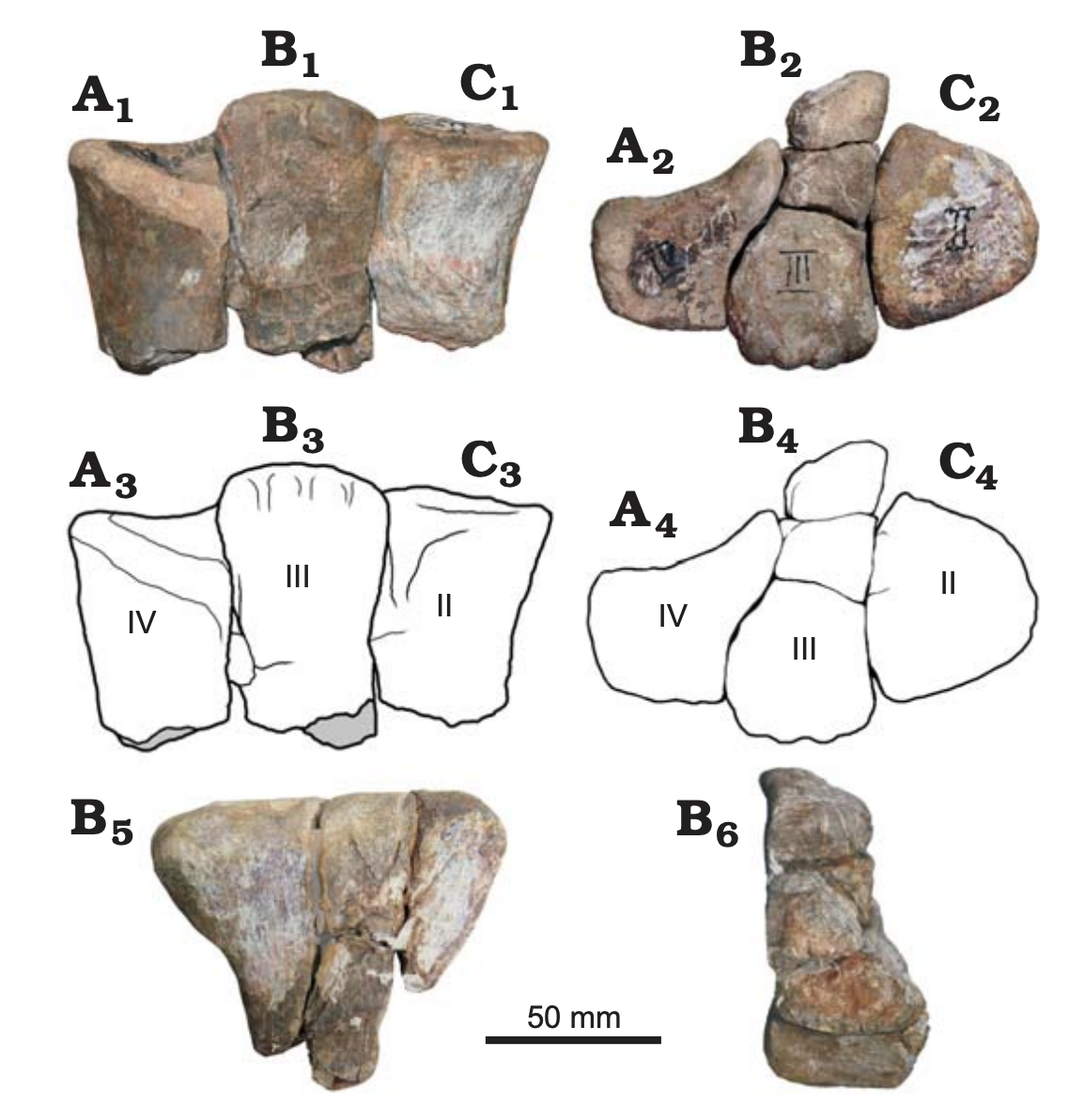
The metatarsals of the holotype, with the fracture visible (B5)

One of the metatarsals of the holotype of Phuwiangvenator was found to have signs of a greenstick fracture when analyzed by Samathi and colleagues in 2022. They inferred that this fracture is not taphonomic because of the texture of the bone, which is smooth on the medial side, but is very calloused on the lateral side. These are interpreted as signs of the fracture being healed, which implies that the animal survived this injury. The bone itself is also twisted, which would not be the normal condition because the second metatarsal would have been in the center of the foot in life. Samathi and colleagues compare this fracture to other known pathologies on theropod bones, including those seen in specimens Allosaurus and Yangchuanosaurus. From these comparisons, they conclude that the injury was likely caused by an external blunt force. Other features of the bone determined by computer tomography led the authors to conclude that the animal was not yet fully grown when it died.

Samathi and colleagues suggest several possible causes of the fracture. They first suggest a blow from the tail club of an ankylosaur, but they discard this hypothesis because no ankylosaur remains are known from the Early Cretaceous of Thailand. Possible competition or combat with another large theropod is also suggested, because there are several large theropods known from nearby localities, but they state that there is no direct evidence for this and it is impossible to determine without additional evidence. They conclude that the most likely explanation is that the animal hit its foot into a hard object such as a rock or possibly fell over to cause the type of incomplete fracture which is observed.

Evidence for severe pathologies being healed has been used by some authors to infer herding behavior in extinct animals. There are known associations of large theropods (i.e. Albertosaurus and Mapusaurus), so the authors state that it is possible that Phuwiangvenator exhibited similar behaviors. However, they also suggest that the animal may have simply survived for a short time after the injury and lived with a limp.

== Paleoecology ==
=== Diet ===
None of the skull of Phuwiangvenator has been preserved, but the animal is presumed to have been carnivorous. However, it does not have the same specialized arm musculature to aid in feeding as other megaraptorans.

=== Paleoenvironment ===
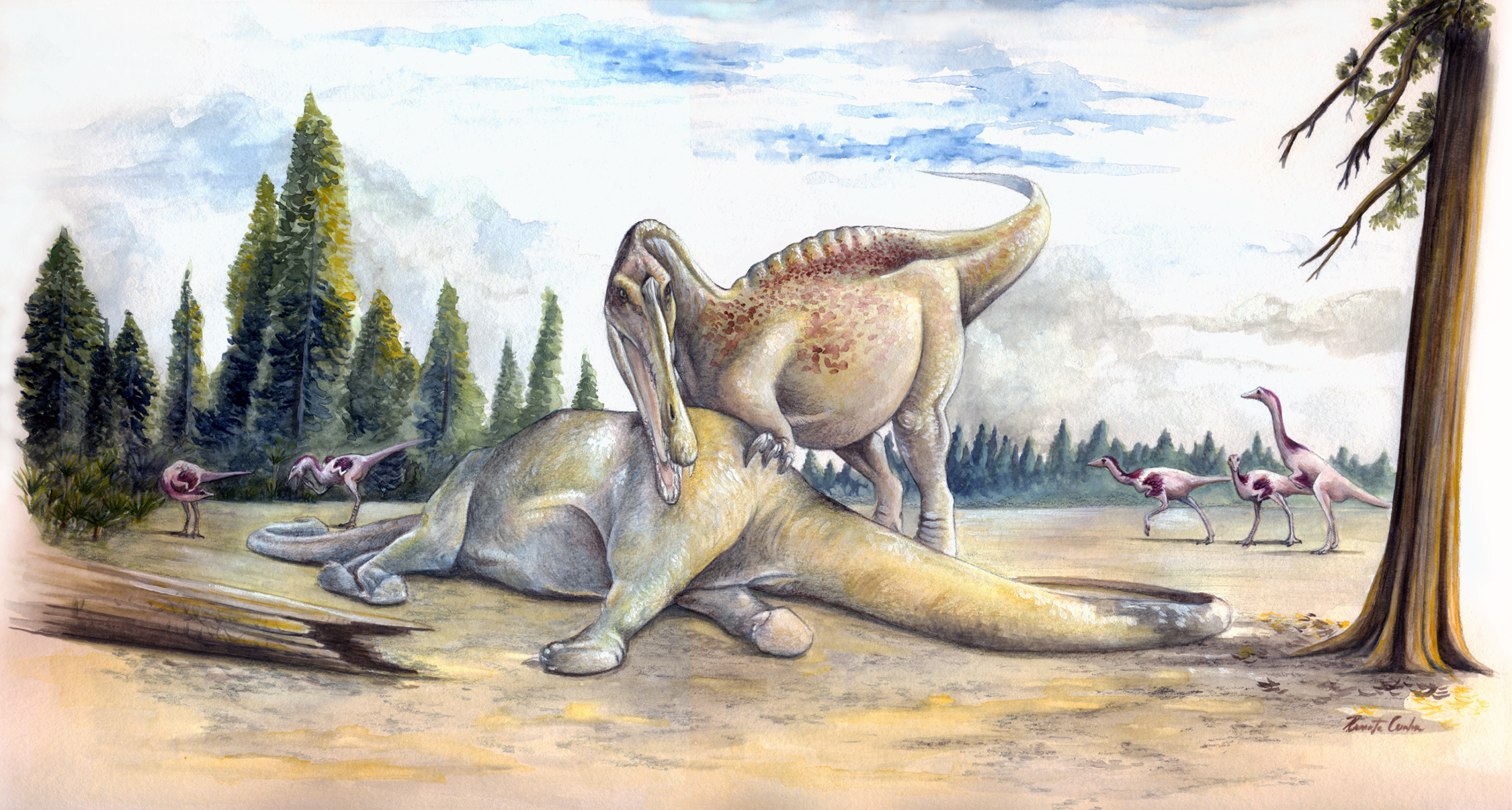
A life reconstruction of some animals which coexisted with Phuwiangvenator

The Sao Khua Formation has thus far only yielded continental fossils, with no evidence of marine fossils or marine sediments. There have historically been reports of ichthyosaur and plesiosaur teeth from the Sao Khua Formation, but these have now been identified as belonging to crocodyliformes, which are mostly non-marine during the Cretaceous. The sediments of the Sao Khua Formation are composed of red clays, mudstones, sandstones, siltstones, and conglomerate rocks, which indicate a fluvial environment which also possessed lakes, floodplains, and braided channels.

=== Contemporary fauna ===
Of all the Mesozoic formations in northeastern Thailand, the Sao Khua has the most abundant and diverse fossils. In addition to Phuwiangvenator and Vayuraptor, the region was host to numerous other theropods including the spinosaurid Siamosaurus, the large theropod Siamotyrannus, an unnamed spinosaurid, and an unnamed carcharodontosaurid. The area was also home to numerous small theropods including the ornithomimosaur Kinnareemimus and an unnamed compsognathid. Numerous sauropods are also known from the area including Phuwiangosaurus and several unnamed forms. However, there have yet to be any ornithischians discovered from the formation.

Freshwater life is abundant in the Sao Khua Formation. These include the neosuchians Siamosuchus, Sunosuchus, and Theriosuchus, numerous species of turtles, amiiform fish, several hybodontiform sharks, and freshwater bivalves. There is also an indeterminate pterosaur known from the formation.

== See also ==
- 2019 in archosaur paleontology
- Aptian extinction
- Khorat Group
- List of Asian dinosaurs
- Paleontology in Thailand
