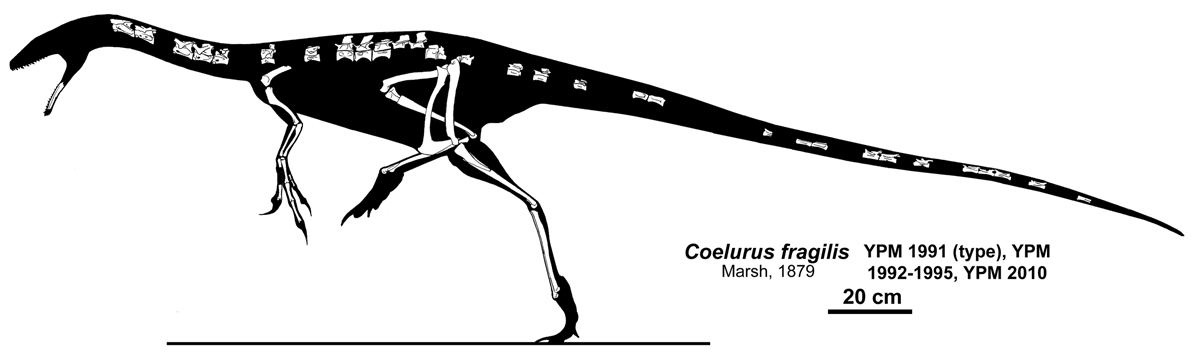
- Reconstructed skeleton of Coelurus

Scientific classification
- Kingdom: Animalia
- Phylum: Chordata
- Class: Reptilia
- Clade: Dinosauria
- Clade: Saurischia
- Clade: Theropoda
- Clade: Tyrannoraptora
- Family: †Coeluridae; Marsh, 1881

Genera
- Aorun?; Coelurus (type); Fukuivenator?; Migmanychion?; Ornitholestes?; Phuwiangvenator?; Shishugounykus?; Tanycolagreus?; Tugulusaurus?; Vayuraptor?

= Coeluridae =

Coelurids Temporal range: Late Jurassic, 153–150 Ma

Extinct family of dinosaurs

Coeluridae is a historically unnatural group of generally small, carnivorous dinosaurs from the late Jurassic Period. For many years, any small Jurassic or Cretaceous theropod that did not belong to one of the more specialized families recognized at the time was classified with the coelurids, creating a confusing array of 'coelurid' theropods that were not closely related. Although they have been traditionally included in this family, there is no evidence that any of these primitive coelurosaurs form a natural group with Coelurus, the namesake of Coeluridae, to the exclusion of other traditional coelurosaur groups.

== Classification ==
Before the use of phylogenetic analyses, Coeluridae and Coelurosauria were taxonomic wastebaskets used for small theropods that did not belong to other groups; thus, they accumulated many dubious genera. As late as the 1980s, popular books recognized over a dozen "coelurids", including such disparate forms as the noasaurid Laevisuchus and the oviraptorosaurian Microvenator, and considered them descendants of the coelophysids. A wastebasket Coeluridae lingered into the early 1990s in some sources (and appears in at least one 2006 source) but since then it has only been recognized in a much reduced form.

In 2003, O.W.M. Rauhut, using a cladistic analysis, found Coeluridae to include Coelurus (Late Jurassic, North America), Compsognathus (Late Jurassic, Europe), Sinosauropteryx (Early Cretaceous, Asia) and an unnamed Compsognathus-like form (Early Cretaceous, South America; this dinosaur has since been placed in the new genus Mirischia). Rauhut considered coelurids to be a monophyletic group of basal coelurosaurs, characterized by evolutionary reversals in some aspects of the vertebrae to the more primitive theropod condition. However, he and other authors have not since found this result. Phil Senter proposed in 2007 that Coelurus and Tanycolagreus were the only coelurids, and were actually tyrannosauroids.

Coeluridae received a formal phylogenetic definition in 2015, when it was defined as all species more closely related to Coelurus fragilis than to Proceratosaurus bradleyi, Tyrannosaurus rex, Allosaurus fragilis, Compsognathus longipes, Ornithomimus edmontonicus, or Deinonychus antirrhopus by Hendrickx, Hartman and Mateus. It remains unclear whether or not this group contains any species other than Coelurus itself, and while Tanycolagreus is often included, support for this relationship has been weak in most of the studies that recovered it.

In 2024, Cau recovered Coeluridae as the basalmost family of maniraptoromorphs, including few of its traditional members; in addition to Coelurus, it contains Shishugounykus (traditionally a basal alvarezsaur), Phuwiangvenator and Vayuraptor (sometimes considered to be early megaraptorans), Fukuivenator (sometimes considered to be a basal therizinosaur), and Migmanychion. The results of his phylogenetic analysis are displayed in the cladogram below:

- Maniraptoromorpha
  - Coeluridae
    - Vayuraptor
    - Shishugounykus
    - Phuwiangvenator
    - Coelurus
    - - Migmanychion
      - Fukuivenator
  - - Ornitholestes
    - Maniraptoriformes
