= Migmanychion =

Migmanychion Temporal range: Early Cretaceous, 121 Ma
- Reconstruction based on Fukuivenator, a possible relative, with known material in white

Scientific classification
- Kingdom: Animalia
- Phylum: Chordata
- Class: Reptilia
- Clade: Dinosauria
- Clade: Saurischia
- Clade: Theropoda
- Clade: Maniraptora
- Genus: †Migmanychion; Wang et al., 2023
- Species: †M. laiyang

Binomial name
- †Migmanychion laiyang Wang et al., 2023

Genus of maniraptoran dinosaur

Migmanychion (meaning "claw mixture") is an extinct genus of maniraptoran theropod dinosaur from the Early Cretaceous Longjiang Formation of China. The genus contains a single species, Migmanychion laiyang, known from an incomplete left forelimb.

== Discovery and naming ==
M. laiyang type locality in Inner Mongolia, China

The Migmanychion laiyang holotype specimen, LY 2022JZ3001, was discovered in sediments of the Longjiang Formation (Pigeon Hill locality), near Baoshan in Morin Dawa Daur Autonomous Banner of Inner Mongolia, China. The specimen consists of rib fragments and a partial left arm with a complete hand, preserved on a slab and counterslab.

In 2023, Wang et al. described Migmanychion laiyang as a new genus and species of maniraptoran theropod based on these fossil remains. The generic name, "Migmanychion", combines the Greek words "μείγμα νυχιών", meaning "claw mixture", referencing the difference in the morphology of the manual unguals. The specific name, "laiyang", references the holotype's home at the Shandong Laiyang Cretaceous National Geological Park.

Additional fossil material found at the type locality, including an articulated pelvis and partial hindlimb, represents an individual similar in size to Migmanychion, but was not referred as it could not be proven to represent the same animal.

== Classification ==
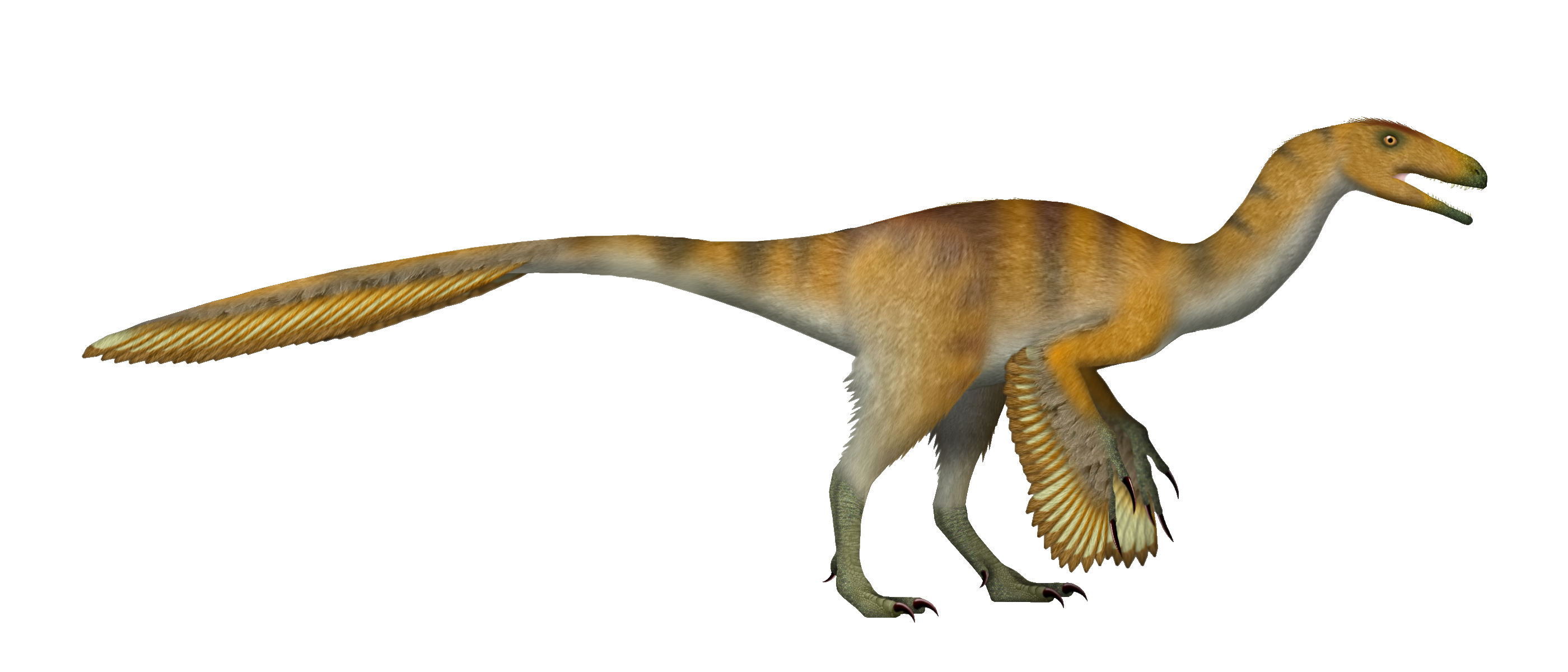
Life restoration

Migmanychion is a maniraptoran theropod, but its precise placement within the clade is unclear. Wang et al. (2023) noted several similarities between Migmanychion and Fukuivenator, a premise supported by their phylogenetic analyses. However, other positions within the Oviraptorosauria and Paraves were also recovered. They note that the discovery of additional fossil material would allow for a more confident placement. A cladogram adapted from the analysis is shown below:

- Coelurosauria
  - Tyrannosauroidea
    - Guanlong
    - - Tanycolagreus
      - Coelurus
  - - - Ornitholestes
      - - Therizinosauroidea
        - - - Migmanychion
            - Fukuivenator
          - - - Ornithomimosauria
              - Alvarezsauroidea
            - Pennaraptora
              - Oviraptorosauria
              - Paraves
                - Dromaeosauridae
                - - Troodontidae
                  - Avialae

== Paleoenvironment ==
Migmanychion was a member of the "Moqi Fauna" in the Longjiang Formation. It coexisted with other dinosaurs including the dromaeosaurid Daurlong, indeterminate paravians, and the avialans Beiguornis (an enantiornithean) and Khinganornis (an ornithuromorph), as well as fish and amphibians.
