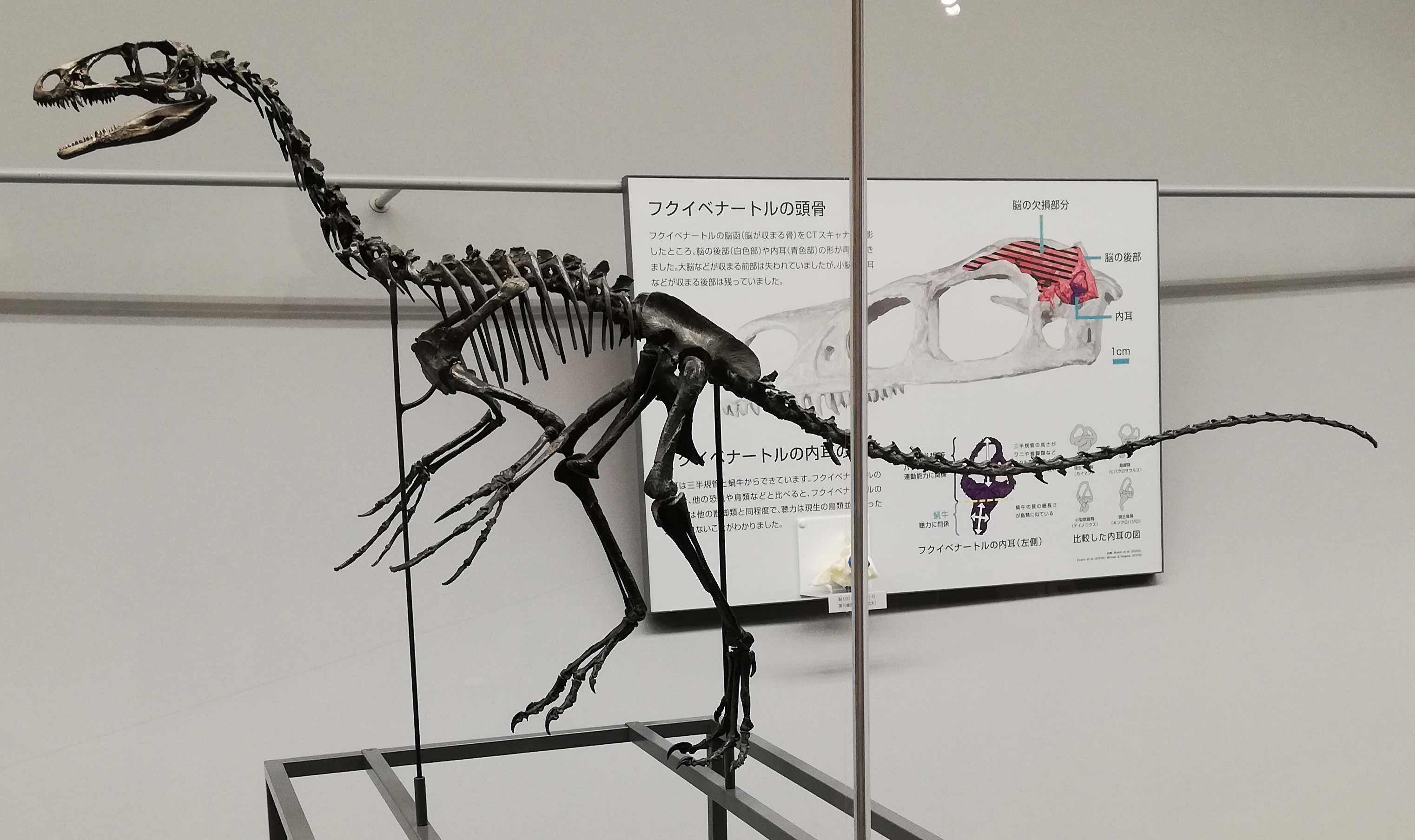
- Reconstructed skeleton

Scientific classification
- Kingdom: Animalia
- Phylum: Chordata
- Class: Reptilia
- Clade: Dinosauria
- Clade: Saurischia
- Clade: Theropoda
- Clade: Maniraptora
- Clade: †Therizinosauria (?)
- Genus: †Fukuivenator; Azuma et al., 2016
- Species: †F. paradoxus

Binomial name
- †Fukuivenator paradoxus Azuma et al., 2016

= Fukuivenator =

Fukuivenator Temporal range: Early Cretaceous, 125–115 Ma

Extinct genus of dinosaurs

Fukuivenator ("hunter of Fukui Prefecture") is an extinct genus of probable therizinosaurian theropod dinosaur from the Lower Cretaceous Kitadani Formation of Japan.

== Discovery and naming ==
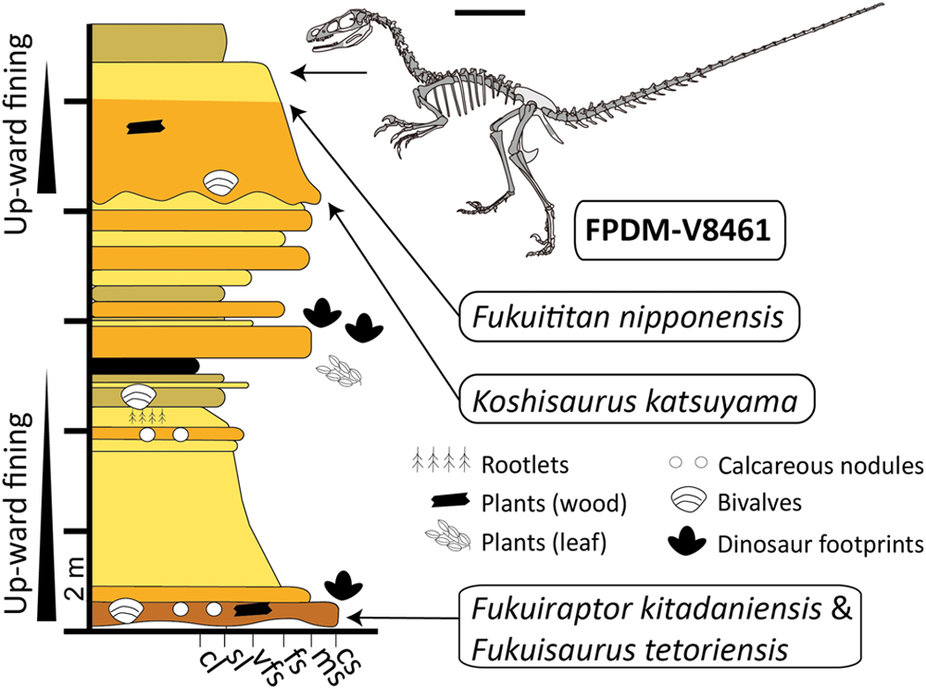
Skeletal reconstruction and stratigraphic map

The type species Fukuivenator paradoxus was named and described in 2016 by Yoichi Azuma, Xu Xing, Masateru Shibata, Soichiro Kawabe, Kazunori Miyata and Takuya Imai. The generic name combines a reference to the Fukui prefecture with Latin venator, "hunter". The specific name refers to the paradoxical combination of traits shown by the species.

The rocks in which the skeleton of Fukuivenator, holotype FPDM-V8461, was found in August 2007 belong to the Kitadani Formation, which is probably of Barremian or Aptian age. Radiometric dating of nearby rock units has given this formation an estimated age of somewhere between 127 and 115 million years old. The holotype consists of a partial skeleton with skull. The skeleton of F. paradoxus is currently the most complete non-avian dinosaur fossil found in Japan. The remains, including about 160 bones and bone fragments, were not found in articulation and were recovered from an area of 50 by 50 centimetres (20 in × 20 in).

== Description ==
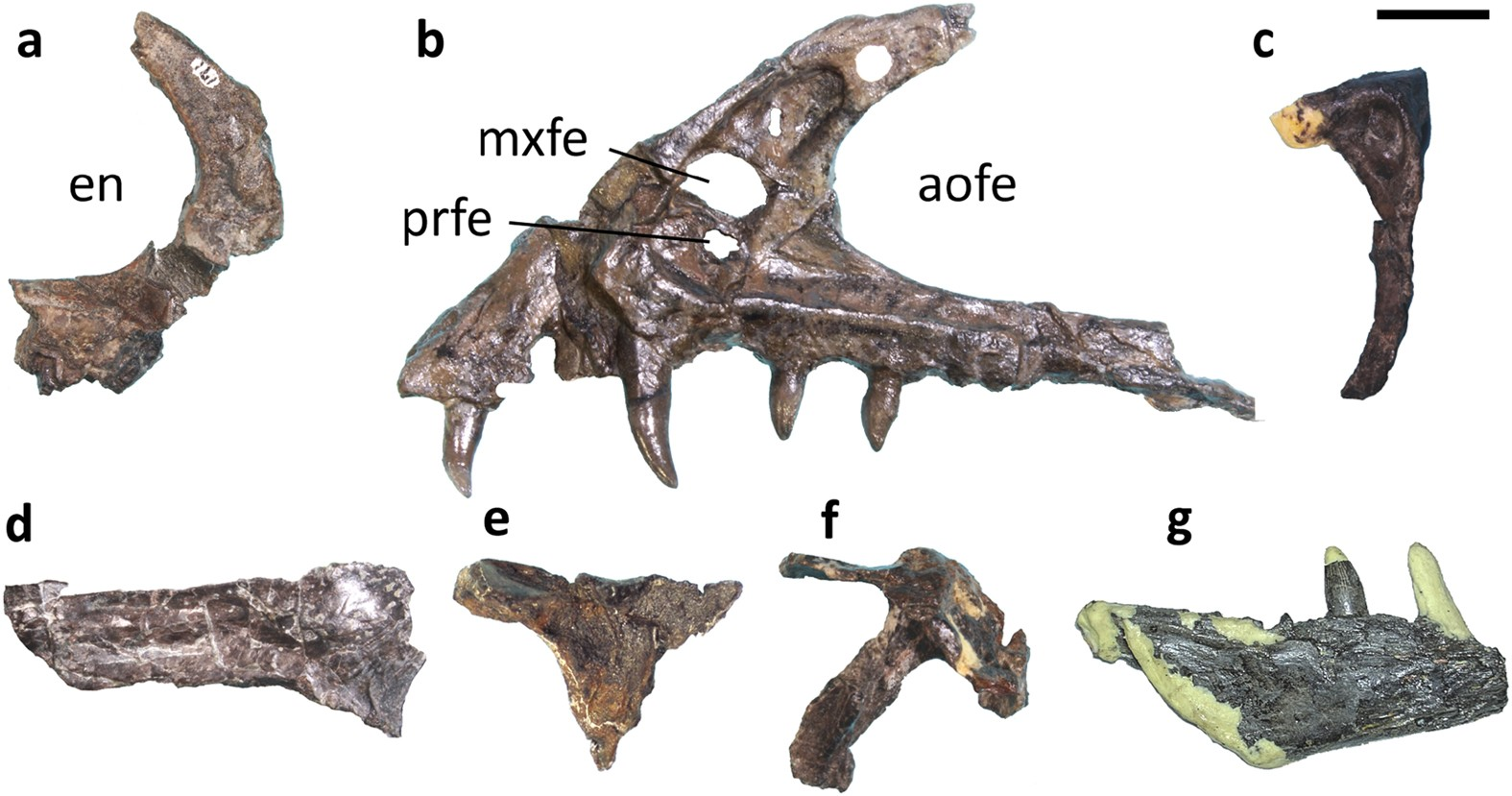
Skull elements

Fukuivenator had an estimated length of 2.45 metres (8.0 ft) and an estimated weight of 25 kilograms (55 lb). Distinctive traits include spatulate teeth in the front praemaxillae, pointed, recurved, and unserrated teeth in the maxillae, and a long neck with elongated neck vertebrae.

== Classification ==
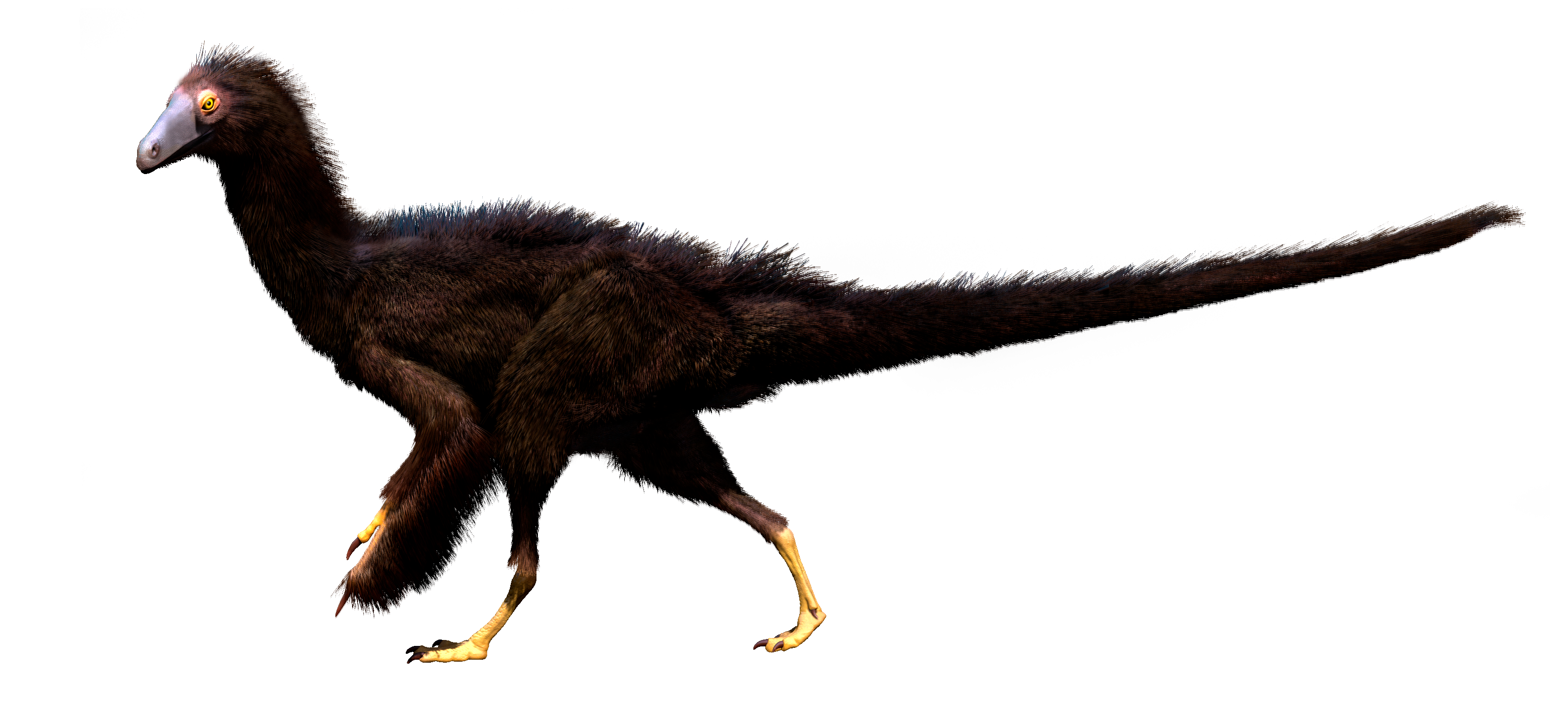
Fukuivenator restored as a basal therizinosaur

The anatomy of Fukuivenator shows a unique combination of primitive and advanced coelurosaurian features. A phylogenetic analysis performed by the research team that described Fukuivenator found it to be a primitive member of the group Maniraptoriformes, in an unresolved position equally closely related to ornithomimosaurs, maniraptorans, and Ornitholestes. Several similarities with the Dromaeosauridae were explained as a case of convergent evolution. A 2021 redescription performed phylogenetic analyses and recovered it as the most basal member of the Therizinosauria. In their description of Kayrasaurus, Liao et al. (2026) included Fukuivenator in a newly constructed phylogenetic matrix designed to analyze the evolution and relationships of therizinosaurs, which supported this position as the basalmost therizinosaurian. Their results are displayed in the cladogram below:

- Therizinosauria
  - Fukuivenator paradoxus
  - - Falcarius utahensis
    - - Eshanosaurus deguchiianus
      - - Jianchangosaurus yixianensis
        - - Kayrasaurus changliensis
          - Therizinosauroidea
            - Beipiaosaurus inexpectus
            - - Lingyuanosaurus sihedangensis
              - - Alxasaurus elesitaiensis
                - Erliansaurus bellamanus
                - Martharaptor greenriverensis
                - Bissekty Fm. therizinosauroid
                - Nanchao Fm. therizinosauroid embryo
                - - Neimongosaurus yangi
                  - - Enigmosaurus mongoliensis
                    - - Suzhousaurus megatherioides
                      - Therizinosauridae
                        ⊞
                        - - Duonychus tsogtbaatari
                          - - Nothronychus mckinleyi
                            - Nothronychus graffami
                        - - - Erlikosaurus andrewsi
                          - Nanshiungosaurus brevispinus
                          - Paralitherizinosaurus japonicus
                          - Segnosaurus galbinensis
                          - Therizinosaurus cheloniformis
                        ⊟

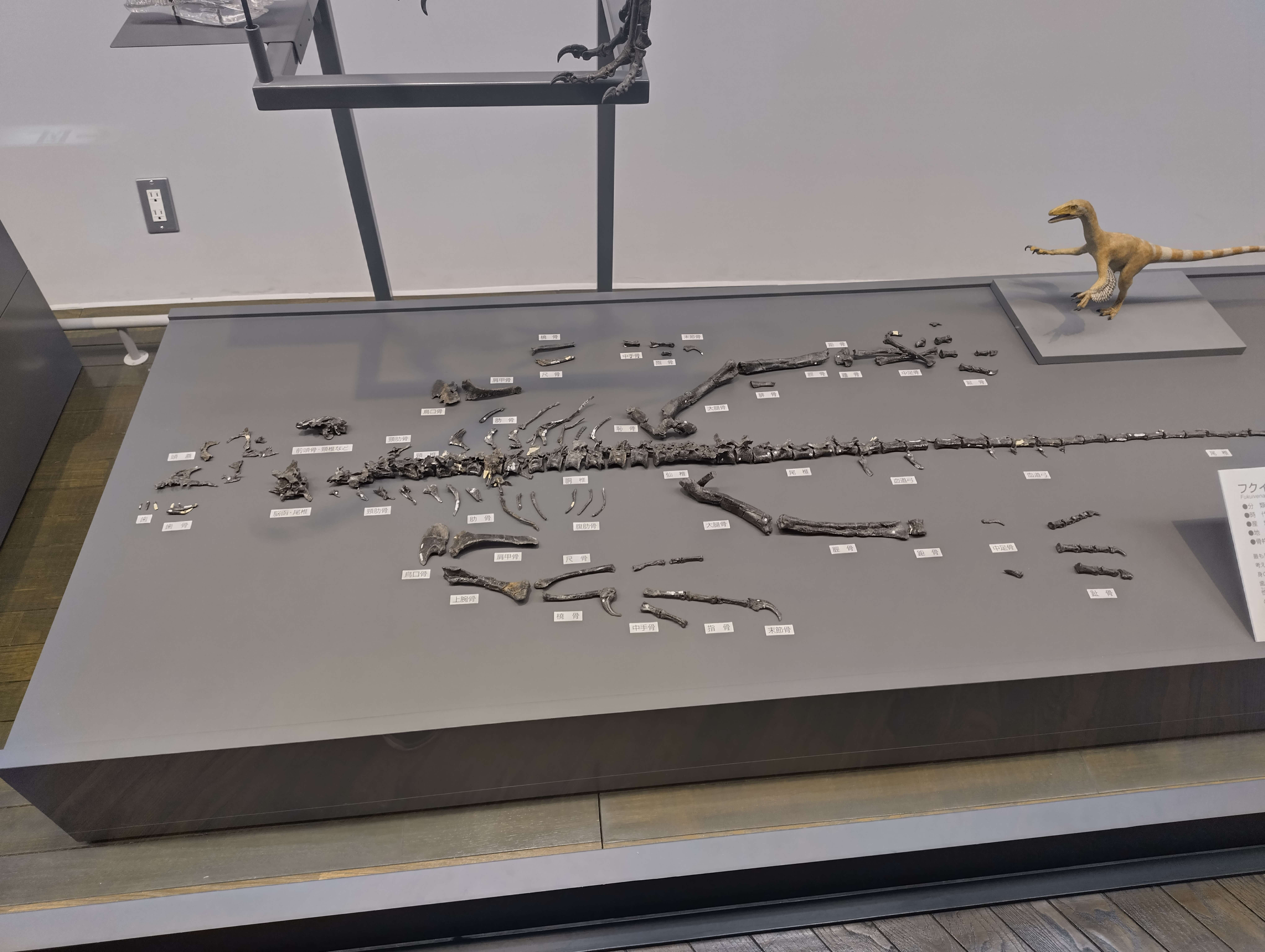
The holotype of Fukuivenator on display in Fukui, Japan

Another enigmatic maniraptoran, Migmanychion, was supported as the closest taxon to Fukuivenator based on a 2023 phylogenetic analysis that sampled theropods more broadly. These two genera were recovered as diverging one node crownward of therizinosaurs.

- Coelurosauria
  - Tyrannosauroidea
    - Guanlong
    - - Tanycolagreus
      - Coelurus
  - - - Ornitholestes
      - - Therizinosauroidea
        - - - Migmanychion
            - Fukuivenator
          - - - Ornithomimosauria
              - Alvarezsauroidea
            - Pennaraptora
              - Oviraptorosauria
              - Paraves
                - Dromaeosauridae
                - - Troodontidae
                  - Avialae

== Paleobiology ==
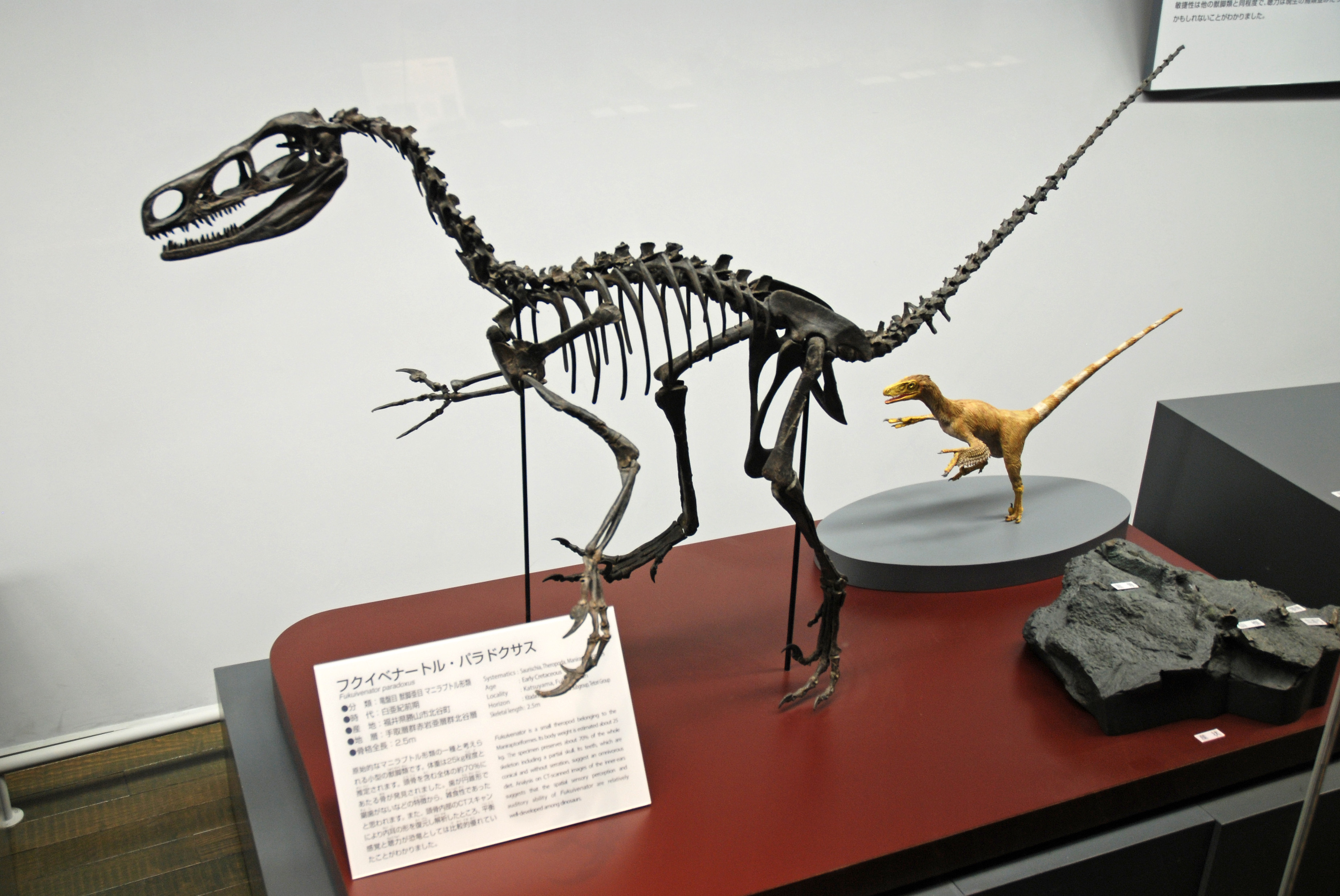
Older dromaeosaur-like skeleton reconstruction

=== Diet ===
Because of the long neck and the heterodont unserrated teeth, the probably foremost of which had flattened outer ends, the describing authors suggested that Fukuivenator was no longer a pure carnivore but had adapted itself to a herbivorous or at least omnivorous diet.

== See also ==
- 2016 in paleontology
