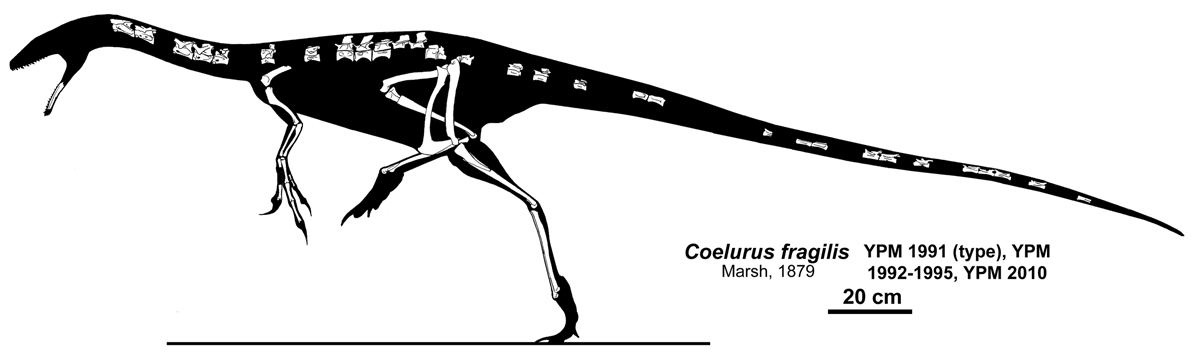
- Skeletal restoration showing known remains

Scientific classification
- Kingdom: Animalia
- Phylum: Chordata
- Class: Reptilia
- Clade: Dinosauria
- Clade: Saurischia
- Clade: Theropoda
- Family: †Coeluridae
- Genus: †Coelurus; Marsh, 1879
- Species: †C. fragilis

Binomial name
- †Coelurus fragilis Marsh, 1879

Synonyms
- Coelurus agilis Marsh, 1884; Elaphrosaurus agilis (Marsh, 1884) Russell, Beland & McIntosh, 1980

= Coelurus =

Coelurus Temporal range: Late Jurassic, 155–152 Ma

Extinct genus of dinosaurs

Coelurus is a genus of coelurosaurian dinosaur from the Late Jurassic period (mid-late Kimmeridgian faunal stage, 155–152 million years ago). The name means "hollow tail", referring to its hollow tail vertebrae (Greek κοῖλος, koilos = hollow + οὐρά, oura = tail). Although its name is linked to one of the main divisions of theropods (Coelurosauria), it has historically been poorly understood, and sometimes confused with its better-known contemporary Ornitholestes. Like many dinosaurs studied in the early years of paleontology, it has had a confusing taxonomic history, with several species being named and later transferred to other genera or abandoned. Only one species is currently recognized as valid: the type species, C. fragilis, described by Othniel Charles Marsh in 1879. It is known from one partial skeleton found in the Morrison Formation of Wyoming, United States. It was a small bipedal carnivore with elongate legs.

== History ==
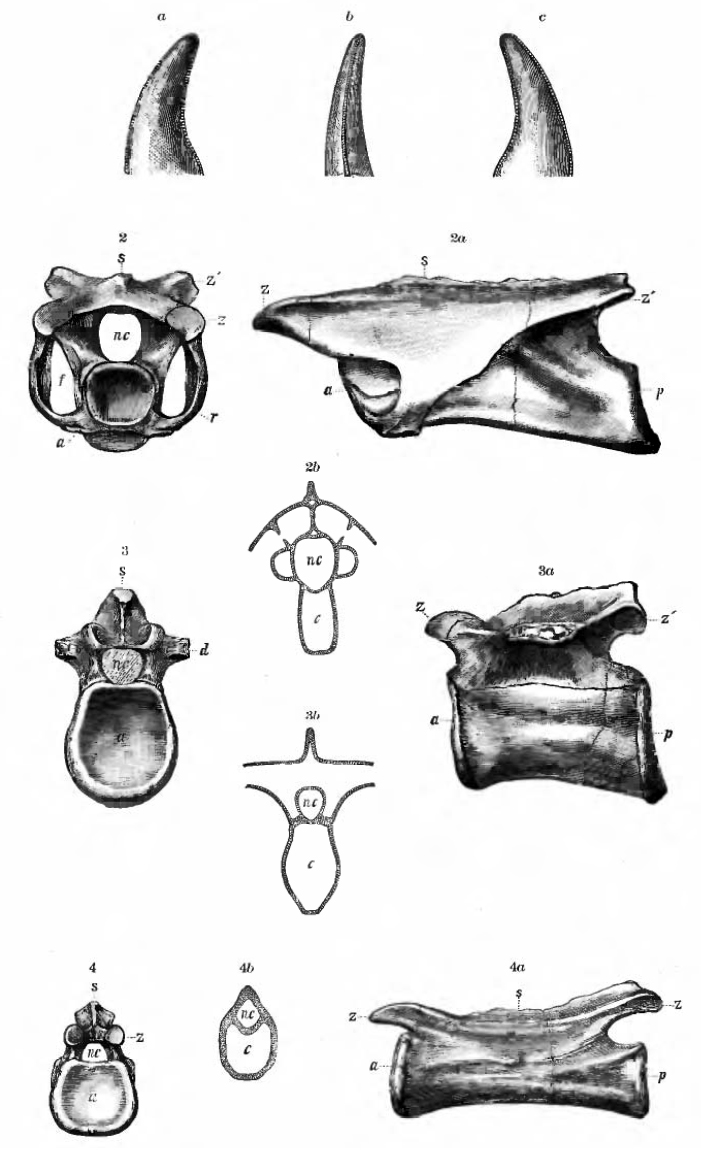
Othniel Charles Marsh's illustration of Coelurus vertebrae from 1884

Coelurus was described in 1879 by Othniel Charles Marsh, an American paleontologist and naturalist known for his "Bone Wars" with Edward Drinker Cope. At the time, he only described what he interpreted as vertebrae from the back and tail, found at the same location as the type specimen of his new genus and species Camptonotus dispar (later renamed Camptosaurus because Camptonotus was already in use for a cricket). Marsh was impressed with the hollow interiors of the thin-walled vertebrae, a characteristic that gave the type species its name: Coelurus fragilis. He thought of his new genus as an "animal about as large as a wolf, and probably carnivorous". Coelurus would prove to be the first named small theropod from the Morrison Formation, although at the time Marsh was not certain that it was a dinosaur. He returned to it in 1881 and provided illustrations of some bones, along with putting it in a new order (Coeluria) and family (Coeluridae).

From there, the story becomes more complex. Apparently, the skeleton was scattered throughout the quarry, with the remains being recovered from September 1879 to September 1880. Marsh elected to place some of the material in a new species, C. agilis, on the strength of a pair of fused pubic bones he thought belonged to an animal three times the size of C. fragilis. He returned to the genus in 1888 to add C. gracilis, based on unknown remains only represented today by a single claw bone pertaining to a small theropod from the Early Cretaceous Arundel Formation of Maryland. This species is not currently accepted as representing Coelurus in reviews of the genus, but has not been given its own genus.

Despite their professional animosity, Cope also assigned species to Coelurus; in 1887, he named fossils from the Late Triassic of New Mexico as C. bauri and C. longicollis. He later gave them their own genus, Coelophysis.

In 1903, Henry Fairfield Osborn named a second genus of small theropod from the Morrison Formation, Ornitholestes. This genus was based on a partial skeleton from Bone Cabin Quarry, north of Como Bluff. Ornitholestes became intertwined with Coelurus in 1920, when Charles Gilmore, in his influential study of theropod dinosaurs, concluded that the two were synonyms. This was followed in the literature for decades. The two genera were not formally compared, however, nor was there a full accounting of what actually belonged to Coelurus, until John Ostrom's study in 1980.

Gilmore had suspected that C. fragilis and C. agilis were the same, but Ostrom was able to demonstrate this synonymy. This greatly expanded the known material pertaining to C. fragilis, and Ostrom was able to demonstrate that Ornitholestes was quite different from Coelurus. At the time, Dale Russell had proposed that C. agilis was a species of Elaphrosaurus based on the incomplete information then published; Ostrom was also able to demonstrate that this was not the case. Additionally, he showed that one of the three vertebrae Marsh had illustrated for C. fragilis was actually a composite of two vertebrae, one of which was later shown to come from another quarry and belonged not to Coelurus but to another, unnamed small theropod. This unnamed genus would not be the last small theropod from the Morrison Formation to be confused with Coelurus; a later discovery (1995) of a partial skeleton in Wyoming was first thought to be a new larger specimen of Coelurus, but further study showed it belonged to a different but related genus, Tanycolagreus.

=== Species ===
Only one species of Coelurus, the type species C. fragilis, is still recognized as valid today, although six other species have been named over the years. C. agilis, as discussed, was named by Marsh in 1884 for what turned out to be additional parts of the skeleton of C. fragilis. Cope's C. bauri and C. longicollis, named in 1887 from Late Triassic fossils from New Mexico, were transferred by Cope in 1889 to his new genus Coelophysis. C. daviesi was named by Richard Lydekker in 1888 for Harry Seeley's Thecospondylus daviesi, a neck vertebra from the Early Cretaceous of England, but this species was later transferred to its own genus, Thecocoelurus. C. gracilis, another Early Cretaceous species, was also named in 1888. It was coined by Marsh for what seems to be an assortment of limb remains, but Gilmore could only find a single claw when he reviewed the species in 1920. This species has been proposed as outside Coelurus since the 1920s (when Gilmore assigned it to Chirostenotes), and has been regarded as a dubious species outside of Coelurus in recent reviews. Finally, during the period when Ornitholestes was thought to be the same as Coelurus, its type species was recognized as distinct by Steel, as C. hermanni.

== Description ==
Coelurus compared in size to an average adult human

Coelurus is known from most of the skeleton of a single individual, including numerous vertebrae, partial pelvic and shoulder girdles, and much of the arms and legs, stored at the Peabody Museum of Natural History; however, the relative completeness of the skeleton was not known until 1980. The fossils were recovered from Reed's Quarry 13 at Como Bluff, Wyoming. Additionally, two arm bones possibly belonging to this genus are known from the Cleveland-Lloyd Dinosaur Quarry in Utah. Its weight has been estimated at around 13 to 20 kilograms (29 to 44 lb), with a length of about 2.4 meters (7.9 ft) and a hip height of 0.7 meters (2.3 ft). From reconstructions of the skeleton, Coelurus had a relatively long neck and torso due to its long vertebrae, a long slender hindlimb due to its long metatarsus, and potentially a small slender skull.

The skull is unknown except for possibly a portion of lower jaw found at the same site as the rest of the known Coelurus material. Although it has the same preservation and coloring as the fossils known to belong to the Coelurus skeleton, it is very slender, which may mean it does not belong to the skeleton; this bone is 7.9 centimeters long (3.1 in) but only 1.1 centimeters tall (0.43 in). In general, its vertebrae were long and low, with low neural spines and thin walls to the bodies of the vertebrae. Its neck vertebrae were very pneumatic, with numerous hollow spaces on their surfaces (pleurocoels); these hollows were not evenly distributed among the vertebrae and varied in size. The neck vertebrae were very elongate, with bodies four times longer than wide, and they articulated with concave faces on both ends (amphicoely). The back vertebrae were not as elongate, lacked surface hollows, and had less developed concave faces and bodies that were hourglass-shaped. The tail vertebrae also lacked surface hollows.

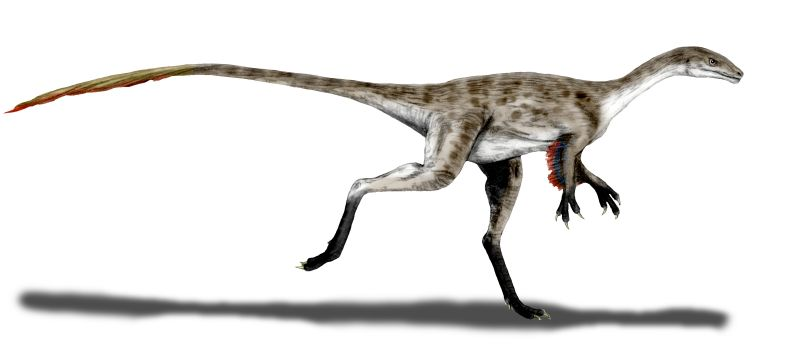
Life restoration

The only bone known from the shoulder girdle is a fragment of scapula. The upper arm had a distinct S-shaped curve in side view and was slightly longer than the forearm (11.9 centimeters [4.7 in] versus 9.6 centimeters [3.8 in]). The wrist had a semilunate carpal^{†} similar to that of Deinonychus, and the fingers were long and slender. The only bone known from the pelvic girdle is paired and fused pubis bones, which had a prominent, long "foot" at the end. The thigh bones had an S-shape when viewed from the front. The metatarsals were unusually long and slender, nearly the length of the thigh bones (the best preserved thigh bone is about 21 centimeters long [8.3 in]).

The three best-known small theropods of the Morrison Formation — Coelurus, Ornitholestes, and Tanycolagreus — were generalized coelurosaurs, and they have been mistaken for each other at various times. Now that Coelurus and Ornitholestes have been more fully described, it is possible to distinguish them by various characteristics of their anatomy. For example, they had visibly different proportions: Coelurus had a longer back and neck than Ornitholestes, and longer, more slender legs and feet. Coelurus and Tanycolagreus are more similar, but differ in a variety of details. Such details include the shape of the upper arm, forearm, and thigh bones; the location of muscle attachments on the thigh bone, proportionally longer back vertebrae; and, again, the very long metatarsus of Coelurus.

== Classification ==
Since the growth of phylogenetic studies in the 1980s, Coelurus has usually been found to be a coelurosaurian of uncertain affinities, not fitting with the better-known clades of the Cretaceous. Along with several other generalized coelurosaurians such as the compsognathids, Ornitholestes, and Proceratosaurus, it has had multiple placements around the base of Coelurosauria. The phylogenetic analysis conducted by Rauhut (2003) and Smith et al. (2007) found that Coelurus was more closely related to compsognathids than to other coelurosaurs. Oliver Rauhut (2003) proposed that Coeluridae was composed of Coelurus plus the compsognathids, but he and others have not since found the compsognathids to group with Coelurus. However, a work published by Phil Senter in 2007 following the description of Tanycolagreus found it and Coelurus to be closely related at the base of Tyrannosauroidea. Senter proposed that Coelurus and Tanycolagreus were the only coelurids and were actually tyrannosauroids, but the phylogenetic analysis of Turner et al. (2007b) found that Coelurus was a basal coelurosaur, although more derived than the tyrannosaurids. Zanno in 2010 recovered Coelurus as a basal maniraptoran. Coelurus is sometimes put into its own family, Coeluridae, although the membership of the family has not been stable.

Before the use of phylogenetic analyses, Coeluridae and Coelurosauria were taxonomic wastebaskets used for small theropods that did not belong to other groups; thus, they accumulated many dubious genera. As late as the 1980s, popular books recognized over a dozen "coelurids", including such disparate forms as the noasaurid Laevisuchus and the oviraptorosaurian Microvenator, and considered them descendants of the coelophysids. A wastebasket Coeluridae lingered into the early 1990s in some sources (and appears in at least one 2006 source) but since then it has only been recognized in a much reduced form. Coeluridae received a formal phylogenetic definition in 2015, when it was defined as all species more closely related to Coelurus fragilis than to Proceratosaurus bradleyi, Tyrannosaurus rex, Allosaurus fragilis, Compsognathus longipes, Ornithomimus edmontonicus, or Deinonychus antirrhopus by Hendrickx, Hartman and Mateus. It remains unclear whether or not this group contains any species other than Coelurus itself, and while Tanycolagreus is often included, support for this relationship has been weak in most of the studies that recovered it.

Below is a cladogram placing Coelurus in Coelurosauria by Cau et al. in 2015.

- Coelurosauria
  - Zuolong
  - - Tugulusaurus
    - Tyrannoraptora
      - - Tyrannosauroidea
          - Coelurus
          - Tanycolagreus
          - - Guanlong
            - - Dilong
              - - Yutyrannus
                - Tyrannosaurus
      - - Sinocalliopteryx
        - - Compsognathidae
          - Maniraptoriformes

In their comprehensive revision of Santanaraptor and Mirischia, Delcourt et al. (2025) recovered Coelurus and Nqwebasaurus as the basalmost members of Ornithomimosauria based on both equal and implied weight phylogenetic analyses.

== Paleobiology and paleoecology ==
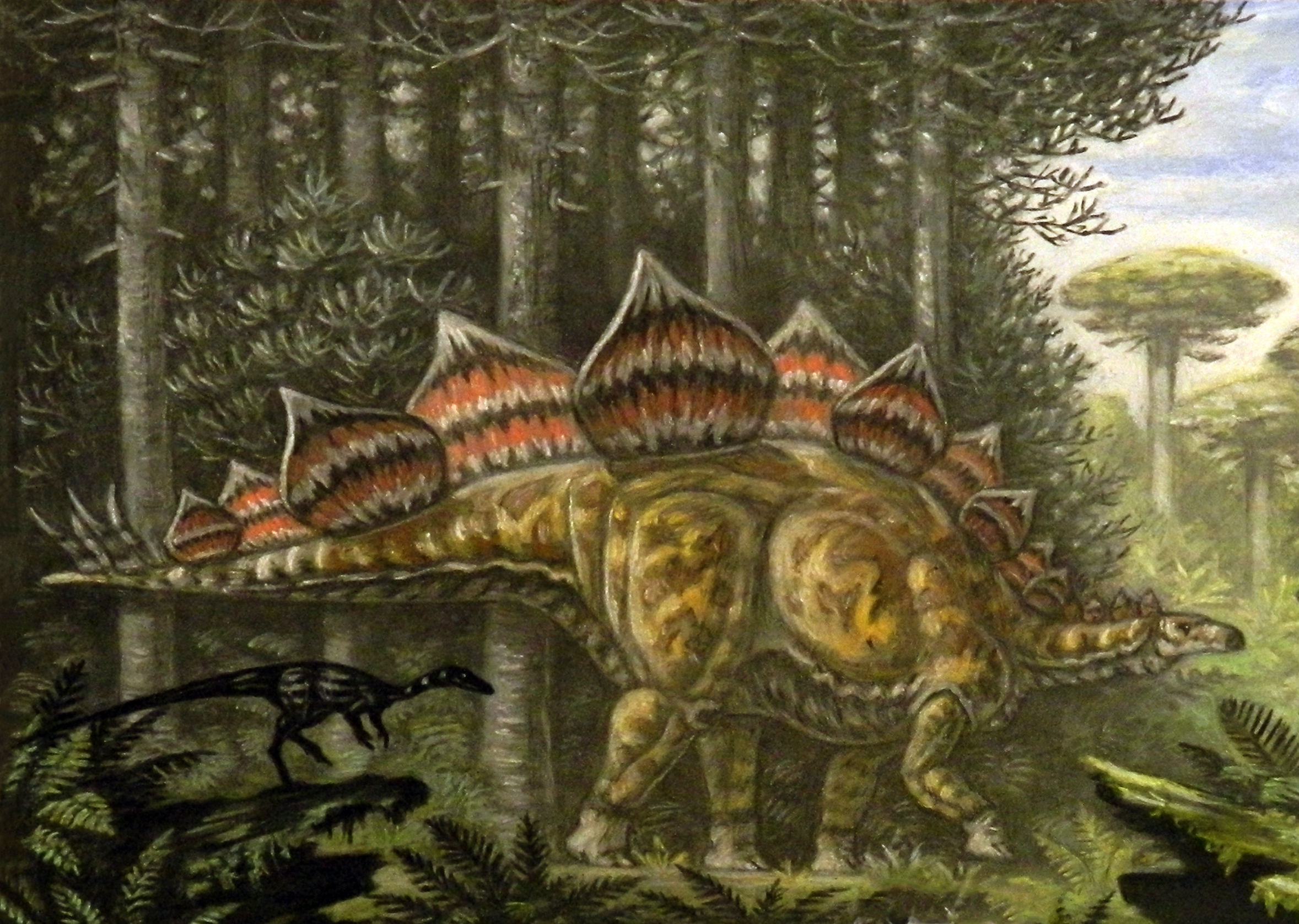
Coelurus (lower left) and Stegosaurus in environment

The type specimen of Coelurus agilis, YPM 2010 (now considered a synonym of Coelurus fragilis) was recovered in the Brushy Basin member of the Morrison Formation, in Albany County, Wyoming. The specimen was collected by Reed in gray sandstone and brown/green claystone that were deposited during the Kimmeridgian stage of the Jurassic period, approximately 157 to 152 million years ago. This specimen is housed in the collection of the Yale Peabody Museum in New Haven, Connecticut.

The Morrison Formation is interpreted as a semiarid environment with distinct wet and dry seasons, and flat floodplains. Vegetation varied from river-lining forests of conifers, tree ferns, and ferns, to fern savannas with rare trees. It has been a rich fossil hunting ground, holding fossils of green algae, fungi, mosses, horsetails, ferns, cycads, ginkgoes, and several families of conifers. Other fossils discovered include bivalves, snails, ray-finned fishes, frogs, salamanders, turtles such as Uluops, sphenodonts, lizards, terrestrial and aquatic crocodylomorphs like Fruitachampsa, several species of pterosaur like Kepodactylus, numerous dinosaur species, and early mammals such as docodonts, multituberculates, symmetrodonts, and triconodonts. Such dinosaurs as the theropods Ceratosaurus, Allosaurus, Ornitholestes, and Torvosaurus, the sauropods Apatosaurus, Brachiosaurus, Camarasaurus, and Diplodocus, and the ornithischians Camptosaurus, Hesperosaurus, Nanosaurus, Fruitadens, Dryosaurus, and Stegosaurus are known from the Morrison. Coelurus is regarded as a small terrestrial carnivore, feeding on small prey items like insects, mammals, and lizards. It is thought to have been a fast animal, certainly faster than the similar but shorter-footed Ornitholestes. Coelurus is present in stratigraphic zones 2 and 5 of the Morrison Formation.

== Notes ==
^ † Not the same as the human lunate bone, but a wrist element with a half-moon shape.
