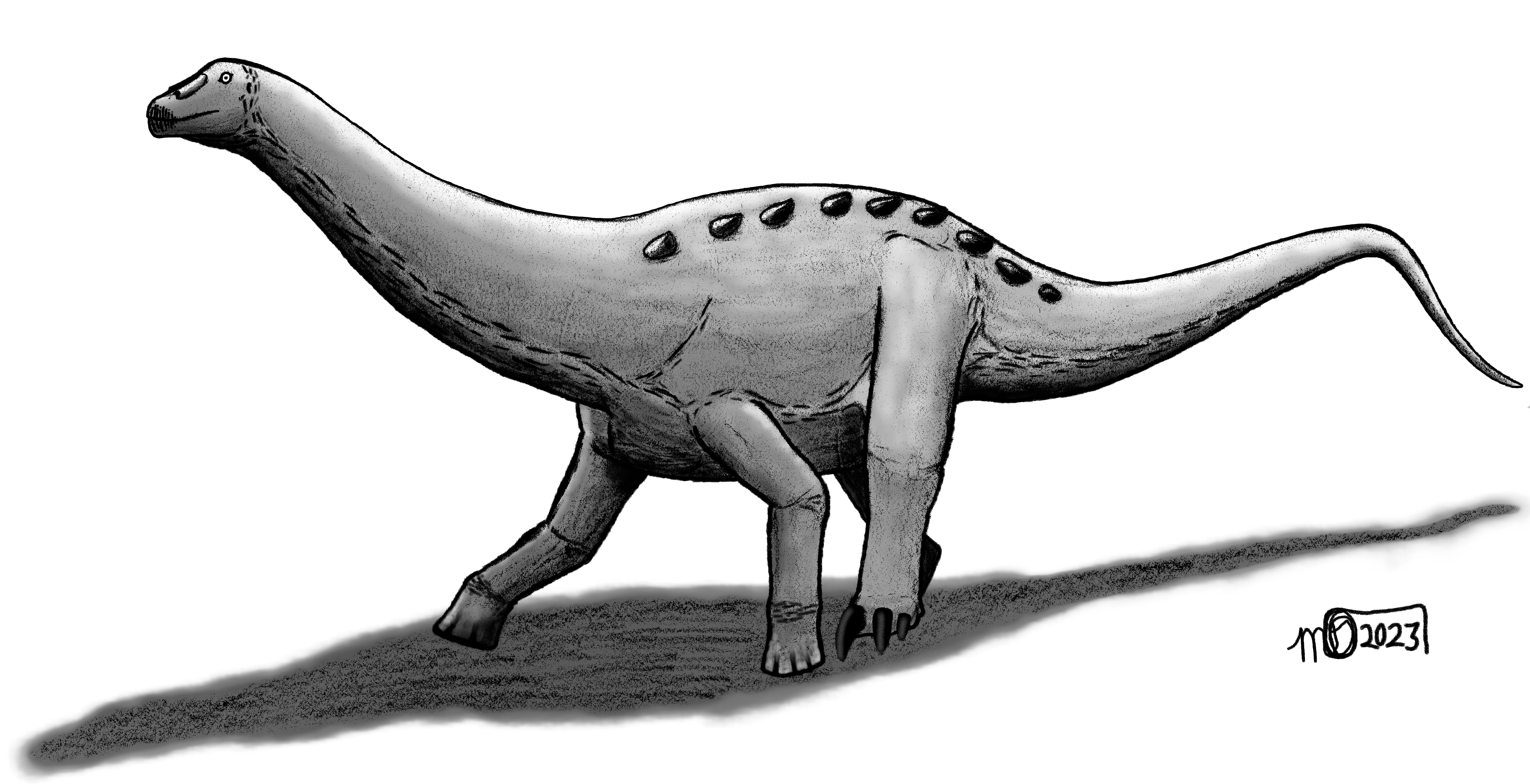
- Restoration of Igai semkhu

Scientific classification
- Kingdom: Animalia
- Phylum: Chordata
- Class: Reptilia
- Clade: Dinosauria
- Clade: Saurischia
- Clade: †Sauropodomorpha
- Clade: †Sauropoda
- Clade: †Macronaria
- Clade: †Titanosauria
- Family: †Saltasauridae
- Genus: †Igai; Gorscak et al., 2023

Type species
- Igai semkhu Gorscak et al., 2023

= Igai =

Igai Temporal range: Late Cretaceous, 74–72 Ma

Extinct genus of sauropod dinosaurs

Igai is a genus of titanosaur from the Late Cretaceous Quseir Formation of Kharga Oasis, Egypt. The type species is Igai semkhu.

== History ==
Fossils of Igai were first discovered in early November 1977 by German scientists Kal Werner Barthel and Ronald Böttcher of Technische Universität Berlin (TUB), who had been conducting research for the Sonderforschungsbereiches (Collaborative Research Center) of the TUB. These fossils were unearthed in the Kharga Oasis near the town of Baris in the Western Desert of Egypt.

This quarry corresponds to the Quesir Formation, which dates to the Campanian stage of the Upper Cretaceous period.

The holotype specimen, VB 621–640, was originally excavated in November 1977 by Karl Werner Barthel and Ronald Böttcher of Technische Universität Berlin (TUB) and sent to Germany in 27 plaster jackets. Due to preparation choices and insufficient storage, the partial skeleton's state of preservation decreased.

The specimen was first mentioned in the scientific literature in a few abstracts in the 1990s. On September 11, 2008, several dinosaur specimens from Egypt and Sudan were transferred to the Museum für Naturkunde, among them most of the Kharga specimen minus the left tibia and an isolated femur. The describers of Igai published more abstracts on it in 2017; work on the specimen was completed in September 2019. In 2023, they were named as belonging to a new genus and species of titanosaur, Igai semkhu. The generic name, "Igai", refers to a mysterious "lord of the oasis" worshipped around the Dakhla and Kharga Oases during the Old Kingdom of Egypt. The specific name, "semkhu", is Ancient Egyptian for "the forgotten", referring both to the specimen's convoluted history and the relatively recent discovery of non-marine Cretaceous vertebrates from continental Africa.

This skeleton was first mentioned in scientific literature in two abstracts in the 1990s.

In 2023, American paleontologist Eric Gorscak and colleagues scientifically described the remains and assigned them to a new genus and species of sauropod, which he Igai semkhu. The generic name Igai is a reference to the "lord of the oasis" that was worshiped by peoples of the Dakhala and Kharga Oases during the Old Kingdom and Late Period of Egypt. As for the specific name semkhu, it is derived from the Ancient Egyptian word "semekh" meaning "to forget". The collective name "the forgotten lord of the oasis" alludes to the complicated history of the holotype and the relatively recent start of latest Cretaceous non-marine vertebrate paleontology in continental Africa.

== Description ==
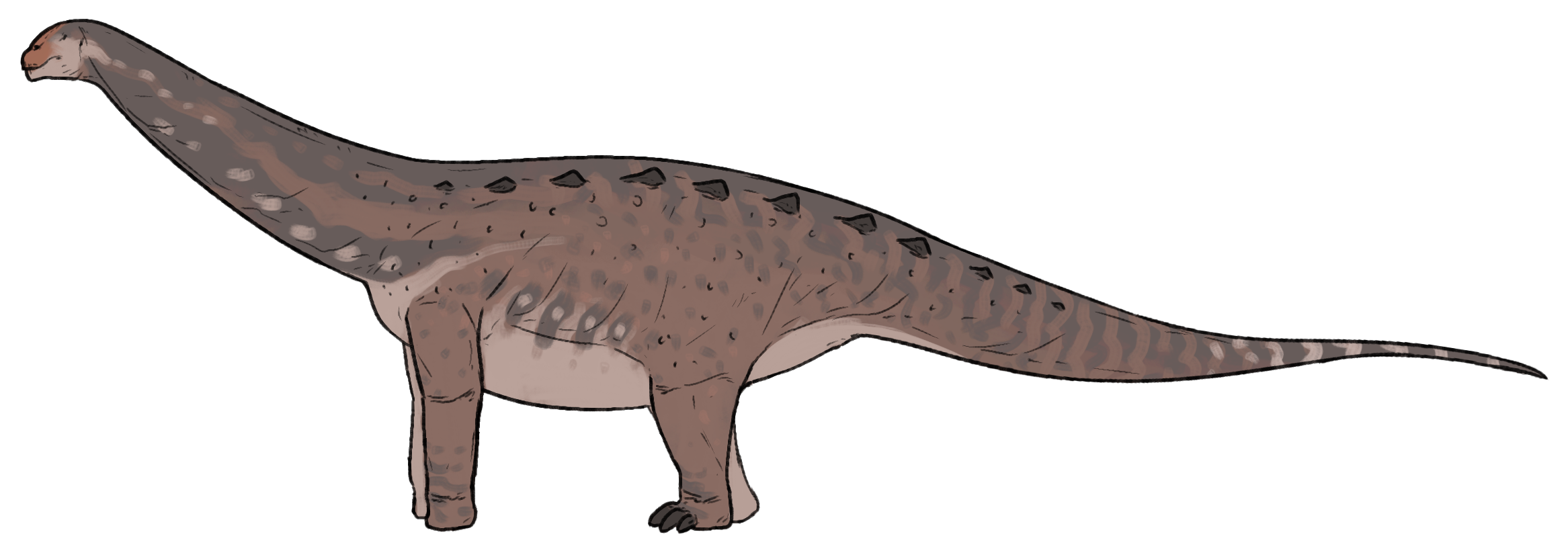
Life reconstruction

Based on comparisons with other titanosaurs, Igai has been estimated at 10–15 metres (33–49 ft) in length, larger than the sympatric Mansourasaurus which was 8–10 metres (26–33 ft) long. This reflects a trend where Late Cretaceous titanosaurs from Africa, Europe, and Arabia were small- to medium-sized; additionally, Diamantinasaurus, Epachthosaurus, and Opisthocoelicaudia approached the size of Igai.

All preserved vertebrae of Igai have opisthocoelus centra, which bear large, deep, oval-shaped pleurocoels (gaps for air sacs) on their lateral (side) surfaces. These pleurocoels are long in Igai, running across nearly the entire length of the centra. Based on CT imagery, the insides of these centra are composed of camellate (spongy bone). These traits are found in many other sauropods and were adaptations to large sauropod body sizes. The vertebrae lack a hypantrum-hyposphene articulation, as in other titanosaurs.

Igai semkhu was relatively slender by titanosaur standards. It is distinguished from other titanosaurs by various details of its limb bones. The fifth metacarpal has two distinct tubercles on its medial side, one near the proximal end and one near the distal end, that are not seen in other titanosaurs. The cnemial crest, a part of the tibia where several leg muscles attach, is smaller and less projected than in other titanosaurs, with Mendozasaurus and juvenile Rapetosaurus being the most similar in this respect. The first and second metatarsals show distinct grooves that are not seen in other titanosaurs.

== Classification ==
Igai was entered into a phylogenetic analysis and found to be in two possible positions: one as a close relative of the South American Saltasaurus and Neuquensaurus and another in an Afro-Eurasian clade that includes Lirainosaurus, Opisthocoelicaudia, and the sympatric Mansourasaurus. The authors preferred the second result since it conforms to a hypothesis that northern African taxa during the Cretaceous were more closely related to European ones while southern African taxa had more Gondwanan origins. The latter cladogram is shown below, with African taxa highlighted in red:

- Titanosauria
  - - - Tastavinsaurus
      - - Andesaurus
        - Ligabuesaurus
    - - Chubutisaurus
      - - Wintonotitan
        - - Angolatitan
          - Malarguesaurus
  - - Mnyamawamtuka
    - Lithostrotia
      - Malawisaurus
      - - Karongasaurus
        - - - Diamantinasaurus
            - - Isisaurus
              - Rapetosaurus
          - - - - Normanniasaurus
                - Tapuiasaurus
              - Rinconsauria
                - Muyelensaurus
                - - - Argyrosaurus
                    - Rinconsaurus
                  - - Bonitasaura
                    - Aeolosaurini
                      - Gondwanatitan
                      - - Overosaurus
                        - - - Aeolosaurus
                            - Trigonosaurus
                          - - Panamericansaurus
                            - Shingopana
            - Eutitanosauria
              - Patagotitan
              - - - Maxakalisaurus
                  - Paralititan
                - - - - - Baurutitan
                        - Dreadnoughtus
                      - - Alamosaurus
                        - - Abditosaurus
                          - Pellegrinisaurus
                    - - - Mendozasaurus
                        - Rukwatitan
                      - - Argentinosaurus
                        - - Futalognkosaurus
                          - Notocolossus
                  - - Atsinganosaurus
                    - - Epachthosaurus
                      - Saltasauridae
                        - - Neuquensaurus
                          - Saltasaurus
                        - - - Nemegtosaurus
                            - Opisthocoelicaudia
                          - - - Mansourasaurus
                              - Paludititan
                            - - - Ampelosaurus
                                - Igai
                              - - Lirainosaurus
                                - Lohuecotitan

== Paleoenvironment ==
Igai is known from the Quseir Formation, which preserves some of the few non-marine vertebrate remains known from the Late Cretaceous of North Africa. The fellow titanosaur Mansourasaurus is also known from this formation, found in nearby Dakhla Oasis.

== See also ==
- 2023 in paleontology
