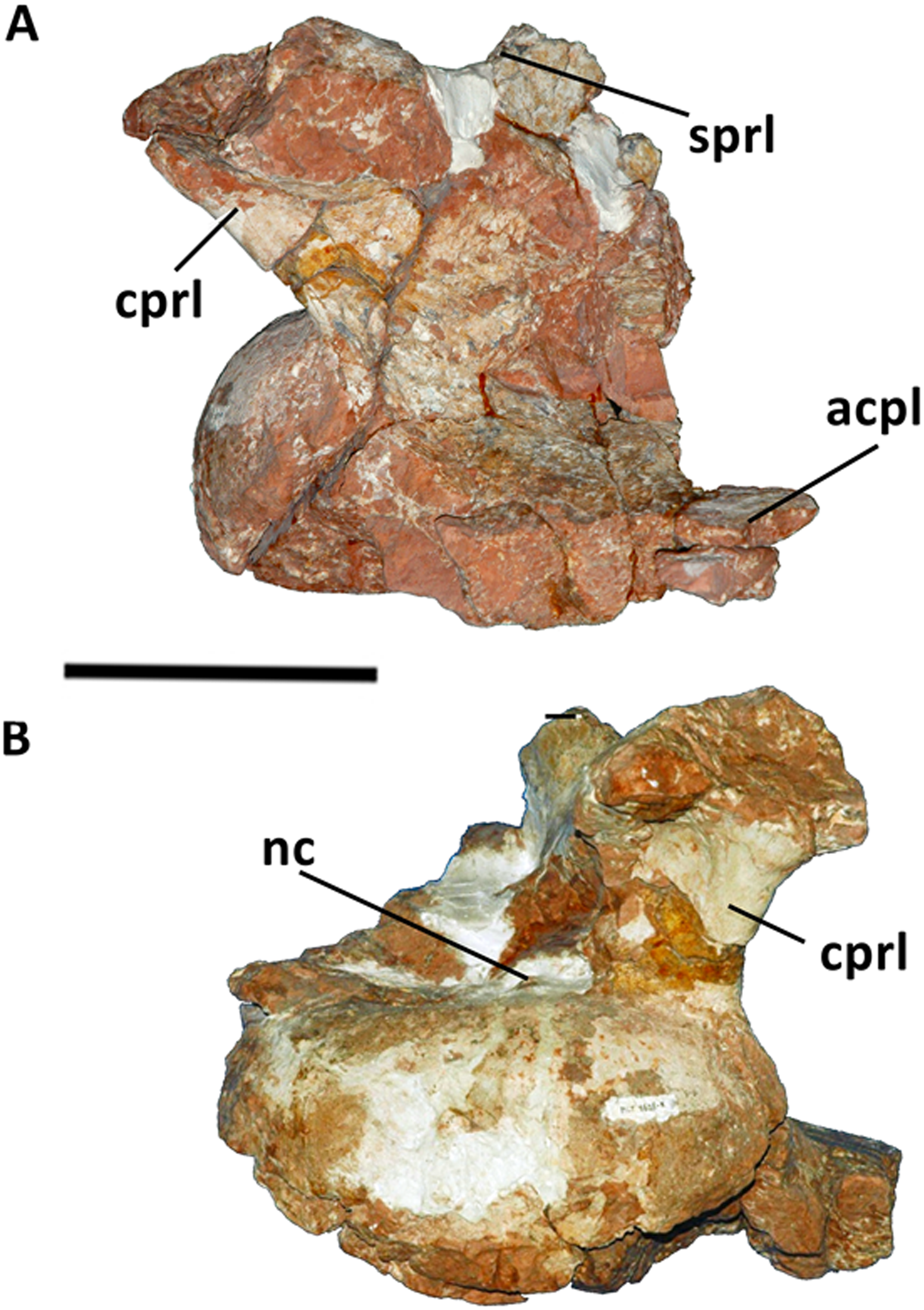
- Twelfth neck vertebra

Scientific classification
- Kingdom: Animalia
- Phylum: Chordata
- Class: Reptilia
- Clade: Dinosauria
- Clade: Saurischia
- Clade: †Sauropodomorpha
- Clade: †Sauropoda
- Clade: †Macronaria
- Clade: †Titanosauria
- Clade: †Lithostrotia
- Genus: †Austroposeidon; Bandeira et al., 2016
- Species: †A. magnificus

Binomial name
- †Austroposeidon magnificus Bandeira et al., 2016

= Austroposeidon =

Austroposeidon Temporal range: Campanian-Maastrichtian, ~72 Ma

Extinct genus of dinosaurs

Austroposeidon is a genus of titanosaurian sauropod dinosaur from the Late Cretaceous Presidente Prudente Formation of Brazil. It contains one species, Austroposeidon magnificus (meaning "Magnificent Southern Poseidon").

== Discovery and naming ==
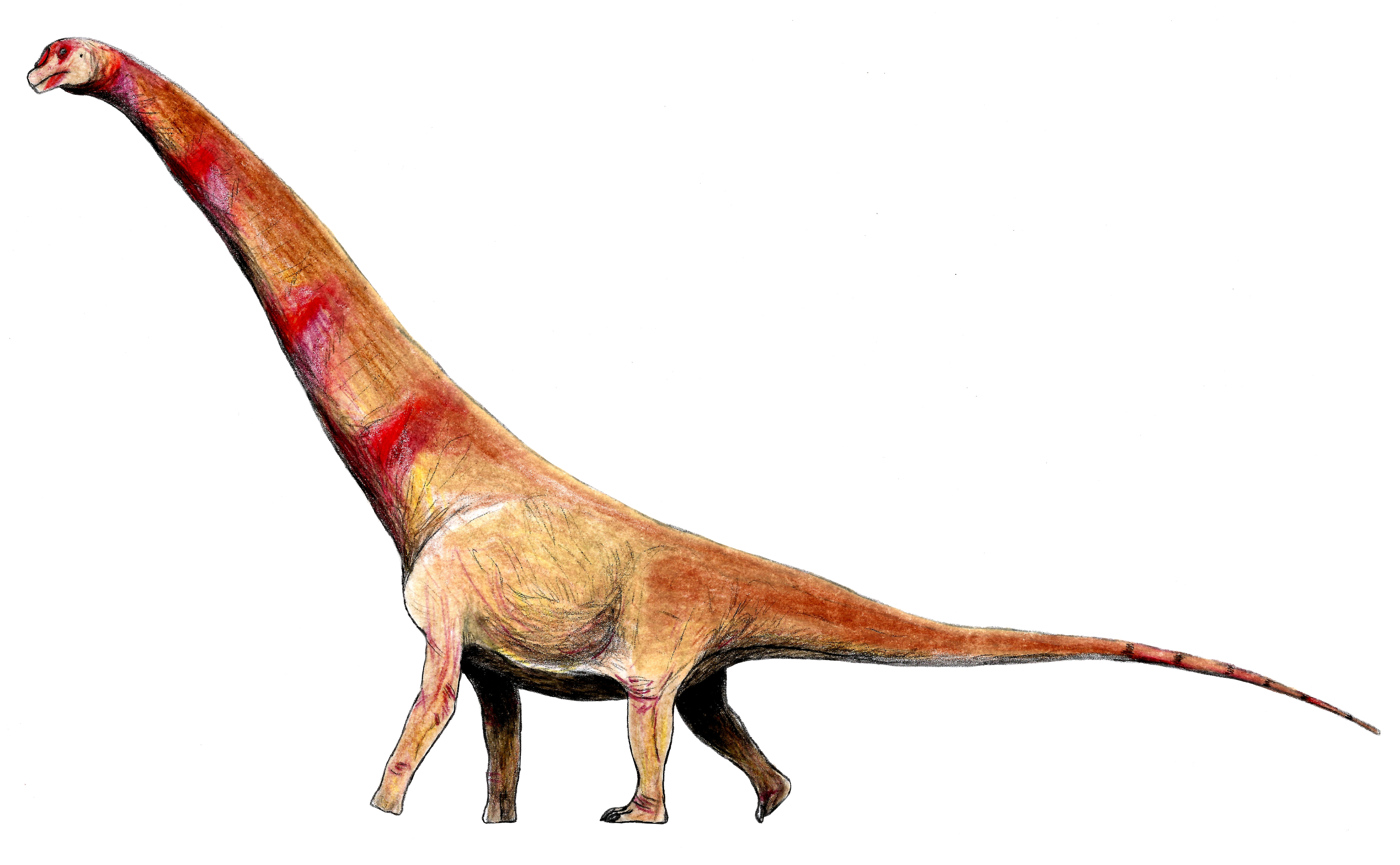
Speculative life restoration

Austroposeidon is known from a single specimen, MCT 1628-R, which consists of portions of the cervical (neck), dorsal (back), and sacral (hip) vertebrae (including a cervical rib and one complete dorsal vertebra). The specimen was discovered in the Campanian-Maastrichtian Presidente Prudente Formation of the Bauru Group by palaeontologist Llewellyn Ivor Price in an outcrop along the Raposo Tavares Road in 1953, but the remains were not described until 2016. The animal was likely preserved by a crevasse splay on a floodplain, judging by the fine sandstone that the specimen was found in. Unfortunately, the site where the specimen was recovered has now been lost to urban development after Felipe Medeiros Simbras was unable to locate the site.

The genus name combines austro ("southern", as in South America, from Latin Auster, the southern wind) and poseidon, a reference to the Greek god of earthquakes of the same name. The specific name is the Latin word magnificus ("great, elevated, noble"), referring to the large size of the specimen.

== Description ==
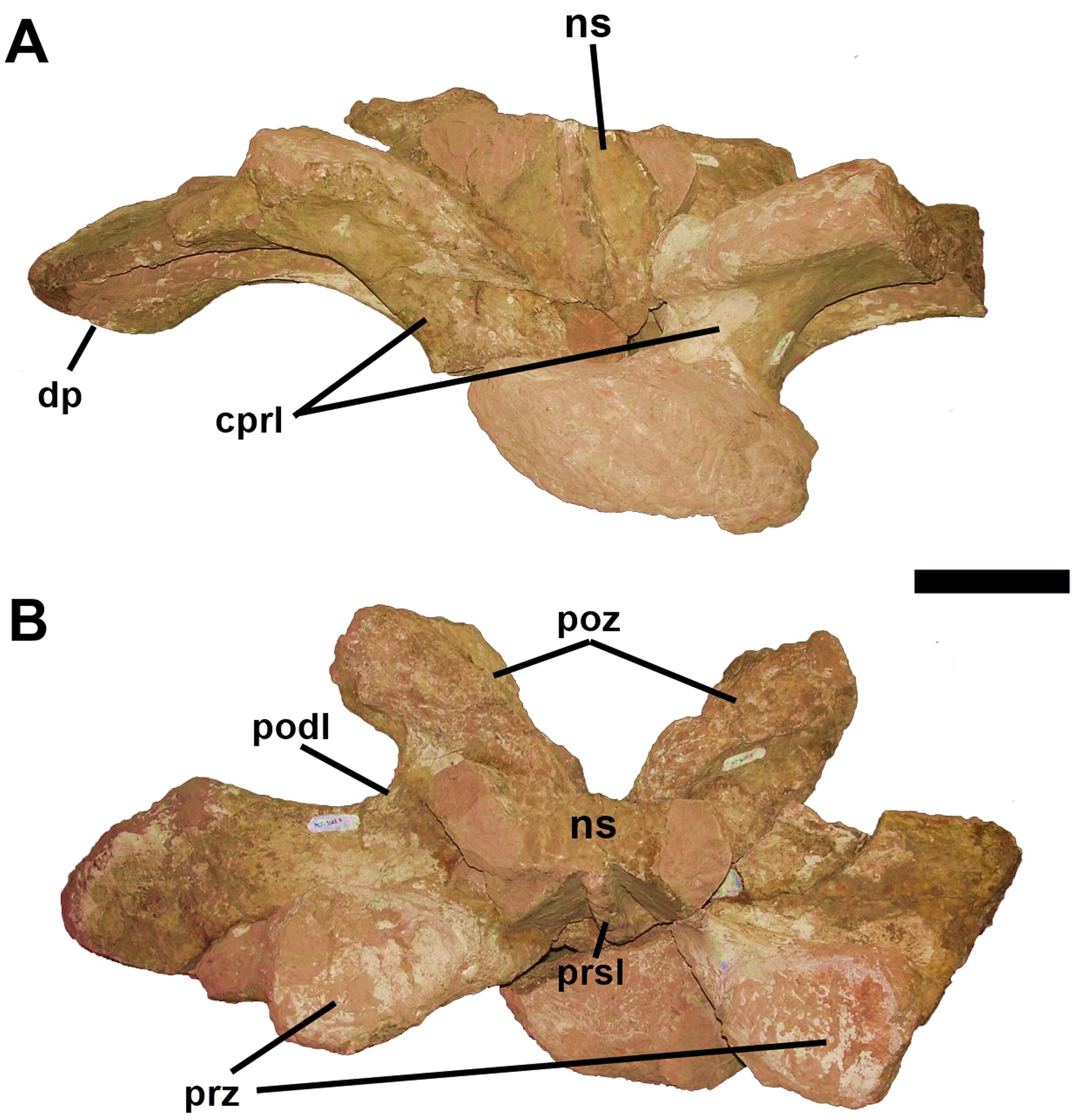
First dorsal vertebra

Austroposeidon was a large sauropod, the largest dinosaur discovered in Brazil, with the only known specimen, an adult, having a length of about 25 metres (82 ft). It is therefore one of the largest dinosaurs from Brazil, alongside Uberabatitan.

Several traits show that Austroposeidon was a titanosaur; the hyposphene-hypantrum articulations are missing from the vertebrae, the cervical and dorsal vertebrae do not have forked neural spines, and the internal texture of the bone is camellate (punctuated by many small air chambers). The describers determined that Austroposeidon was a new genus based on a number of autapomorphies (traits unique to the known fossils) in the vertebrae: the thirteenth cervical vertebra has columnar centropostzygapophyseal laminae, and its rear centrodiapophyseal lamina splits into two prongs; the first dorsal vertebra has front and back centrodiapophyseal laminae that curve downwards and outwards, and its diapophysis stretches down to the top margin of the centrum; and the frontmost part of the spinoprezygapophyseal laminae forks in the dorsal vertebrae positioned towards the back of the torso. Additionally, Austroposeidon possesses a unique combination of other vertebral traits, not seen elsewhere among titanosaurs.

A CT scan showed that the internal bone texture of the vertebrae possessed concentric, alternating rings of camellate tissue and dense tissue; the describers interpreted these as rings of growth within the bone.

== Classification ==
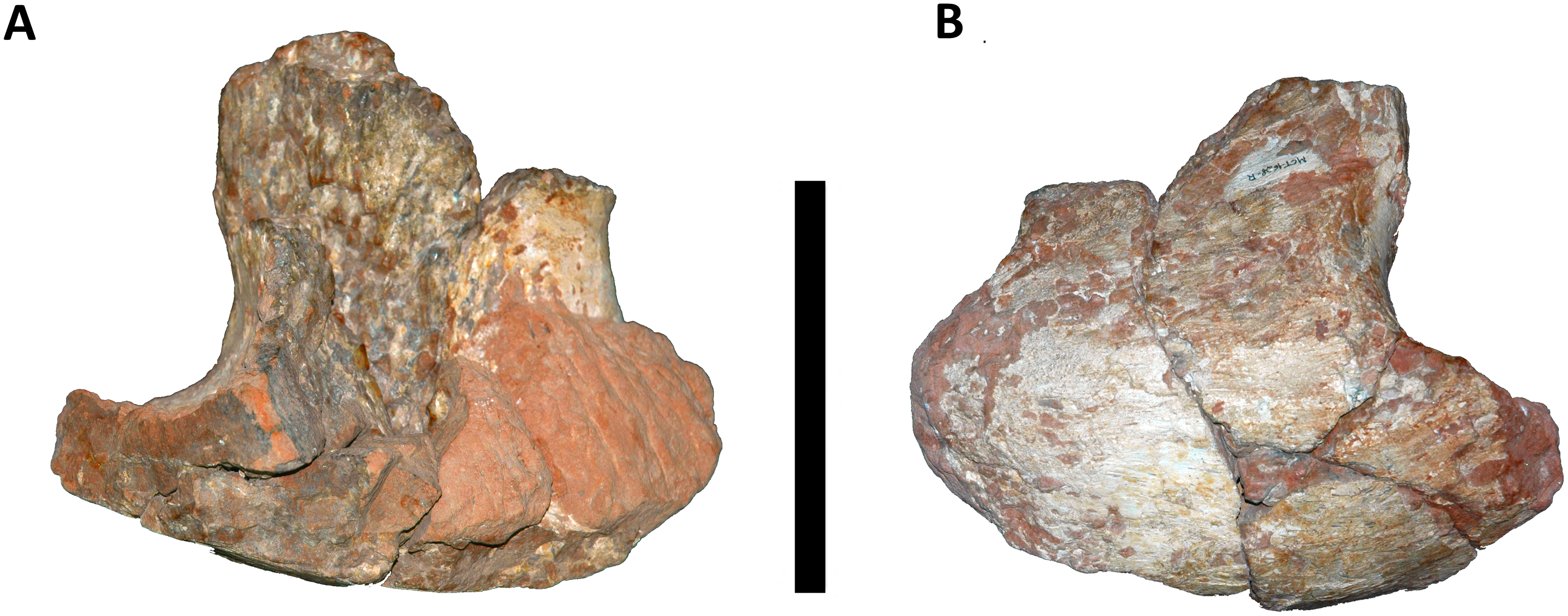
Cervical rib

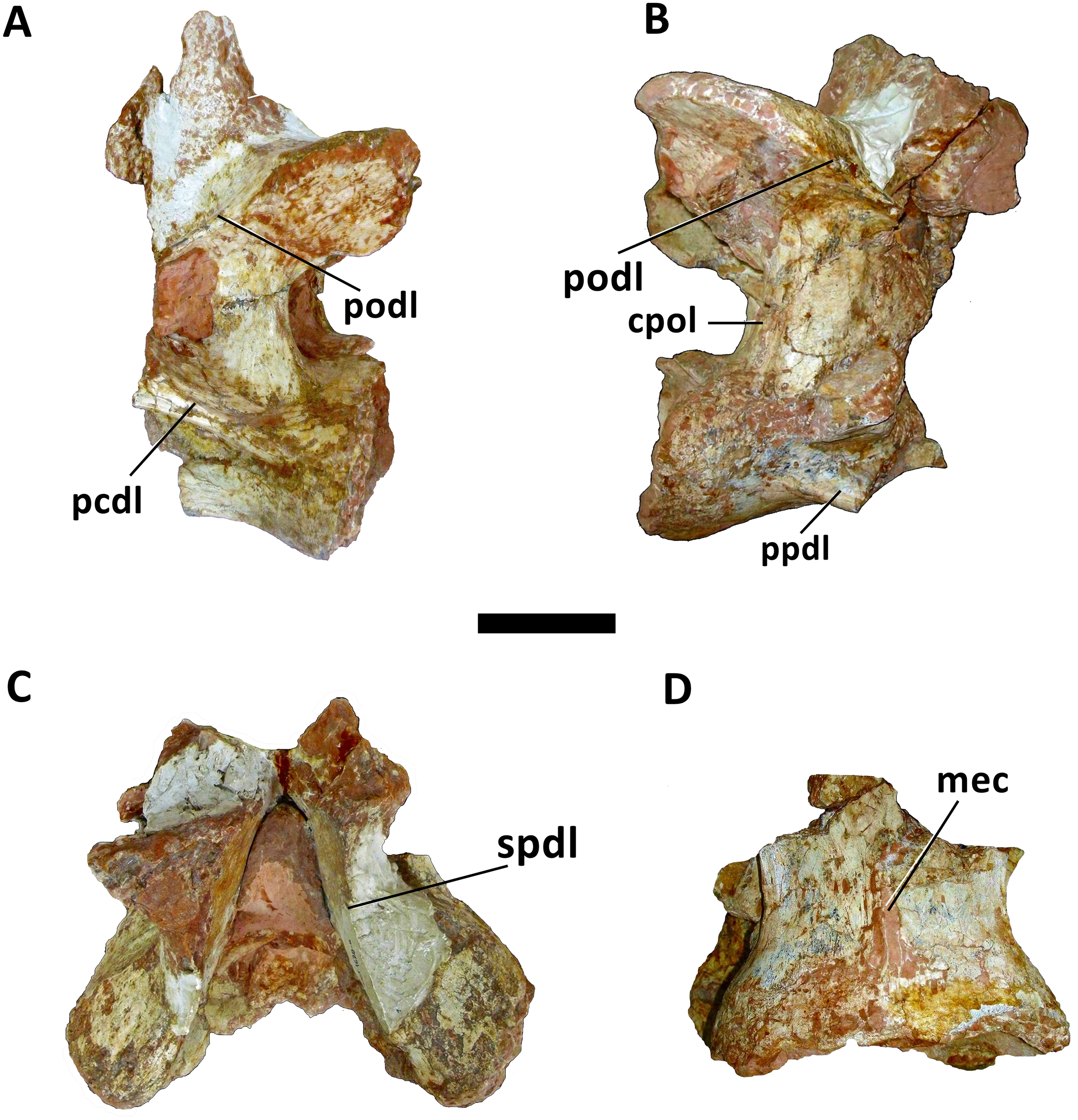
Thirteenth neck vertebra

A phylogenetic analysis in 2016 recovered Austroposeidon as the sister taxon of the Lognkosauria. An updated version was published by Silva et al. (2019), where the only significant changes from the original, based on a redescription of Uberabatitan, was the movement of Uberabatitan and Brasilotitan from Saltasaurinae to Aeolosaurini.

- Titanosauria
  - Andesaurus
  - Lithostrotia
    - - - Rukwatitan
        - Malawisaurus
      - - Puertasaurus
        - - Austroposeidon
          - Lognkosauria
            - Mendozasaurus
            - Futalognkosaurus
    - - Quetecsaurus
      - - Isisaurus
        - - Epachthosaurus
          - - Pellegrinisaurus
            - - - Maxakalisaurus
                - Tapuiasaurus
                - Trigonosaurus
              - - Lirainosaurus
                - - Ampelosaurus
                  - Bonitasaura
                  - Dreadnoughtus
                  - Saltasauridae
                    - - Alamosaurus
                      - Opisthocoelicaudia
                    - Saltasaurinae
                      - Neuquensaurus
                      - - Rocasaurus
                        - Saltasaurus
                  - Aeolosaurini
                    - Rapetosaurus
                    - - Brasilotitan
                      - Uberabatitan
                      - - - Aeolosaurus maximus
                          - Rinconsauria
                            - Muyelensaurus
                            - Rinconsaurus
                        - - Overosaurus
                          - - Gondwanatitan
                            - Aeolosaurus colhuehuapensis
                            - Aeolosaurus rionegrinus

In 2022, Austroposeidon was recovered as a member of Lognkosauria by Navarro et al.:

- Lognkosauria
  - BIBE 45854 (cf. Alamosaurus)
  - Futalognkosaurus
  - - Austroposeidon
    - Mendozasaurus

== See also ==
- 2016 in paleontology
