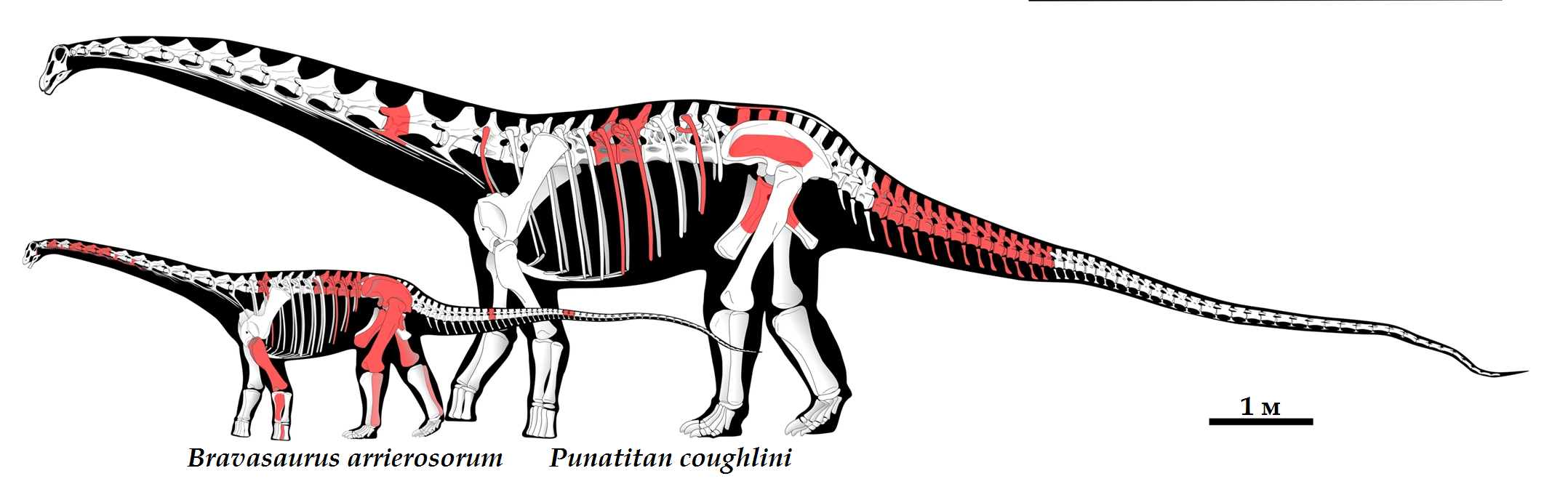
- Punatitan (right) compared with a Bravasaurus (left)

Scientific classification
- Kingdom: Animalia
- Phylum: Chordata
- Class: Reptilia
- Clade: Dinosauria
- Clade: Saurischia
- Clade: †Sauropodomorpha
- Clade: †Sauropoda
- Clade: †Macronaria
- Clade: †Titanosauria
- Clade: †Lithostrotia
- Clade: †Aeolosaurini
- Genus: †Punatitan; Hechenleitner et al., 2020

Type species
- †Punatitan coughlini Hechenleitner et al., 2020

= Punatitan =

Punatitan Temporal range: Late Cretaceous, Campanian–Maastrichtian

Extinct genus of dinosaurs

Punatitan (meaning "puna giant") is a genus of titanosaurian sauropod dinosaur from the Late Cretaceous Ciénaga del Río Huaco Formation of La Rioja, Argentina. It contains one species, Punatitan coughlini.

== Etymology ==
The generic name Punatitan refers to the oxygen-depleted atmosphere characteristic of the Andes. The specific name refers to geologist Tim Coughlin, who first reported dinosaur fossils in the discovery locality.

== Description ==
Known from the holotype CRILAR-Pv 614 (Paleovertebrate Collection of Centro Regional de Investigaciones Científicas y Transferencia Tecnológica de La Rioja, Argentina), a partial skeleton composed of the anterior portion of posterior cervical vertebra (likely C12), two middle dorsal vertebrae (likely D6–D7), a partial sacrum, 13 articulated caudal vertebrae (some with articulated haemal arches), the right pubis, the left ischium, and several dorsal ribs, Punatitan was roughly 14 metres (46 ft) long.

== Classification ==
The describers' phylogenetic analysis places Punatitan as a derived member of the Lithostrotia, in the clade Aeolosaurini, which they recover as a subclade of Rinconsauria, opposite to other analyses. Notably, Punatitan was recovered within a clade consisting of two species of the genus Aeolosaurus, but the describers refrained from assigning it to said genus, instead regarding the more basal species' ("A." maximus) placement in Aeolosaurus dubious. However, with the reassignment of "Aeolosaurus" maximus to the genus Arrudatitan in 2021, Punatitan's generic separation could be justified.

Their cladogram is shown below:

- Lithostrotia
  - Malawisaurus
  - - Epachthosaurus
    - - Eutitanosauria
        - Dreadnoughtus
        - - - - Rapetosaurus
              - - Isisaurus
                - Tapuiasaurus
            - Saltasauridae
          - Colossosauria
            - Baurutitan
            - - - Bonitasaura
                - - Notocolossus
                  - Lognkosauria
              - Rinconsauria
                - Rinconsaurus
                - - Muyelensaurus
                  - Aeolosaurini
                    - - Overosaurus
                      - - Arrudatitan
                        - - Punatitan
                          - Aeolosaurus
                    - - Bravasaurus
                      - Trigonosaurus
                      - Gondwanatitan
                      - Uberabatitan

== Paleoenvironment ==
The holotype locality, the Quebrada de Santo Domingo site, preserves one of the largest concentrations of titanosaur eggs in the world. The describing authors suggest some connection with either Punatitan or its contemporary Bravasaurus, which was described in the same paper.
