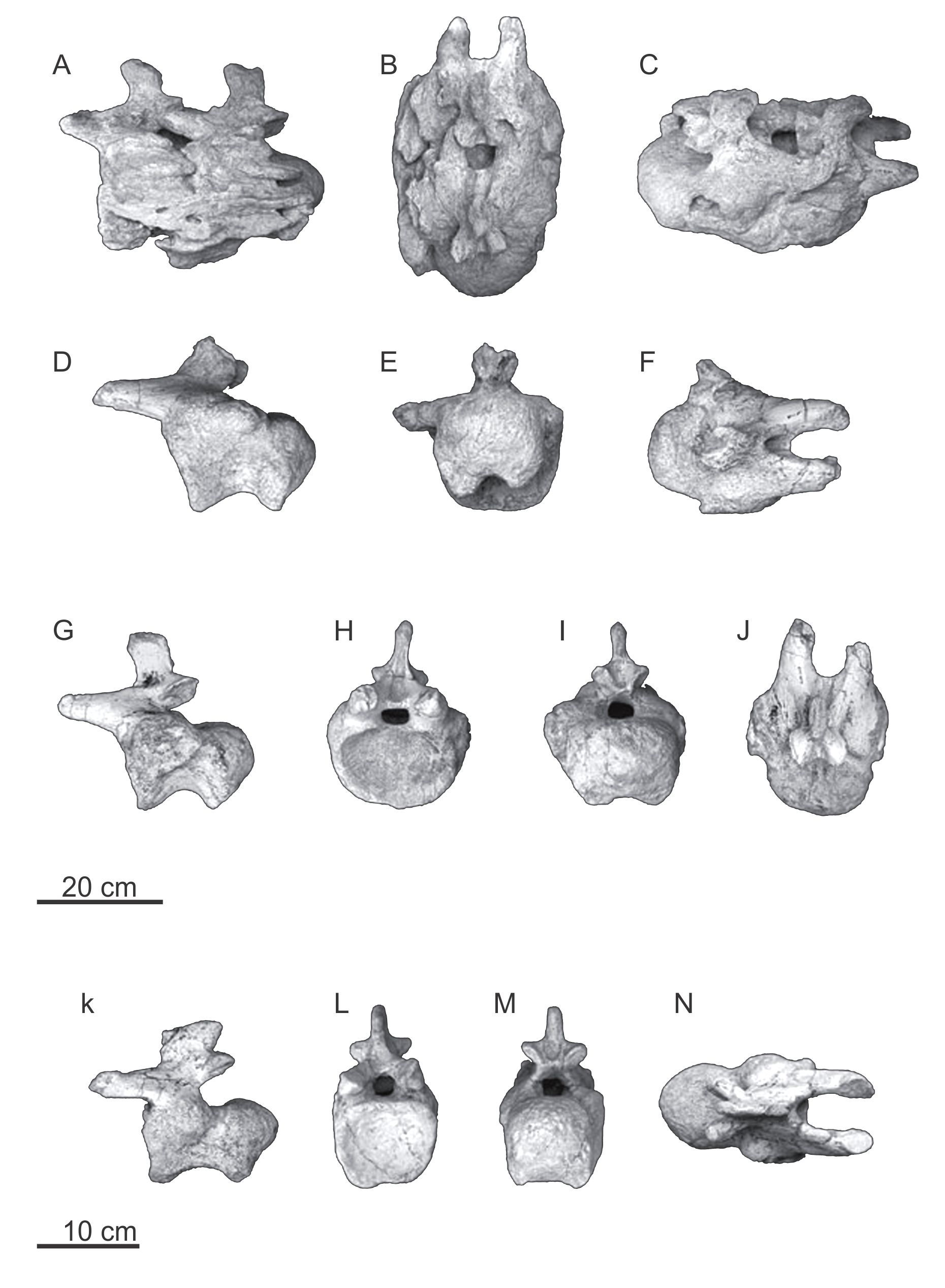
- Holotype caudal vertebrae of Uberabatitan

Scientific classification
- Kingdom: Animalia
- Phylum: Chordata
- Class: Reptilia
- Clade: Dinosauria
- Clade: Saurischia
- Clade: †Sauropodomorpha
- Clade: †Sauropoda
- Clade: †Eusauropoda
- Clade: †Macronaria
- Clade: †Titanosauria
- Clade: †Lithostrotia
- Genus: †Uberabatitan; Salgado and Carvalho, 2008

Type species
- †Uberabatitan ribeiroi Salgado and Carvalho, 2008

= Uberabatitan =

Uberabatitan Temporal range: Late Cretaceous, 67 Ma

Extinct genus of dinosaurs

Uberabatitan (meaning "Uberaba titan", in reference to where it was found) is a genus of titanosaurian sauropod dinosaur from the Late Cretaceous of Brazil. It is known from bones including neck, back, and tail vertebrae, pelvic bones, and limb bones. These fossils were found in the uppermost portion of the Maastrichtian-age Serra da Galga Formation of the Bauru Group, in Uberaba, Minas Gerais. The type species, described by Salgado and Carvalho in 2008, is U. ribeiroi. To date, it is the most recent titanosaur from Bauru Group rocks; other titanosaurs from the Bauru Group, including Baurutitan and Trigonosaurus, come from lower (thus older) levels.

== Discovery and naming ==
Uberabatitan ribeiroi was named by Leonardo Salgado and Ismar de Souza Carvalho in 2008, based on specimens found at a road cut along Federal Highway BR-050 in Uberaba, Minas Gerais. The genus name refers to Uberaba and the species name honors Luiz Carlos Borges Ribeiro, the director of the Centro de Pesquisas Paleontológicas Lewellyn Price, for his support.

=== Fossil record ===
Fossils of Uberabatitan ribeiroi have been found in the Serra da Galga Formation (Note: Uberabatitan ribeiroi was previously reported as being known from the Serra da Galga Member of the Marília Formation, but these strata are now recognized as distinct from the Marília Formation.) in Minas Gerais, Brazil. All the specimens attributed to U. ribeiroi were found in a single quarry, and have been accessioned at the Centro de Pesquisas Paleontológicas Llewellyn Ivor Price (CPPLIP) at the Federal University of Triângulo Mineiro. More than sixty bones have been found, representing the intermingled remains of at least five individuals of various sizes and ages, with both immature and mature individuals represented. These remains include cervical, dorsal, sacral, and caudal vertebrae, chevrons, and portions of the shoulders, hips, and limbs. As is commonly the case in titanosaurs, the skull is not known. The holotype consists of the tibia (CPPLIP-912), fibula (CPPLIP-1107), and astragalus (CPPLIP-1082) of a single individual; other elements had initially been included in the holotype as well, but were excluded due to the lack of evidence that they came from the same individual. Another specimen from the Serra da Galga Formation, MCT 1487-R, also known as "DGM Series A", exhibits close similarities to Uberabatitan and may belong to it, or at least a close relative. MCT 1487-R consists of a nearly complete neck, one of the few known for any titanosaur. Two teeth found at the Uberabatitan site, and others found elsewhere in the Serra da Galga Formation, may also belong to Uberabatitan ribeiroi; one of these teeth, CPPLIP-1166, is the largest titanosaur tooth ever found, with a crown 6.2 centimetres (2.4 in) high from its base to its apex.

== Description ==
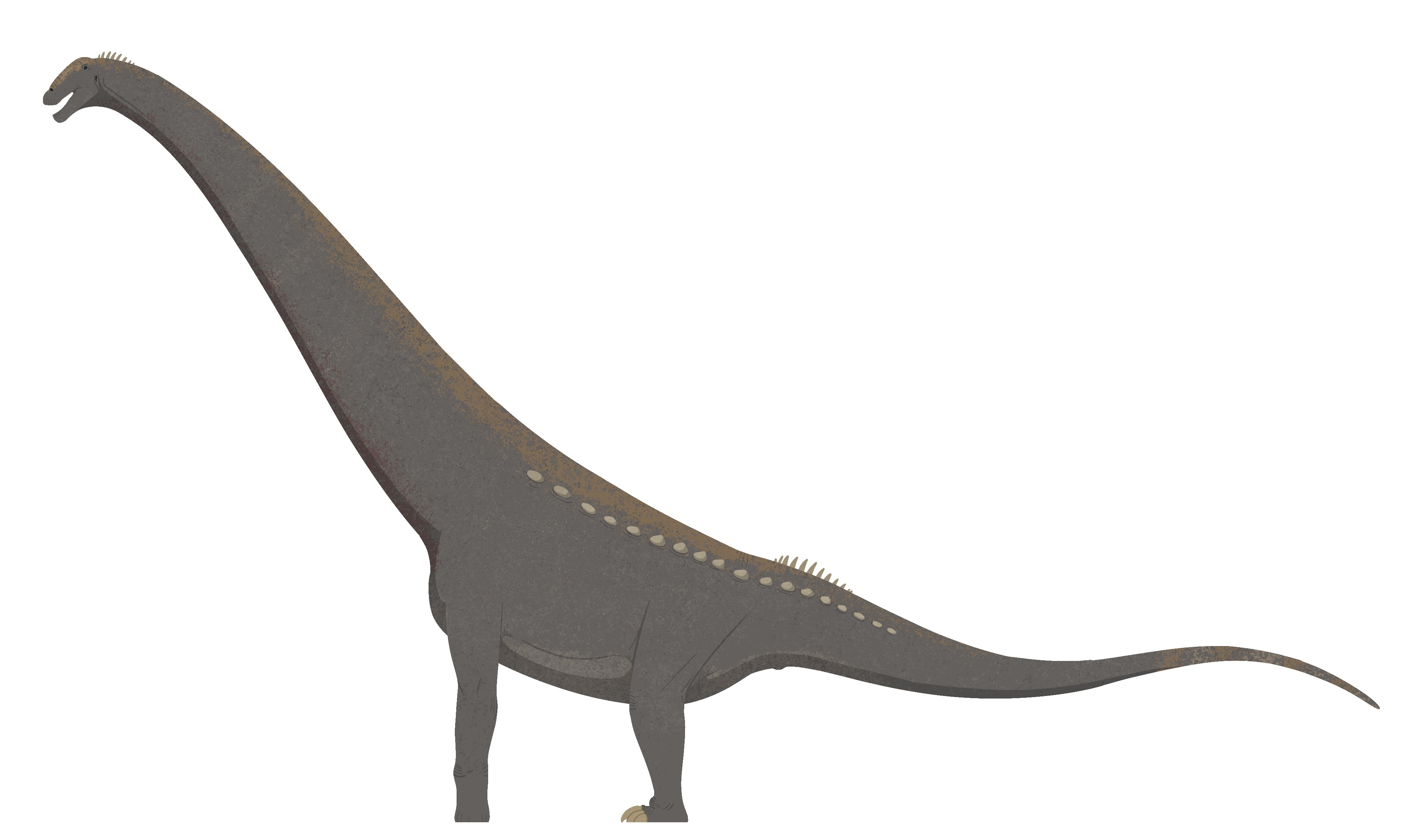
Speculative life restoration

As a sauropod, Uberabatitan would have been a large, quadrupedal herbivore with a long neck. It has been estimated that Uberabatitan ribeiroi could reach a length of 26 metres (85 ft), although most known specimens are of much smaller individuals.

Although the skull of Uberabatitan is unknown, it may belong to a clade of titanosaurs that were characterized by a broad, squared-off snout. The teeth possibly referable to Uberabatitan are slender and chisel-like, as in other titanosaurs.

As in many other sauropods, Uberabatitan had hyper-elongate cervical ribs, much of the length of which was formed by ossified tendons.

The tibia and fibula of Uberabatitan exhibit some taxonomically significant traits. The tibia has a robust lateral protuberance that articulates with a medial knob on the fibula, which is an autapomorphy of Uberabatitan ribeiroi. As in Laplatasaurus, but unlike most titanosaurs, there is a concave surface behind the lateral tuberosity of the fibula.

== Classification ==
Phylogenetic position of Uberabatitan in an analysis by Silva and colleagues in 2019:

- Titanosauria
  - Andesaurus
  - Lithostrotia
    - - - Rukwatitan
        - Malawisaurus
      - - Puertasaurus
        - - Austroposeidon
          - Lognkosauria
            - Mendozasaurus
            - Futalognkosaurus
    - - Quetecsaurus
      - - Isisaurus
        - - Epachthosaurus
          - - Pellegrinisaurus
            - - - Maxakalisaurus
                - Tapuiasaurus
                - Trigonosaurus
              - - Lirainosaurus
                - - Ampelosaurus
                  - Bonitasaura
                  - Dreadnoughtus
                  - Saltasauridae
                    - - Alamosaurus
                      - Opisthocoelicaudia
                    - Saltasaurinae
                      - Neuquensaurus
                      - - Rocasaurus
                        - Saltasaurus
                  - Aeolosaurini
                    - Rapetosaurus
                    - - Brasilotitan
                      - Uberabatitan
                      - - - Aeolosaurus maximus
                          - Rinconsauria
                            - Muyelensaurus
                            - Rinconsaurus
                        - - Overosaurus
                          - - Gondwanatitan
                            - Aeolosaurus colhuehuapensis
                            - Aeolosaurus rionegrinus

Possible close relatives of Uberabatitan include Laplatasaurus and Brasilotitan. Gallina and Otero recovered Laplatasaurus as the sister taxon of Uberabatitan in an analysis that did not include Brasilotitan. Navarro and colleagues and Filippi and colleagues have recovered Brasilotitan as the sister taxon of Uberabatitan in analyses that did not include Laplatasaurus. Silva and colleagues regarded a close relationship between Uberabatitan and Brasilotitan "possible"; their analysis recovered a polytomy of Brasilotitan, Uberabatitan, and a clade containing other members of Aeolosaurini. In an analysis that included neither Laplatasaurus nor Brasilotitan, Uberabatitan was recovered as a member of Aeolosaurini most closely related to Bravasaurus, Gondwanatitan, and Trigonosaurus.

== Paleobiology ==
Uberabatitan, like other sauropods, underwent rapid, uninterrupted growth early in life. Individuals closer to maturity would have transitioned to cyclical growth, with periodic slowdowns in their growth rate.
