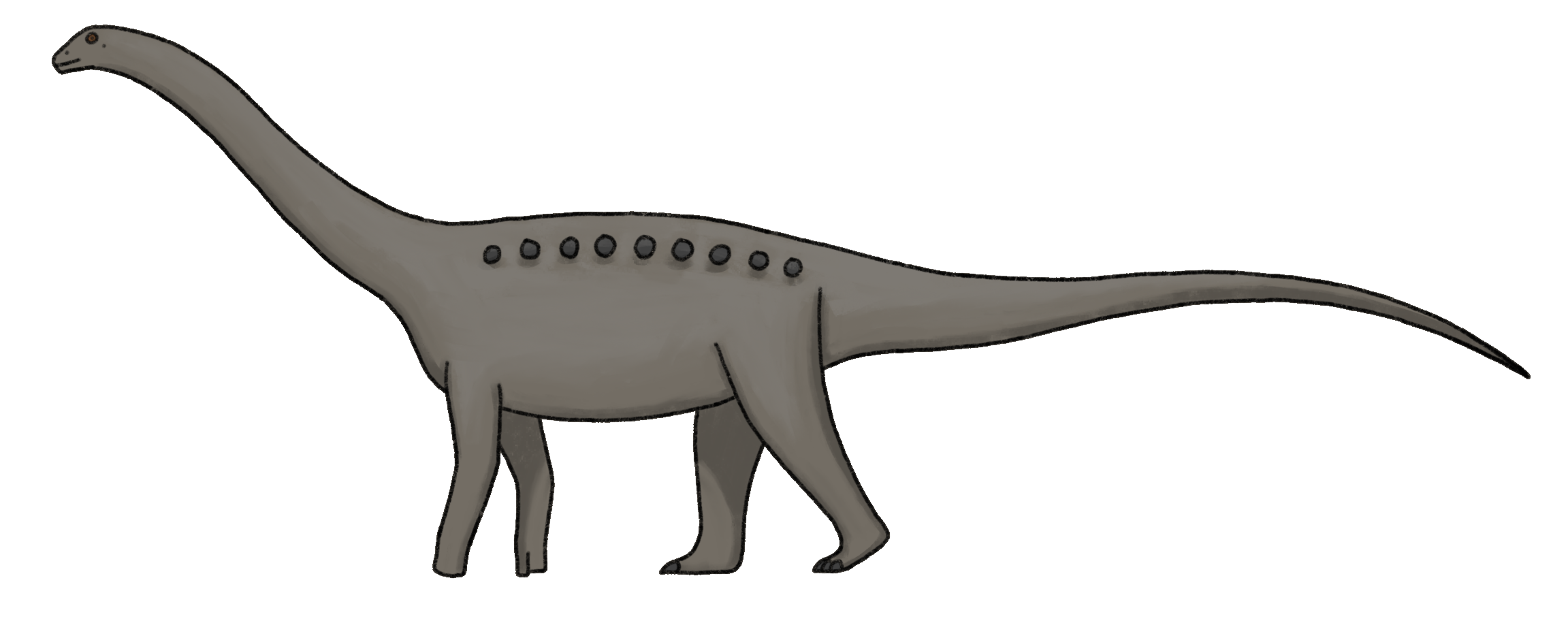
- Speculative restoration of Bravasaurus

Scientific classification
- Kingdom: Animalia
- Phylum: Chordata
- Class: Reptilia
- Clade: Dinosauria
- Clade: Saurischia
- Clade: †Sauropodomorpha
- Clade: †Sauropoda
- Clade: †Macronaria
- Clade: †Titanosauria
- Clade: †Lithostrotia
- Clade: †Aeolosaurini
- Genus: †Bravasaurus; Hechenleitner et al., 2020

Type species
- †Bravasaurus arreirosorum Hechenleitner et al., 2020

= Bravasaurus =

Bravasaurus Temporal range: Late Cretaceous, Campanian–Maastrichtian

Extinct genus of dinosaurs

Bravasaurus (meaning Laguna Brava lizard) is a genus of titanosaurian sauropod dinosaur from the Late Cretaceous Ciénaga del Río Huaco Formation of La Rioja, Argentina. It contains one species, Bravasaurus arreirosorum.

== Etymology ==
The generic name Bravasaurus is derived from the Laguna Brava National Park in Argentina. The specific name refers to the people, the arriero or drivers in Spanish, who carried cattle through the Andes in the 19th century.

== Description ==
Bravasaurus was roughly 7 metres (23 ft) long and weighed nearly 2.9 metric tons (3.2 short tons). It is known from the holotype CRILAR-Pv 612, which consists of the right quadrate and quadratojugal, four cervical, five dorsal, and three caudal vertebrae, few dorsal ribs, three haemal arches, the left humerus, a fragmentary ulna, the metacarpal IV, a partial left ilium with sacral ribs, the right pubis, a partial ischium, the left femur, and both fibulae, and the paratype CRILAR-Pv 613, which consists of an isolated tooth, the right ilium, the right femur, and dorsal ribs.

== Classification ==
The describers' phylogenetic analysis places Bravasaurus as a derived member of the Lithostrotia, in the clade Aeolosaurini, which they recover as a subclade of Rinconsauria, different from other cladograms. Their cladogram is shown below.

- Lithostrotia
  - Malawisaurus
  - - Epachthosaurus
    - - Eutitanosauria
        - Dreadnoughtus
        - - - - Rapetosaurus
              - - Isisaurus
                - Tapuiasaurus
            - Saltasauridae
          - Colossosauria
            - Baurutitan
            - - - Bonitasaura
                - - Notocolossus
                  - Lognkosauria
              - Rinconsauria
                - Rinconsaurus
                - - Muyelensaurus
                  - Aeolosaurini
                    - - Overosaurus
                      - - "Aeolosaurus"
                        - - Punatitan
                          - Aeolosaurus
                    - - Bravasaurus
                      - Trigonosaurus
                      - Gondwanatitan
                      - Uberabatitan

== Paleoenvironment ==
The holotype locality, the Quebrada de Santo Domingo site, preserves one of the largest concentrations of titanosaur eggs in the world. The describing authors suggest some connection with either Bravasaurus or its contemporary Punatitan, which was described in the same paper.
