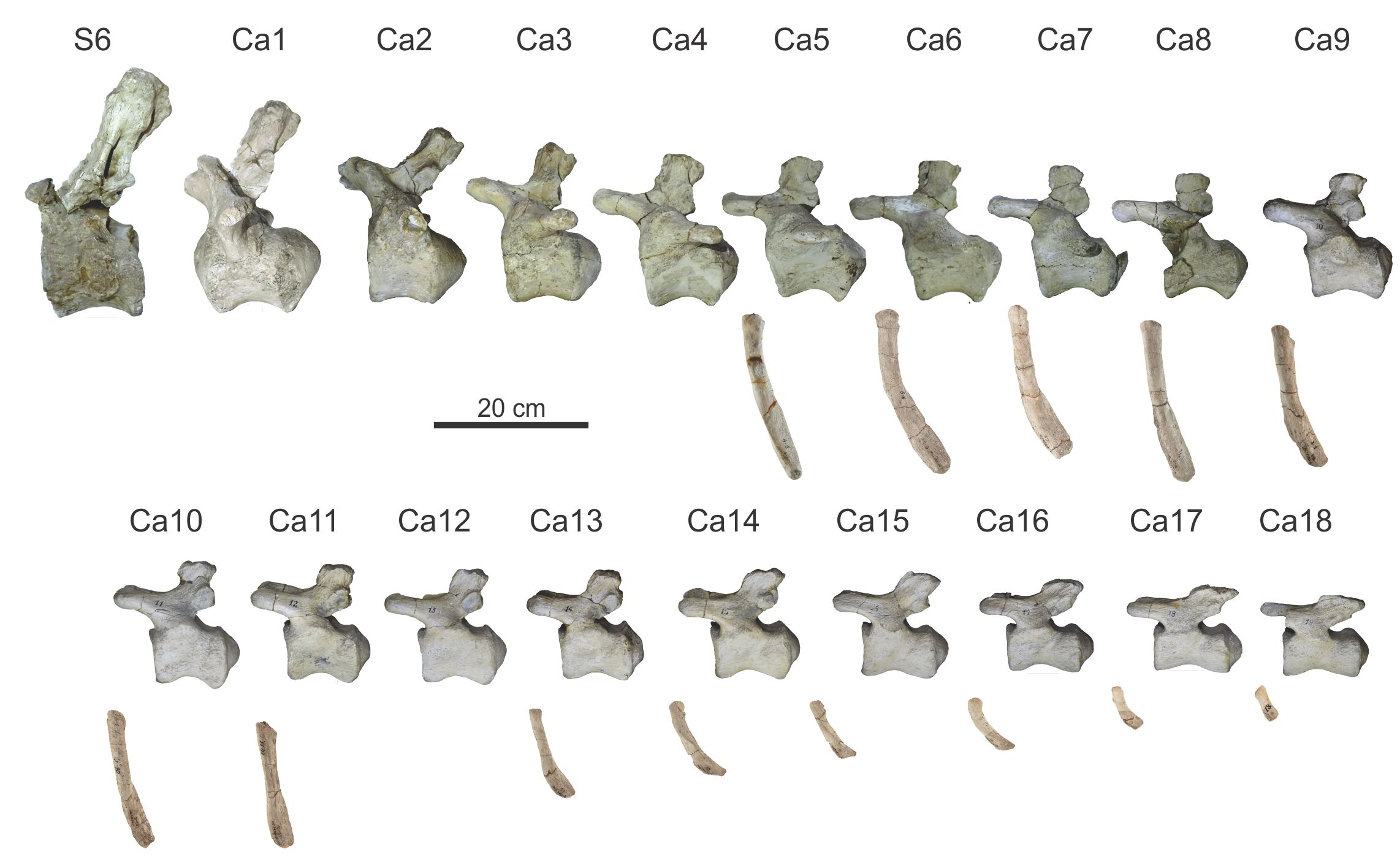
- Holotype of Baurutitan

Scientific classification
- Kingdom: Animalia
- Phylum: Chordata
- Class: Reptilia
- Clade: Dinosauria
- Clade: Saurischia
- Clade: †Sauropodomorpha
- Clade: †Sauropoda
- Clade: †Macronaria
- Clade: †Titanosauria
- Clade: †Lithostrotia
- Genus: †Baurutitan; Kellner et al. 2005

Type species
- Baurutitan britoi Kellner et al. 2005

Synonyms
- Trigonosaurus pricei? Campos et al., 2005

= Baurutitan =

Baurutitan Temporal range: Maastrichtian ~70–66 Ma

Extinct genus of dinosaurs

Baurutitan is a genus of sauropod dinosaur that lived during the Late Cretaceous in what is now Brazil. The type species, Baurutitan britoi, was described in 2005 by Kellner and colleagues, although the fossil remains had already been discovered in 1957. Baurutitan is classified as a lithostrotian titanosaur, and is distinguished from related genera based on its distinctive caudal vertebrae. This South American dinosaur was found in the Serra da Galga Formation near Uberaba, in the Brazilian state of Minas Gerais.

== Discovery ==
The holotype of Baurutitan were found in 1957 by Llewellyn Ivor Price, the famous Brazilian paleontologist, in the region of Peirópolis, Minas Gerais. However, it was not until 2005 that Baurutitan was officially published and named. The works of Price in Peirópolis began in 1947 after Jesuíno Felicíssimo Junior, from the Instituto Geográfico e Geológico of São Paulo, told him about the presence of fossils in the region. Price then conducted excavations in an old quarry, known as Quarry Caieira, on the in São Luis farm. Recovered fossils included those of turtles, crocodylomorphs, theropods and sauropods, fish, freshwater invertebrates (gastropods and bivalves), trace fossils, fragments of eggs, and plant debris. Dynamite was occasionally used to remove materials embedded in the matrix. There were expeditions to Caieira between 1949 and 1961, after which fieldwork was not continued due to a lack of new relevant findings.

A series of 19 vertebrae (the last sacral and 18 caudals) found at this locality were recognized as belong to those of a titanosaur; they were initially named 'Series "C"', and subsequently became the holotype of the new genus Baurutitan (specimen number MCT 1490-R). All material found was stored in the collection of Museu de Ciência da Terra (Earth Science Museum – MCT) of the Departamento Nacional de Produção Mineral (National Department of Mineral Production) in Rio de Janeiro.

In addition to Caieira Quarry, Price also worked in the "Point 6" or "Rodovia" site, also from the Serra da Galga Formation, about 1.5 km east of Peirópolis. Field work during the 1980s and 1990s discovered many titanosaur remains, including vertebrae and limb bones. A preliminary report found the cervical and dorsal vertebrae from the site similar to Trigonosaurus, while the caudal vertebrae were similar to Baurutitan. In 2022, the remains were described, and were found to share characteristics with both Baurutitan and Trigonosaurus. This led the describing authors to synonymize the two taxa, while separating the unique paratype of Trigonosaurus as the new genus Caieiria. However, not all researchers have accepted the conclusion that Trigonosaurus is a synonym of Baurutitan; John Fronimos, in 2023, did not follow the proposed synonymy due to the differencess between the first caudal vertebrae of the two taxa.

=== Etymology ===
The name Baurutitan comes from the junction of the word "bauru", which alludes to the geographical region of the finding, within the Bauru Group, and the word "titan" of Greek myths. The specific name "britoi" is given in honor of Ignácio Aureliano Machado Brito, a Brazilian paleontologist who advised the study and description of this dinosaur, whose fossils have remained stored for many years.

== Description ==
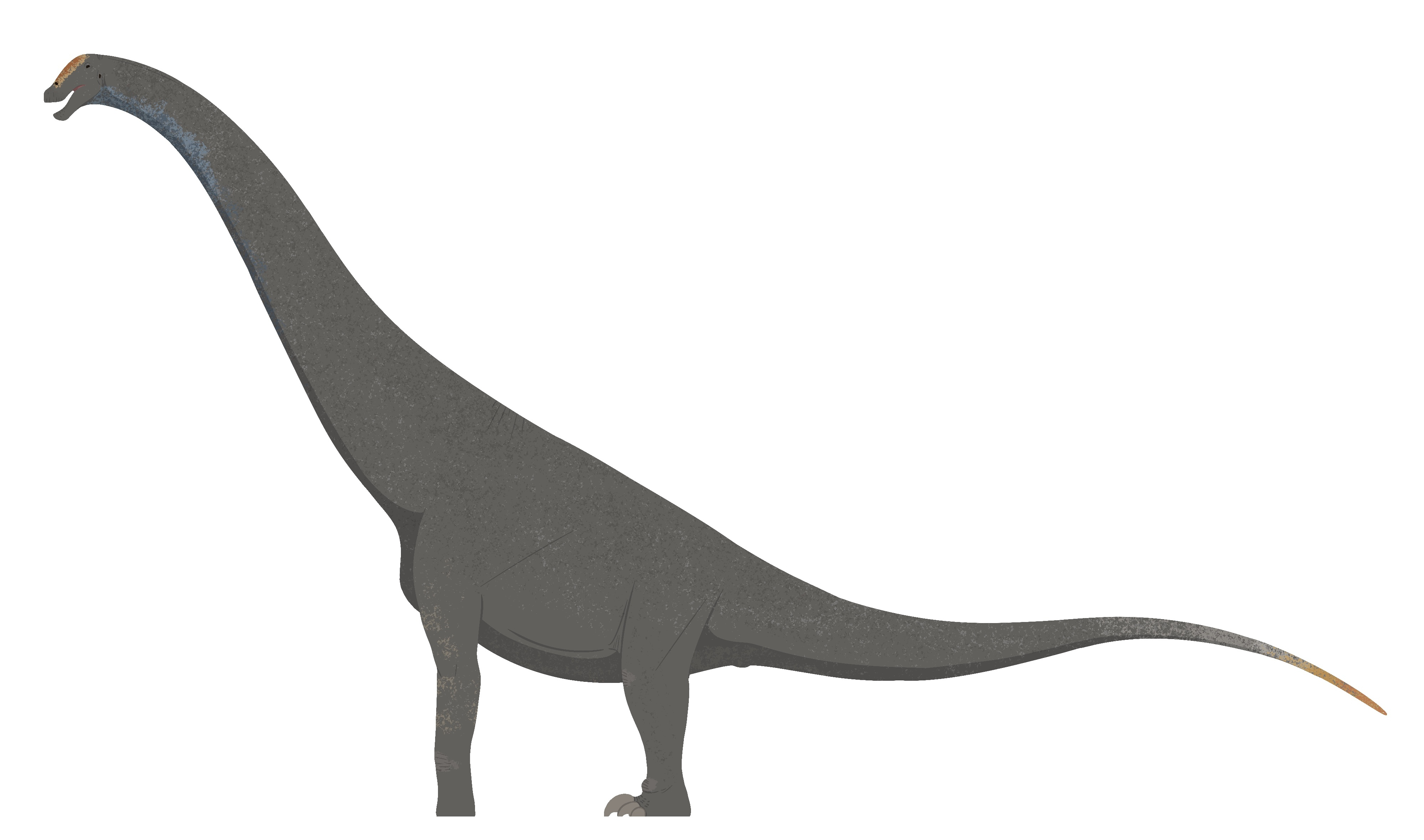
Speculative life restoration

Baurutitan was a sauropod which was estimated to have measured 12–14 metres (39–46 ft) long and had a height of around 3.5 metres (11 ft). The holotype specimen was found in the Serra da Galga Formation, dating to the Maastrichtian epoch, some 72-66 million years ago. Baurutitan was the fourth sauropod described in Brazil, after Antarctosaurus, Gondwanatitan and Amazonsaurus.

== Classification ==
In their 2017 description of Patagotitan, José Carballido and colleagues placed Baurutitan as a member of Lithostrotia in their phylogenetic analyses.

In the 2023 description of titanosaur remains from the Serra da Galga Formation including the new taxon Caieiria, Silva Junior et al. performed a phylogenetic analysis of titanosaurs including Baurutitan (which incorporated information from Trigonosaurus). It was found to be in a clade within Aeolosaurini, which is recovered within Rinconsauria. Their cladogram is shown below:

- Rinconsauria
  - Rinconsaurus
  - - Uberabatitan
    - Aeolosaurini
      - - Baurutitan
        - Gondwanatitan
        - - Bravasaurus
          - Caieiria
      - - Muyelensaurus
        - - Overosaurus
          - - Arrudatitan
            - - Aeolosaurus spp.
              - Punatitan
