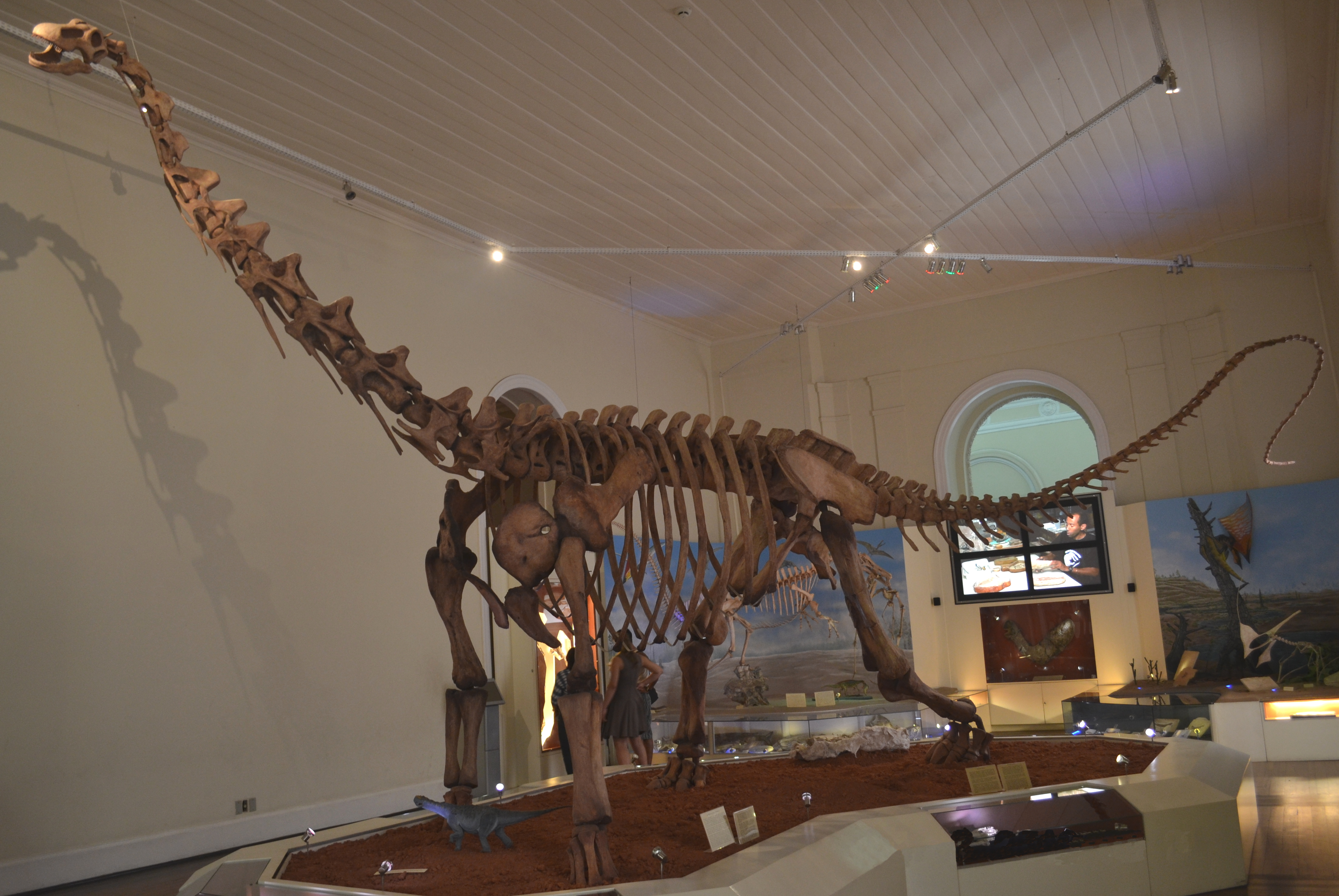
- Reconstructed skeleton

Scientific classification
- Kingdom: Animalia
- Phylum: Chordata
- Class: Reptilia
- Clade: Dinosauria
- Clade: Saurischia
- Clade: †Sauropodomorpha
- Clade: †Sauropoda
- Clade: †Macronaria
- Clade: †Titanosauria
- Clade: †Lithostrotia
- Genus: †Maxakalisaurus; Kellner et al., 2006
- Species: †M. topai

Binomial name
- †Maxakalisaurus topai Kellner et al., 2006

= Maxakalisaurus =

Maxakalisaurus Temporal range: Late Cretaceous 72–68 Ma

Extinct genus of dinosaurs

Maxakalisaurus is a genus of titanosaur dinosaur, found in the Adamantina Formation of Brazil, in the state of Minas Gerais in 1998. The genus name is derived from the tribe of the Maxakali; Topa is one of their divinities.

== Discovery and naming ==
Over the course of four field seasons, from 1998 to 2002, the National Museum of Brazil excavated a partial skeleton of a titanosaur along the Campina Verde - Prata road, 45 km to the west of Prata, Minas Gerais. In 2006, a team led by Alexander W. A. Kellner described the remains as a new genus and species of sauropod, Maxakalisaurus topai. The genus name honors the Maxakali, an ethnic group indigenous to the region, and the species name refers to the Maxakali deity Topa.

=== Fossil record ===
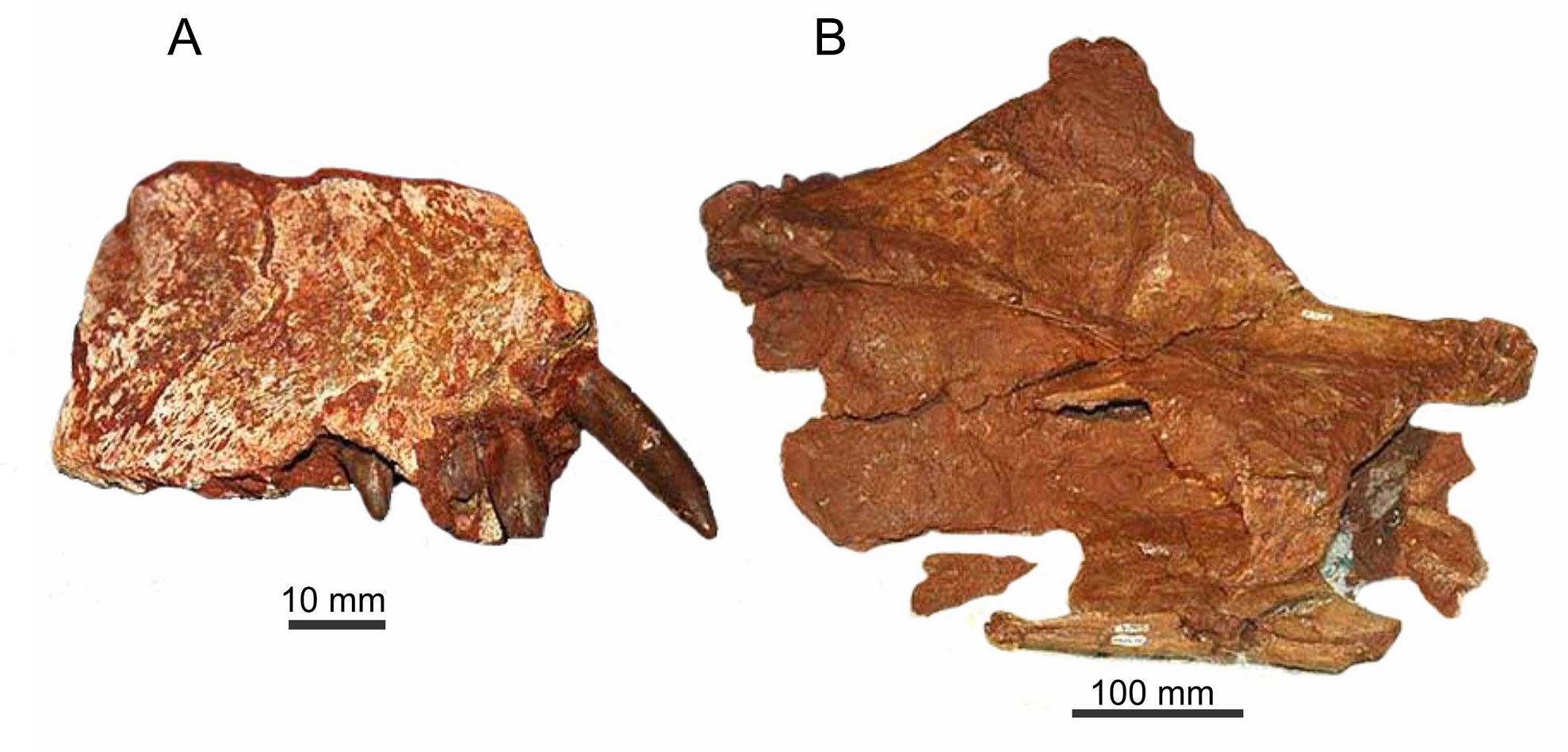
Holotype maxilla (left) and cervical vertebra (right)

Fossils of Maxakalisaurus topai are known from the Adamantina Formation. The holotype, MN 5013-V, was housed at the National Museum of Brazil. It included a fragmentary right maxilla with teeth, twelve cervical vertebrae and some cervical ribs, seven dorsal vertebrae and some dorsal ribs, a neural spine and centrum from the sacrum, six caudal vertebrae, some haemal arches, pieces of the scapulae, both sternal plates, part of the left ischium, both humeri, two metacarpals, part of the fibula, an osteoderm, and some unidentified pieces. Two other sternal plates and part of a third scapula were also found at the site, and are considered to belong to a second individual. Some of the elements from the type locality pertained to an adult individual and others pertained to a subadult individual. A partial dentary and some teeth were subsequently recovered from the type locality and are also considered to belong to M. topai. Some elements of the holotype were lost in the National Museum of Brazil fire on 2 September 2018, but several elements survived the fire and were recovered.

== Description ==
Maxakalisaurus is considered a medium-sized titanosaur. The type specimen of Maxakalisaurus belonged to an animal about 12.1 meters (40 feet) long, with an estimated weight of 5 tonnes (5.5 short tons). It had a long neck and tail, ridged teeth (unusual among sauropods) and lived about 80 million years ago. Because sauropods seem to have lacked significant competition in South America, they evolved there with greater diversity and more unusual traits than elsewhere in the world. Like many other titanosaurs, Maxakalisaurus had osteoderms.

== Classification ==
França et al.'s 2016 description of the second specimen also included a phylogenetic analysis, which placed Maxakalisaurus as a basal member of the Aeolosaurini. Their cladogram is shown below:

- Lithostrotia
  - Malawisaurus
  - - Muyelensaurus
    - - Nemegtosauridae
        - Nemegtosaurus
        - - Tapuiasaurus
          - Rapetosaurus
      - Saltasauroidea
        - Diamantinasaurus
        - Baurutitan
        - Isisaurus
        - Saltasauridae
          - - Alamosaurus
            - Opisthocoelicaudia
          - - Neuquensaurus
            - Saltasaurus
        - Aeolosaurini
          - Maxakalisaurus
          - Panamericansaurus
          - Rinconsaurus
          - - Gondwanatitan
            - - Aeolosaurus maximus (Arrudatitan)
              - - Aeolosaurus colhuehuapensis
                - Aeolosaurus rionegrinus
