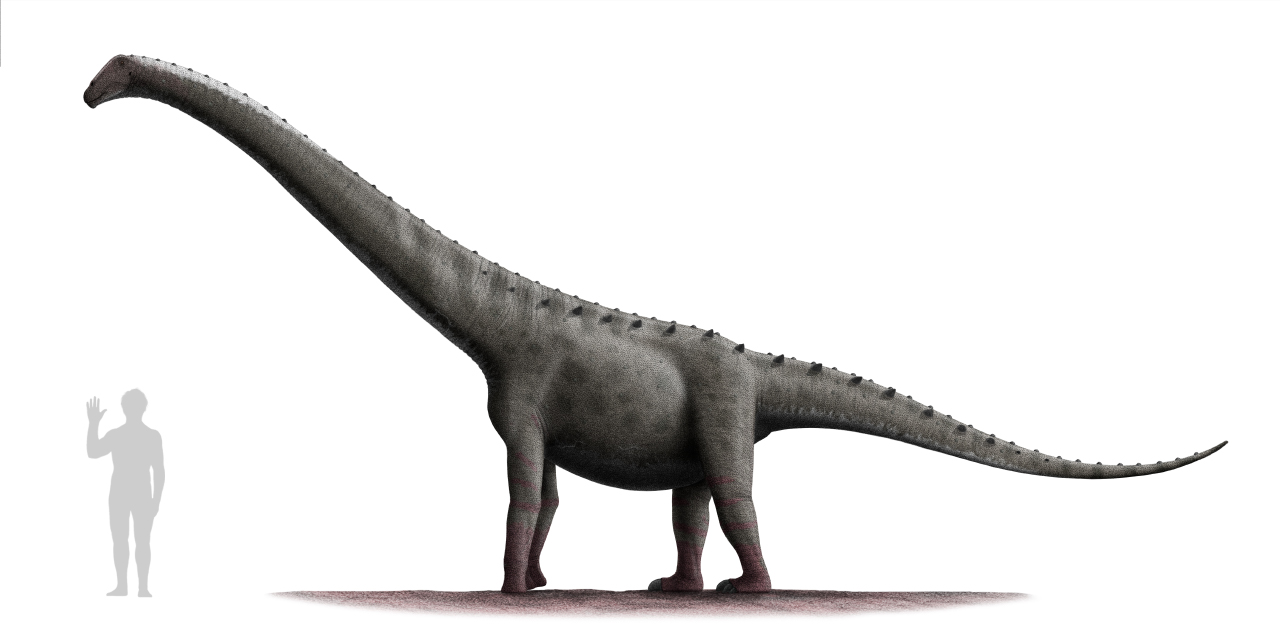
- Life reconstruction of Rinconsaurus caudamirus

Scientific classification
- Kingdom: Animalia
- Phylum: Chordata
- Class: Reptilia
- Clade: Dinosauria
- Clade: Saurischia
- Clade: †Sauropodomorpha
- Clade: †Sauropoda
- Clade: †Macronaria
- Clade: †Titanosauria
- Clade: †Eutitanosauria
- Clade: †Colossosauria
- Clade: †Rinconsauria; Calvo et al., 2007

Genera
- †Muyelensaurus
- †Rinconsaurus
Potentially included genera
- †Adamantisaurus
- †Aeolosaurus
- †Argyrosaurus
- †Arrudatitan
- †Baurutitan
- †Bonitasaura
- †Brasilotitan
- †Bravasaurus
- †Chadititan
- †Gondwanatitan
- †Maxakalisaurus
- †Narambuenatitan
- †Ninjatitan
- †Normanniasaurus
- †Overosaurus
- †Panamericansaurus
- †Pitekunsaurus
- †Punatitan
- †Rukwatitan
- †Shingopana
- †Trigonosaurus
- †Uberabatitan

= Rinconsauria =

Rinconsauria Temporal range: Late Cretaceous, 89–84 Ma

Extinct clade of titanosaurian sauropods

Rinconsauria is an extinct clade of titanosaurian sauropods known from the late Cretaceous period of Argentina. All members of this clade are fairly small compared to the largest titanosaurs, at less than around 11 metres (36 ft) long. The membership of Rinconsauria is highly unstable; some phylogenetic analyses find the clade to be restricted to the two genera that define the clade, Rinconsaurus and Muyelensaurus, but over twenty other titanosaur genera have been included in the clade by various analyses.

== Systematics ==
Rinconsauria was coined by Calvo et al. (2007) to include their new titanosaur Muyelensaurus and the previously described Rinconsaurus. Santucci and Arruda-Campos (2011) recovered Rinconsauria as part of Aeolosaurini, as did Franca et al. (2016) and Silva et al. (2019). However, cladistic analyses by Gonzalez-Riga et al. (2019) and Mannion et al. (2019) found Aeolosaurus to be in a phylogenetically disparate position than Rinconsauria, with Rinconsauria as sister to Lognkosauria in the clade Colossosauria.

The membership of Rinconsauria has varied considerably between different phylogenetic analyses. As originally proposed by Calvo and colleagues, the clade included only two genera, Rinconsaurus and Muyelensaurus, which were defined to be members of the clade. Not all phylogenetic analyses have recovered Muyelensaurus and Rinconsaurus as closely related among titanosaurs. In 2011, Santucci and Campos recovered Rinconsaurus as closely related to Aeolosaurus while Muyelensaurus was recovered as a more basal titanosaur, outside the clade uniting Aeolosaurini and Saltasauridae. One analysis by Mannion and colleagues in 2019 recovered Rinconsaurus as a non-lithostrotian titanosaur and Muyelensaurus as a lithostrotian closely related to Antarctosaurus and Mendozasaurus. A phylogenetic analysis by Gallina and Otero in 2015 found Muyelensaurus to be more closely related to a clade consisting of Futalognkosaurus, Mendozasaurus, Bonitasaura, Laplatasaurus, and Uberabatitan than to Rinconsaurus.

Rinconsauria may be closely related to Aeolosaurini, and in fact several analyses have found Aeolosaurini to fall within Rinconsauria, while others have found the two clades to be separate.

=== List of potentially included genera ===
- Adamantisaurus: Recovered as a member of Rinconsauria by Navarro and colleagues in 2022, but previously considered a member of Titanosauria incertae sedis
- Aeolosaurus: Recovered as a member of Rinconsauria by Navarro and colleagues in 2022, and Gorscak and colleagues in 2023, but outside Rinconsauria in several analyses
- Argyrosaurus: Recovered as a member of Rinconsauria by Gorscak and colleagues in 2023.
- Arrudatitan: Recovered as a member of Rinconsauria by Navarro and colleagues in 2022, but outside Rinconsauria by Díez Díaz and colleagues in 2025.
- Baurutitan was recovered as a member of Rinconsauria in one analysis by Díez Díaz and colleagues in 2025, but outside Rinconsauria by Gorscak and colleagues in 2023, and in another analysis by Díez Díaz and colleagues in 2025.
- Bonitasaura: Recovered as a member of Rinconsauria by Gorscak and colleagues in 2023, while several analyses have found it to be outside Rinconsauria.
- Brasilotitan: recovered as member of Rinconsauria by Navarro and colleagues in 2022, but outside Rinconsauria by Filippi and colleagues in 2023.
- Bravasaurus: Recovered as a member of Rinconsauria by Navarro and colleagues in 2022.
- Chadititan: Recovered as a member of Rinconsauria in its original description by Agnolín and colleagues in 2025.
- Gondwanatitan: Recovered as a member of Rinconsauria by Navarro and colleagues in 2022, Gorscak and colleagues in 2023, but outside Rinconsauria by Calvo and colleagues in 2007 and Agnolín and colleagues in 2025.
- Maxakalisaurus: Recovered as a member of Rinconsauria by Navarro and colleagues in 2022, but outside Rinconsauria by Gorscak and colleagues in 2023.
- Narambuenatitan: Recovered as a member of Rinconsauria by Pérez Moreno and colleagues in 2022, but outside Rinconsauria by Filippi and colleagues in 2023.
- Ninjatitan: Recovered as a member of Rinconsauria by Pérez Moreno and colleagues in 2022, but outside Rinconsauria by Filippi and colleagues in 2023.
- Normanniasaurus was recovered as a member of Rinconsauria in one analysis by Díez Díaz and colleagues in 2025, and outside Rinconsauria, albeit closely related to it, in another analysis by Díez Díaz and colleagues in 2025, and by Gorscak and colleagues in 2023.
- Overosaurus: Recovered as a member of Rinconsauria by Gorscak and colleagues in 2023, and Agnolín and colleagues in 2025, but outside Rinconsauria by Filippi in colleagues in 2023 and Mocho and colleagues in 2024.
- Panamericansaurus: Recovered as a member of Rinconsauria by Gorscak and colleagues in 2023.
- Pitekunsaurus: Recovered as a member of Rinconsauria by Pérez Moreno and colleagues in 2022 and Agnolín and colleagues in 2025, but outside Rinconsauria in several analyses.
- Punatitan: Recovered as a member of Rinconsauria by Hechenleitner and colleagues in 2020, and Navarro and colleagues in 2022, but outside Rinconsauria by Agnolín and colleagues in 2025.
- Rukwatitan: Recovered as a member of Rinconsauria by Díez Díaz and colleagues in 2025, but outside Rinconsauria by Gorscak and colleagues in 2023.
- Shingopana: Recovered as a member of Rinconsauria by Gorscak and colleagues in 2023. but outside Rinconsauria by Díez Díaz and colleagues in 2025.
- Trigonosaurus: Recovered as a member of Rinconsauria by Navarro and colleagues in 2022 and Gorscak and colleagues in 2023, but outside Rinconsauria by Díez Díaz and colleagues in 2025.
- Uberabatitan: Recovered as member of Rinconsauria by Navarro and colleagues in 2022, but outside Rinconsauria by Filippi and colleagues in 2023 and Díez Díaz and colleagues in 2025.
