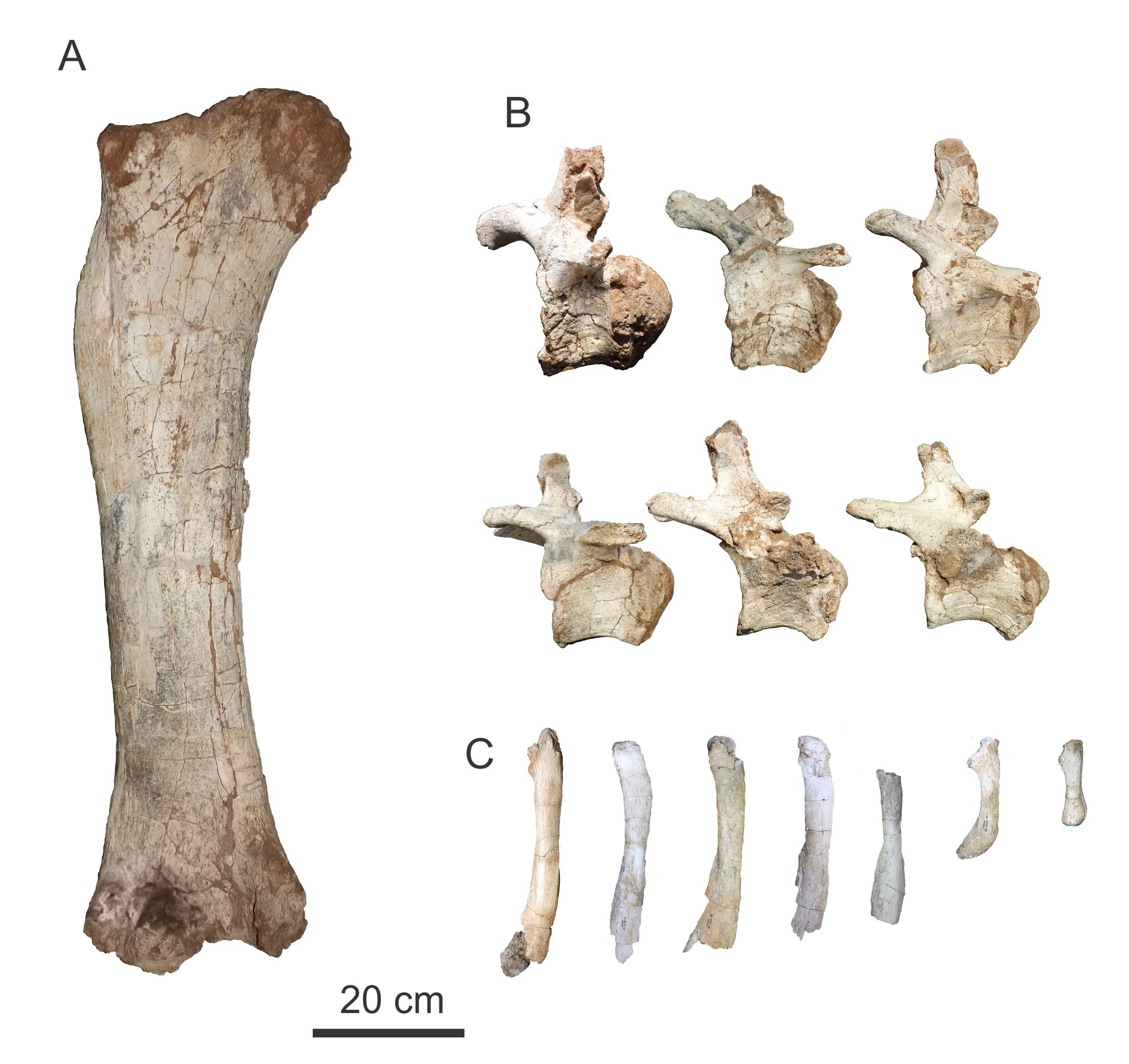
- Select elements of the Arrudatitan holotype

Scientific classification
- Kingdom: Animalia
- Phylum: Chordata
- Class: Reptilia
- Clade: Dinosauria
- Clade: Saurischia
- Clade: †Sauropodomorpha
- Clade: †Sauropoda
- Clade: †Macronaria
- Clade: †Titanosauria
- Clade: †Lithostrotia
- Clade: †Aeolosaurini
- Genus: †Arrudatitan; Silva et al., 2021

Type species
- †Arrudatitan maximus Santucci & De Arruda-Campos, 2011

= Arrudatitan =

Arrudatitan Temporal range: Late Cretaceous, 72.1–68 Ma

Extinct genus of titanosaur

Arrudatitan (meaning "Arruda's giant") is an extinct genus of titanosaur sauropod dinosaur known from the Late Cretaceous (Campanian-Maastrichtian)-aged Adamantina Formation of Brazil. The type species, A. maximus, was named and described in 2011 as a species of Aeolosaurus, but was separated into its own genus in 2021. It was relatively gracile for a titanosaur.

== Discovery and naming ==
The holotype, MPMA 12-0001-97, which includes two partial posterior cervicals, fragments of several dorsals, parts of nine caudals, seven partial cervical ribs, twelve partial dorsal ribs, eight chevrons, a fragmentary scapula and arm bones, the left and partial right femur, the left ischium, and fragments; with other specimens known, such as the isolated middle caudal vertebra MPP 248, was discovered in 1997 by Ademir Frare and his 12-year-old nephew Luiz Augusto dos Santos Frare in a field in Cândido Rodrigues. They notified palaeontologist Antônio Celso de Arruda Campos and the holotype was collected between 1997 and 1998 by staff of the Museu de Paleontologia de Monte Alto and it was first mentioned in scientific literature by Santucci and Bertini (2001). They noted that crocodylomorph and theropod teeth were found near the holotype, but no bite marks were present. In 2009, Fernando Novas briefly noted on the holotype, noting its size.

MPMA 12-0001-97 was initially assigned to Aeolosaurus in 2011, when the species Aeolosaurus maximus was created by Santucci & De Arruda-Campos. As early as Martinelli et al. (2011), published shortly before Aeolosaurus maximus was described, the caudal vertebra of the holotype of Aeolosaurus maximus was seen as an indeterminate aeolosaurin distinct from Aeolosaurus, with Bandeira et al. (2016) referring to the species as "A". maximus throughout their paper describing the titanosaurian sauropod Austroposeidon magnificus due to Aeolosaurus maximus being sufficiently different from Aeolosaurus but had not yet been placed within a different genus; and subsequent analyses, such as Silva et al. (2019) and Hechenleitner et al. (2020), found that Aeolosaurus maximus did not belong in the Aeolosaurus genus and so the new genus Arrudatitan was erected in 2021 by Silva et al.

== Description ==
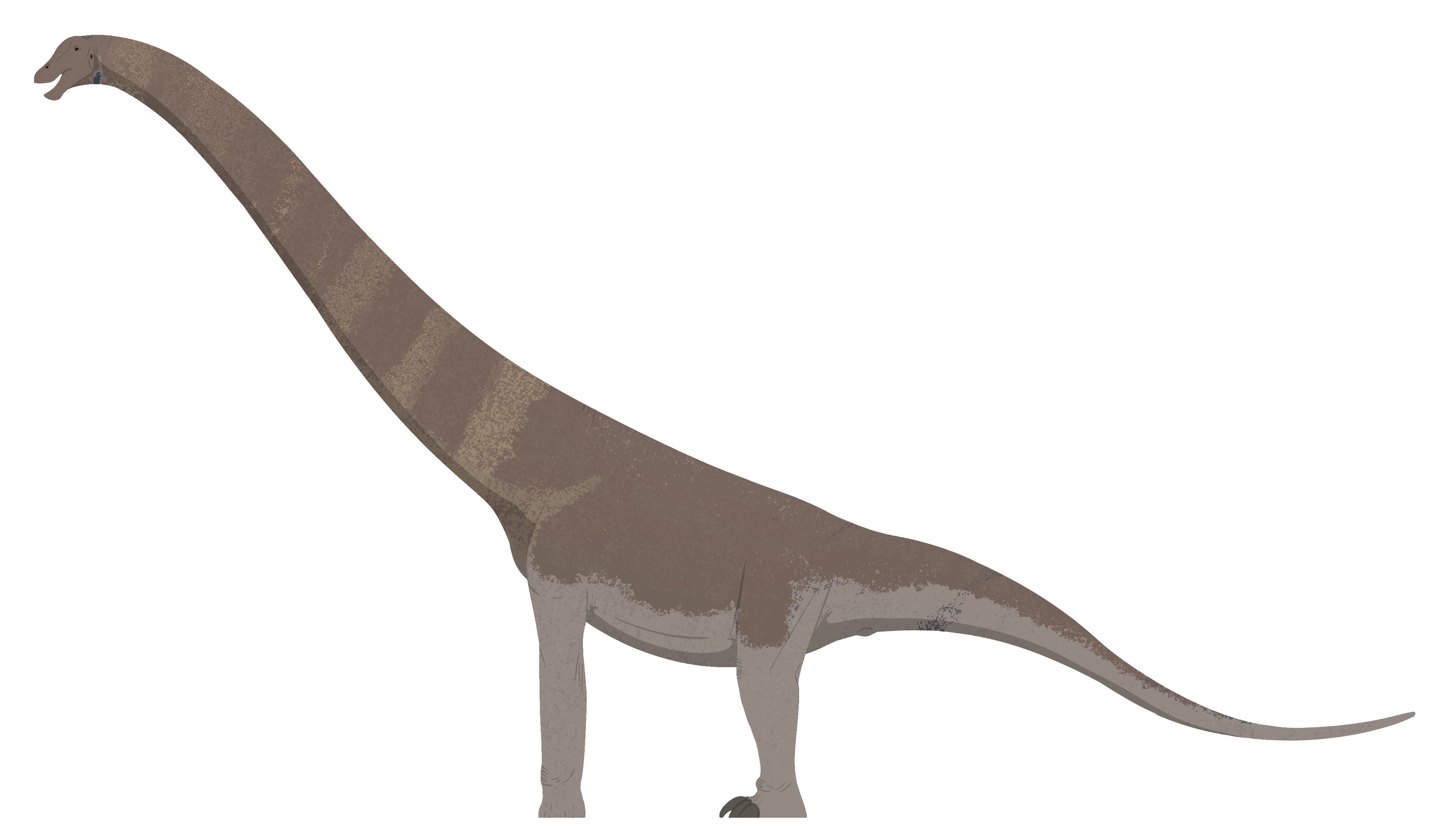
Speculative life restoration

Arrudatitan grew up to 15 metres (49 ft) when fully grown, based on the size of the holotype. The femur length of Arrudatitan is 1.55 metres (5.1 ft).

== Classification ==
The species Aeolosaurus maximus was named by Santucci and De Arruda-Campos in 2011 for titanosaur remains recovered in the Adamantina Formation of Brazil. However, subsequent cladistic analyses, such as those by Silva et al. in 2019 and Hechenleitner et al. in 2020 have considered A. maximus to be outside Aeolosaurus, the former analysis finding it to be sister to Rinconsauria and the latter finding it to be closely related to a clade consisting of Punatitan and the other two Aeolosaurus species. In light of this, Silva et al. transferred it to the new genus Arrudatitan, after Brazilian paleontologist Antonio Celso de Arruda Campos.

A cladogram of the phylogenetic analysis performed by Silva et al., 2021 is shown below:

- Rinconsauria
  - Rinconsaurus
  - - Muyelensaurus
    - Aeolosaurini
      - - Uberabatitan
        - - Gondwanatitan
          - Bravasaurus
          - Trigonosaurus
      - - Overosaurus
        - - Arrudatitan
          - - Punatitan
            - - Aeolosaurus rionegrinus
              - Aeolosaurus colhuehuapensis
