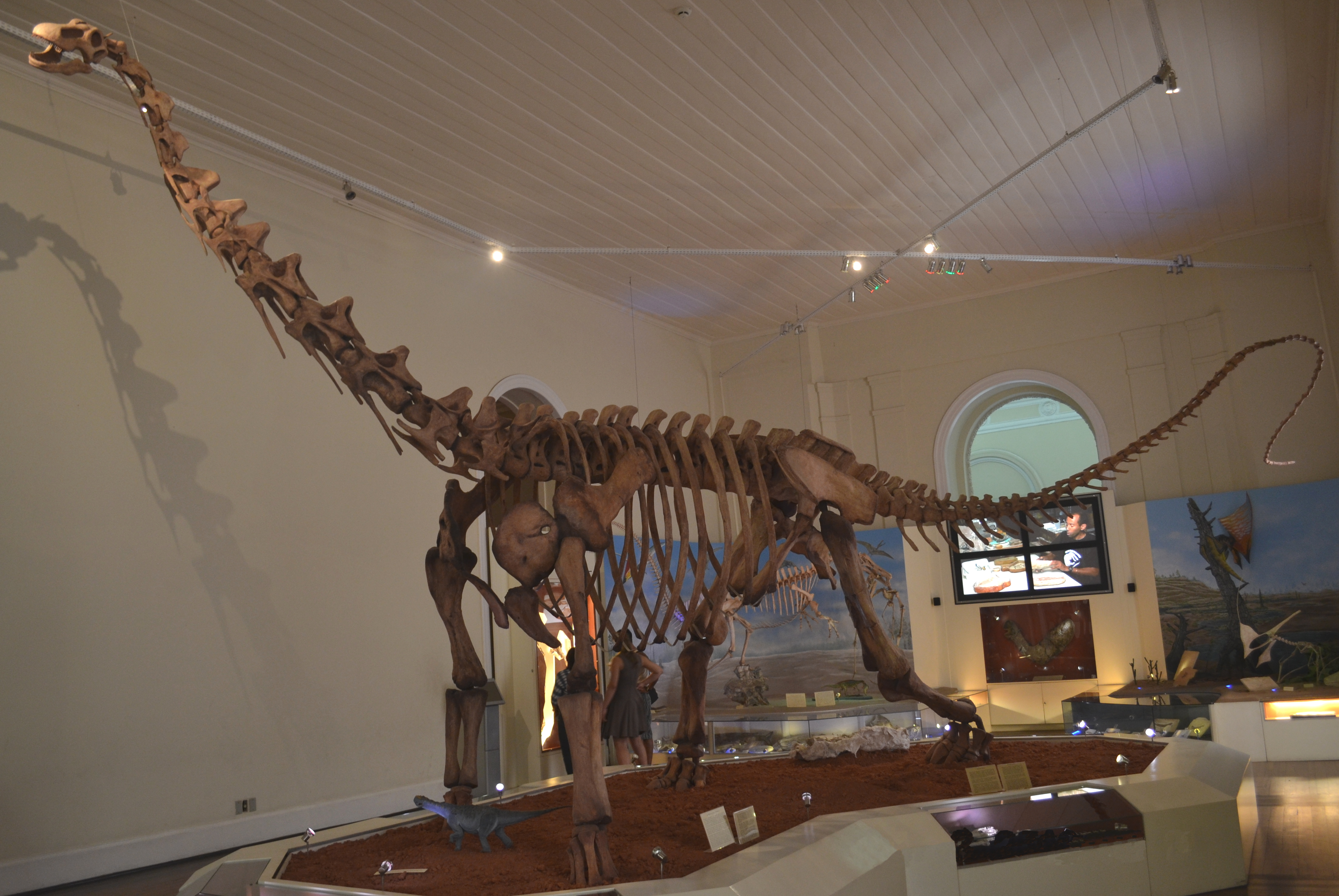
- Maxakalisaurus skeleton

Scientific classification
- Kingdom: Animalia
- Phylum: Chordata
- Class: Reptilia
- Clade: Dinosauria
- Clade: Saurischia
- Clade: †Sauropodomorpha
- Clade: †Sauropoda
- Clade: †Macronaria
- Clade: †Titanosauria
- Clade: †Lithostrotia
- Clade: †Aeolosaurini; Franco-Rosas et al., 2004

Genera
- †Aeolosaurus; †Arrudatitan; †Bravasaurus; †Caieiria; †Gondwanatitan; †Maxakalisaurus; †Mesetasaurus; †Overosaurus; †Panamericansaurus; †Punatitan; †Shingopana

= Aeolosaurini =

Aeolosaurini Temporal range: Cretaceous, 110–66 Ma

Extinct clade of dinosaurs

Aeolosaurini is an extinct clade of titanosaurian dinosaurs known from the Cretaceous period of South America and Tanzania. Rodrigo M. Santucci and Antonio C. de Arruda-Campos (2011) in their cladistic analysis found Aeolosaurus, Gondwanatitan, Maxakalisaurus, Panamericansaurus and Rinconsaurus to be aeolosaurins.

Aeolosaurini is characterized by several synapomorphies of the caudal vertebrae, such as angled centra, elongate prezygapophyses, and neural arches shifted anteriorly relative to the centra. In life, their tails may have been strongly curved downward as a result of these traits, which may have increased the force exerted by the caudofemoralis longus muscle in retracting the hindlimb. Some aeolosaurins, such as Shingopana and Overosaurus, were relatively small compared to other titanosaurs, whereas others, such as Aeolosaurus maximus, were large.

== Phylogeny ==
Aeolosaurini was defined by Franco-Rosas, Salgado, Rosas and Carvalho (2004) as the stem-based taxon that corresponds to the most-inclusive clade containing Aeolosaurus rionegrinus and Gondwanatitan faustoi, but not Saltasaurus loricatus and Opisthocoelicaudia skarzynskii. Below is a cladogram showing the phylogenetic relationships of Aeolosaurini-based Santucci and Arruda-Campos (2011), from França et al. (2016) on the left, and Silva et al. (2019) on the right.

- Lithostrotia
  - Malawisaurus
  - - Muyelensaurus
    - - Nemegtosauridae
        - Nemegtosaurus
        - - Tapuiasaurus
          - Rapetosaurus
      - Saltasauroidea
        - Diamantinasaurus
        - Baurutitan
        - Isisaurus
        - Saltasauridae
          - - Alamosaurus
            - Opisthocoelicaudia
          - - Neuquensaurus
            - Saltasaurus
        - Aeolosaurini
          - Maxakalisaurus
          - Panamericansaurus
          - Rinconsaurus
          - - Gondwanatitan
            - - Aeolosaurus maximus
              - - Aeolosaurus colhuehuapensis
                - Aeolosaurus rionegrinus

- - - Maxakalisaurus
    - Tapuiasaurus
    - Trigonosaurus
  - - Lirainosaurus
    - - Ampelosaurus
      - Bonitasaura
      - Dreadnoughtus
      - Saltasauridae
        - - Alamosaurus
          - Opisthocoelicaudia
        - Saltasaurinae
          - Neuquensaurus
          - - Rocasaurus
            - Saltasaurus
      - Aeolosaurini
        - Rapetosaurus
        - - Brasilotitan
          - Uberabatitan
          - - - Aeolosaurus maximus
              - Rinconsauria
                - Muyelensaurus
                - Rinconsaurus
            - - Overosaurus
              - - Gondwanatitan
                - Aeolosaurus colhuehuapensis
                - Aeolosaurus rionegrinus
