= Muyelensaurus =

Muyelensaurus Temporal range: late Coniacian-early Santonian ~86–85 Ma

Scientific classification
- Kingdom: Animalia
- Phylum: Chordata
- Class: Reptilia
- Clade: Dinosauria
- Clade: Saurischia
- Clade: †Sauropodomorpha
- Clade: †Sauropoda
- Clade: †Eusauropoda
- Clade: †Macronaria
- Clade: †Titanosauria
- Clade: †Rinconsauria
- Genus: †Muyelensaurus; Calvo et al. 2007

Species
- †M. pecheni Calvo et al. 2007 (type)

Extinct genus of dinosaurs

Muyelensaurus (meaning "Muyelen lizard", after an indigenous name for the Colorado River in Argentina) is a genus of titanosaurian sauropod dinosaur from the Late Cretaceous of Argentina. It was more slender than other titanosaurs. Fossils have been recovered in the Neuquén province of Patagonia and were originally assigned to the Portezuelo Formation but further research showed that these layers belong to the Plottier Formation. The type species is M. pecheni. The name Muyelensaurus first appeared in a 2007 paper by Argentine paleontologists Jorge Calvo of the Universidad Nacional del Comahue and Bernardo González Riga of the Laboratorio de Paleovertebrados, and Brazilian paleontologist Juan Porfiri of the Universidade Federal do Rio de Janeiro.

== Description ==
Autapomorphic to Muyelensaurus was the basal tuber of the braincase having a divergence angle that was a right angle.

== Classification ==
The cladogram below follows Franca et al. (2016), placing Muyelensaurus as a basal lithostrotian.

- Lithostrotia
  - Malawisaurus
  - - Muyelensaurus
    - - Nemegtosauridae
        - Nemegtosaurus
        - - Tapuiasaurus
          - Rapetosaurus
      - Saltasauroidea
        - Diamantinasaurus
        - Baurutitan
        - Isisaurus
        - Saltasauridae
          - - Alamosaurus
            - Opisthocoelicaudia
          - - Neuquensaurus
            - Saltasaurus
        - Aeolosaurini
          - Maxakalisaurus
          - Panamericansaurus
          - Rinconsaurus
          - - Gondwanatitan
            - - Aeolosaurus maximus
              - - Aeolosaurus colhuehuapensis
                - Aeolosaurus rionegrinus

The cladogram below follows Mocho et al. (2019), this time placing Muyelensaurus within Rinconsauria.

- Lithostrotia
  - Malawisaurus
  - - - Paludititan
      - Lohuecotitan
    - - Epachthosaurus
      - - - Opisthocoelicaudiinae
            - Alamosaurus
            - Opisthocoelicaudia
        - - - Saltasaurinae
              - Neuquensaurus
              - - Rocasaurus
                - Saltasaurus
          - - - Lirainosaurinae
                - Lirainosaurus
                - - Atsinganosaurus
                  - Ampelosaurus
            - - Bonatitan
              - - - Rapetosaurus
                  - Nemegtosaurus
                - - Aeolosaurinae
                    - Gondwanatitan
                    - Aeolosaurus
                  - Rinconsauria
                    - Rinconsaurus
                    - - Muyelensaurus
                      - - Bonitasaura
                        - Lognkosauria
                          - Mendozasaurus
                          - Futalognkosaurus
