= Panamericansaurus =

Panamericansaurus Temporal range: Late Cretaceous, 79–69 Ma

Scientific classification
- Domain: Eukaryota
- Kingdom: Animalia
- Phylum: Chordata
- Clade: Dinosauria
- Clade: Saurischia
- Clade: †Sauropodomorpha
- Clade: †Sauropoda
- Clade: †Macronaria
- Clade: †Titanosauria
- Clade: †Lithostrotia
- Clade: †Aeolosaurini
- Genus: †Panamericansaurus; Calvo & Porfiri, 2010
- Species: †P. schroederi

Binomial name
- †Panamericansaurus schroederi Calvo & Porfiri, 2010

Extinct genus of dinosaurs

Panamericansaurus (meaning "Pan American Energy lizard") is a genus of titanosaurian sauropod dinosaur from the Late Cretaceous Period of Argentina. The holotype is very similar to known fossil material of Aeolosaurus, which Panamericansaurus is thought to be closely related to.

== Discovery and naming ==
The type species Panamericansaurus schroederi was named and described by Jorge Orlando Calvo and Juan Domingo Porfiri in 2010. The generic name refers to the Pan American Energy company which financially supported the paleontological investigations. The specific name honours the Schroeder family on whose land the remains were found. The describers placed Panamericansaurus in a clade within the Titanosauridae, the Aeolosaurini, of which also Aeolosaurus and Gondwanatitan are also members.

The holotype, MUCPv-417, was found in June 2003 in a layer of the Allen Formation (Campanian-Maastrichtian) near San Patricio del Chañar, in Neuquén, Argentina. It consists of five tail vertebrae, a sacral vertebra, a left humerus, haemal arches and rib fragments. The humerus is 123 centimetres long. The length of the holotype individual has been estimated at 11 metres (36 feet).
