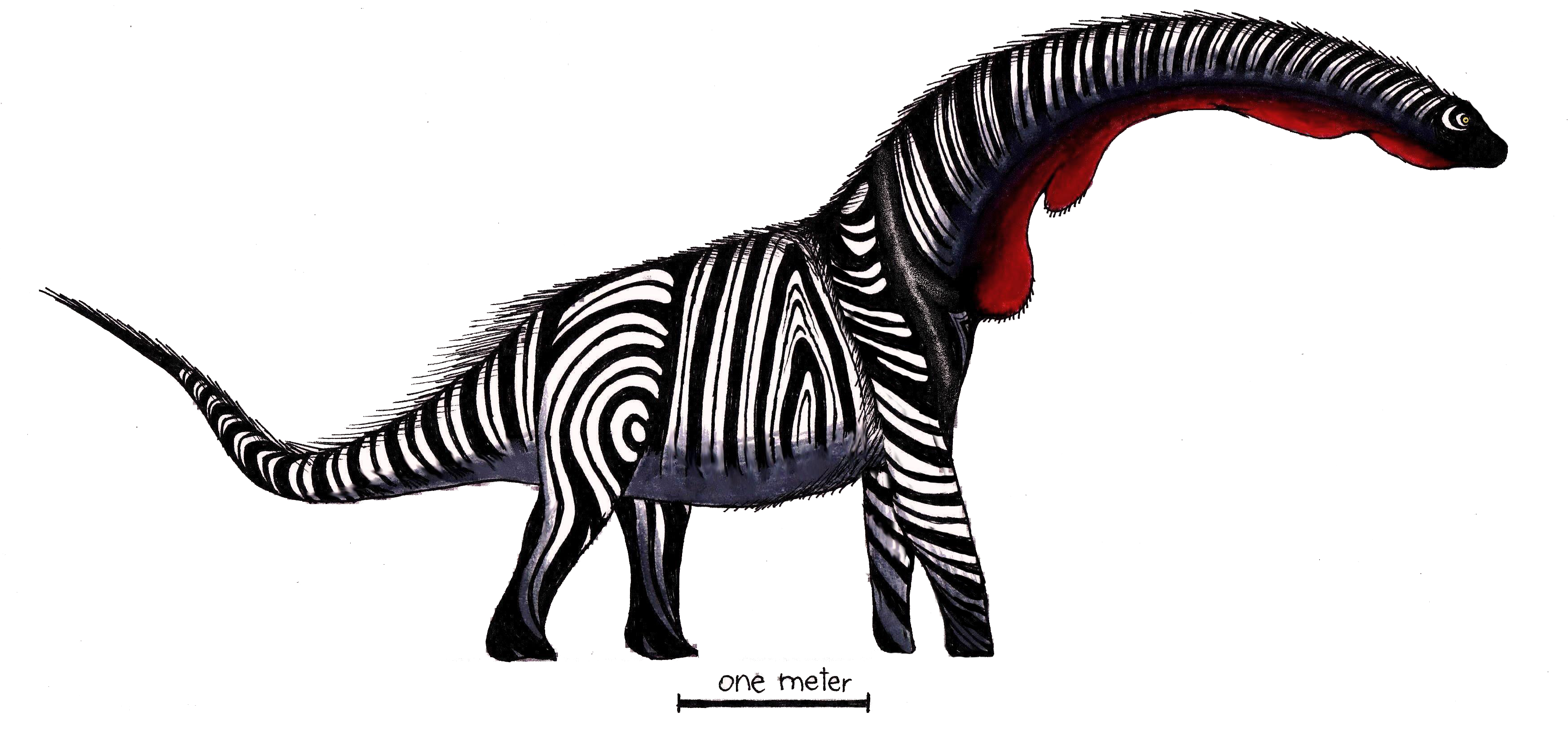
- Overosaurus life restoration

Scientific classification
- Kingdom: Animalia
- Phylum: Chordata
- Class: Reptilia
- Clade: Dinosauria
- Clade: Saurischia
- Clade: †Sauropodomorpha
- Clade: †Sauropoda
- Clade: †Macronaria
- Clade: †Titanosauria
- Clade: †Lithostrotia
- Genus: †Overosaurus; Coria et al., 2013
- Species: †O. paradasorum

Binomial name
- †Overosaurus paradasorum Coria et al., 2013

= Overosaurus =

Overosaurus Temporal range: Santonian ~86.3–83.6 Ma

Extinct genus of dinosaurs

Overosaurus (meaning "Overo lizard", after the Cerro Overo locality) is an extinct genus of sauropod dinosaurs, containing only a single species, Overosaurus paradasorum. This species lived approximately 86 to 84 million years ago during the latter part of the Cretaceous Period in what is now Patagonia (in southern Argentina). Overosaurus paradasorum was relatively small compared to other sauropods from Patagonia, like the saltasaurids and other aeolosaurines, estimated as approximately 10 m (33 ft). It was a ground-dwelling herbivore.

== Discovery and naming ==
The only known specimen of Overosaurus paradasorum was recovered at the Cerro Overo locality in Patagonia, Argentina. The specimen was collected in 2002 by researchers from the Museo Carmen Funes, the Museo Argentino Urquiza, and the Natural History Museum of Los Angeles County, in terrestrial sediments deposited during the Campanian stage of the Late Cretaceous period, approximately 84 to 78 million years ago. This specimen is housed in the collection of the Museo Argentino Urquiza in Neuquén, Argentina. The specimen was found by Carlos Parada and family, who provided logistic support to museum staff as well as assistance during fieldwork. The Cerro Overo locality was originally reported as within the Anacleto Formation of the Neuquén Group, but is now attributed to the Bajo de la Carpa Formation.

== Description ==
Overosaurus was described and named by Rodolfo A. Coria, Leonardo S. Filippi, Luis M. Chiappe, Rodolfo García and Andrea B. Arcucci in 2013. This species is known solely from the holotype MAU-Pv-CO-439 which consists of a fully articulated vertebral series from the 10th cervical to the 20th caudal vertebra, the ribs of the last three cervical vertebrae, six right dorsal ribs (articulated with their respective dorsal vertebrae 2,3,4,5,8,9), five left dorsal ribs (articulated with their respective dorsal vertebrae 2,3,4,5,8), the proximal portions of dorsal ribs of both sides of dorsal vertebrae 9 and 10, a complete right ilium and a fragmented left ilium. Specifically the vertebral series includes the last four cervical vertebrae, ten dorsal vertebrae, six sacral vertebrae, and twenty caudal vertebrae. Its sacrum consists of six fused sacral vertebrae.

== Classification ==
Overosaurus was differentiated from other titanosaur taxa using a unique combination of characters present in the ilium and in the cervical, dorsal and caudal vertebrae. A phylogenetic analysis of Lithostrotia placed Overosaurus within the Aeolosaurini, as the sister taxon of a monophyletic group formed by Gondwanatitan faustoi, Pitekunsaurus macayai, Aeolosaurus rionegrinus, and Aeolosaurus maximus.
