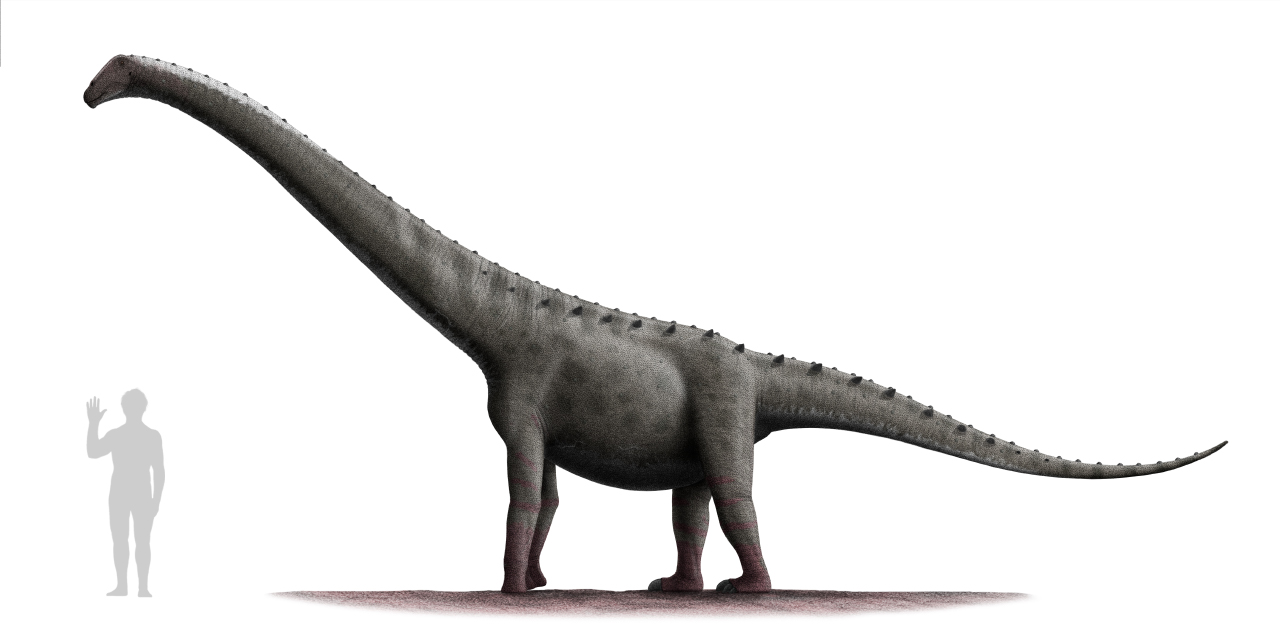
- Life restoration comparing the animal's size with a human

Scientific classification
- Kingdom: Animalia
- Phylum: Chordata
- Class: Reptilia
- Clade: Dinosauria
- Clade: Saurischia
- Clade: †Sauropodomorpha
- Clade: †Sauropoda
- Clade: †Macronaria
- Clade: †Titanosauria
- Clade: †Rinconsauria
- Genus: †Rinconsaurus; Calvo & González Riga, 2003

Type species
- †Rinconsaurus caudamirus Calvo & González Riga, 2003

= Rinconsaurus =

Rinconsaurus Temporal range: 86–83 Ma Late Cretaceous

Extinct genus of dinosaurs

Rinconsaurus is a genus of titanosaur sauropod dinosaur from the Late Cretaceous in what is now Argentina. The type species, Rinconsaurus caudamirus, was described by Calvo and Riga in 2003, and is based on three partial skeletons.

== Description ==
Like all sauropods, Rinconsaurus was a large long-necked quadrupedal animal, with a long, whip-like tail and four pillar-like legs. Rinconsaurus was an unusually slender sauropod. Although fossil discoveries are incomplete, and no complete necks or heads have been found, fully grown Rinconsaurus are estimated to have been 11 meters (36 ft) long and approximately 2.5 meters (8 ft) high at the shoulder. The body mass of Rinconsaurus has been estimated to be between 3.21 and 5.39 tonnes.

== Discovery and species ==
Fossils of Rinconsaurus were discovered in 1997 by Gabriel Benítezin strata belonging to the Bajo de la Carpa Formation near Rincón de los Sauces, in the Neuquen province of Argentina. The fossils, which consisted of three individuals (two adults and one juvenile), were excavated by Jorge Calvo of the Paleontology Museum of the National University of Comahue.

The type, and only known species, Rinconsaurus caudamirus, was described by Calvo and Bernardo J. González Riga of the Paleovertebrate Laboratory in Mendoza, Argentina, in 2003. The authors noted derived traits unique to the genus, including distinctive tail vertebrae with bony processes. The fossil remains included vertebrae, limb bones, scapula, hip bones (pubis, ilium, and ischium) and several ribs. Two teeth are also known. These teeth resemble those of another titanosaurid, Malawisaurus dixeyi. Calvo and González Riga initially interpreted two elements as belonging to the skull of Rinconsaurus, a prefrontal and part of the mandible, but these were subsequently identified as the ilium of the crocodyliform Pehuenchesuchus and part of a rib of Rinconsaurus respectively.

The generic name refers to Rincón de los Sauces, where the fossils were discovered, while the specific name, caudamirus, means "amazing in the tail" in Latin, in reference to the unusual shape of the tail vertebrae, especially a strange sequence of procoelous, amphicoelous, opisthocoelous, biconvex and ultimately again procoelous vertebrae shown by one individual.

== Classification ==
Rinconsaurus is a titanosaurid sauropod. Within the titanosaurs, Calvo and Riga regard this dinosaur as closely related to Aeolosaurus based on several derived traits. In 2007, Casal et al. assigned Rinconsaurus, Gondwanatitan, and Aeolosaurus to the Aeolosauridae, a proposed stem-based clade of titanosaurs. Rinconsaurus would form a smaller clade Rinconsauria with Muyelensaurus. It remains to be seen, however, if this classification will receive widespread acceptance.

== Paleobiology ==
=== Diet ===
Rinconsaurus, like all sauropods, was an herbivore. Fossilized dung associated with late Cretaceous titanosaurids has revealed phytoliths, silicified plant fragments, that offer clues to a broad, unselective plant diet. Besides the plant remains that might have been expected, such as cycads and conifers, discoveries published in 2005 revealed an unexpectedly wide range of monocotyledons, including palms and grasses (Poaceae), including ancestors of rice and bamboo, which has given rise to speculation that herbivorous dinosaurs and grasses co-evolved.

Titanosaurid teeth are usually spatulate (spoon-shaped) or shaped like pegs. Teeth found in association with Rinconsaurus have been described as "pencil-chisel-like teeth" and had sharply inclined wear facets. Without the ability to grind food, Rinconsaurus, like other sauropods, would have stripped foliage.
