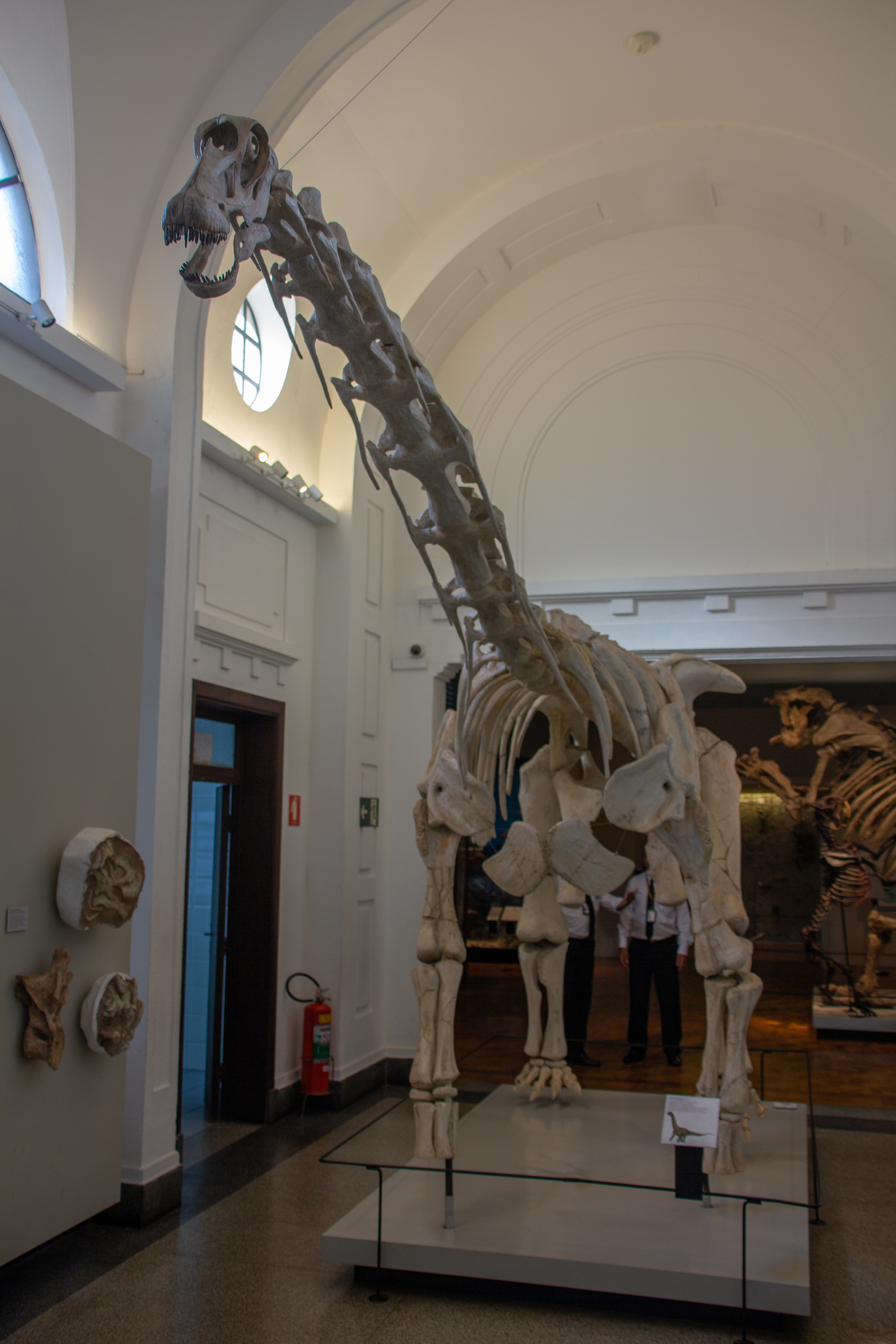
- Reconstructed skeleton, Museum of Zoology of the University of São Paulo

Scientific classification
- Kingdom: Animalia
- Phylum: Chordata
- Class: Reptilia
- Clade: Dinosauria
- Clade: Saurischia
- Clade: †Sauropodomorpha
- Clade: †Sauropoda
- Clade: †Macronaria
- Clade: †Titanosauria
- Genus: †Tapuiasaurus; Zaher et al. 2011
- Species: †T. macedoi

Binomial name
- †Tapuiasaurus macedoi Zaher et al. 2011

= Tapuiasaurus =

Tapuiasaurus Temporal range: Aptian ~125 Ma

Extinct species of reptile

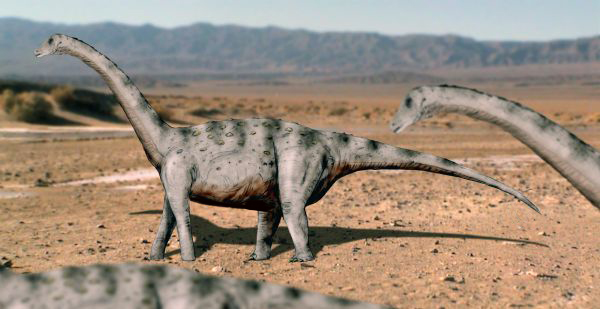
Restoration

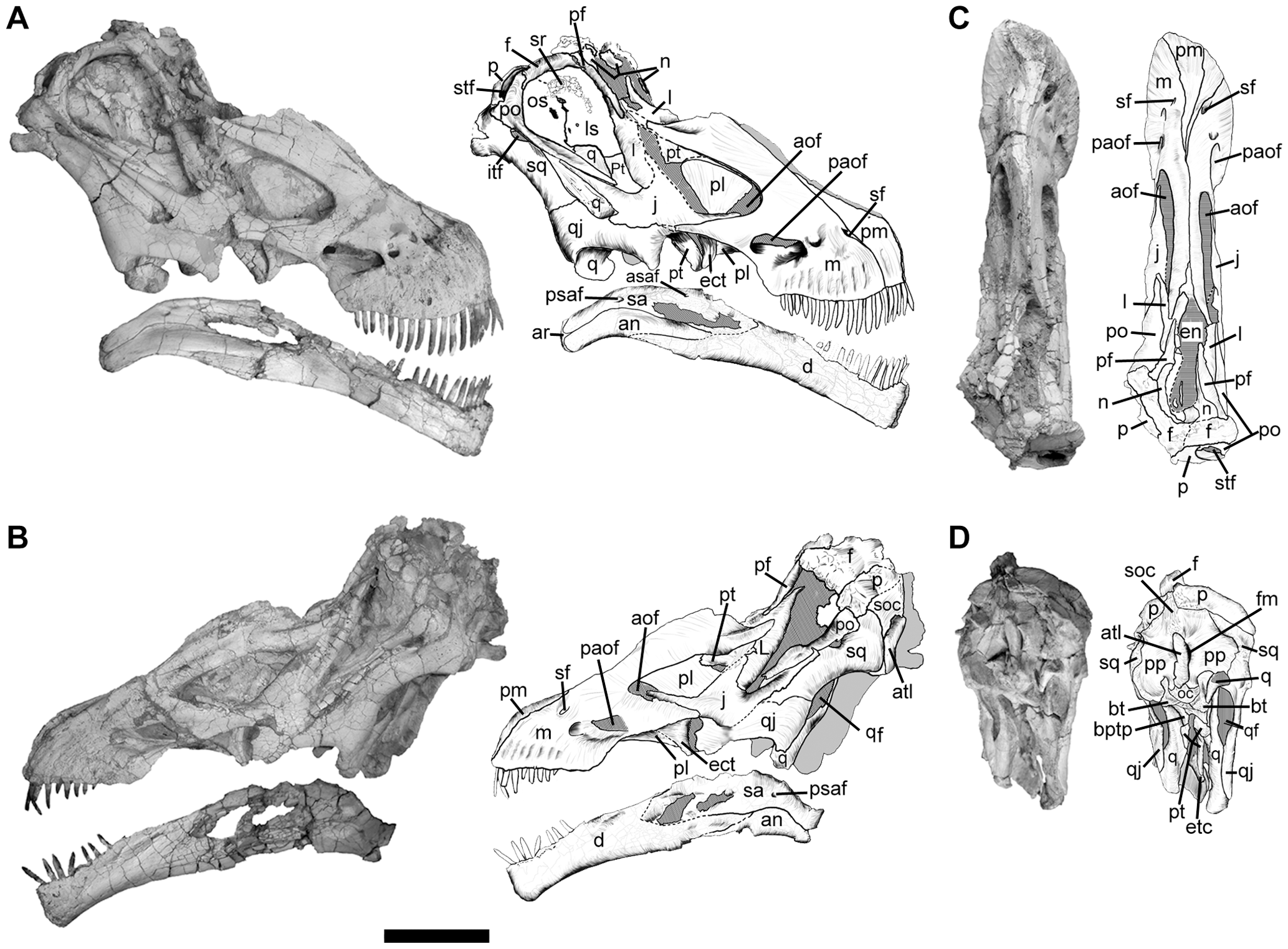
Skull of the type specimen

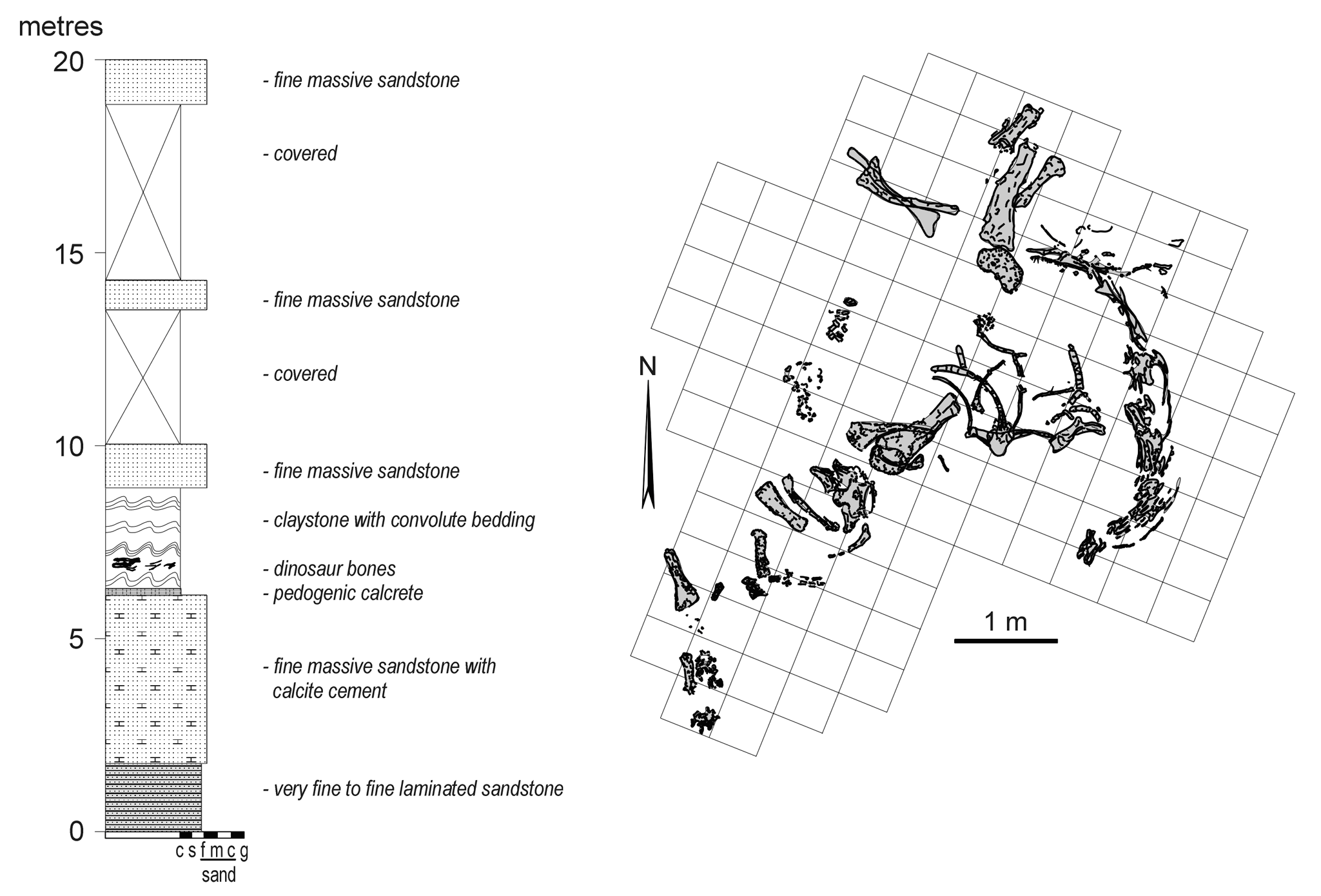
The view of the fossils when discovered

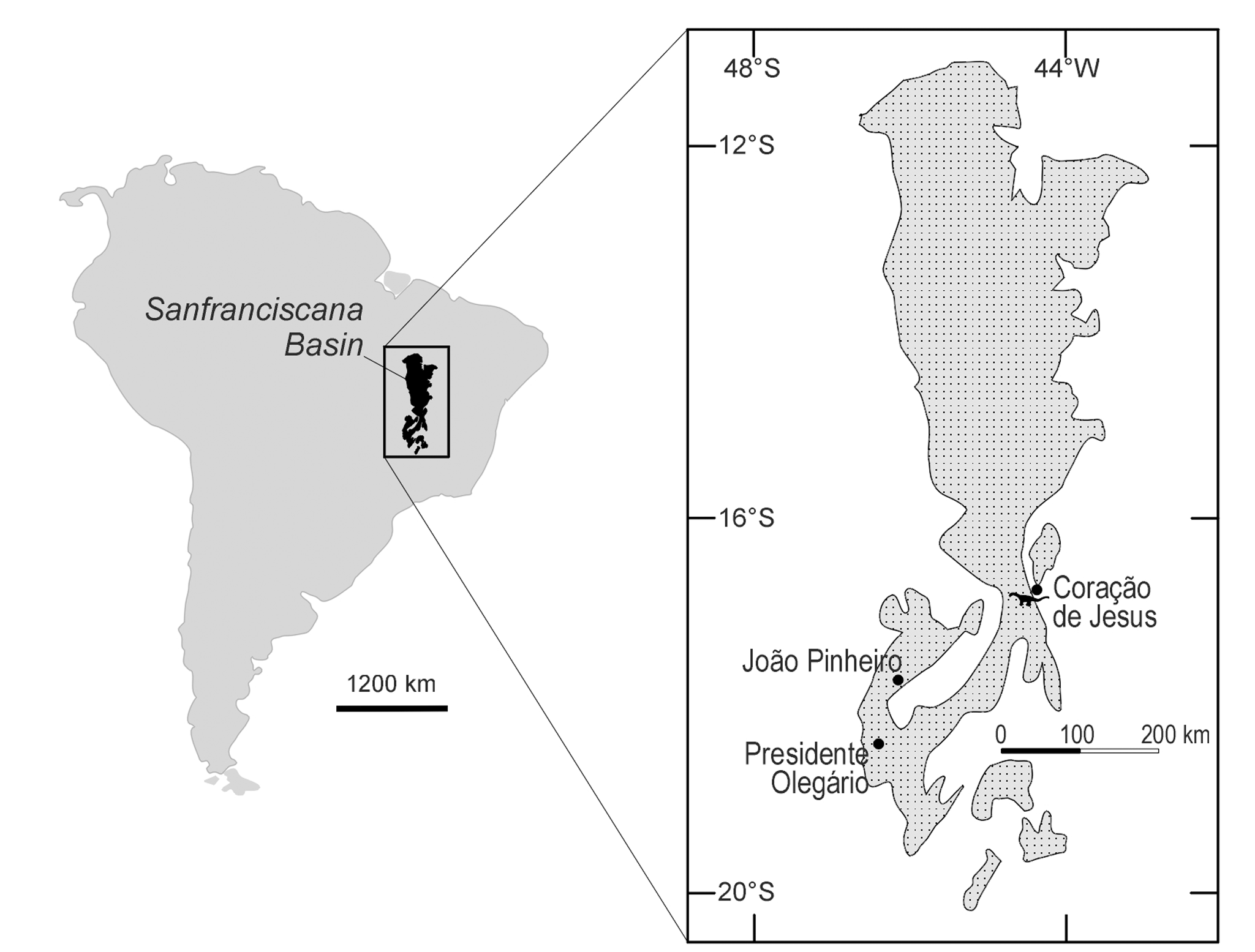
Location of where the fossils were found

Tapuiasaurus (meaning "Tapuia lizard") is a genus of titanosaur which lived during the Lower Cretaceous period (Aptian age) in what is now Minas Gerais, Brazil.

== Discovery ==
Its fossils, including a partial skeleton with a nearly complete skull, have been recovered from the Quiricó Formation of the São Francisco Basin in Minas Gerais, eastern Brazil. This genus was named a team of researchers led by Hussam Zaher, including Diego Pol, Alberto B. Carvalho, Paulo M. Nascimento aka Pirula (YouTuber), Claudio Riccomini, Peter Larson, Rubén Juárez Valieri, Ricardo Pires Domingues, Nelson Jorge da Silva Jr. and Diógenes de Almeida Campos, in a 2011 publication. The type species, Tapuiasaurus macedoi, was also described in this study.

== Classification ==
Tapuiasaurus was originally classified as a member of the Nemegtosauridae family by its original describers, but subsequent cladistic analyses have revealed a more complex relationship. Wilson et al. (2016) found that Tapuiasaurus falls outside the Lithostrotia shade while Carballido et al. (2017) discovered a close relationship between Tapuiasaurus and the Gondwanan lithostrotians Isisaurus and Rapetosaurus, suggesting a distant connection to Nemegtosaurus.
