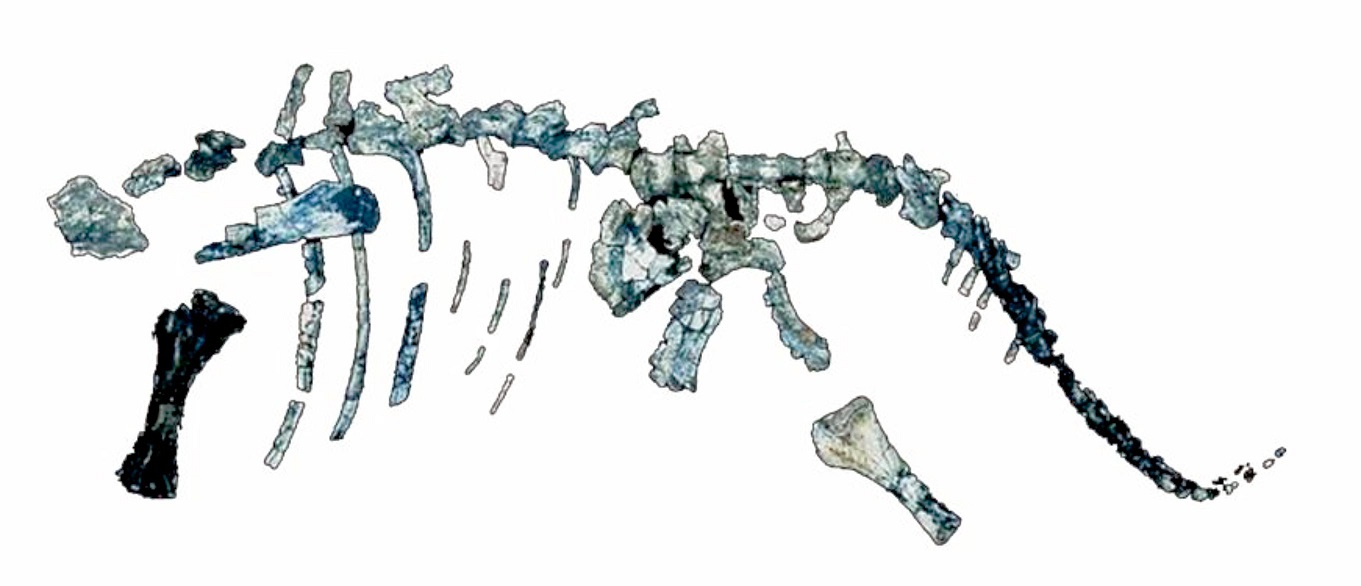
- Holotype skeleton of Gondwanatitan

Scientific classification
- Kingdom: Animalia
- Phylum: Chordata
- Class: Reptilia
- Clade: Dinosauria
- Clade: Saurischia
- Clade: †Sauropodomorpha
- Clade: †Sauropoda
- Clade: †Macronaria
- Clade: †Titanosauria
- Clade: †Lithostrotia
- Genus: †Gondwanatitan; Kellner & de Azevedo, 1999
- Species: †G. faustoi

Binomial name
- †Gondwanatitan faustoi Kellner & de Azevedo, 1999

= Gondwanatitan =

Gondwanatitan Temporal range: Late Cretaceous,70 Ma

Extinct genus of dinosaurs

Gondwanatitan (meaning "giant from Gondwana") was a titanosaurian sauropod dinosaur. Gondwanatitan was found in Brazil, at the time part of the southern supercontinent Gondwana, in the late Cretaceous Period (70 mya). Like some other sauropods, Gondwanatitan was tall and ate tough shoots and leaves from the tops of trees. Its closest relative was Aeolosaurus. The type species is Gondwanatitan faustoi, formally described by Kellner and de Azevedo in 1999.

== Etymology ==
Gondwanatitan means "Gondwana Titan", and is named after Gondwana, the supercontinent that the genus' South American range was once part of, and the Titans of classical Greek mythology. The type and only named species, G. faustoi, is a patronym honoring Dr. Fausto L. de Souza Cunha, a former curator at the Museu Nacional/UFRJ who led the excavation of the type specimen.

== Description ==
Gondwanatitan was a fairly small sauropod, only 7 meters (23 ft) long and weighing about 1 tonne (1.1 short tons). It had relatively gracile limb bones. The middle caudal vertebrae are distinctively "heart-shaped", which allows isolated caudal vertebrae to be easily distinguished from those of Aeolosaurus.

The vertebrae from the middle part of its tail had elongated centra. Gondwanatitan had vertebral lateral fossae that resembled shallow depressions. Fossae that similarly resemble shallow depressions are known from Saltasaurus, Alamosaurus, Malawisaurus, and Aeolosaurus. Its middle tail vertebrae's neural spines are angled anteriorly when the vertebrae are aligned. These vertebrae resemble those of Cedarosaurus, Venenosaurus, and Aeolosaurus.

== Classification ==
Gondwanatitan is a member of the clade Aeolosauridae. It is closely related to the genera Pitekunsaurus, Aeolosaurus, and Overosaurus.

== Provenance ==
The type specimen of Gondwanatitan faustoi was found in strata of the Adamantina Formation. Other material assigned to the genus has been found in the Cambabe Formation.

== History ==
The type specimen of Gondwanatitan faustoi was discovered in 1983 on the farm of Yoshitoshi Myzobuchi in São Paulo, Brazil. The specimen was excavated between 1984 and 1986, but preparation work on the specimen did not begin in earnest until 1997. It was finally described as a new genus and species in 1999. In 2001, G. faustoi was briefly transferred to the genus Aeolosaurus, making Gondwanatitan a junior synonym of that genus, but it has since been widely regarded as separate. Some elements of the holotype were lost in the National Museum of Brazil fire on 2 September 2018, but several elements survived the fire and were recovered.
