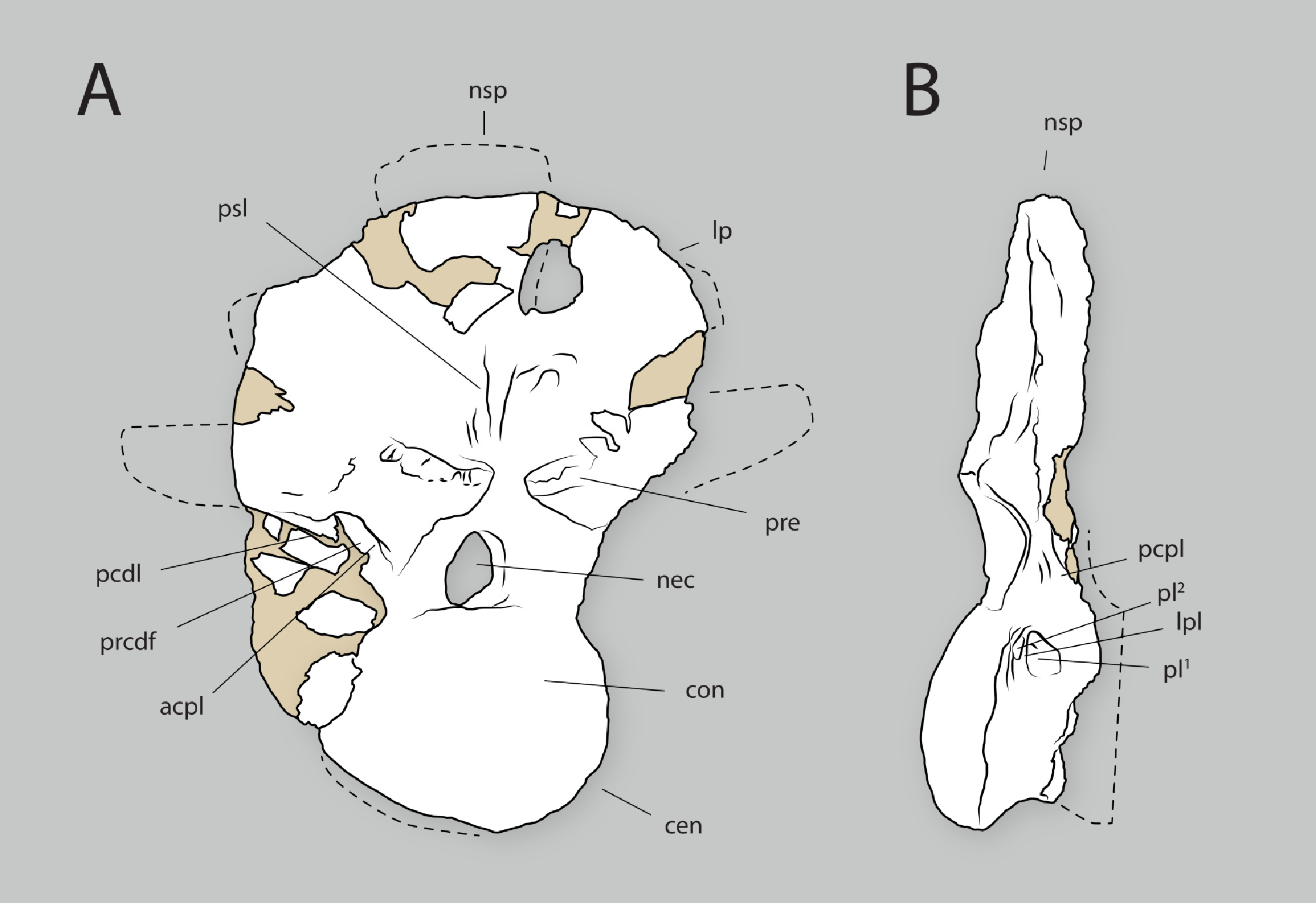
- Holotype dorsal vertebra
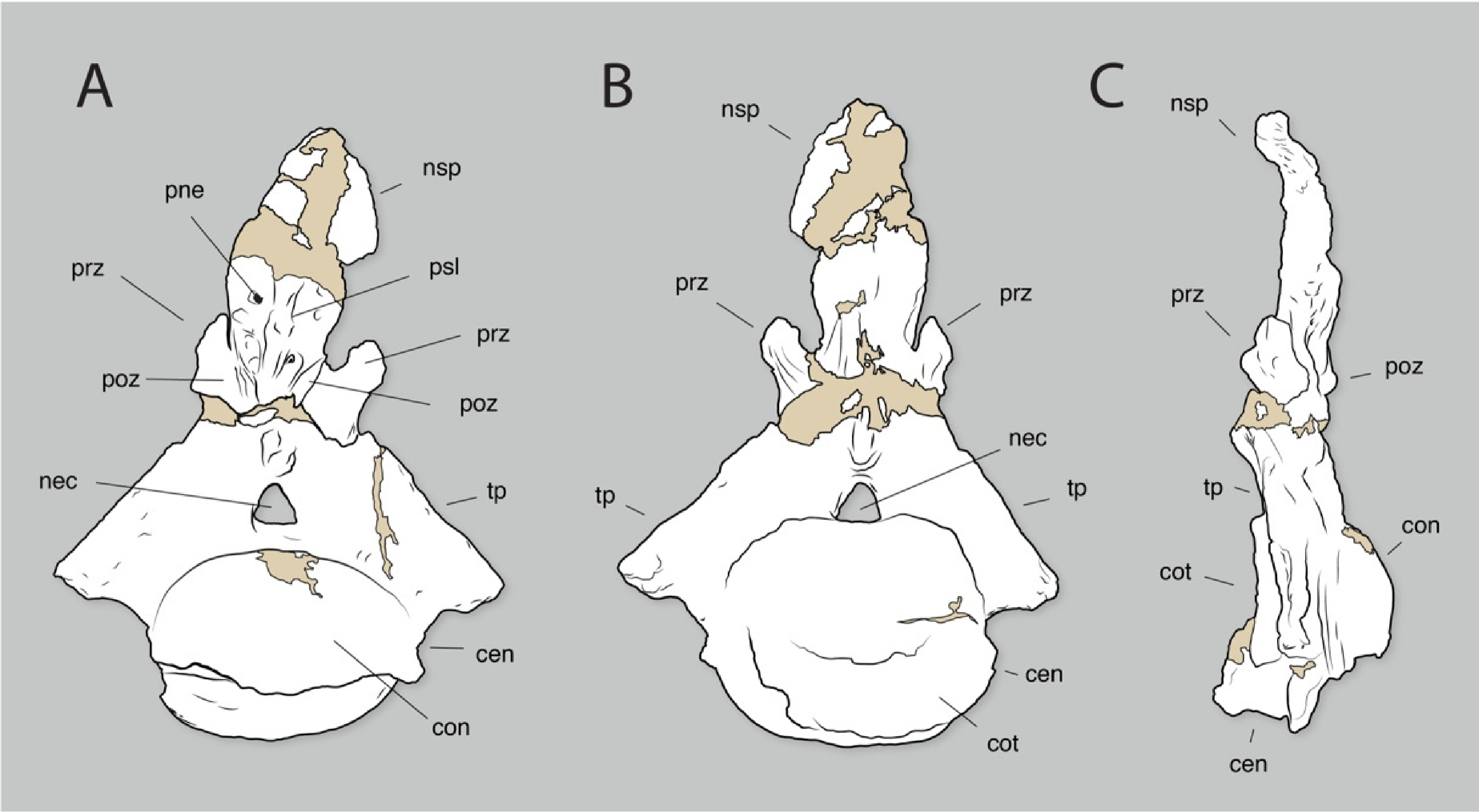
- Holotype tail vertebra

Scientific classification
- Kingdom: Animalia
- Phylum: Chordata
- Class: Reptilia
- Clade: Dinosauria
- Clade: Saurischia
- Clade: †Sauropodomorpha
- Clade: †Sauropoda
- Clade: †Eusauropoda
- Clade: †Macronaria
- Clade: †Titanosauria
- Family: †Argentinosauridae
- Genus: †Phosphatotitan; Longrich et al., 2026
- Species: †P. khouribgaensis

Binomial name
- †Phosphatotitan khouribgaensis Longrich et al., 2026

= Phosphatotitan =

Phosphatotitan Temporal range: Late Cretaceous, late Maastrichtian

Genus of sauropod dinosaur

Phosphatotitan (lit. 'phosphate giant') is an extinct genus of titanosaurian sauropod dinosaur known from the Late Cretaceous (Maastrichtian age) Ouled Abdoun Basin of Morocco. The genus contains a single species, Phosphatotitan khouribgaensis, known from a partial skeleton.

== Discovery and naming ==
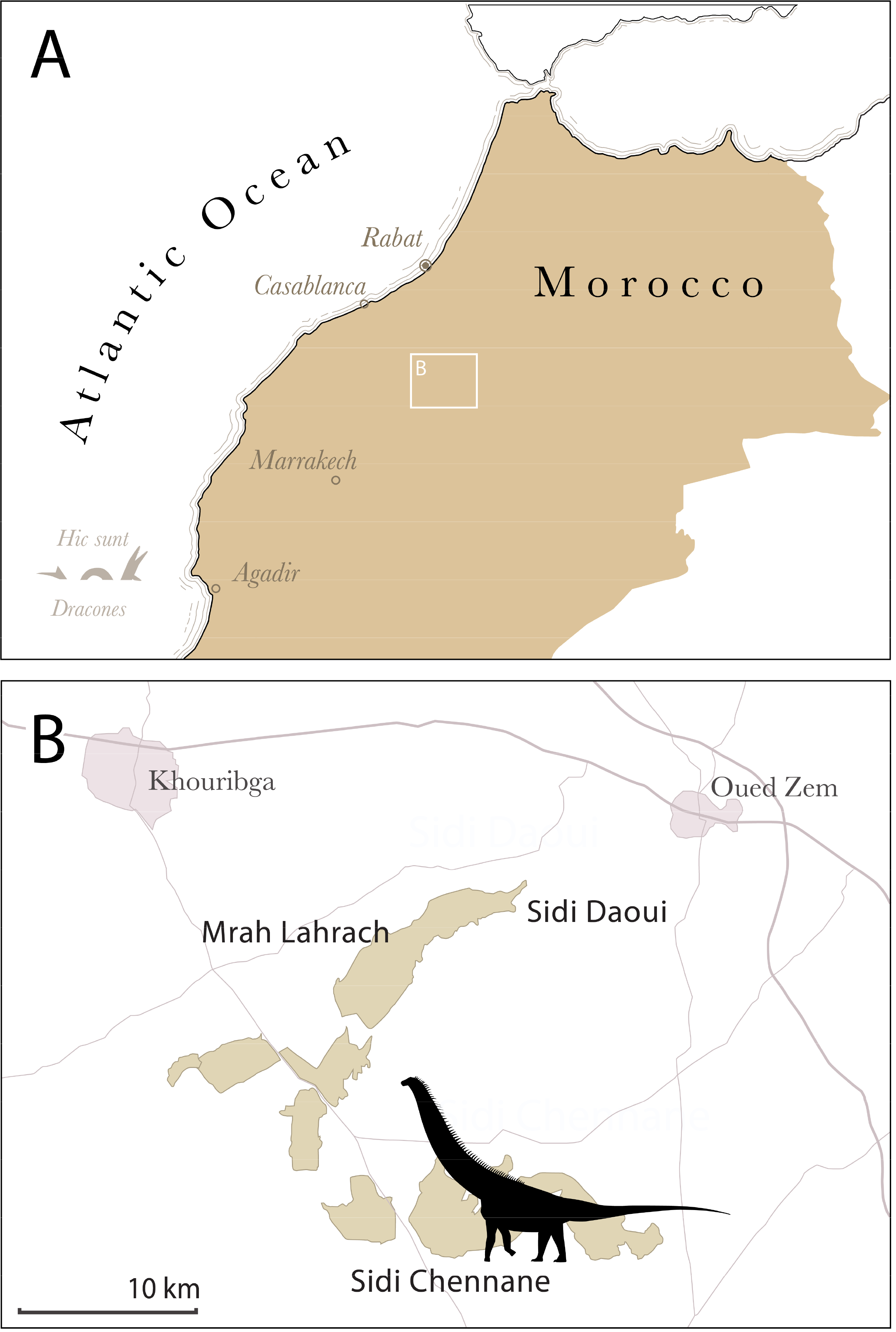
Discovery locality of Phosphatotitan

The Phosphatotitan fossil material was discovered in outcrops of the Sidi Chennane phosphate mine (Lower Couche III) of the Ouled Abdoun Basin in Khouribga Province, Morocco. The specimen is housed in the Natural History Museum of Marrakesh (Muséum d'Histoire naturelle de Marrakech), in Marrakesh, Morocco, where it is permanently accessioned as specimen MHNM.KHG.888. The specimen consists of a fragmentary associated skeleton comprising some vertebrae (one dorsal (trunk vertebra, a sacrum with at least four vertebrae, and one caudal (tail) vertebra) and parts of the pelvis (fragmentary ilium, both pubes, and possibly part of the ischium). Taphonomic damage to the specimen has resulted in it becoming cracked and crushed.

In 2026, Nicholas R. Longrich and colleagues described Phosphatotitan khouribgaensis as a new genus and species of titanosaur based on these fossil remains, establishing MHNM.KHG.888 as the holotype specimen. The generic name, Phosphatotitan, combines a reference to the Moroccan phosphate deposits from which the fossils were recovered, with the word "titan" (lit. 'giant'), a common suffix for sauropod names, referencing the pre-Olympian gods of Greek mythology. The specific name, khouribgaensis, references the discovery of the holotype in Khouribga Province.

== Description ==
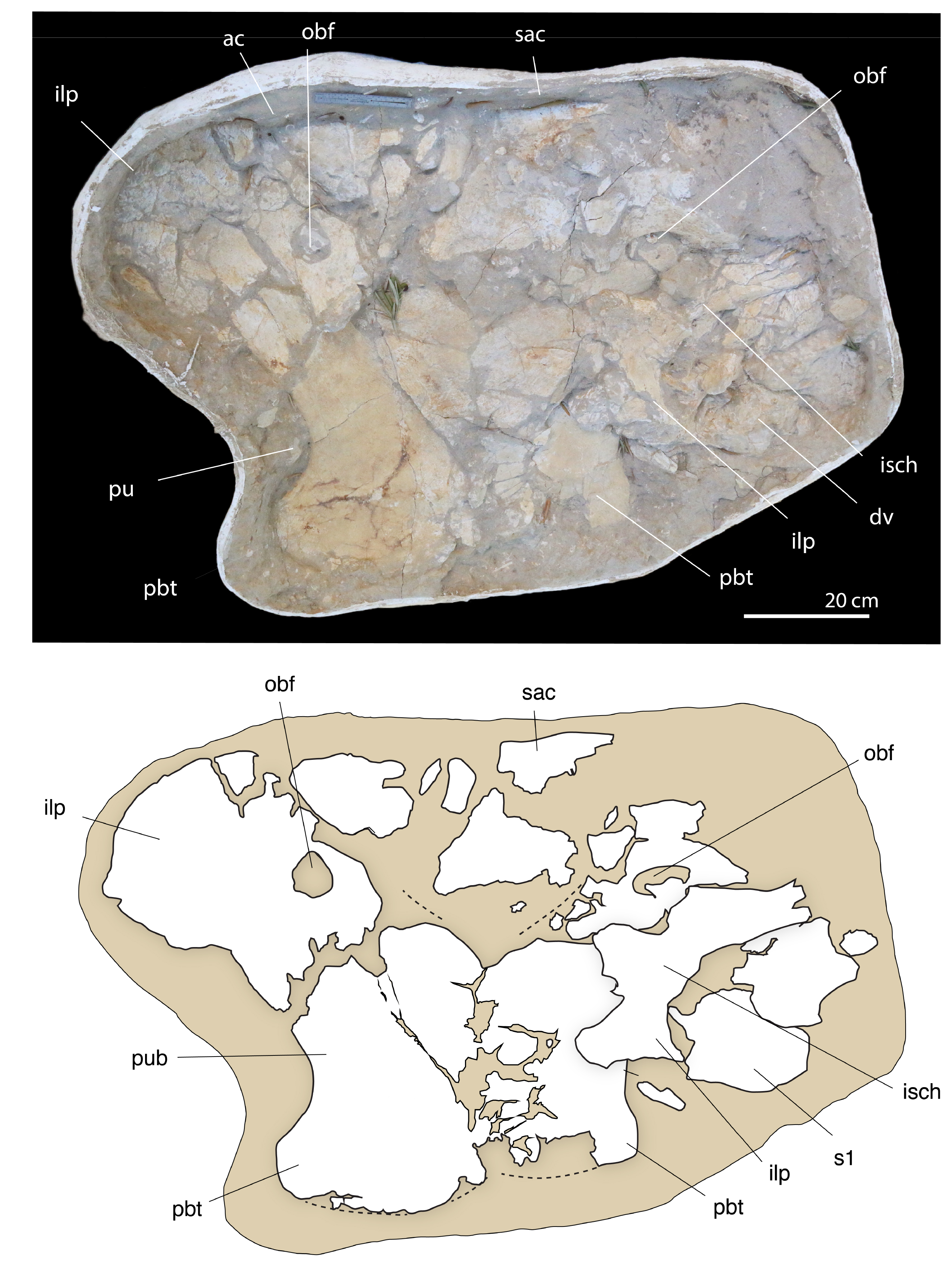
Pelvic bones (pubes and possible ischium) of the holotype

While Phosphatotitan is large in relation to the non-sauropod dinosaurs it coexisted with, it is significantly smaller than its closest relatives within the titanosaur clade Lognkosauria, which include Patagotitan, which is estimated to have been 30–40 metres (98–131 ft) long and 57–69 tonnes (63–76 short tons) in weight. With a dorsal vertebral centrum height of 15.9 centimetres (6.3 in), the linear dimensions of the Phosphatotitan fossils are about 39.75% of those of Patagotitan. As such, its weight can be calculated to be between 3.5 and 4.3 tonnes (3.9 and 4.7 short tons), around 6.3% of the mass of Patagotitan.

== Classification ==
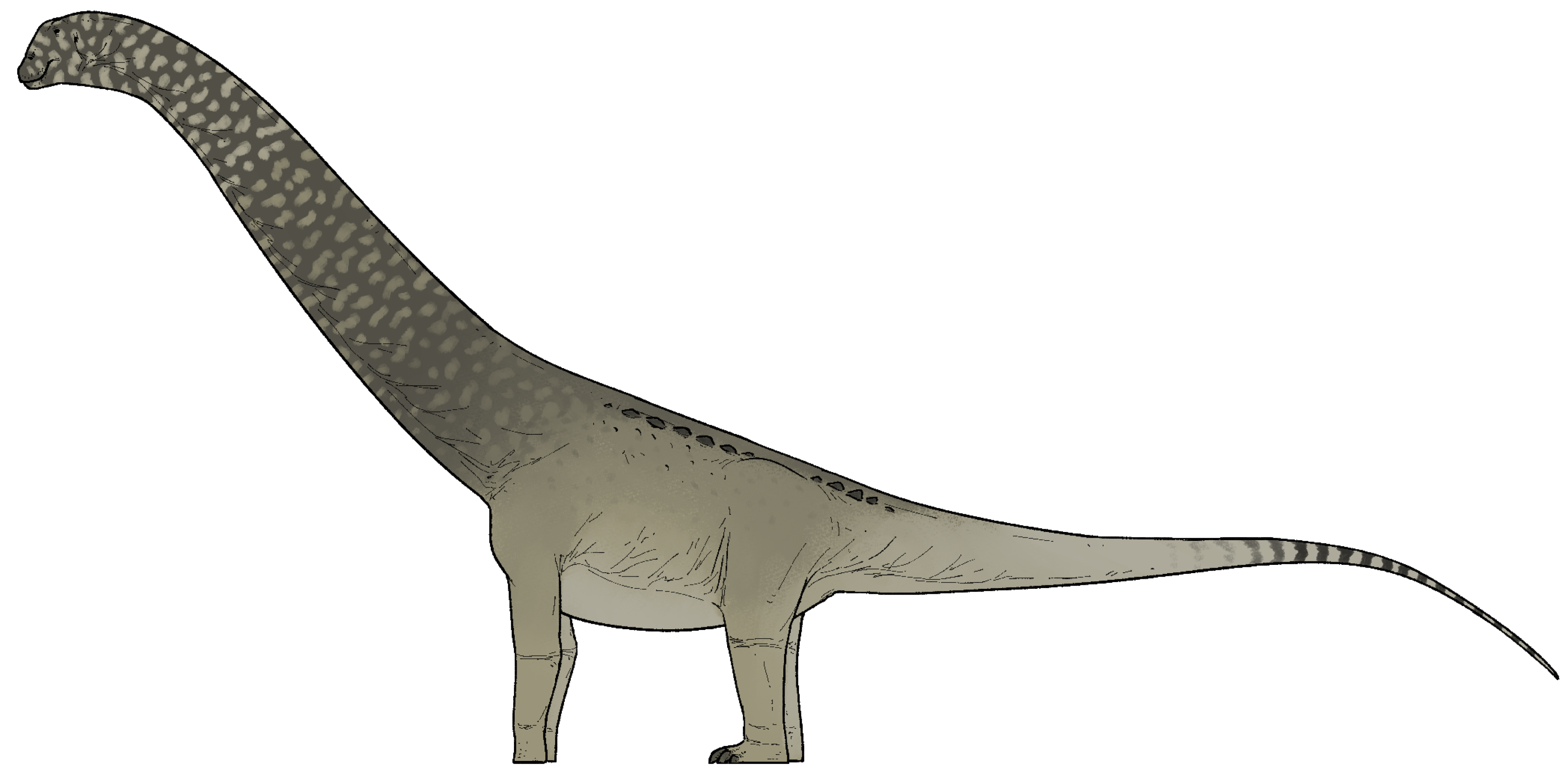
Life restoration

In their phylogenetic analyses using an updated version of the dataset of Pérez-Moreno et al. (2024), Longrich et al. (2026) recovered Phosphatotitan as the sister taxon to an unnamed Moroccan specimen from the Sidi Daoui locality. The South American Patagotitan and Argentinosaurus were recovered as successive outgroups to this African group, together forming the clade Argentinosauridae. These taxa are part of the larger clade Lognkosauria, whose only other definitive members are also South American. These results are displayed in the cladogram below:

- Titanosauria
  - Epachthosaurus
  - - - Mnyamawamtuka
      - - Malawisaurus
        - Rukwatitan
    - - Dreadnoughtus
      - Tapuiasaurus
      - - Saltasauroidea
          ⊞
          - Lirainosaurinae
          - - Alamosaurus
            - Saltasauridae
              - Opisthocoelicaudiinae
              - Saltasaurinae
          ⊟
        - Colossosauria
          - - Baurutitan
            - - Rinconsauria
              - - Overosaurus
                - - Punatitan
                  - - Trigonosaurus
                    - Aeolosaurini
          - Lognkosauria (Argentinosauria)
            - Bonitasaura
            - Chucarosaurus
            - Drusilasaura
            - Futalognkosaurus
            - Notocolossus
            - Puertasaurus
            - Quetecsaurus
            - - Mendozasaurus
              - Traukutitan
            - Argentinosauridae
              - Argentinosaurus
              - - Patagotitan
                - - Phosphatotitan
                  - Sidi Daoui titanosaur

== Palaeobiology ==
Longrich et al. (2026) suggested that the small size of Phosphatotitan in relation to other lognkosaurs may be due to either island dwarfism (in the event that Morocco was possibly separated from parts of the African continent), or conditions of environments during the latest Cretaceous, wherein smaller herbivore diversification was favored over that of giant taxa. This is seen in South America, where the most prevalent titanosaurs (e.g., saltasaurines, rinconsaurs, and aeolosaurins) are fairly small, while giant taxa are more rare. Similarly, Egyptian titanosaurs are small-bodied, though giant taxa from this region are not known.

== Palaeoecology ==
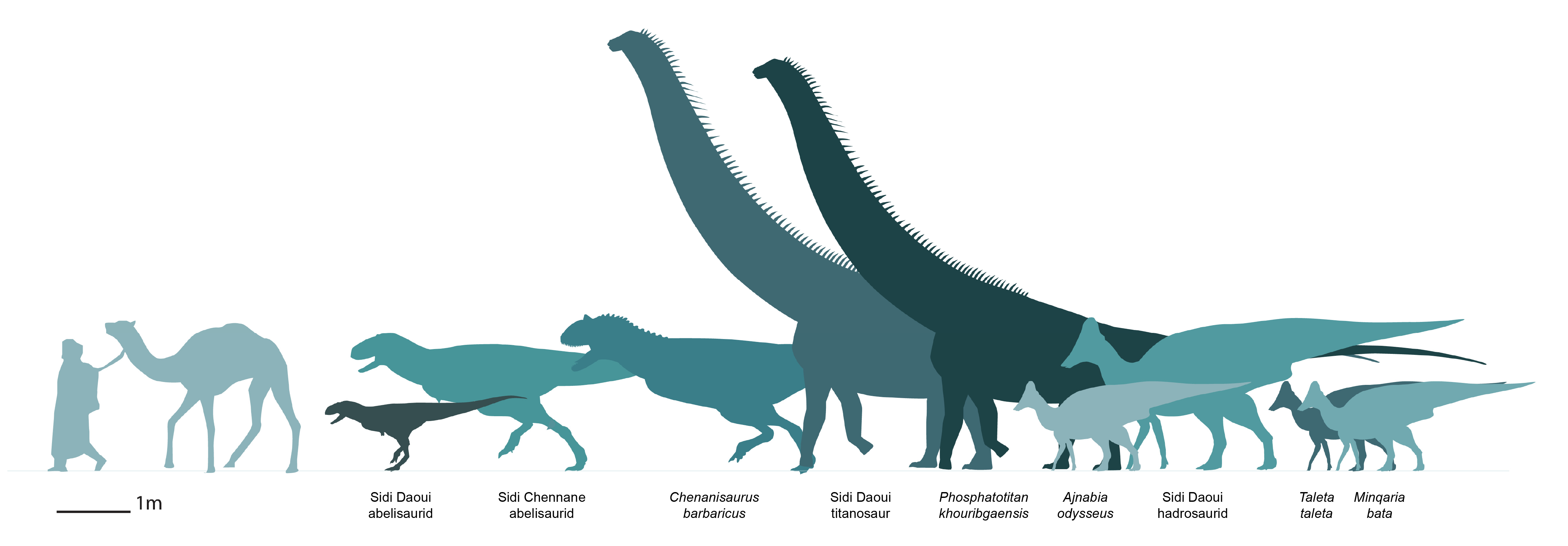
Dinosaurs from the Moroccan Maastrichtian phosphates, including Phosphatotitan and the unnamed Sidi Daoui titanosaur, center

Phosphatotitan is known from the phosphates of the Ouled Abdoun Basin of central Morocco, which dates to the late Maastrichtian age, of the late Cretaceous period, shortly before the Chicxulub asteroid impact and K-Pg boundary, the point at which the dinosaurs and many other groups went extinct. The phosphates preserve a nearshore marine environment dominated by mosasaurs, fish, and other marine animals. Dinosaurs are less common, but include diverse hadrosaurids, including Ajnabia, Minqaria, and Taleta, in addition to the abelisaurid theropod Chenanisaurus. Unnamed, fragmentary specimens belonging to both of these clades have also been described. In addition to Phosphatotitan, an additional unnamed titanosaurian is also known from the Sidi Daoui locality, preserving a partial hindlimb (femur, tibia, and fibula)).
