= Chucarosaurus =

Chucarosaurus Temporal range: Early Cretaceous (Albian), 106.2 Ma
- Skeletal diagram of Chucarosaurus

Scientific classification
- Kingdom: Animalia
- Phylum: Chordata
- Class: Reptilia
- Clade: Dinosauria
- Clade: Saurischia
- Clade: †Sauropodomorpha
- Clade: †Sauropoda
- Clade: †Macronaria
- Clade: †Titanosauria
- Clade: †Colossosauria
- Genus: †Chucarosaurus; Agnolin et al., 2023
- Species: †C. diripienda

Binomial name
- †Chucarosaurus diripienda Agnolin et al., 2023

Genus of titanosaurian dinosaurs

Chucarosaurus (meaning "indomitable reptile") is an extinct genus of titanosaurian dinosaur from the Early Cretaceous (Albian) Huincul Formation of Argentina. The genus contains a single species, C. diripienda, known from various limb and pelvic bones.

== Discovery and naming ==
The Chucarosaurus holotype specimen, MPCA PV 820, was discovered in sediments of the Huincul Formation, dated to the Albian stage of the Early Cretaceous period, at Pueblo Blanco Natural Reserve in Río Negro Province, Argentina. The specimen consists of a complete left humerus, partial left radius, complete left metacarpal II, left ischium, partial left femur and fibula, partial right tibia, and partial indeterminate metapodial, all of which belong to one individual. An additional specimen (MPCA PV 821), consisting of a left femur and tibia, was assigned as the paratype.

In 2023, Agnolin et al. described Chucarosaurus diripienda, a new genus and species of colossosaurian titanosaurs, based on these fossil remains. The generic name, "Chucarosaurus", combines "chucaro", a Quechua word meaning "hard and indomitable animal" with the Latin word "saurus", meaning "reptile". The specific name, "diripienda", is derived from a Latin word meaning "scrambled".

== Description ==
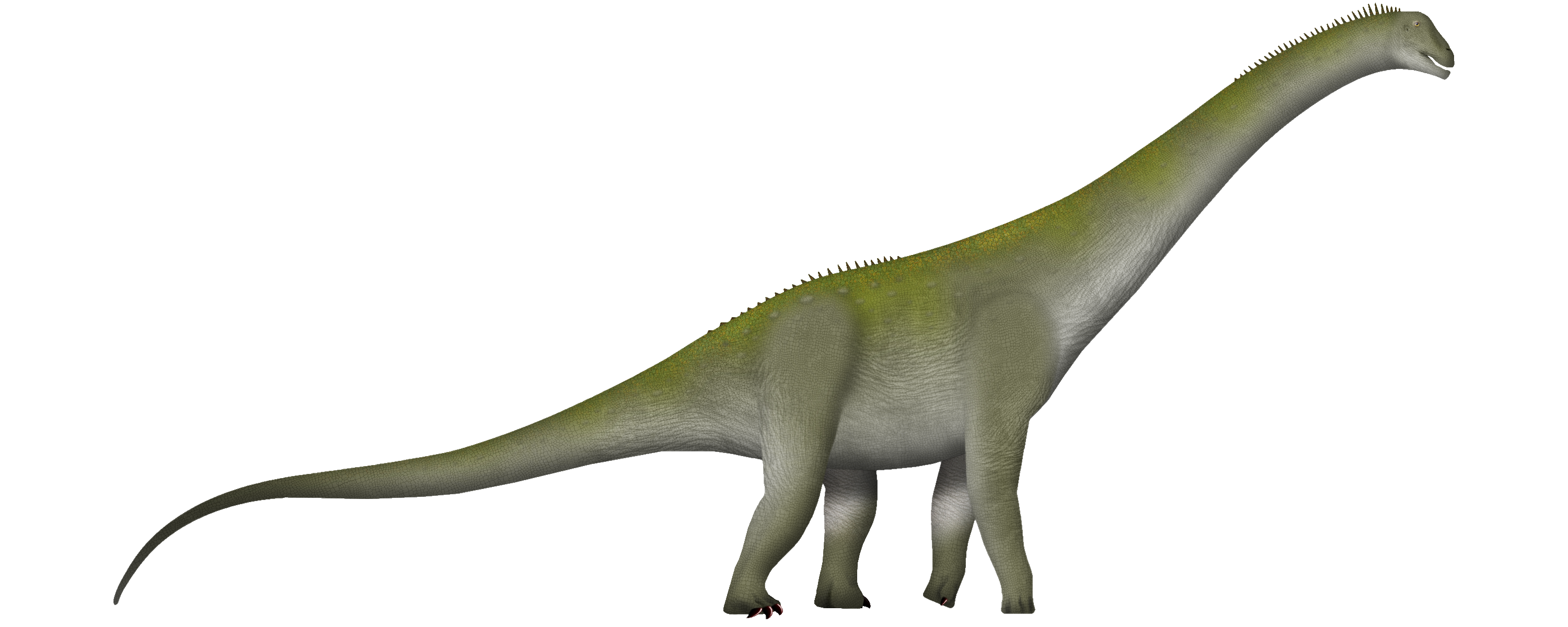
Speculative life restoration

Chucarosaurus was a large, slender-limbed titanosaur. Its femur was roughly 1.9 metres (6.2 ft) long, somewhat smaller than the estimated 2.5 metres (8.2 ft) length of the femur of Argentinosaurus. The forelimb was shorter than the hindlimb, with a humerus 78% the length of the femur, as is typical of titanosaurs but unlike some basal titanosauriforms such as brachiosaurids. As in other colossosaurs, the deltopectoral crest of the humerus was thickened in its distal half. The ischium has a shorter, more robust iliac peduncle than in other titanosaurs.

== Classification ==
Size of Chucarosaurus compared to a human

Agnolin et al. (2023) recovered Chucarosaurus as a colossosaurian member of the Titanosauria, as the sister taxon to a clade formed by Notocolossus and the Lognkosauria. The results of their phylogenetic analyses are shown in the cladogram below:

- Colossosauria
  - Rinconsauria
  - - Bonitasaura
    - - Chucarosaurus
      - - Notocolossus
        - Lognkosauria
          - Mendozasaurus
          - - - Quetecsaurus
              - Futalognkosaurus
            - - Puertasaurus
              - Drusilasaura
              - - Argentinosaurus
                - Patagotitan

== Palaeoenvironment ==
Size of several dinosaurs from the Huincul Formation compared to a human

Chucarosaurus is known from the Early Cretaceous Huincul Formation of Río Negro Province, Argentina. Many dinosaurs, including fellow titanosaurs (Argentinosaurus Bustingorrytitan, and Choconsaurus), rebbachisaurids (Cathartesaura, Cienciargentina, Limaysaurus, and Sidersaura), carcharodontosaurids (Mapusaurus, Meraxes, and Taurovenator), a megaraptoran (Aoniraptor), abelisaurids (Skorpiovenator, Tralkasaurus, and Ilokelesia), an elaphrosaurine (Huinculsaurus), a paravian (Overoraptor), and the unusual avetheropod Gualicho have also been named from the formation. Remains of unenlagiids, iguanodonts, and elasmarian ornithopods are also known.
