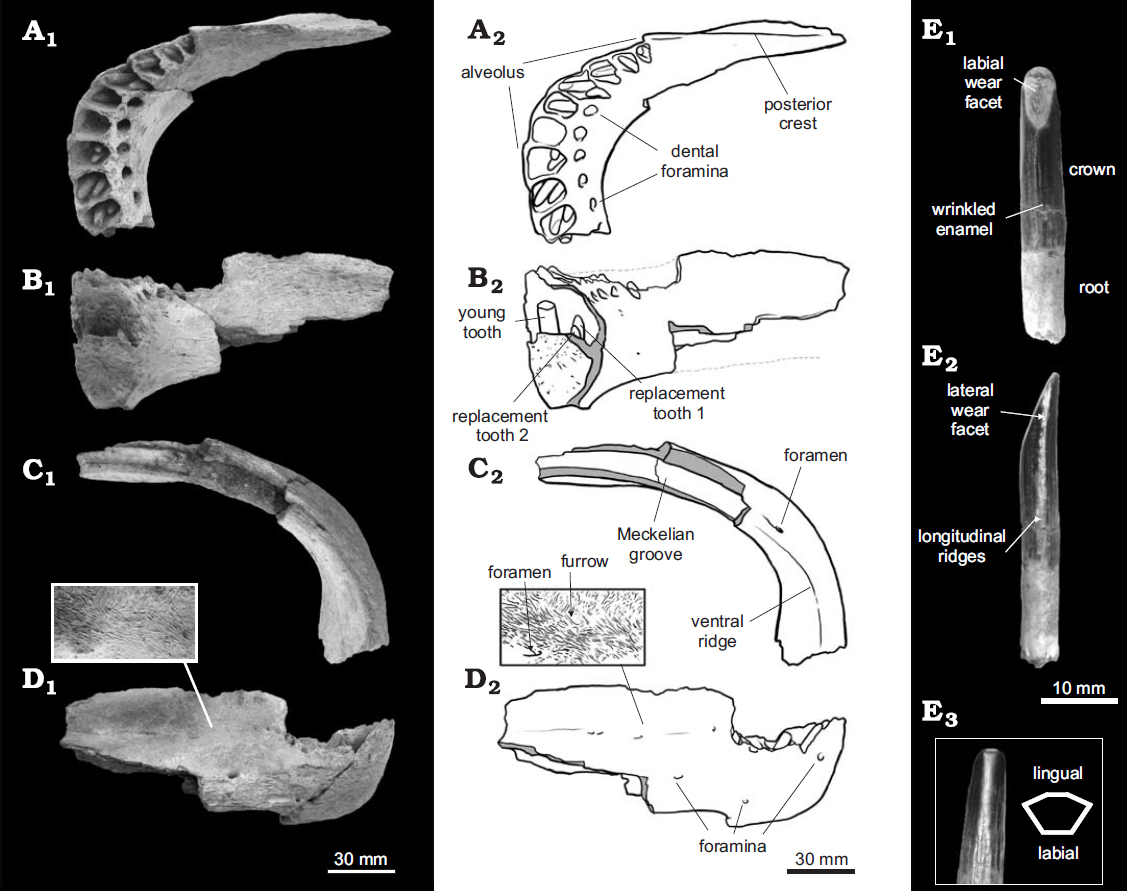
- Right dentary

Scientific classification
- Kingdom: Animalia
- Phylum: Chordata
- Class: Reptilia
- Clade: Dinosauria
- Clade: Saurischia
- Clade: †Sauropodomorpha
- Clade: †Sauropoda
- Clade: †Macronaria
- Clade: †Titanosauria
- Clade: †Colossosauria
- Genus: †Bonitasaura; Apesteguía, 2004

Type species
- †Bonitasaura salgadoi Apesteguía, 2004

= Bonitasaura =

Bonitasaura Temporal range: Late Cretaceous (Coniacian - Santonian) ~86–83 Ma

Extinct genus of dinosaurs

Bonitasaura is a genus of titanosaurian dinosaur hailing from uppermost layers of the Late Cretaceous (Santonian) Bajo de la Carpa Formation, Neuquén Group of the eastern Neuquén Basin, located in Río Negro Province, Northwestern Patagonia, Argentina. The remains, consisting of a partial sub-adult skeleton jumbled in a small area of fluvial sandstone, including a lower jaw with teeth, a partial vertebrae series, and limb bones, were described by Sebastian Apesteguía in 2004.

The genus name Bonitasaura refers to the fossil quarry's name, "La Bonita", while the name of the type species, B. salgadoi, pays homage to Leonardo Salgado, a renowned Argentine paleontologist.

== Description ==
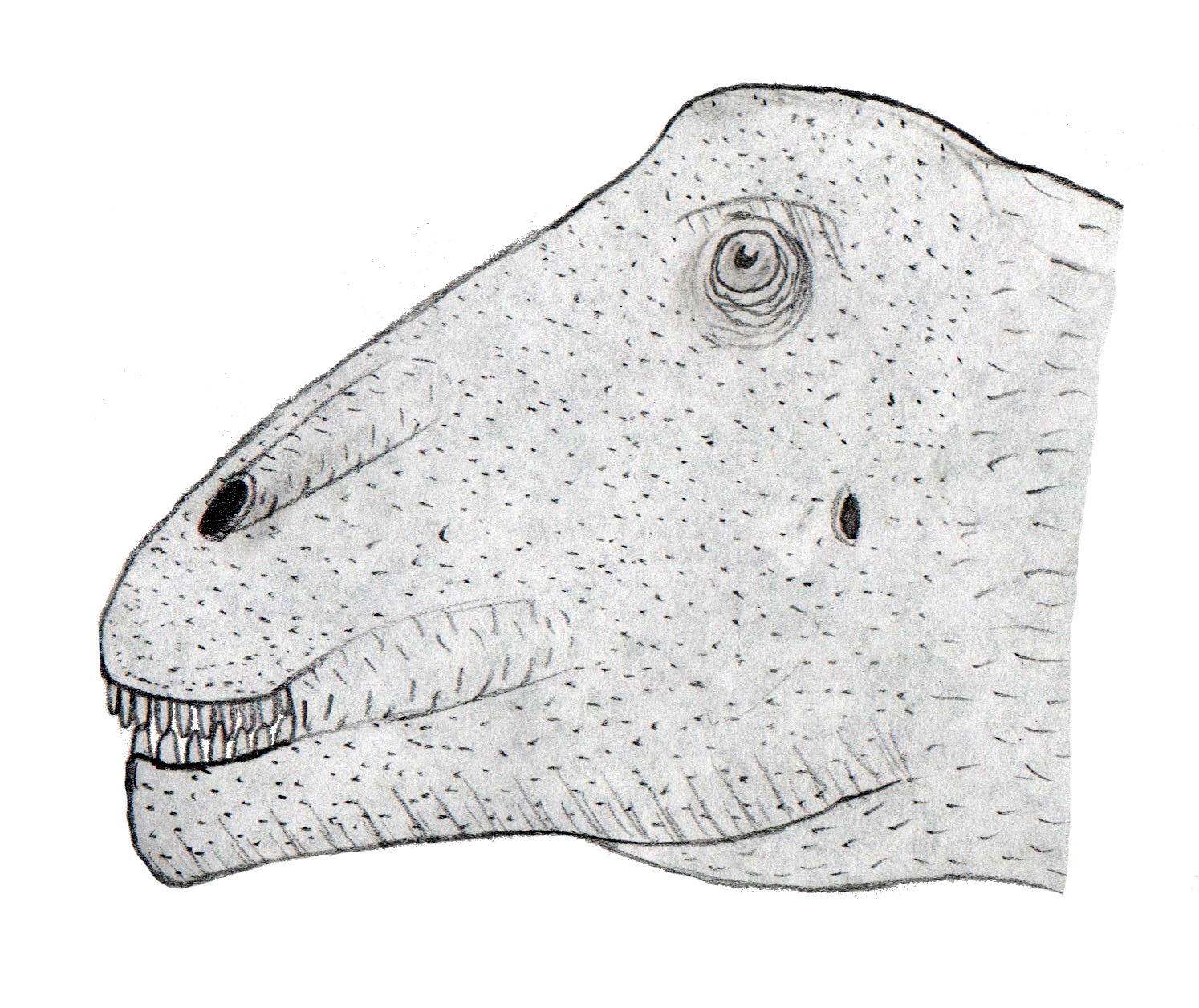
Illustration of the head

Bonitasaura measured 10 metres (33 ft) in length, and had a skull similar to another group of sauropods, the diplodocids. The lower jaw had a distinctive, sharp ridge immediately behind a reduced set of teeth. This ridge supported in life a sharp, beak-like keratin sheath that probably paired with a similar structure in the upper jaw. The keratin sheath worked much like a guillotine to crop vegetation raked into the mouth by the peg-like front teeth. This animal also had a rather short neck and robust projections of the back vertebrae for muscle attachment, indicating that the neck was used in vigorous exertions, probably during feeding.

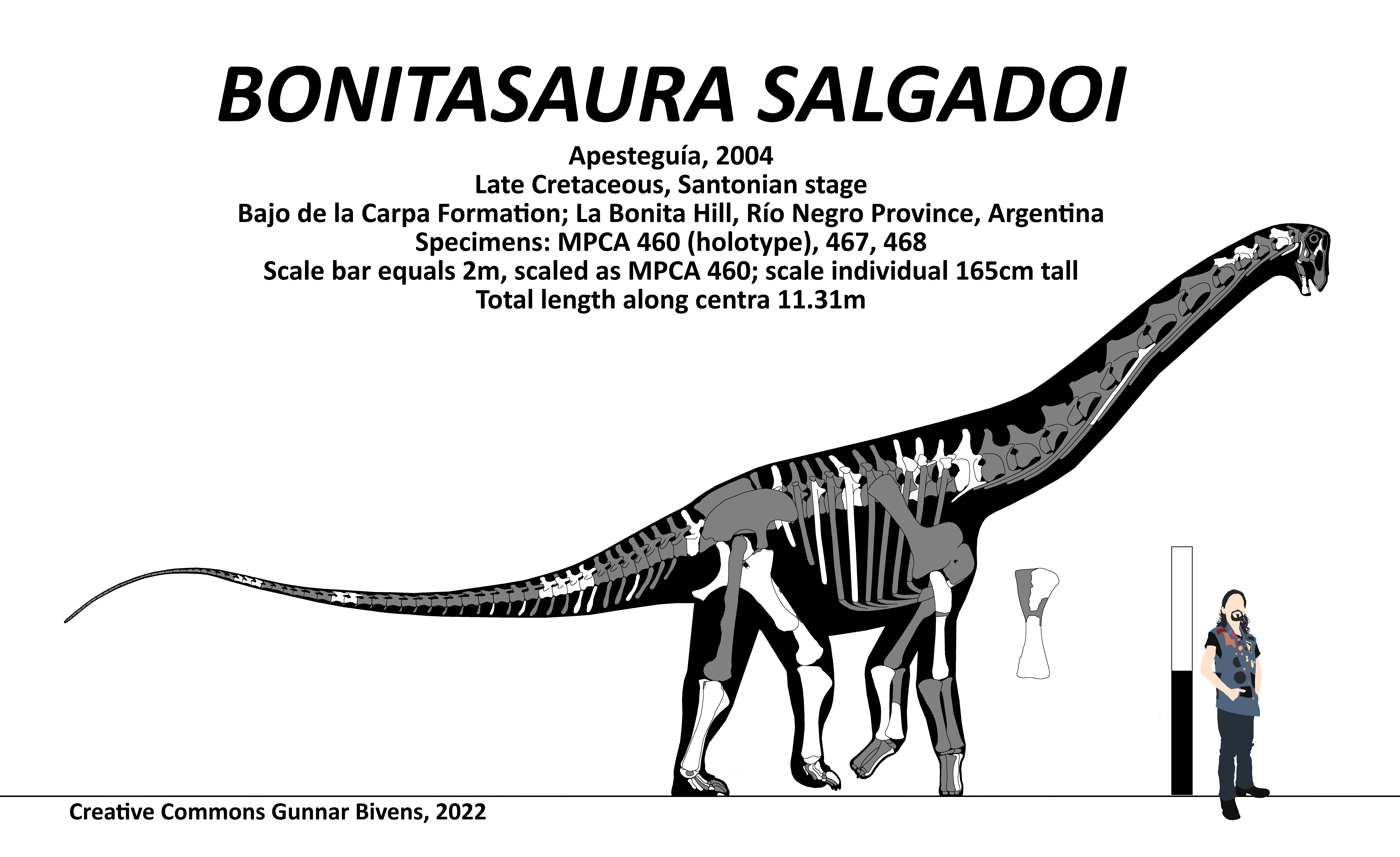
Skeletal reconstruction of B. salgadoi.

Bonitasaura also shows that some lines of titanosaurian evolution converged with diplodocids, namely low long skulls without the characteristic nasal arches of other macronarians (such as Brachiosaurus or Camarasaurus) and lower jaws that were squared off and contained comb-like teeth (as in Rebbachisauridae), reversed limb proportions (the front limbs shorter than the hind limbs, unlike the condition in most other macronarians) and rudimentary whiplash tails. It also made the suggestion that the titanosaur Antarctosaurus is a chimera made up of a titanosaurian skull and body and a diplodocoid jaw, as proposed by some authors (McIntosh 1990; Jacobs et al. 1993; Upchurch 1999) less likely.

== Palaeopathologies ==
Multiple palaeopathologies have been identified from the holotype of B. salgadoi. These include a femoral osteoblastic tumour, an enthesophyte on metatarsal III, and abnormal tissue in a caudal prezygapophysis caused by an infection.

== Classification ==
Bonitasaura was originally classified as a member of Nemegtosauridae in the original description, but subsequent cladistic analyses and description found it to be nested among the titanosaur clade that includes Lognkosauria and Rinconsauria. In the description of Chucarosaurus in 2023, Agnolin et al. recovered Bonitasaura as a colossosaurian member of the Titanosauria, as the sister taxon to a clade formed by Chucarosaurus, Notocolossus and the Lognkosauria. The results of their phylogenetic analyses are shown in the cladogram below:

- Colossosauria
  - Rinconsauria
  - - Bonitasaura
    - - Chucarosaurus
      - - Notocolossus
        - Lognkosauria
          - Mendozasaurus
          - - - Quetecsaurus
              - Futalognkosaurus
            - - Puertasaurus
              - Drusilasaura
              - - Argentinosaurus
                - Patagotitan
