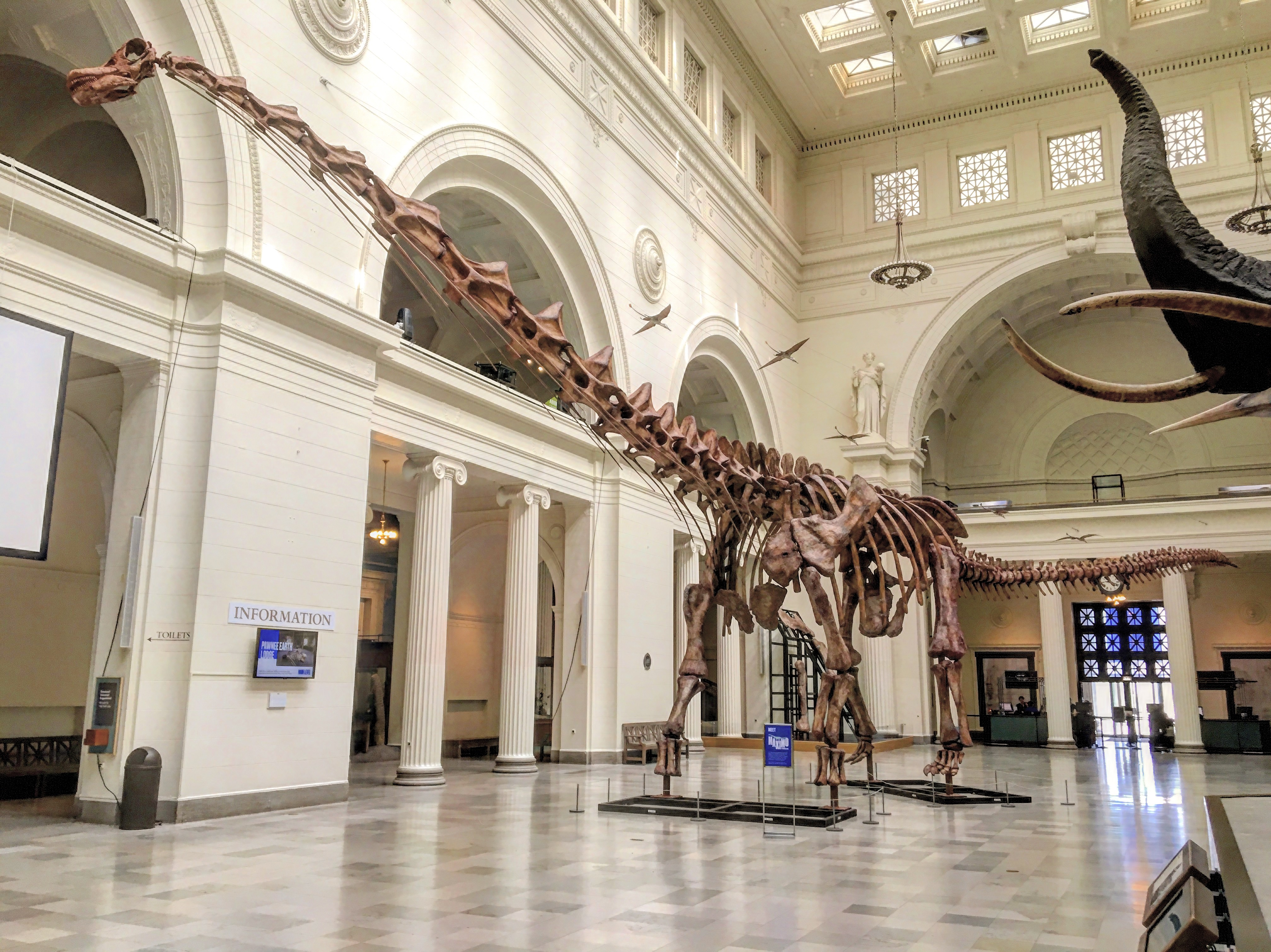
- Skeleton mount of Patagotitan mayorum

Scientific classification
- Kingdom: Animalia
- Phylum: Chordata
- Class: Reptilia
- Clade: Dinosauria
- Clade: Saurischia
- Clade: †Sauropodomorpha
- Clade: †Sauropoda
- Clade: †Macronaria
- Clade: †Titanosauria
- Clade: †Eutitanosauria
- Clade: †Colossosauria; González-Riga et al. 2019

Genera
- †Antarctosaurus; †Baalsaurus; †Bonitasaura; †Chucarosaurus; †Epachthosaurus?; †Jainosaurus; †Nullotitan; †Quetecsaurus; †Tengrisaurus?; †Vahiny; †Lognkosauria; †Rinconsauria

= Colossosauria =

Colossosaurians Temporal range: Cretaceous, 101.62–66 Ma

Extinct clade of dinosaurs

Colossosauria is a clade of titanosaur sauropods from the latest Early Cretaceous through the Late Cretaceous of South America. The group was originally named by Bernardo González-Riga et al. in 2019 and defined as the "most inclusive clade containing Mendozasaurus neguyelap but not Saltasaurus loricatus or Epachthosaurus sciuttoi". The clade contains different taxa depending on the phylogenetic analysis used, in the defining paper the only subgroups were Rinconsauria and Lognkosauria, but alternate phylogenies published previously had also included various similar titanosaurs such as Aeolosaurus, Bonitasaura, Drusilasaura, Overosaurus and Quetecsaurus. The phylogenetic analysis of González-Riga et al. (2019) placed Colossosauria as sister taxa to Epachthosaurus, Pitekunsaurus and a larger clade including Saltasauridae.

- Lithostrotia
  - Malawisaurus
  - - - - Tapuiasaurus
        - Nemegtosaurus
      - Saltasauridae
        - Aeolosaurus
        - Isisaurus
        - Rapetosaurus
        - Saltasaurus
        - - Opisthocoelicaudia
          - - Jiangshanosaurus
            - Alamosaurus
    - - Pitekunsaurus
      - - Epachthosaurus
        - Colossosauria
          - Rinconsauria
            - Muyelensaurus
            - Rinconsaurus
          - Lognkosauria
            - Mendozasaurus
            - - Futalognkosaurus
              - - Argentinosaurus
                - - Patagotitan
                  - Puertasaurus
                  - Notocolossus

Due to the labile position of Epachthosaurus in titanosaur phylogeny, Carballido and colleagues proposed a new definition for Colossosauria in 2022, as all taxa closer to Patagotitan than Saltasaurus. This solidified the position of Colossosauria as the opposite clade to Saltasauroidea within Eutitanosauria, and stabilized all three groups based on derived members instead of the more problematic basal taxa like Epachthosaurus and Mendozasaurus. While Rinconsauria and Lognkosauria were both suggested to be probable Colossosaur subgroups, the inconsistencies in titanosaur phylogenetics meant that no changes to either group were proposed, leaving Colossosauria as probably also including unclassified taxa on the stem to either more restrictive group.
