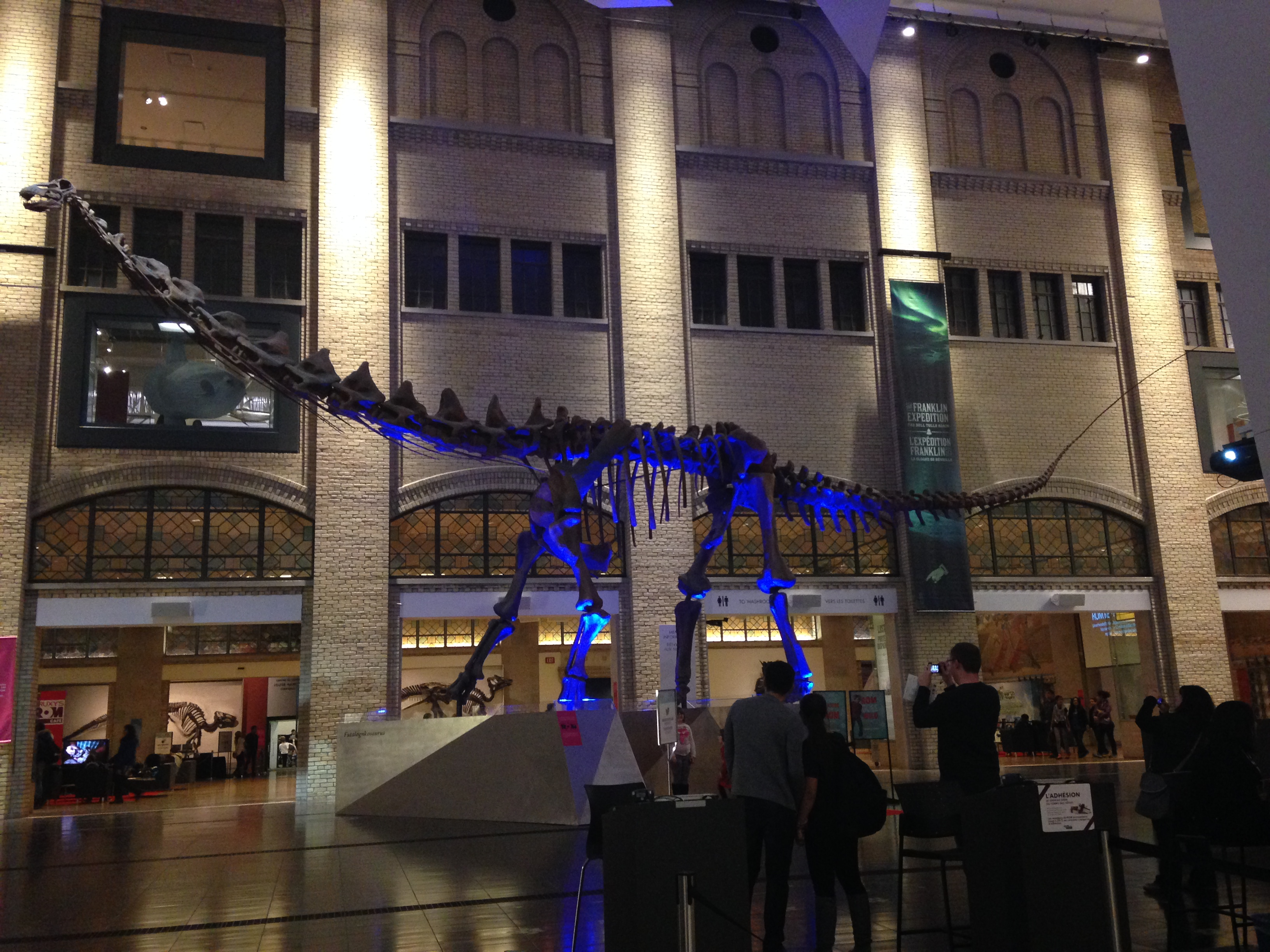
- Replica mount of Futalognkosaurus at the Royal Ontario Museum

Scientific classification
- Kingdom: Animalia
- Phylum: Chordata
- Class: Reptilia
- Clade: Dinosauria
- Clade: Saurischia
- Clade: †Sauropodomorpha
- Clade: †Sauropoda
- Clade: †Macronaria
- Clade: †Titanosauria
- Clade: †Colossosauria
- Clade: †Lognkosauria; Calvo et al. 2007

Genera
- †Drusilasaura; †Dzharatitanis?; †Futalognkosaurus; †Jiangxititan?; †Mendozasaurus; †Mongolosaurus?; †Notocolossus; †Puertasaurus; †Traukutitan?; †Argentinosauridae Longrich et al., 2026; †Argentinosaurus; †Patagotitan; †Phosphatotitan

= Lognkosauria =

Lognkosaurians Temporal range: Early-Late Cretaceous, 102–66 Ma

Clade of titanosaurian sauropods

Lognkosauria is a clade of giant long-necked sauropod dinosaurs within the clade Titanosauria. It includes some of the largest and heaviest dinosaurs known. They lived in South America, Africa, and possibly Asia during the Cretaceous period.

== Description ==
Lognkosaurians can be distinguished from other titanosaurs by the wide and unusually thick cervical rib loops on their neck vertebrae, the relatively narrow neural canal, and their huge vaulted neural arches. They also had very wide dorsal vertebrae with wing-like side processes, and extremely wide rib cages. Their dorsal side processes are also fairly in line with the level of the neural canal.

== Classification ==
Lognkosauria was defined as the clade encompassing the most recent common ancestor of Futalognkosaurus dukei and Mendozasaurus neguyelap and all its descendants. Malawisaurus may be related to this group. Lognkosauria has been found to include other giant sauropods, such as Puertasaurus, Argentinosaurus, Patagotitan, Notocolossus, Drusilasaura and Traukutitan.

- Titanosauria
  - - Dreadnoughtus
    - Lithostrotia
      - Rinconsauria
        - Rinconsaurus
        - - Muyelensaurus
          - - Aeolosaurus
            - Overosaurus
      - - Bonitasaura
        - - Notocolossus
          - Lognkosauria
            - Mendozasaurus
            - - - Futalognkosaurus
                - Quetecsaurus
              - - Puertasaurus
                - Drusilasaura
                - - Argentinosaurus
                  - Patagotitan
