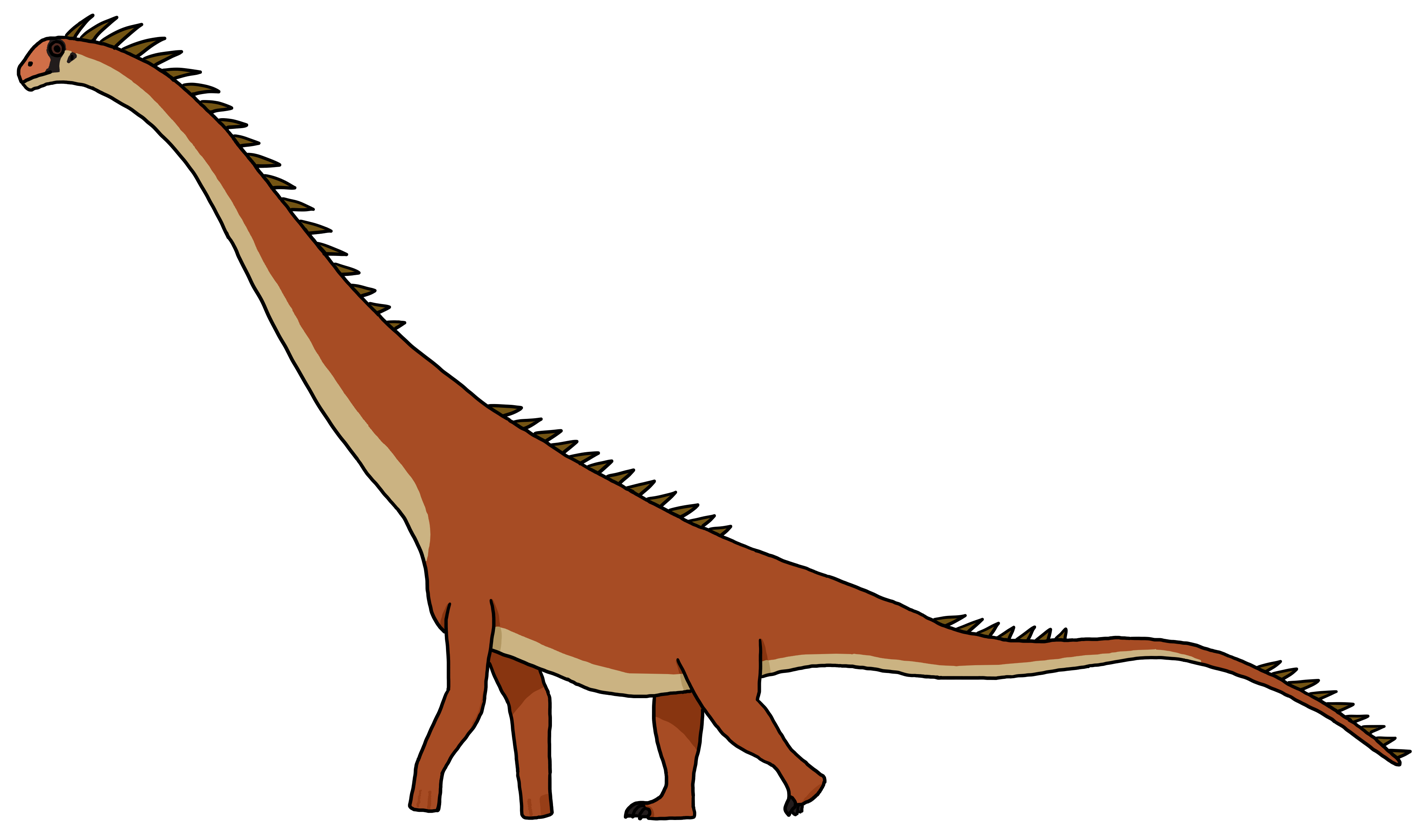
- Speculative life reconstruction

Scientific classification
- Kingdom: Animalia
- Phylum: Chordata
- Class: Reptilia
- Clade: Dinosauria
- Clade: Saurischia
- Clade: †Sauropodomorpha
- Clade: †Sauropoda
- Clade: †Macronaria
- Clade: †Titanosauria
- Clade: †Colossosauria
- Genus: †Drusilasaura; Navarrete et al. 2011
- Species: †D. deseadensis

Binomial name
- †Drusilasaura deseadensis Navarrete et al. 2011

= Drusilasaura =

Drusilasaura Temporal range: Upper Cretaceous, Cenomanian–Turonian

Extinct genus of dinosaurs

Drusilasaura is an extinct genus of possible lognkosaurian titanosaur sauropod dinosaur which lived during the late Cretaceous (Cenomanian-Turonian stage) of Santa Cruz Province of southern Patagonia, Argentina.

Drusilasaura is known from the holotype MPM-PV 2097/1 to 2097/19, a partial skeleton including four dorsal vertebrae, a sacral vertebra, six caudal vertebrae, a left scapula, dorsal rib fragments and other fragments. It was found by palaeontologist Marcelo Tejedor searching fossil mammals, in layers of the Upper Member of the Bajo Barreal Formation, on the María Aike Ranch owned by the Ortiz de Zárate family. A team from the Laboratorio de Paleontología de Vertebrados of the Universidad Nacional de la Patagonia San Juan Bosco subsequently collected the remains.

Drusilasaura was named by César Navarrete, Gabriel Casal and Rubén Martínez in 2011. The type species is Drusilasaura deseadensis. The generic name honours Drusila Ortiz de Zárate, a young female member of the family who owns the ranch where the fossil was found, also making the name end in the feminine "-saura" instead of the masculine "-saurus". The specific name refers to the Río Deseado.

Drusilasaura is a large sauropod. The length of the scapula is 143 centimetres (56 in), 30% longer than that of Mendozasaurus.

Drusilasaura was assigned to the Titanosauridae by the describers and considered a possible member of the Lognkosauria. If so, it would be the oldest known lognkosaurian.
