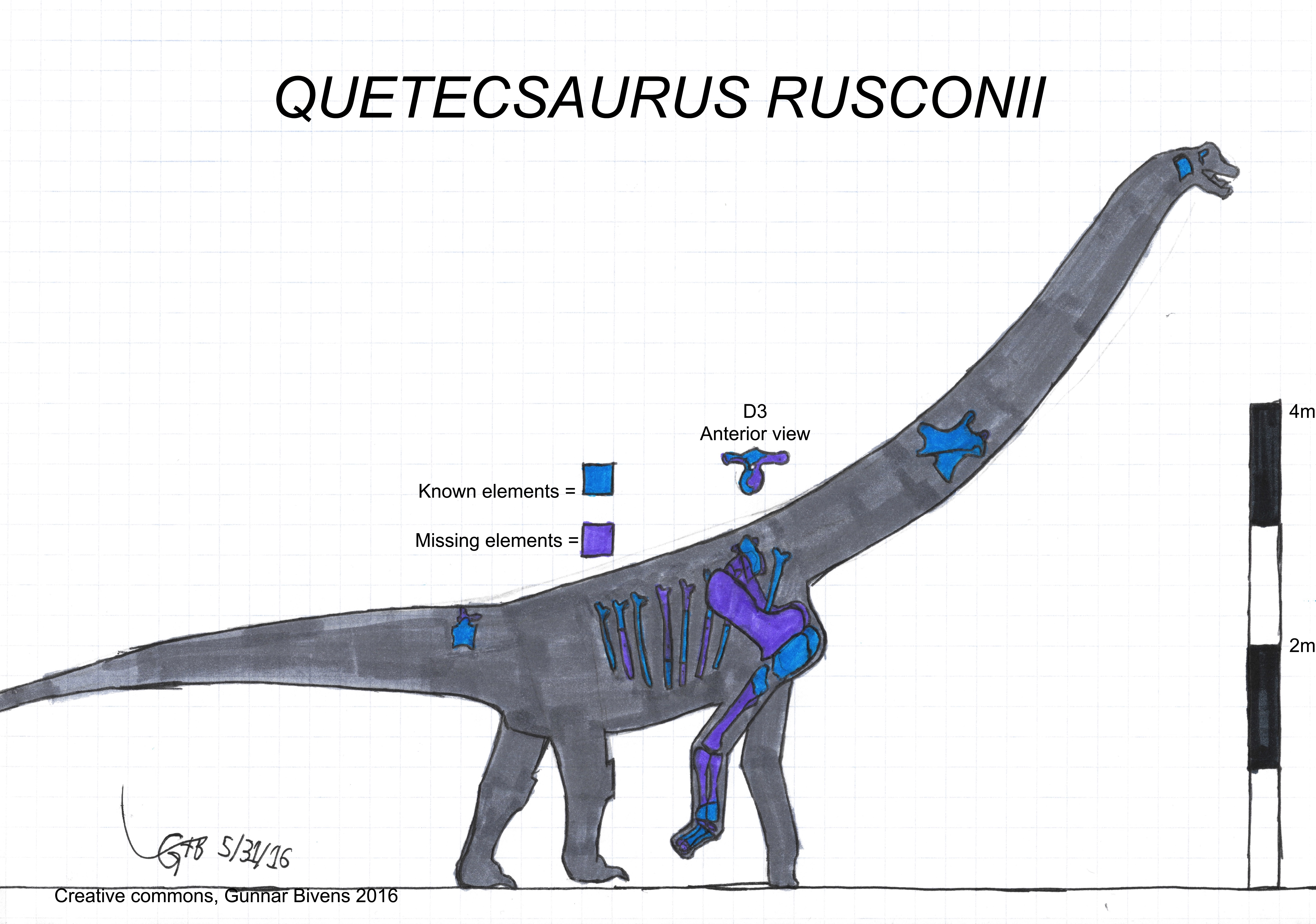
- Skeletal restoration, known material in blue

Scientific classification
- Domain: Eukaryota
- Kingdom: Animalia
- Phylum: Chordata
- Clade: Dinosauria
- Clade: Saurischia
- Clade: †Sauropodomorpha
- Clade: †Sauropoda
- Clade: †Macronaria
- Clade: †Titanosauria
- Genus: †Quetecsaurus; González Riga & Ortiz David, 2014

Type species
- †Quetecsaurus rusconii González Riga & Ortiz David, 2014

= Quetecsaurus =

Quetecsaurus Temporal range: Late Cretaceous, Turonian

Extinct genus of dinosaurs

Quetecsaurus (meaning "fire lizard", from the Milcayac word "quetec") is a genus of titanosaurian sauropod dinosaur known from the Late Cretaceous of the southern Mendoza Province, western Argentina. It contains a single species, Quetecsaurus rusconii.

== Discovery ==
Size comparison

Quetecsaurus was first described and named by Bernardo González Riga and Leonardo Ortiz David in 2014. The type species is Quetecsaurus rusconii. It is known solely from the holotype, a partial skeleton found in close association that includes a postorbital, teeth, the atlas, a rear cervical vertebra, an incomplete dorsal vertebra, a rear caudal centrum, dorsal ribs, a coracoid, five metacarpals and fragments of a humerus, radius and ulna. The holotype was collected from red mudstones of the Cerro Lisandro Formation, Neuquén Basin, dating to the middle or late Turonian stage of the Late Cretaceous. The specimen represents the first sauropod with well preserved materials from this formation.

== Description ==
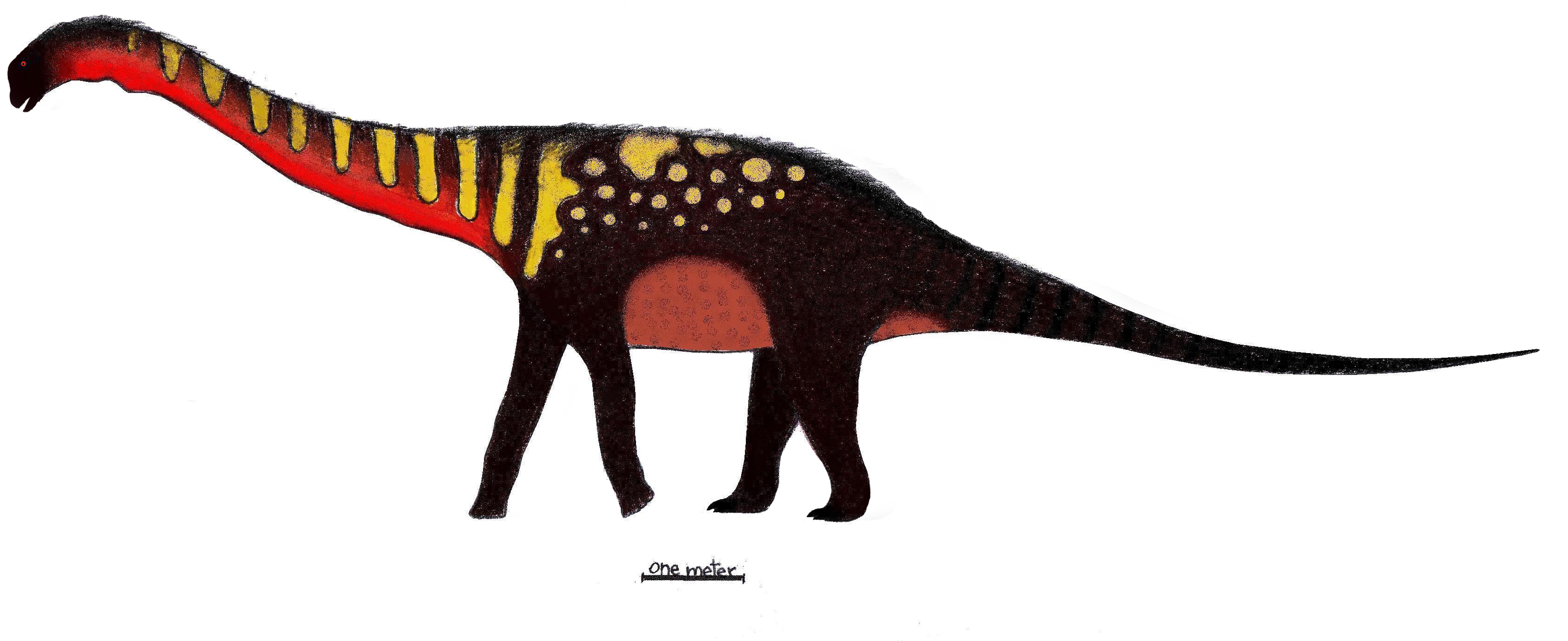
Life restoration

Quetecsaurus was diagnosed based on three autapomorphies, i.e. unique traits, by its describers. The intercentrum of its atlas shows a prominent anteroventral border and enlarged posteroventral processes. Its humerus is uniquely shaped, with strongly sigmoid (S-shaped) proximal border, rounded proximomedial border, and angular proximolateral corner. Like lognkosaur titanosaurs, it possess lateral expansions on the neural spines of its rear cervical vertebra, however they are incipient and relatively reduced.

== Phylogeny ==
Quetecsaurus was assigned to the Titanosauria, and considered to be most closely related to Mendozasaurus and Futalognkosaurus, members of Lognkosauria, based on the presence of these lateral laminae on its neural spines. A preliminary phylogenetic analysis supported this assignment, placing Quetecsaurus as a sister taxon of the clade formed by Mendozasaurus and Futalognkosaurus.
