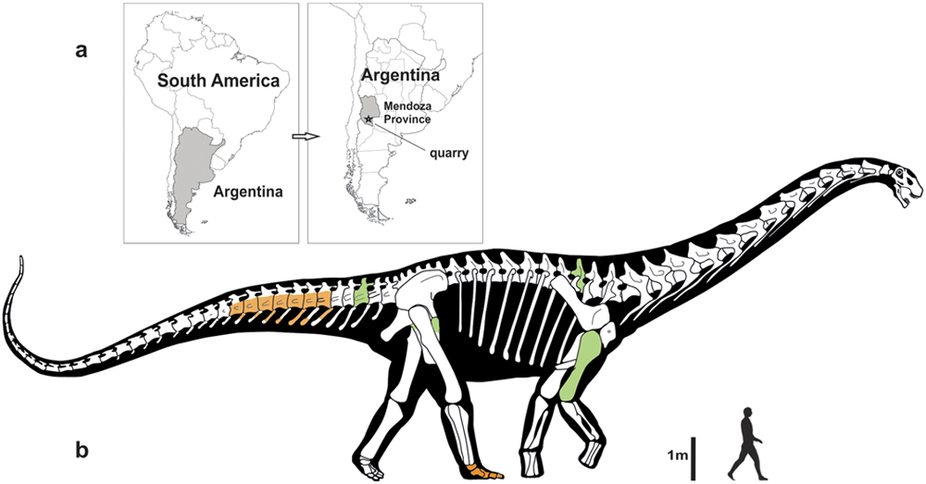
- Skeletal restoration

Scientific classification
- Kingdom: Animalia
- Phylum: Chordata
- Clade: Dinosauria
- Clade: Saurischia
- Clade: †Sauropodomorpha
- Clade: †Sauropoda
- Clade: †Macronaria
- Clade: †Titanosauria
- Genus: †Notocolossus; González Riga et al., 2016
- Species: †N. gonzalezparejasi

Binomial name
- †Notocolossus gonzalezparejasi González Riga et al., 2016

= Notocolossus =

Notocolossus Temporal range: Late Cretaceous, 86 Ma

Extinct genus of dinosaurs

Notocolossus is a genus of titanosaurian sauropod dinosaur from late Cretaceous strata of Mendoza Province, Argentina.

== Discovery and naming ==
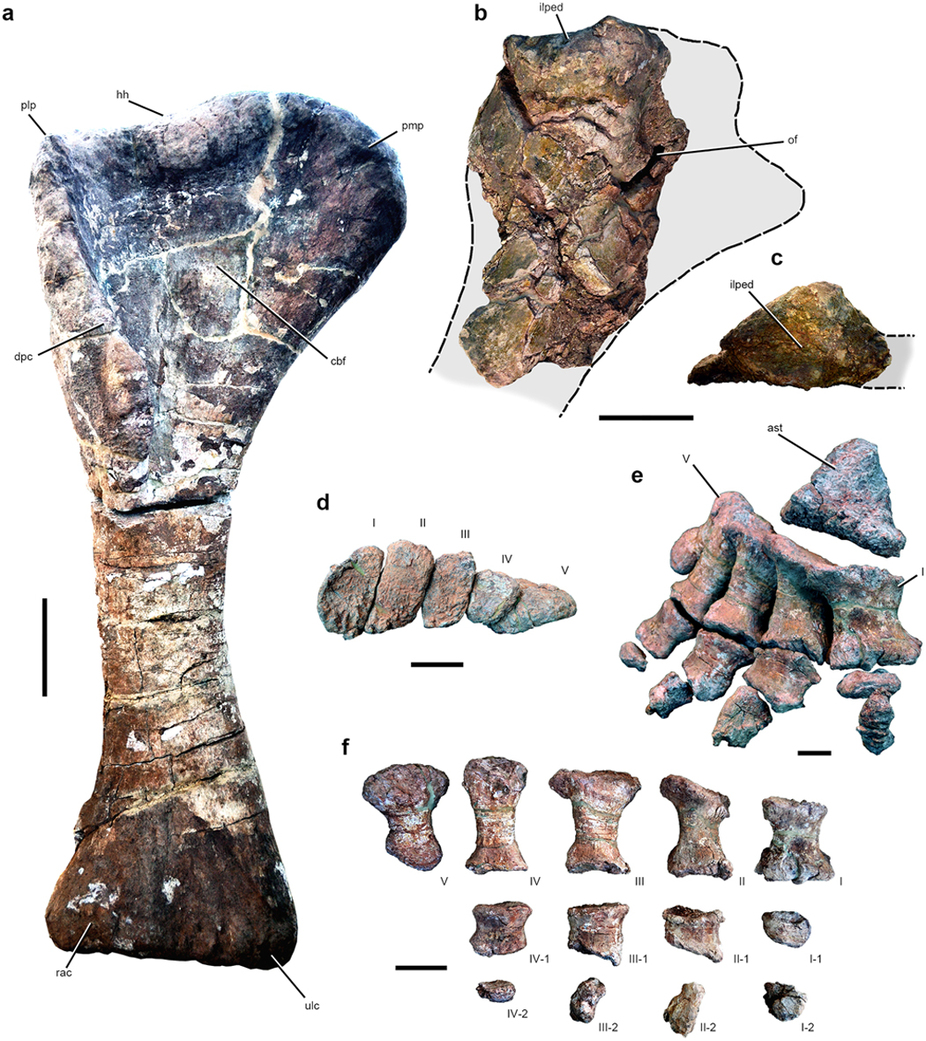
Limb bones

A fossil of a large sauropod was discovered by the Argentine paleontologist Dr. Bernardo Javier González Riga in Mendoza province.

In 2016, the type species Notocolossus gonzalezparejasi was named and described by Bernardo Javier González Riga, Matthew Carl Lamanna, Leonardo Daniel Ortiz David, Jorge Orlando Calvo and Juan P. Coria. The generic name combines the Greek words νότος, notos, "south wind", and κολοσσός, kolossos, "giant statue", in reference to the provenance from the Southern Hemisphere and the gigantic size of the animal. The specific name honours Jorge González Parejas, for having studied the dinosaur fossils of Mendoza province for two decades.

The holotype, UNCUYO-LD 301, was found in a layer of the Plottier Formation dating from the Coniacian-Santonian, about eighty-six million years old. It consists of a partial skeleton lacking the skull. It contains an anterior back vertebra, an anterior tail vertebra, a right humerus and the upper part of a left pubic bone. Although the bones have not been discovered in articulation, they were considered to represent a single individual because they were found in close association on a surface of eight by eight metres. A second partial skeleton lacking the skull was referred to Notocolossus: specimen UNCUYO-LD 302 representing a smaller individual. It contains a series of five anterior tail vertebrae and a complete right foot connected to an astragalus. It was recovered on a distance of 403 metres to the holotype from a surface of five by five metres.

== Description ==
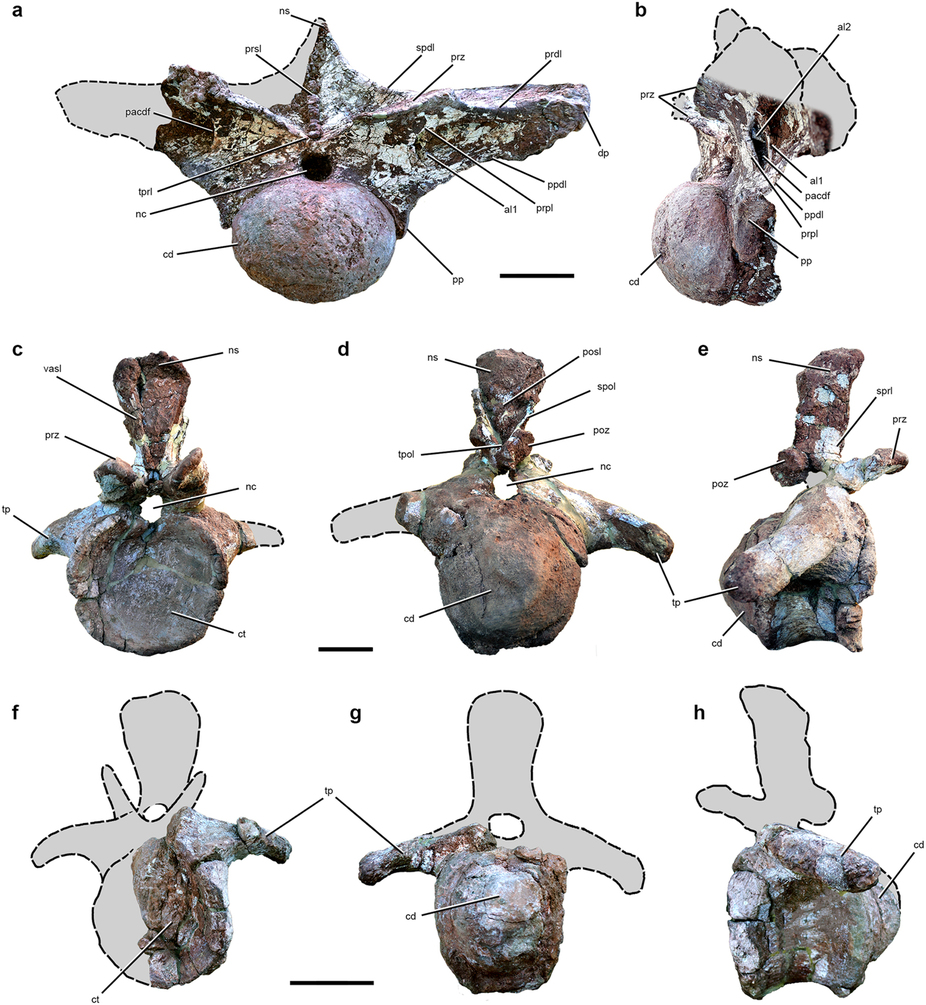
Vertebral bones

The evidence suggests that Notocolossus was among the largest titanosaurs, and therefore one of the heaviest land animals, yet discovered. Although the incompleteness of the skeleton of the new sauropod has prevented scientists from making precise estimates of its size, its humerus, or upper arm bone, is 1.76 m (5 ft 9 in) in length, which is longer than that of any other titanosaur for which this bone is known, including other giants such as Dreadnoughtus, Futalognkosaurus, and Paralititan. It held the record for the largest humerus preserved for any Cretaceous sauropod until the description of Nagatitan in 2026 with its 1.78 m (5 ft 10 in) humerus. They also estimated the total femur length at 2.166 m (7 ft 1.3 in), by using an allometric equation. If, as is likely, the body proportions of Notocolossus were comparable to those of better preserved titanosaurs, the new dinosaur may have weighed in the range of 44.9–75.9 tonnes (44.2–74.7 long tons; 49.5–83.7 short tons), most likely 60.4 tonnes (59.4 long tons; 66.6 short tons). In 2019 Gregory S. Paul estimated the mass of Notocolossus in the 45-55 tonne (49.6-60.6 short tons) range with the possibility that it might have been larger than that or approaching the mass of Argentinosaurus, which was estimated at 65-75 tonnes (71.6-82.7 short tons). This claim though, is considered unlikely. In 2020 Molina-Perez and Larramendi estimated its length at 28 m (92 ft) and its weight at 40 tonnes (44 short tons).

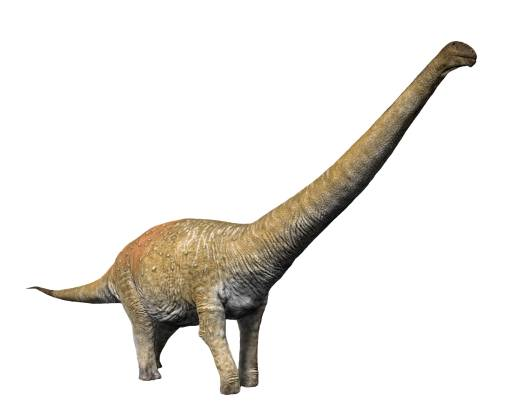
Reconstruction of Notocolossus gonzalesparejasi

In 2016, several distinguishing traits of Notocolossus were determined. Nine of these were autapomorphies, unique derived qualities. At the anterior back vertebra, the depression between the front edge of the side process and the lower edge of the side process is divided by two accessory ridges, one of which runs vertically while the other crosses the first horizontally. On the front side of the neural spines of the front tail vertebrae, run vertical ridges fusing at their lower ends, above the level of the front joint processes, creating a V-shaped structure. The upper inner corner of the humerus is strongly expanded, extending far beyond the inner side of the shaft. The humerus has in general a strongly expanded upper edge, 2.9 wider than the shaft diameter. On the humerus shaft, below the scar for the musculus coracobrachialis, runs a diagonal ridge, from the upper and outer side to the inner and lower side. The first metatarsal has an upper width exceeding its length. The third metatarsal is relatively short with 1.2 times the length of the first metatarsal. The upper toe phalanges are 50% wider at their tops than their respective metatarsals are long. The toe claws are reduced, rough and truncated.

The foot or pes of Notocolossus, a skeleton part that is not often preserved in sauropods, shows a unique build. It contains a compact, homogeneous metatarsus, thought to be adapted for bearing extraordinary weight. It also presents truncated unguals, characteristics otherwise unknown in the Sauropoda. This parallels the vertical position of the metacarpals and the finger reduction in the hand of other titanosaurs.

== Phylogeny ==
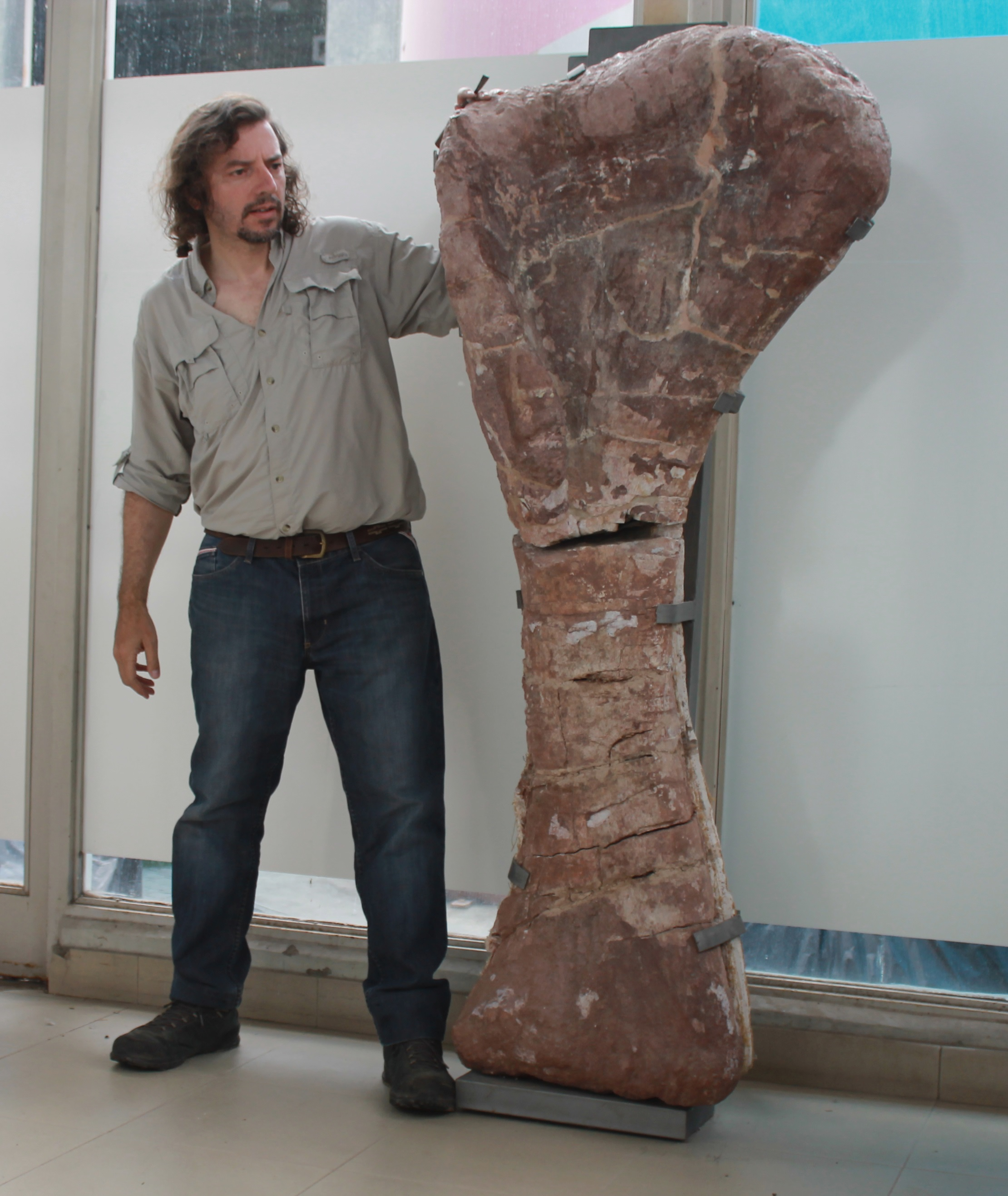
The paleontologist Bernardo González Riga with the humerus.

Notocolossus belongs to the clade Titanosauria, a very diverse group of sauropods. In 2016, a cladistic analysis recovered Notocolossus as a basal member of Lithostrotia and a sister species of Dreadnoughtus. A 2017 study by Carballido and colleagues recovered it as the sister taxon of Lognkosauria and found it to be outside of Lithostrotia. In 2018, González Riga and colleagues found it to belong to Lognkosauria, in a polytomy with Patagotitan and Puertasaurus. This analysis also found Longkosauria to belong to Lithostrotia.

The following cladogram shows the position of Notocolossus in Lognkosauria according to Gonzalez Riga and colleagues, 2018.

- Lognkosauria
  - Mendozasaurus
  - - Futalognkosaurus
    - - Argentinosaurus
      - - Notocolossus
        - Patagotitan
        - Puertasaurus

== Paleoecology ==
Notocolossus was discovered in the Plottier Formation of the Neuquén Group. This formation is about 25 metres (82 ft) thick and composed of light red claystones and thin bands of pink sandstone. The Plottier Formation can be differentiated from the overlying Portezuelo Formation by the former's higher content of argillite. Tetrapods of the Plottier formation are poorly known. They are represented by mammals, a large coelurosaur, and several titanosaurs. These titanosaurs, in addition to Notocolossus, include Petrobrasaurus, "Antarctosaurus" and a specimen that appears to be an oldest member of the group Aeolosaurini. Muyelensaurus is also discovered in this formation, although it was originally assigned to the Portezuelo Formation.

== See also ==
- 2016 in paleontology
