= Mendozasaurus =

Mendozasaurus Temporal range: Coniacian ~89–86 Ma

Scientific classification
- Kingdom: Animalia
- Phylum: Chordata
- Class: Reptilia
- Clade: Dinosauria
- Clade: Saurischia
- Clade: †Sauropodomorpha
- Clade: †Sauropoda
- Clade: †Macronaria
- Clade: †Titanosauria
- Genus: †Mendozasaurus; González Riga 2003
- Species: †M. neguyelap

Binomial name
- †Mendozasaurus neguyelap González Riga 2003

Extinct genus of dinosaurs

Mendozasaurus is a genus of titanosaurian sauropod dinosaur. It was a member of Titanosauria, which were massive sauropods that were common on the southern landmasses during the Cretaceous. It is represented by several partial skeletons from a single locality within the Coniacian (lower Upper Cretaceous) Sierra Barrosa Formation in the south of Mendoza Province, northern Neuquén Basin, Argentina. The type species, Mendozasaurus neguyelap, was described by Argentine paleontologist Bernardo Javier González Riga in 2003. Mendozasaurus is the first dinosaur named from Mendoza Province, Argentina, for which it was named.

== Description ==
Size comparison of two specimens

This species belonged to the discovered clade Lognkosauria, a transitional group of titanosaurs which included the gigantic Futalognkosaurus and Puertasaurus. Like both of these animals, Mendozasaurus had a long neck with very wide cervical neural spines. Holtz estimated its length at 22 m (72 ft). In 2010 Gregory S. Paul estimated Mendozasaurus at 20 meters (65.6 feet) in length and 16 tonnes (17.6 short tons) in weight.

== Classification ==
A phylogenetic analysis conducted by González Riga and colleagues in 2018 recovered Mendozasaurus as the most basal member of Lognkosauria, including Futalognkosaurus and the gigantic titanosaurs Argentinosaurus, Notocolossus, Patagotitan and Puertasaurus.

The following cladograms show the position of Mendozasaurus in Lognkosauria.

According to González Riga et al., 2018:

- Lognkosauria
  - Mendozasaurus
  - - Futalognkosaurus
    - - Argentinosaurus
      - - Notocolossus
        - Patagotitan
        - Puertasaurus

According to Navarro et al., 2022:

- Lognkosauria
  - BIBE 45854 (cf. Alamosaurus)
  - Futalognkosaurus
  - - Austroposeidon
    - Mendozasaurus
