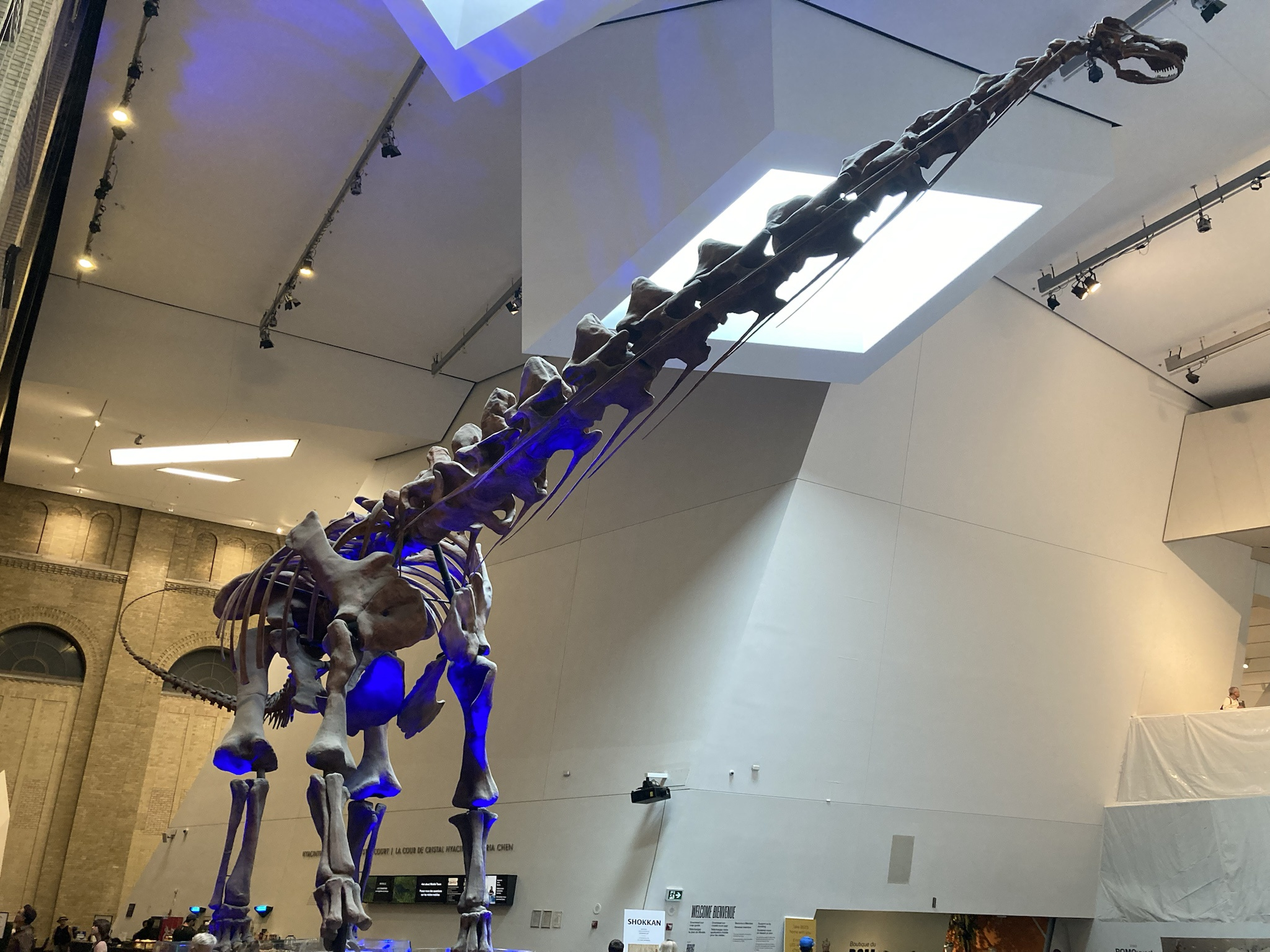
- Mounted replica skeleton, Royal Ontario Museum

Scientific classification
- Kingdom: Animalia
- Phylum: Chordata
- Clade: Dinosauria
- Clade: Saurischia
- Clade: †Sauropodomorpha
- Clade: †Sauropoda
- Clade: †Macronaria
- Clade: †Titanosauria
- Clade: †Lognkosauria
- Genus: †Futalognkosaurus; Calvo et al., 2007

Type species
- †Futalognkosaurus dukei Calvo et al., 2007

= Futalognkosaurus =

Futalognkosaurus Temporal range: Late Cretaceous, 93.5–85.8 Ma

Extinct genus of dinosaurs

Futalognkosaurus (/ˌfuːtəˌlɒŋkoʊˈsɔːrəs/ FOO-tə-long-ko-SAW-rəs; meaning "giant chief lizard") is a genus of titanosaurian dinosaur. The herbivorous Futalognkosaurus lived approximately 93.5 to 85.8 million years ago in the Portezuelo Formation, in what is now Argentina, of the Coniacian stage of the late Cretaceous Period. The fish and fossilized leaf debris on the site, together with other dinosaur remains, suggest a warm tropical climate in Patagonia during this period.

== Discovery ==
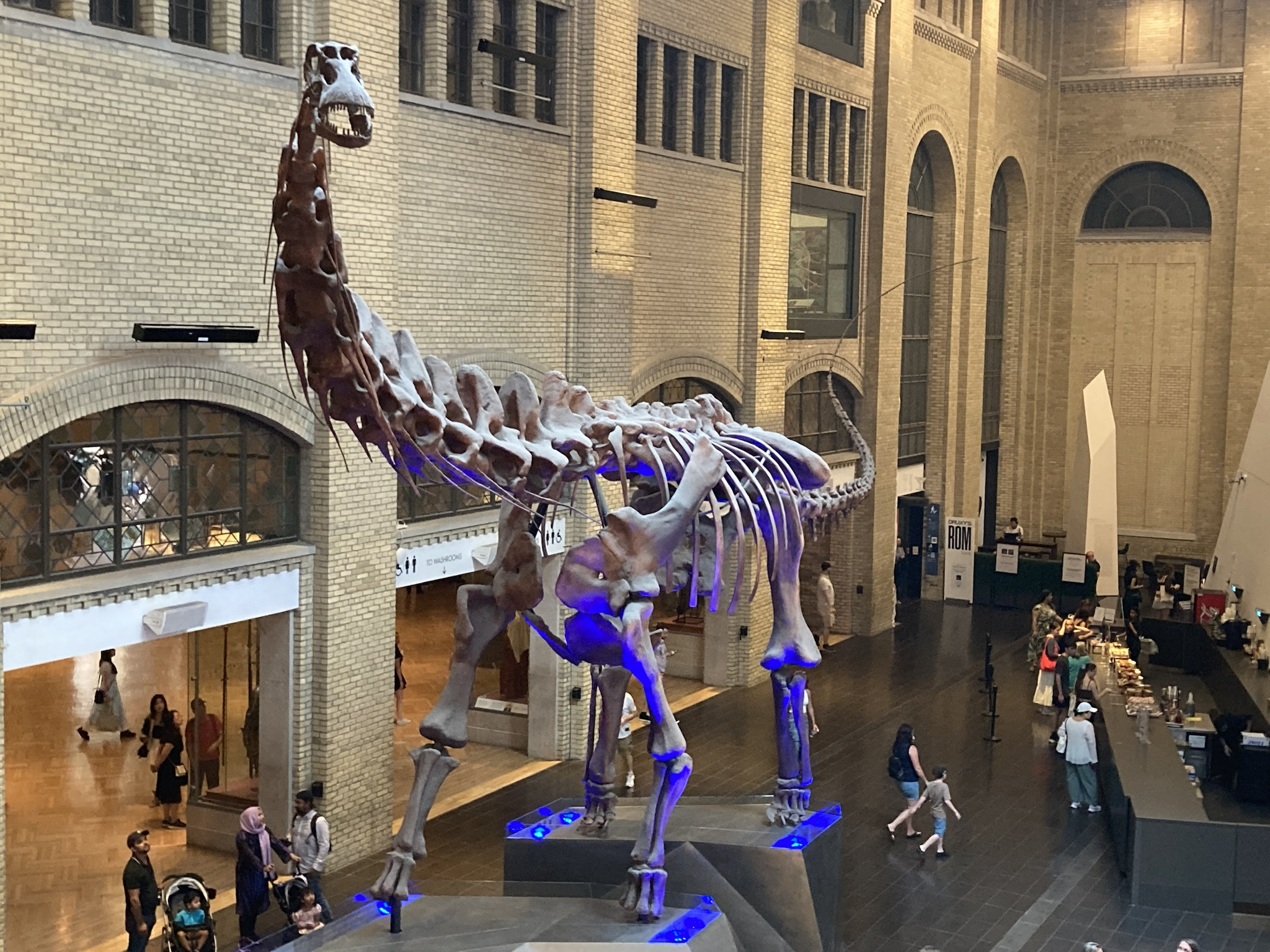
Mount at Royal Ontario Museum

Fossils of Futalognkosaurus were found in the Neuquén province of Argentina in 2000, and were scientifically described in 2007, alongside sauropods, Megaraptor, Unenlagia, iguanodonts, peirosaurids, and pterosaurs. The holotype was found near the margins of a river. The holotype was hypothesised to have been washed into the river after its death. Due to its giant size the carcass likely acted as a barrier, altering the course of the river around it, lasting long enough for fish and bivalves to live in it, and eventually leaving an oxbow lake behind.

The genus name is derived from the local indigenous language Mapudungun and is pronounced foo-ta-logn-koh-sohr-us: "futa" means "giant" and "lognko" means "chief". It is based on three fossil specimens, yielding an estimated 70% of the skeleton in total. The fossil team described the find as "the most complete giant dinosaur known so far".

== Description ==
The holotype of the type species, Futalognkosaurus dukei, was originally estimated at 32 to 34 metres (105 to 112 ft) in length. In 2008 this was downsized to 26 metres (85 ft). In 2012 Holtz estimated it at 28 metres (92 ft) long and with an approximate weight of 43.5 to 51 tonnes (48-56 short tons). An estimate by Gregory S. Paul in 2016 was that Futalognkosaurus had a maximum length of 30 metres (98 ft) and a weight of 50+ tonnes (55 short tons). In 2016, using equations that estimate body mass based on the circumference of the humerus and femur of quadrupedal animals, it was given an estimated weight of 38.1 tonnes (42 short tons). In 2019, Paul estimated the weight of the holotype specimen, (MUCPv-323) at 29 tonnes (32 short tons), and later, in 2020, Molina-Pérez and Larramendi estimated its length at 24 metres (79 ft), and its weight at 30 tonnes (33 short tons). In 2024, Paul estimated its length at 24 metres (79 ft), and its weight at 29.5 tonnes (32.5 short tons).

Its long neck contained 14 vertebrae, and was over a meter deep in places due to its extremely tall neural spines which had a distinctive "shark-fin" shape. The hips were also extremely large and bulky, reaching a width of nearly 3 metres (9.8 ft).

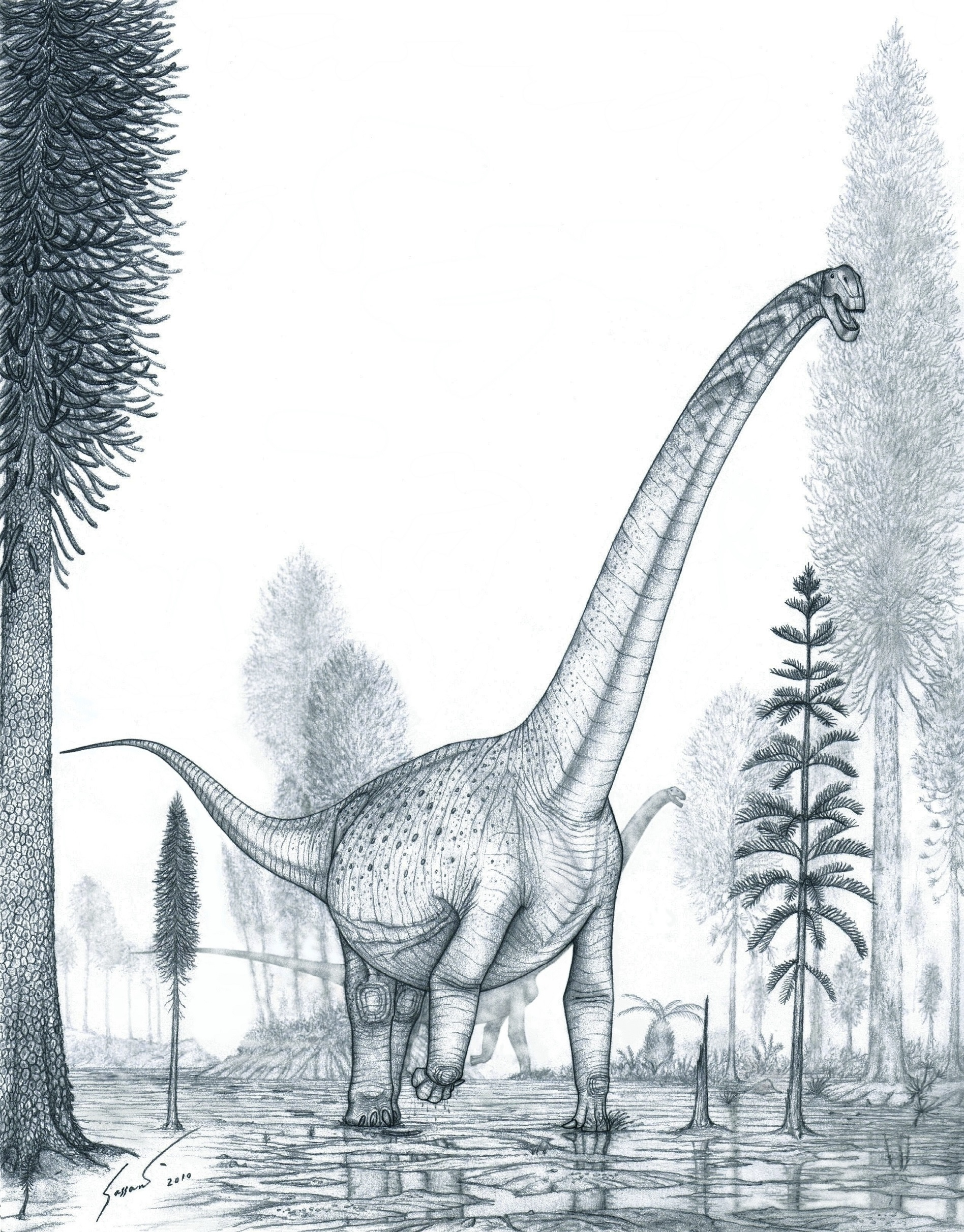
Restoration

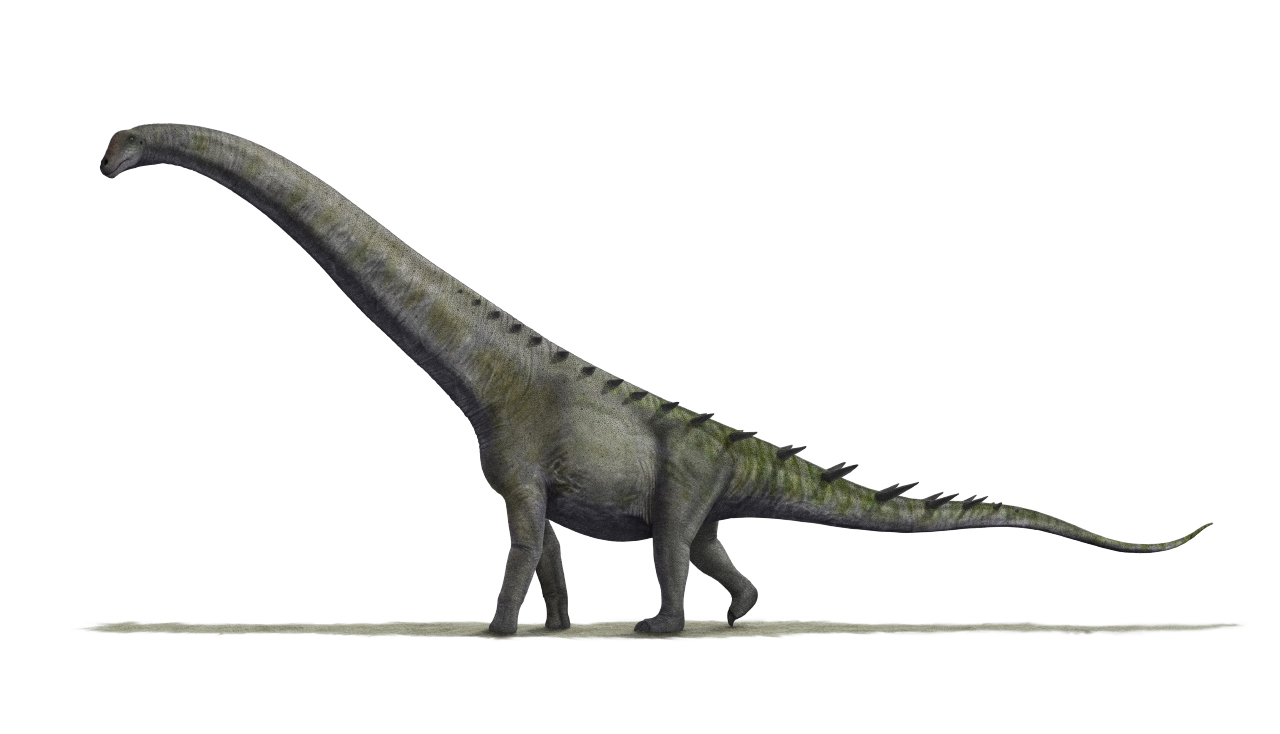
Restoration

Size comparison

== Classification ==
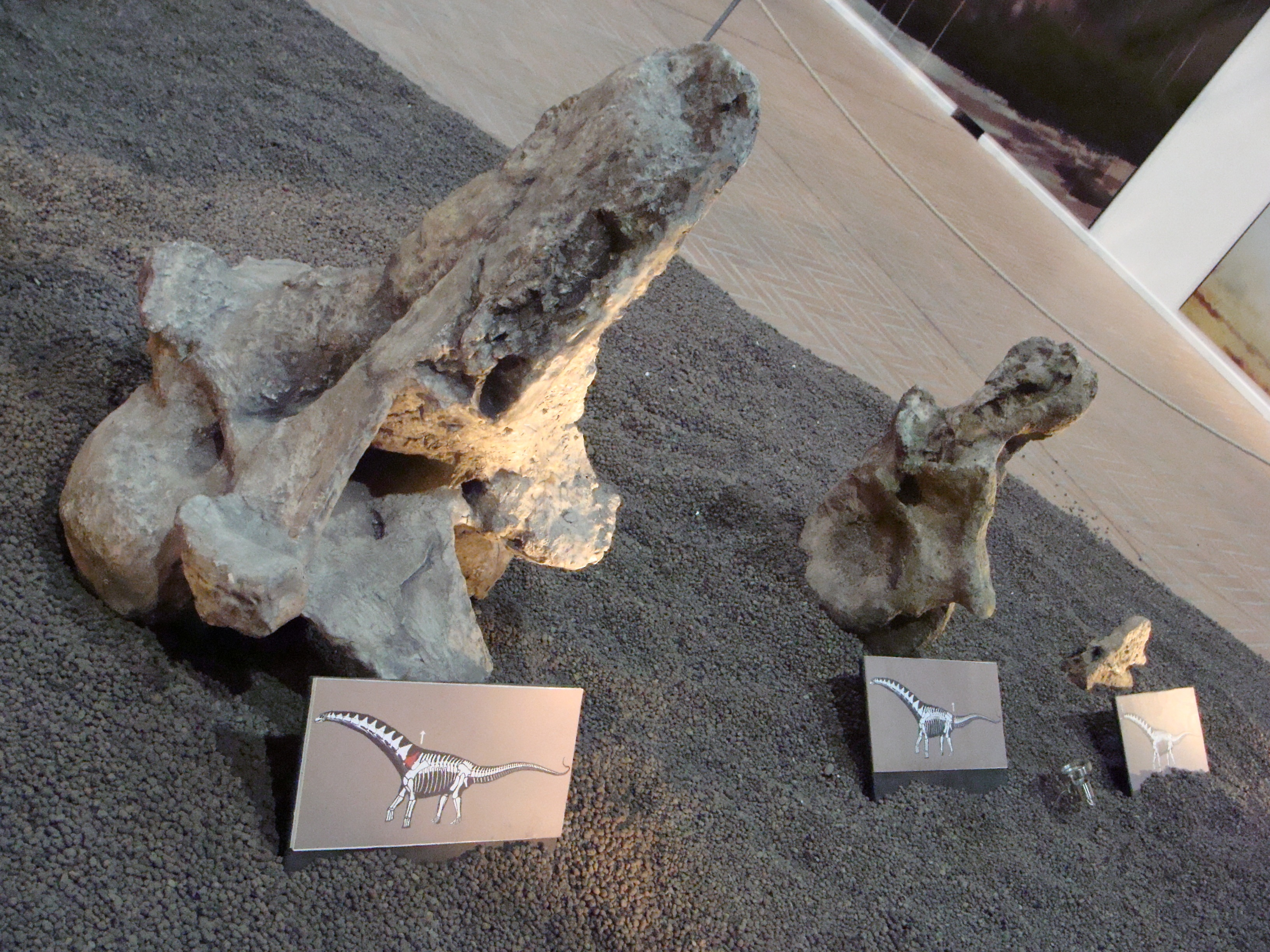
Vertebrae

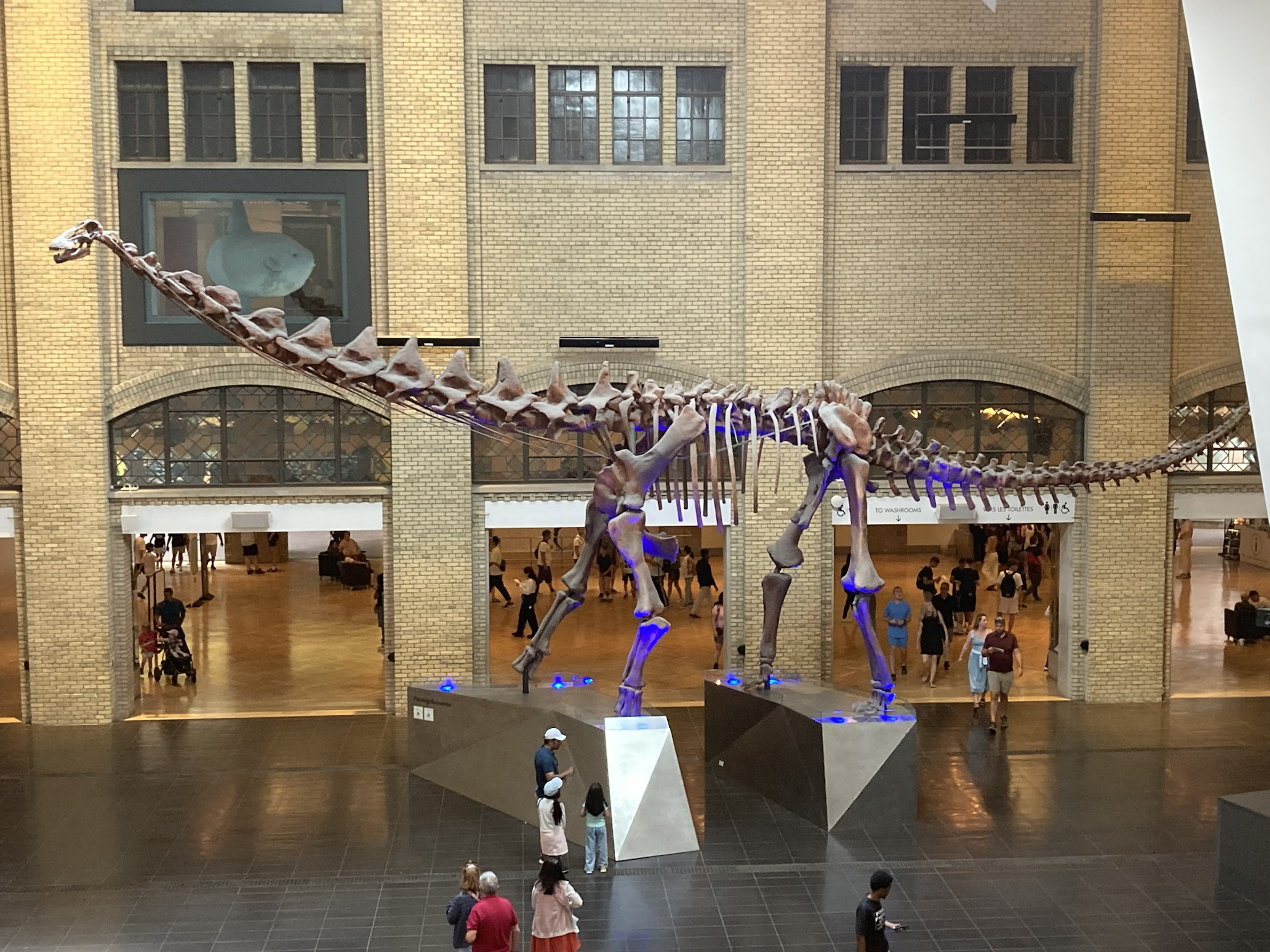
Mount at Royal Ontario Museum

In their phylogenetic analysis, Calvo and colleagues found Futalognkosaurus to be a member of the Titanosauridae (or Lithostrotia, depending on the definitions being used), and most closely related to Mendozasaurus. They defined a new clade for the group containing both Futalognkosaurus and Mendozasaurus, their common ancestor, and all descendants, which they named the Lognkosauria. The authors found Malawisaurus to be the sister group of this new clade. Another, much later member of Lognkosauria is the colossal Puertasaurus, which may be the biggest dinosaur so far known. Besides Futalognkosaurus, other fauna was discovered in the Futalognko site, including two further undescribed sauropod taxa, specimens of Megaraptor, Unenlagia and some pleurodiran turtles.

The following cladogram shows the results of an analysis by Calvo et al. in 2007, where they placed Futalognkosaurus within the group Titanosauria, more precisely the clade Lognkosauria:

- Titanosauria
  - Andesaurus
  - Titanosauridae
    - - Malawisaurus
      - Lognkosauria
        - Mendozasaurus
        - Futalognkosaurus
    - - Epachthosaurus
      - Eutitanosauria
        - - Rapetosaurus
          - - Aeolosaurini
              - Gondwanatitan
              - Aeolosaurus
            - - Rinconsaurus
              - Loma Lindero sp.
          - - Lirainosaurus
            - Saltasauridae
              - Opisthocoelicaudiinae
                - Opisthocoelicaudia
                - Alamosaurus
              - Saltasaurinae
                - Neuquensaurus
                - - Saltasaurus
                  - Rocasaurus
