= Teratopodus =

Teratopodus Temporal range: Late Cretaceous, (Campanian), 83–74.5 Ma

Trace fossil classification
- Kingdom: Animalia
- Phylum: Chordata
- Class: Reptilia
- Clade: Dinosauria
- Clade: Saurischia
- Clade: †Sauropodomorpha
- Clade: †Sauropoda
- Clade: †Macronaria
- Clade: †Titanosauria
- Ichnogenus: †Teratopodus; Tomaselli et al., 2022

Type ichnospecies
- †Teratopodus malarguensis Tomaselli et al., 2022

Dinosaur footprint

Teratopodus (meaning "monstrous foot") is an ichnogenus of titanosaurian sauropod footprint. It includes a single ichnospecies, Teratopodus malarguensis, known from prints found in the Late Cretaceous Anacleto Formation of Argentina. The Teratopodus tracks represent some of the best sauropod pes tracks currently known from South America.

== Description ==
The trackway was created by two titanosaur individuals, one of which was about 11 metres (36 ft) long, while the other was about 14 metres (46 ft) long. Analysis of the fossils shows that the dinosaurs walked from an area of humid ground to a more flooded area.

== Paleoenvironment ==
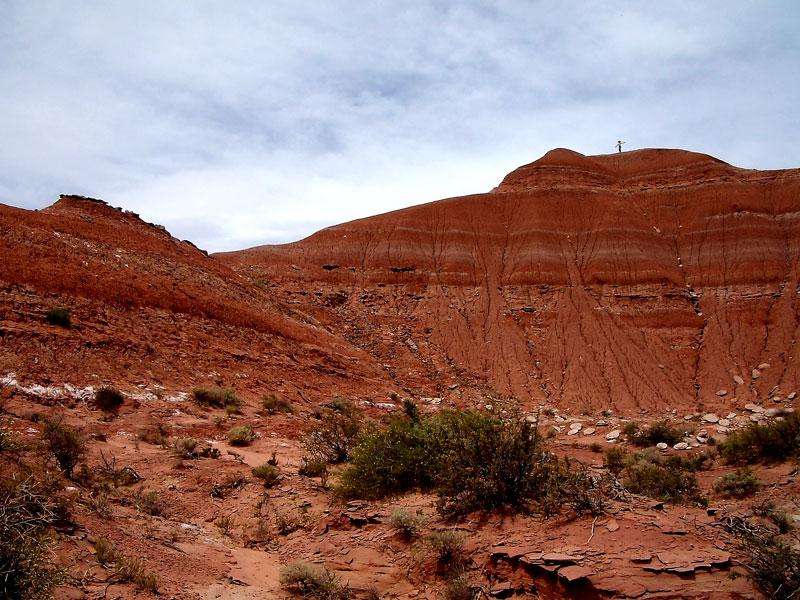
Layers of the Anacleto Formation

Several titanosaurs are known from the Anacleto Formation, including Pitekunsaurus, Narambuenatitan, Barrosasaurus, and Neuquensaurus. One of these dinosaurs potentially could have made the Teratopodus prints. Remains of the ornithopod Gasparinisaura and the theropods Abelisaurus and Aucasaurus have also been recovered from the formation.

== See also ==
- List of dinosaur ichnogenera
