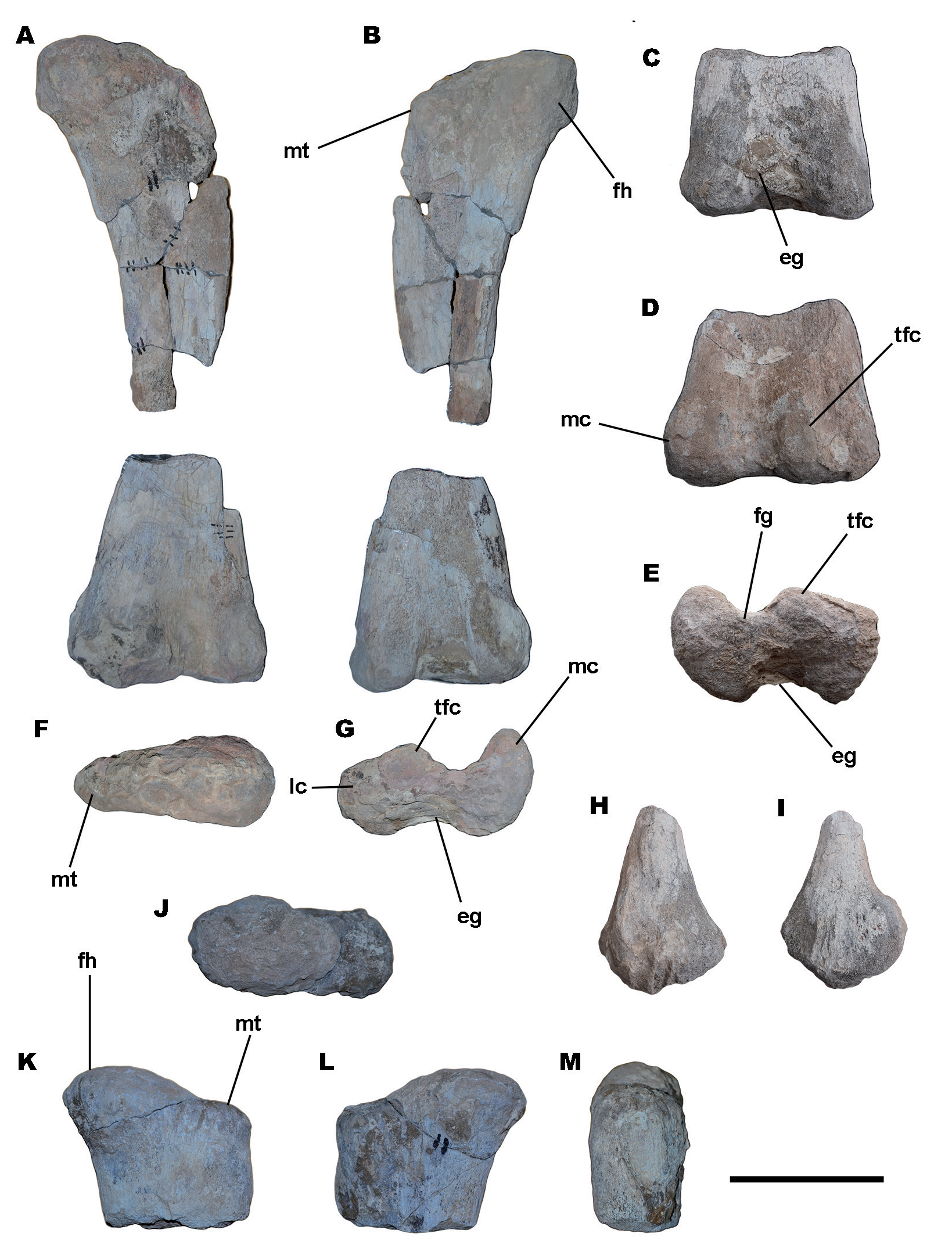
- Femora referred to Chadititan

Scientific classification
- Kingdom: Animalia
- Phylum: Chordata
- Class: Reptilia
- Clade: Dinosauria
- Clade: Saurischia
- Clade: †Sauropodomorpha
- Clade: †Sauropoda
- Clade: †Macronaria
- Clade: †Titanosauria
- Clade: †Rinconsauria
- Genus: †Chadititan; Agnolín et al., 2025
- Species: †C. calvoi

Binomial name
- †Chadititan calvoi Agnolín et al., 2025

= Chadititan =

Chadititan Temporal range: Campanian, 83–74.5 Ma

Extinct genus of titanosaur dinosaurs

Chadititan (meaning "titan of the salt") is an extinct genus of titanosaurian dinosaurs from the Late Cretaceous (Campanian) Anacleto Formation of Argentina. The genus contains a single species, C. calvoi, known from several fragmentary skeletons. Chadititan is characterized by its small size compared to related taxa and its particularly gracile limbs.

== Discovery and naming ==
Chadititan type locality at Linha São Luiz Site, Argentina

In 2025, Agnolín et al. reported on a diverse fossil locality in the Marín family Farm near General Roca city and the Salitral Moreno lowlands in Argentina, representing outcrops of the Anacleto Formation. Among the bones discovered were abundant titanosaur remains belonging to several individual animals, including dorsal and caudal vertebrae, a partial pubis and coracoid, and incomplete bones of the fore- and hindlimbs.

In 2025, Agnolín et al. described Chadititan calvoi as a new genus and species of titanosaurs based on these fossil remains. They established MPCN-Pv 1034—comprising nine caudal vertebrae, the top parts of both humeri and ulnae, the bottom part of the right radius, the end of the left pubis, both ends of the right femur, the top part of the left tibia and both ends of the right tibia and fibula, and indeterminate metapodials—as the holotype specimen. They further referred seven additional specimens, including a possible juvenile individual, of varying levels of completeness based on their comparable anatomy and discovery location. The generic name, Chadititan, combines the Mapudungun word chadi, meaning "salt"—in reference to the type locality being near a vast salt flat—with the word "titan", referencing the pre-Olympian gods of Greek mythology. The specific name, calvoi, honors Argentine paleontologist Jorge O. Calvo who coined the taxonomic group Rinconsauria, to which this taxon belongs.

== Description ==
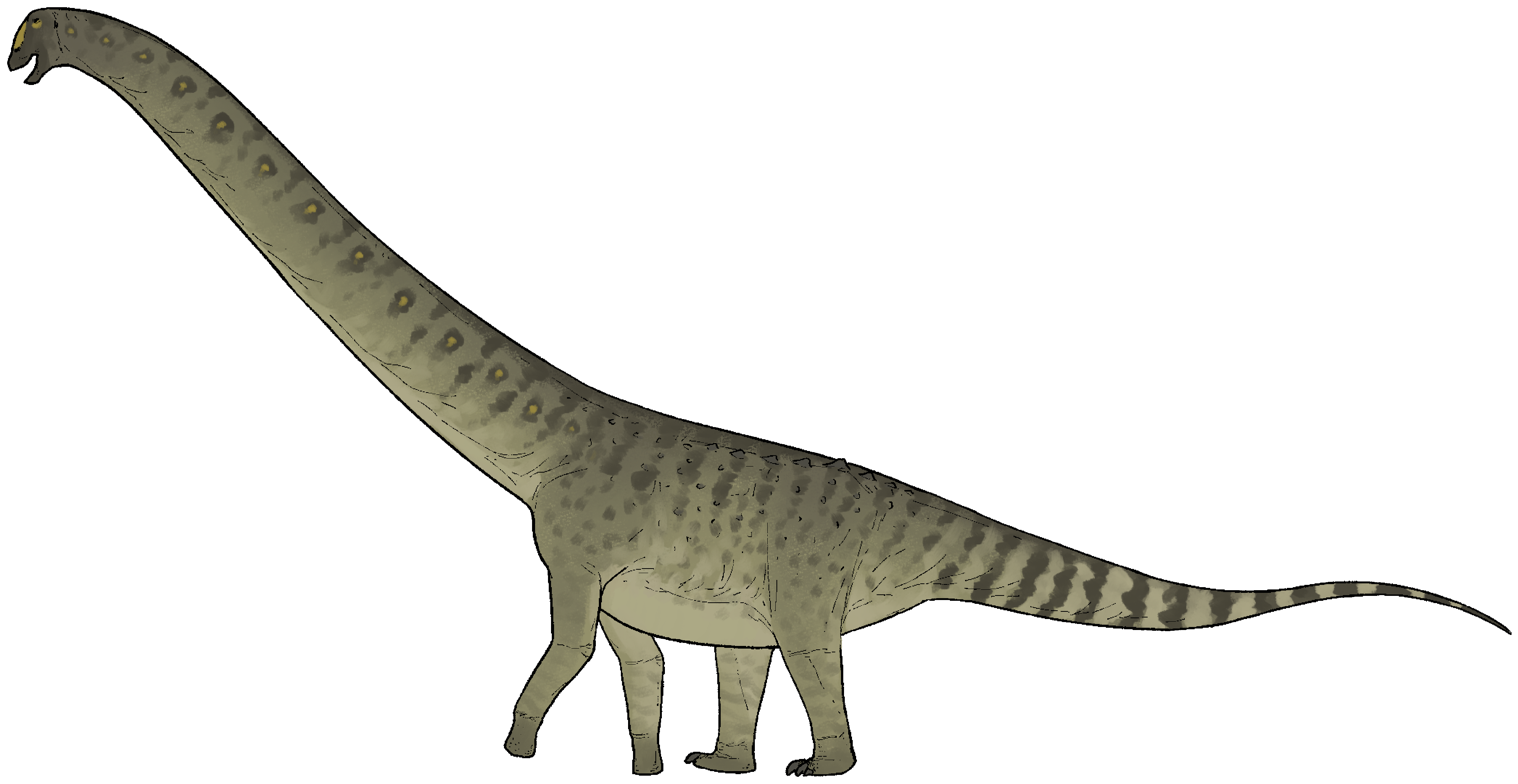
Speculative life restoration

Chadititan is a relatively small sauropod, with an estimated body length of 7 metres (23 ft). Although the known material is fragmentary, Chadititan shows several similarities to other rinconsaurian sauropods. The humerus and femur of Chadititan indicate that its limbs are gracile and relatively straight. Additionally, the anteriorly concave tail vertebrae are relatively long and narrow. No osteoderms were identified from the bonebed.

== Classification ==
In their phylogenetic analyses, Agnolín et al. (2025) recovered Chadititan as a member of the Rinconsauria. Their results are displayed in the cladogram below:

- Titanosauria
  - Andesaurus
  - - Huabeisaurus
    - Xianshanosaurus
    - - - Baurutitan
        - - Dreadnoughtus
          - - Epachthosaurus
            - - Malawisaurus
              - - - Rapetosaurus
                  - - Isisaurus
                    - Tapuiasaurus
                - - Alamosaurus
                  - Nemegtosaurus
                  - Neuquensaurus
                  - Opisthocoelicaudia
                  - Saltasaurus
      - - Bonitasaura
        - Rinconsauria
          - Chadititan
          - Muyelensaurus
          - Overosaurus
          - - Pitekunsaurus
            - Rinconsaurus
        - - Drusilasaura
          - Notocolossus
          - Puertasaurus
          - - Mendozasaurus
            - Petrobrasaurus
          - - Argentinosaurus
            - Patagotitan
          - - Futalognkosaurus
            - Quetecsaurus
        - - Uberabatitan
          - - Gondwanatitan
            - - Trigonosaurus
              - - Aeolosaurus
                - Arrudatitan
                - Bravasaurus
                - Punatitan
