= Anacleto Formation =

Geologic formation in Argentina

- Stratigraphic range: early-middle Campanian; ~83–74.5 Ma
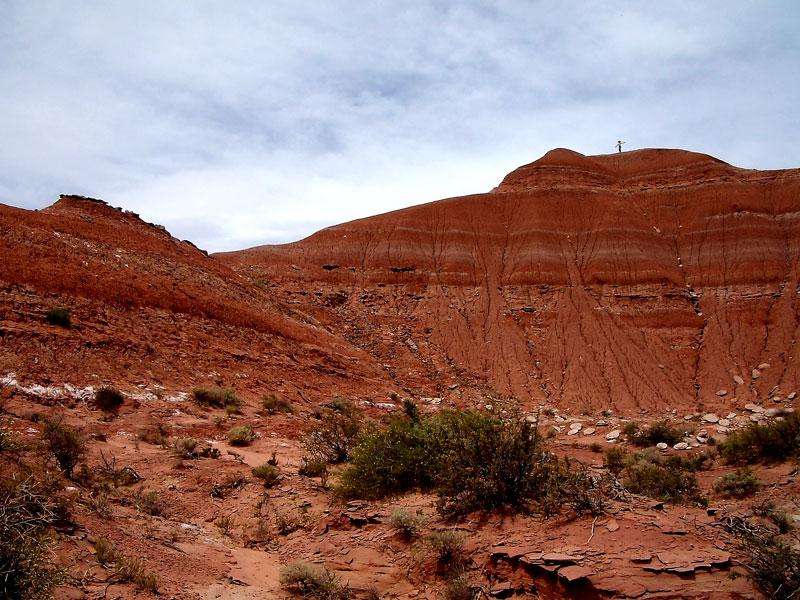
- Outcrop of the formation at Auca Mahuida
- Type: Geological formation
- Unit of: Neuquén Group; Río Colorado Subgroup
- Underlies: Malargüe Group; Allen Formation
- Overlies: Bajo de la Carpa Formation
- Thickness: 60–90 m (200–300 ft)

Lithology
- Primary: Mudstone
- Other: Sandstone, limestone

Location
- Location: Patagonia
- Coordinates: 37.9°S 68.5°W
- Approximate paleocoordinates: 40.8°S 53.0°W
- Region: Neuquén, Mendoza & Río Negro Provinces
- Country: Argentina
- Extent: Neuquén Basin

Type section
- Named for: Aguada de Anacleto
- Anacleto Formation (Argentina)

The Anacleto Formation is a geologic formation with outcrops in the Argentine Patagonian provinces of Mendoza, Río Negro, and Neuquén. It is the youngest formation within the Neuquén Group and belongs to the Río Colorado Subgroup. Formerly that subgroup was treated as a formation, and the Anacleto Formation was known as the Anacleto Member.

The type locality of this formation lies 40 kilometres (25 mi) west of the city of Neuquén. At its base, the Anacleto Formation conformably overlies the Bajo de la Carpa Formation, also of the Río Colorado Subgroup, and it is in turn unconformably overlain by the Allen Formation of the younger Malargüe Group.

The Anacleto Formation varies between 60 and 90 metres (200 and 300 ft) thick, and consists mainly of claystones and mudstones, purple and dark red in color, deposited in fluvial, lacustrine and floodplain environments. Geodes are often found scattered throughout this formation.

== Fossil content ==
Color key: Taxon / Reclassified taxon / Taxon falsely reported as present / Dubious taxon or junior synonym / Ichnotaxon / Ootaxon / Morphotaxon

Notes
Uncertain or tentative taxa are in small text
~~crossed out~~ taxa are discredited.

The following animals are known from bones found in the Anacleto Formation:

- several species of lizards
- several species of mammals

=== Crocodylomorphs ===
Crocodylomorphs reported from the Anacleto Formation
Genus	Species	Presence	Material	Notes	Images
Gasparinisuchus	G. peirosauroides	Cañadón Amarrillo, south Malargüe city, Mendoza Province.	PV-CRIDC-12 (right premaxilla and maxilla, isolated teeth, and part of the postcranial skeleton).	A peirosaurid also known from the Bajo de la Carpa Formation, originally referred to Peirosaurus	

=== Dinosaurs ===
==== Ornithischians ====
Ornithischians reported from the Anacleto Formation
Genus	Species	Stratigraphic position	Presence	Material	Notes	Images
Gasparinisaura	G. cincosaltensis		Cinco Saltos, Río Negro Province.	Multiple specimens.	A small ornithopod.	

==== Sauropods ====
Nests of dinosaur eggs, many with preserved embryos inside, have been discovered in large quantities at the famous Auca Mahuevo locality, and have been attributed to titanosaurs.

Sauropods reported from the Anacleto Formation
Genus	Species	Stratigraphic Position	Presence	Material	Notes	Images
Antarctosaurus	A. wichmannianus				A titanosaur.	
Barrosasaurus	B. casamiquelai	Lower	Neuquén Province.	Vertebrae.	A titanosaur.	
Chadititan	C. calvoi	Lower	General Roca city, Río Negro Province.	A few fragment holotype consists of caudal vertebrae, partial humeri, femur bone, ulna, and pubis.	A titanosaur.	
Laplatasaurus	L. araukanicus	Uppermost	Several localities in Patagonia.	Multiple specimens.	A titanosaur.	
Narambuenatitan	N. palomoi	Lower		Remains of a subadult.	A titanosaur.	
Neuquensaurus	N. australis	Uppermost	Cinco Saltos, Río Negro Province.	Six caudal vertebrae.	A saltasaurine.	
Pitekunsaurus	P. macayai			"Braincase, left frontal, one tooth, four cervical vertebrae, three dorsal vertebrae, four caudal vertebrae, right ulna and scapula, proximal extreme of left femur, rib fragments and uncertain remains".	A titanosaur.	
Teratopodus	T. malarguensis		Southern Mendoza Province.	Footprint trackways.	A titanosaur ichnotaxon.	

==== Theropods ====
The oldest known unequivocal bird footprints from South America were discovered in the Anacleto Formation. The small footprints were tentatively assigned to the ichnogenus Aquatilavipes and might have been produced by Patagopteryx (whose fossils were only found in the Bajo de la Carpa Formation however) or some unknown wader-like bird; they lack a hind toe. Ignotornis refers to similar footprints made by larger birds with a small hind toe; they might have been left by Neuquenornis, but this is also only known from the Bajo de la Carpa Formation. Footprints of these two ichnogenera have also been found elsewhere, but it must be understood that assignment to the same ichnogenus does not imply a close relatedness of the organisms that produced these traces, only a similar morphology.

Even smaller and somewhat unusual footprints assigned to Barrosopus are only known from the Anacleto Formation. They were almost certainly made by some tiny theropod, but whether this was a bird is not quite clear: the innermost front toes of the animal leaving these tracks attached in a position higher than the others. In that, and in their dimensions, they are a very close match for the odd-footed enantiornithine bird Yungavolucris brevipedalis, but this is only known from the Maastrichtian Lecho Formation which is some 10 million years younger.

Theropods reported from the Anacleto Formation
Genus	Species	Stratigraphic Position	Presence	Material	Notes	Images
Abelisauridae	Indeterminate	Lower	Northwest Patagonia.	MPCN-PV 69, consisting of a partial premaxilla, fragmentary vertebrae, proximal portion of both humeri, distal portion of the pubis, and an incomplete pedal ungual.	An indeterminate abelisaurid.	
Abelisaurus	A. comahuensis		Lago Pellegrini stone quarries.	Skull.	An abelisaurid, originally thought to be from the Allen Formation.	
Aerosteon	A. riocoloradensis		"Cañadon Amarillo (S 37.5°, W 70.5°), north of Cerro Colorado, 1 km north of the Río Colorado near the southern border of Mendoza Province, Argentina."	Skeletal remains.	A megaraptorid.	
Aucasaurus	A. garridoi	Upper	Auca Mahuevo.	Skeleton of an adult (MCF-PVPH-236).	An abelisaurid.	
Megaraptora indet.	Indeterminate	Upper	Auca Mahuevo.	MCF-PVPH-416, a fragmentary pubic boot with unfused proximal symphysial contact.	A large megaraptoran.	

=== Squamates ===
Squamates reported from the Anacleto Formation
Genus	Species	Presence	Material	Notes	Images
Dinilysia	D. sp.	Aguada Toledo, south of Mari Menuco Lake.	24 articulated mid-posterior trunk vertebrae with the base of their respective ribs (UNC-CIP 1).	A large snake.	

=== Testudines ===
Testudines reported from the Anacleto Formation
Genus	Species	Stratigraphic Position	Presence	Material	Notes	Images
Prochelidella	P. palomoi		Aguada Grande site, Neuquén Province.	A partially preserved skull, carapace remains, an almost complete plastron, and a left ilium (MAU-Pv-AG-452).	A chelid turtle.	
Yaminuechelys	Y. aff. maior	Lower	Neuquén Province.	Two specimens (MAU-Pv-N-475 & MAU-Pv-PR-455).	A long-necked chelid turtle.	

== See also ==
- List of fossil sites
- Los Alamitos Formation
- Los Blanquitos Formation
- Adamantina Formation
