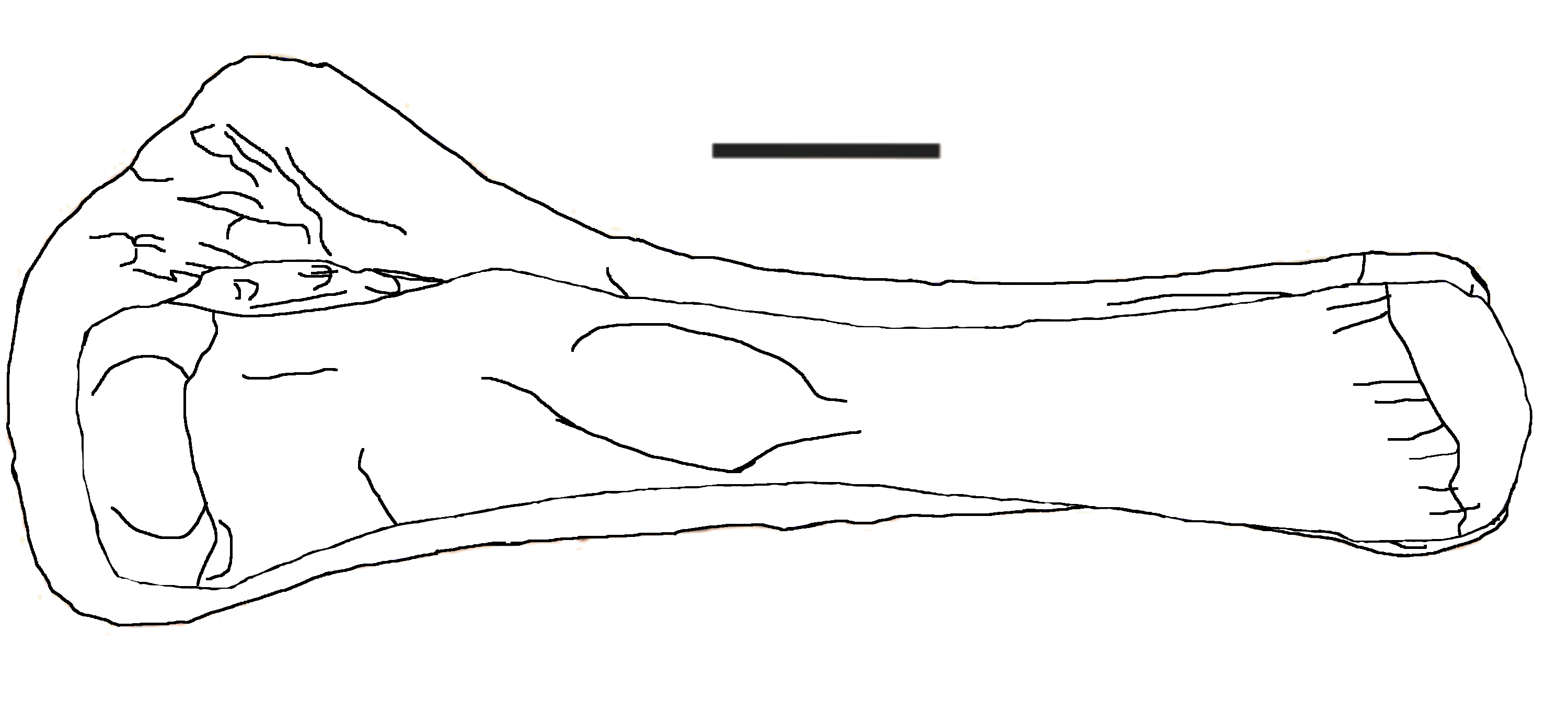
- Tibia & fibula of Laplatasaurus. Scale bar equals 10cm.

Scientific classification
- Kingdom: Animalia
- Phylum: Chordata
- Class: Reptilia
- Clade: Dinosauria
- Clade: Saurischia
- Clade: †Sauropodomorpha
- Clade: †Sauropoda
- Clade: †Macronaria
- Clade: †Titanosauria
- Genus: †Laplatasaurus von Huene, 1929

Type species
- †Laplatasaurus araukanicus von Huene, 1929

Synonyms
- Laplatasaurus wichmannianus von Huene, 1929; Titanosaurus araukanicus von Huene, 1929 vide Powell, 1992

= Laplatasaurus =

Laplatasaurus Temporal range: Campanian ~80–70 Ma

Extinct genus of dinosaurs

Laplatasaurus (meaning "La Plata lizard", named for La Plata, Argentina) is a genus of titanosaurian sauropod dinosaur that lived during the Late Cretaceous in South America, with the holotype and only known specimen found in the Anacleto Formation.

== Naming and description ==
The genus was named in 1927 by Friedrich von Huene, but without a description, so that it remained a nomen nudum. In 1929 the type species, Laplatasaurus araukanicus, was described by Huene. The generic name refers to La Plata. The specific name is derived from the Araucanos or Mapuche. By accident Huene in 1929 also mentioned a "Laplatasaurus wichmannianus" but that was a lapsus calami for Antarctosaurus wichmannianus. In 1933 however, he and Charles Alfred Matley renamed Titanosaurus madagascariensis to Laplatasaurus madagascariensis. This last species is today commonly referred to the original Titanosaurus.

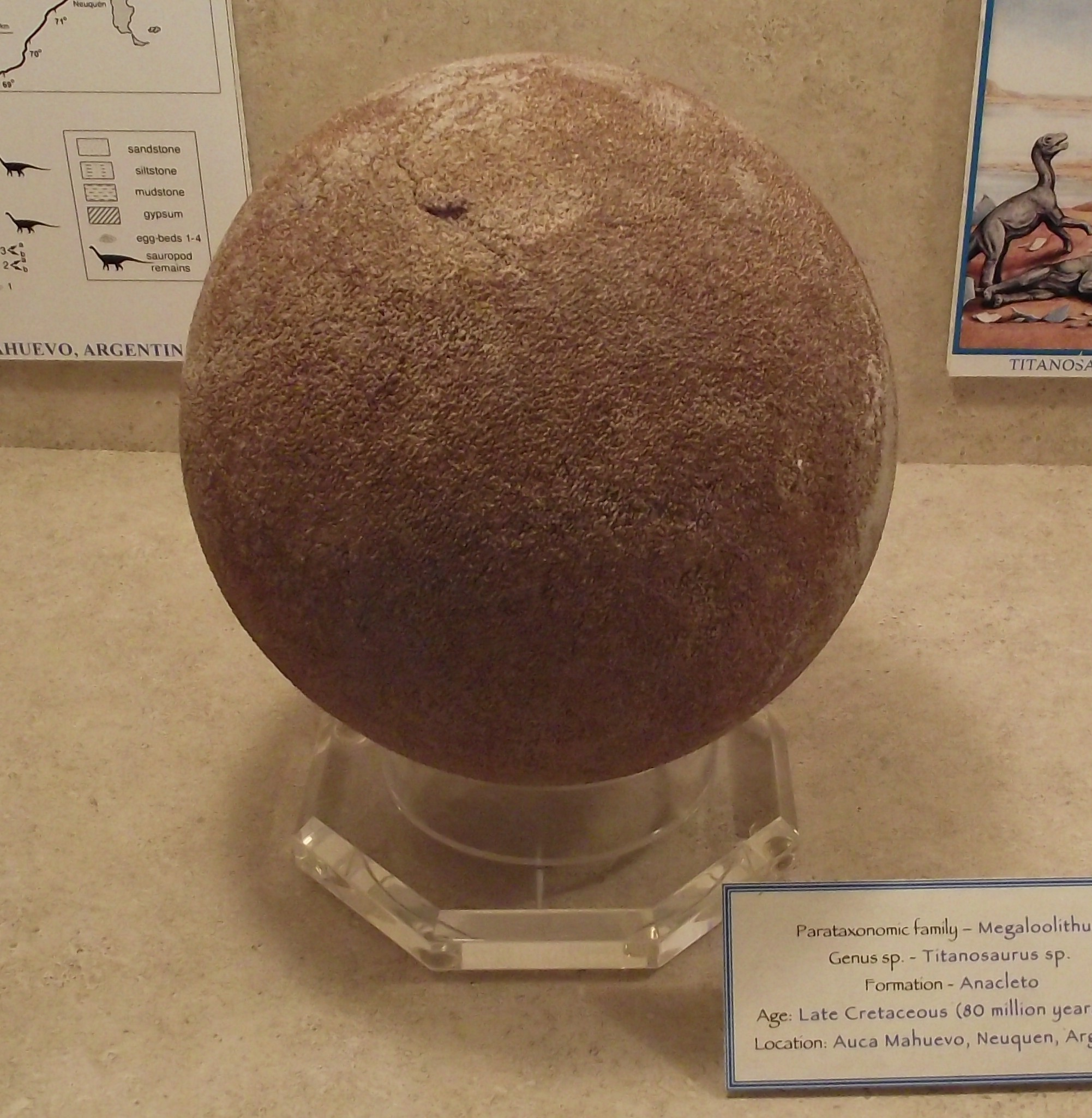
Megaloolithus egg from the Anacleto Formation that was previously assigned to Titanosaurus that may have instead been laid by Laplatasaurus

Huene based Laplatasaurus on fragmentary material found in three locations in Argentina, in strata of the Anacleto Formation, dating from the Campanian faunal stage. It consisted of limb elements, some dorsal vertebrae and a series of caudal vertebrae. Part of the finds had earlier been referred by Richard Lydekker to Titanosaurus australis. Huene never assigned a holotype, but in 1979 José Fernando Bonaparte chose MLP 26-306 as the lectotype, a specimen consisting of a tibia and a fibula that perhaps originate from different individuals.

Huene assigned those fossils to Laplatasaurus that seemed to indicate a rather large yet at the same time elegantly built sauropod. The about eighteen metres (59 ft) long Laplatasaurus was perhaps similar to Saltasaurus. Osteoderms forming an armored plating on the back, have been referred to Laplatasaurus but the association is uncertain. These plates had much smaller ridges than those of Saltasaurus.

A Megaloolithus egg found in the Anacleto Formation in Auca Mahuevo, Argentina that was once assigned to Titanosaurus may have instead been laid by Laplatasaurus.

== Taxonomy ==
Huene placed Laplatasaurus in the Titanosauridae, which is still a common classification. In his 2003 review of South American titanosaurs, Jaime Eduardo Powell assigned Laplatasaurus to Titanosaurus, creating the new combination Titanosaurus aurakanicus. Others however, continued to treat Laplatasaurus as valid genus separate from Titanosaurus.

A 2015 re-assessment of Laplatasaurus found it to be closely related to Bonitasaura, Futalognkosaurus, Mendozasaurus, and Uberabatitan. The genus was restricted to the lectotype, and the material from Rancho de Avila was assigned to cf. Bonitasaura sp.
