= Auca Mahuevo =

Fossil deposit in Argentina

Auca Mahuevo is a Cretaceous lagerstätte in the eroded badlands of the Patagonian province of Neuquén, Argentina. The sedimentary layers of the Anacleto Formation at Auca Mahuevo were deposited between 83.5 and 79.5 million years before present and offer a view of a fossilized titanosaurid sauropod hatchery.

== Description ==
At Auca Mahuevo dinosaur eggs containing identifiable embryonic remains have been the most spectacular discoveries. The eggs retain casts of the membrana testacea, the internal membrane that adheres to the shell, familiar to anyone who has peeled a hard-boiled egg. The context revealed a vast rookery of excavated nest structures that can be compared to living egg-layers such as turtles, crocodilians and birds. Even their spacing within the nesting locality (two to three meters apart) can be assessed. Reconstruction of nesting strategies suggest that shallow pits with rims were excavated and plant material incorporated in the surface.

The Auca Mahuevo lagerstätte was discovered during two expeditions, in 1997 and 1999, by Luis Chiappe, Lowell Dingus, and Rodolfo Coria, who were looking for fossilized birds. The site is now officially protected.

== See also ==
- List of fossil sites (with link directory)
- Neuquén Group
