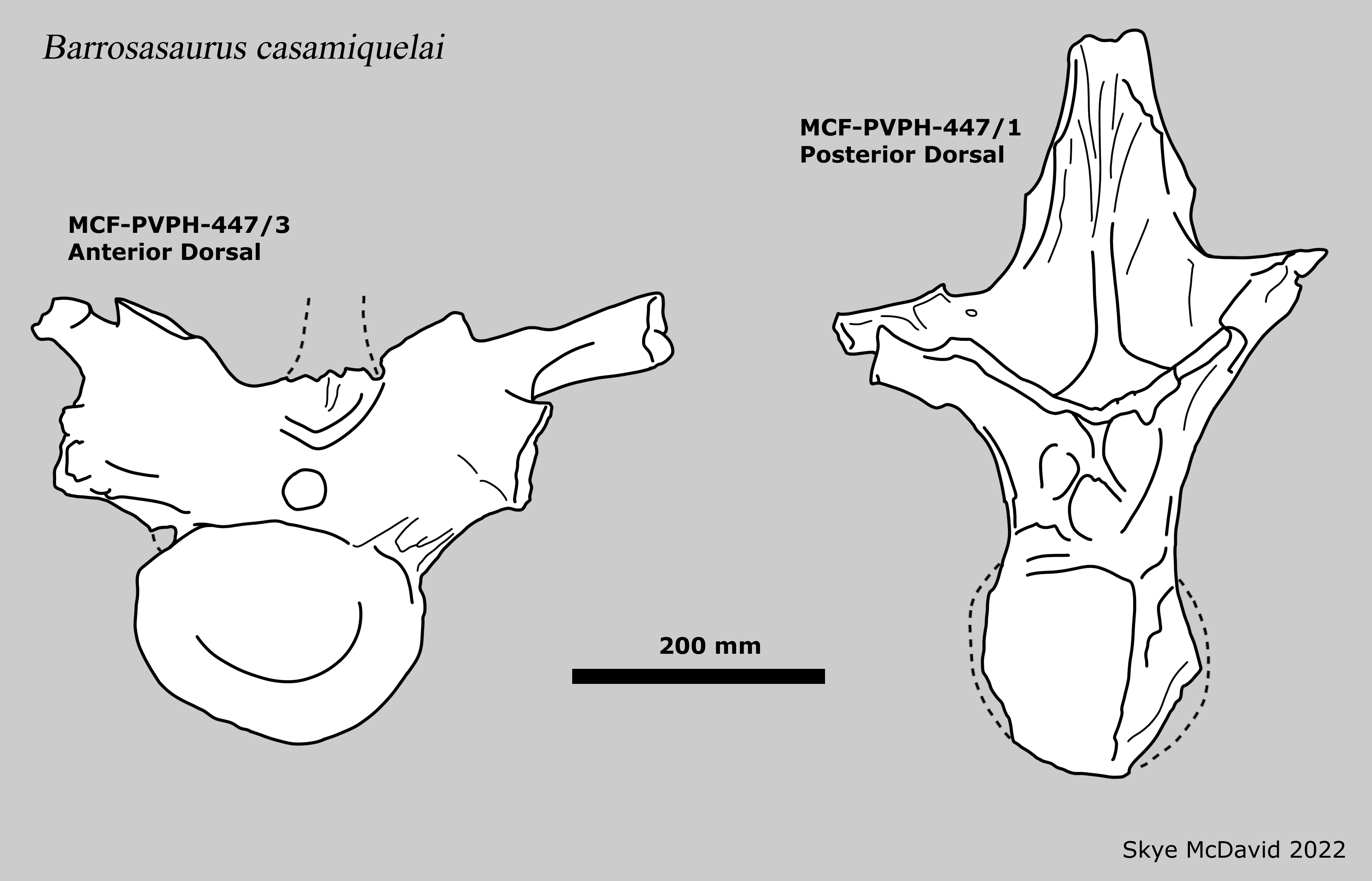
- Illustration of holotype vertebrae

Scientific classification
- Domain: Eukaryota
- Kingdom: Animalia
- Phylum: Chordata
- Clade: Dinosauria
- Clade: Saurischia
- Clade: †Sauropodomorpha
- Clade: †Sauropoda
- Clade: †Macronaria
- Clade: †Titanosauria
- Genus: †Barrosasaurus; Salgado & Coria, 2009

Species
- †B. casamiquelai Salgado & Coria (type)

= Barrosasaurus =

Barrosasaurus Temporal range: Late Cretaceous

Extinct genus of dinosaurs

Barrosasaurus is a genus of titanosaurian sauropod dinosaur, first described by paleontologists Leonardo Salgado and Rodolfo Coria in 2009. The fossils, consisting of three fossil dorsal (back) vertebrae, are well-preserved but incomplete. They were discovered in the Anacleto Formation of the Neuquén province of western Argentina. The type species is Barrosasaurus casamiquelai. The genus name is named after the Sierra Barrosa in Neuquén. The specific epithet honours the Argentinian paleontologist Rodolfo Magín Casamiquela. It has been estimated to be 18 meters (60 ft) in length and 13.5 tonnes (14.9 short tons) in weight.
