= Pitekunsaurus =

Pitekunsaurus Temporal range: Late Cretaceous, Campanian

Scientific classification
- Domain: Eukaryota
- Kingdom: Animalia
- Phylum: Chordata
- Clade: Dinosauria
- Clade: Saurischia
- Clade: †Sauropodomorpha
- Clade: †Sauropoda
- Clade: †Macronaria
- Clade: †Titanosauria
- Clade: †Lithostrotia
- Genus: †Pitekunsaurus; Filippi & Garrido, 2008

Type species
- †Pitekunsaurus macayai Filippi & Garrido, 2008

Extinct genus of dinosaurs

Pitekunsaurus is a genus of titanosaurian sauropod dinosaur from the Late Cretaceous Anacleto Formation of Neuquén, Argentina. It was described by L. Filippi and A. Garrido in 2008. The type species is P. macayai. The generic name is derived from Mapudungun pitekun, meaning "to discover", the epitheton honours the discoverer, oil company explorer Luis Macaya, who found the fossil in April 2004.

== Classification ==
Pitekunsaurus appears to be a genus of aeolosaurid, most closely related to the genera Gondwanatitan and Aeolosaurus. Its braincase closely resembles that of the aeolosaurid Muyelensaurus as well as the titanosaurs incertae sedis Vahiny and Jainosaurus. It cannot be compared to the more closely related Aeolosaurus and Gondwanatitan in this regard, as neither genus is known from cranial material.
