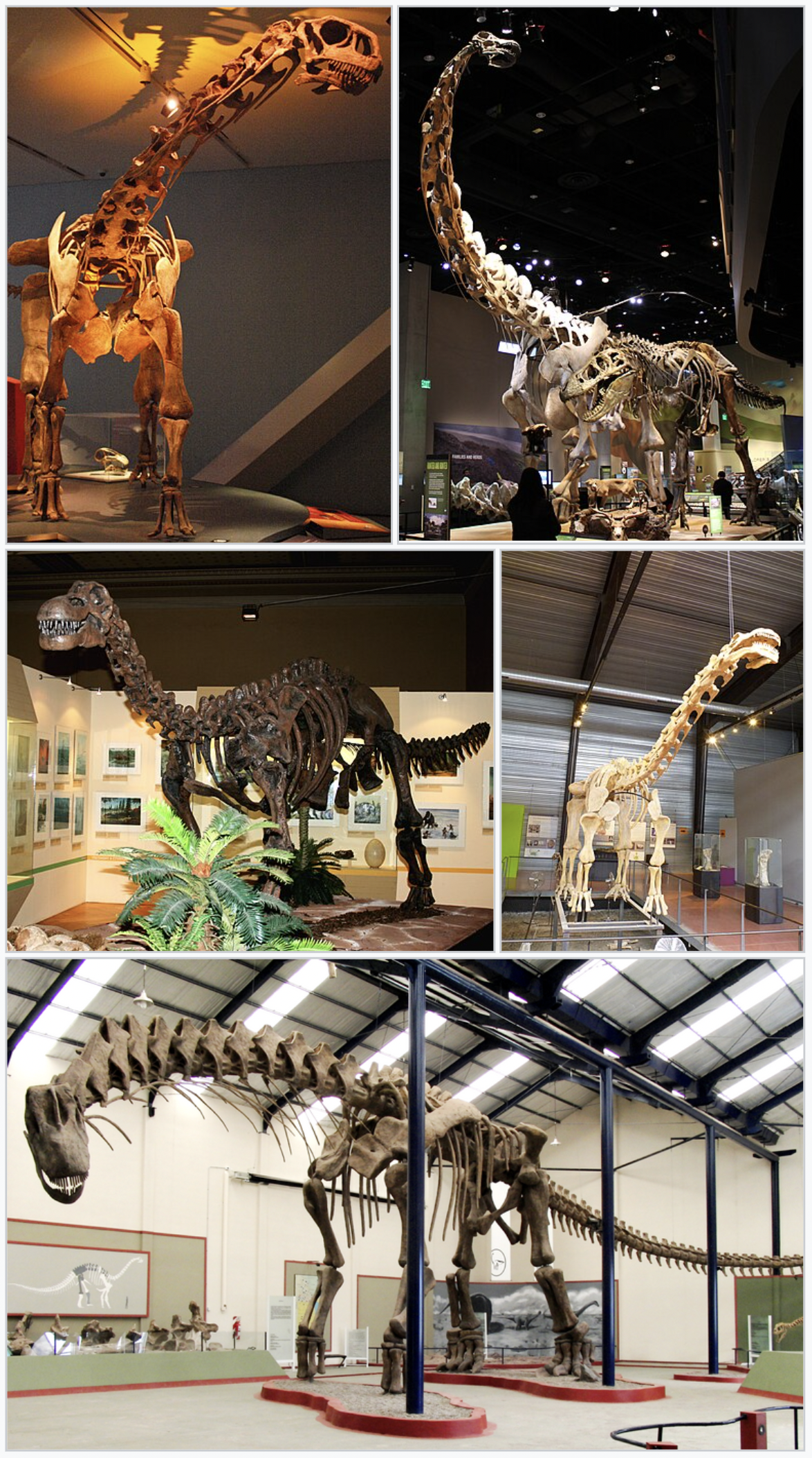
- Five titanosaurs (top left to bottom right): Malawisaurus, Alamosaurus, Epachthosaurus, Ampelosaurus, and Argentinosaurus

Scientific classification
- Kingdom: Animalia
- Phylum: Chordata
- Class: Reptilia
- Clade: Dinosauria
- Clade: Saurischia
- Clade: †Sauropodomorpha
- Clade: †Sauropoda
- Clade: †Macronaria
- Clade: †Somphospondyli
- Clade: †Titanosauria; Bonaparte & Coria, 1993

Subgroups
- †Diamantinasauria?
- †Lithostrotia
Titanosaurs of uncertain affinity and basal genera
- †Abdarainurus
- †Adamantisaurus
- †Aegyptosaurus?
- †Andesaurus
- †Angolatitan?
- †Arackar
- †Argyrosaurus
- †Atacamatitan
- †Austroposeidon
- †Baotianmansaurus
- †Barrosasaurus
- †Baurutitan
- †Bonatitan
- †Borealosaurus
- †Brasilotitan
- †Bruhathkayosaurus
- †Campylodoniscus?
- †Choconsaurus
- †Clasmodosaurus
- †Daxiatitan
- †Dongyangosaurus
- †Dreadnoughtus
- †Gandititan
- †Hamititan
- †Huabeisaurus?
- †Hypselosaurus
- †Iuticosaurus
- †Jiangshanosaurus?
- †Kaijutitan
- †Karongasaurus
- †Laplatasaurus
- †Ligabuesaurus?
- †Macrurosaurus
- †Malarguesaurus?
- †Narambuenatitan
- †Ninjatitan
- †Nullotitan
- †Pellegrinisaurus
- †Pitekunsaurus
- †Ruyangosaurus
- †Tambatitanis?
- †Tastavinsaurus?
- †Tiamat
- †Titanosaurus
- †Traukutitan
- †Trigonosaurus
- †Uberabatitan
- †Utetitan
- †Wintonotitan?
- †Xianshanosaurus

= Titanosauria =

Titanosaurs Temporal range: Cretaceous, 140–66 Ma

Extinct clade of dinosaurs

Titanosaurs (or titanosaurians; members of the group Titanosauria) were a diverse group of sauropod dinosaurs, including genera from every continent. The titanosaurs were the last surviving group of long-necked sauropods, with taxa still thriving at the time of the extinction event at the end of the Cretaceous. This group includes some of the largest land animals known to have ever existed, such as Patagotitan, estimated at 37 m (121 ft) long with a mass of 69 tonnes (76 tons), and the comparably sized Argentinosaurus and Puertasaurus from the same region.

The group's name alludes to the mythological Titans of ancient Greek mythology, via the type genus (now considered a nomen dubium) Titanosaurus. Together with the brachiosaurids and relatives, titanosaurs make up the larger sauropod clade Titanosauriformes. Titanosaurs have long been a poorly known group, and the relationships among titanosaur species are still not well understood.

== Fossil record ==
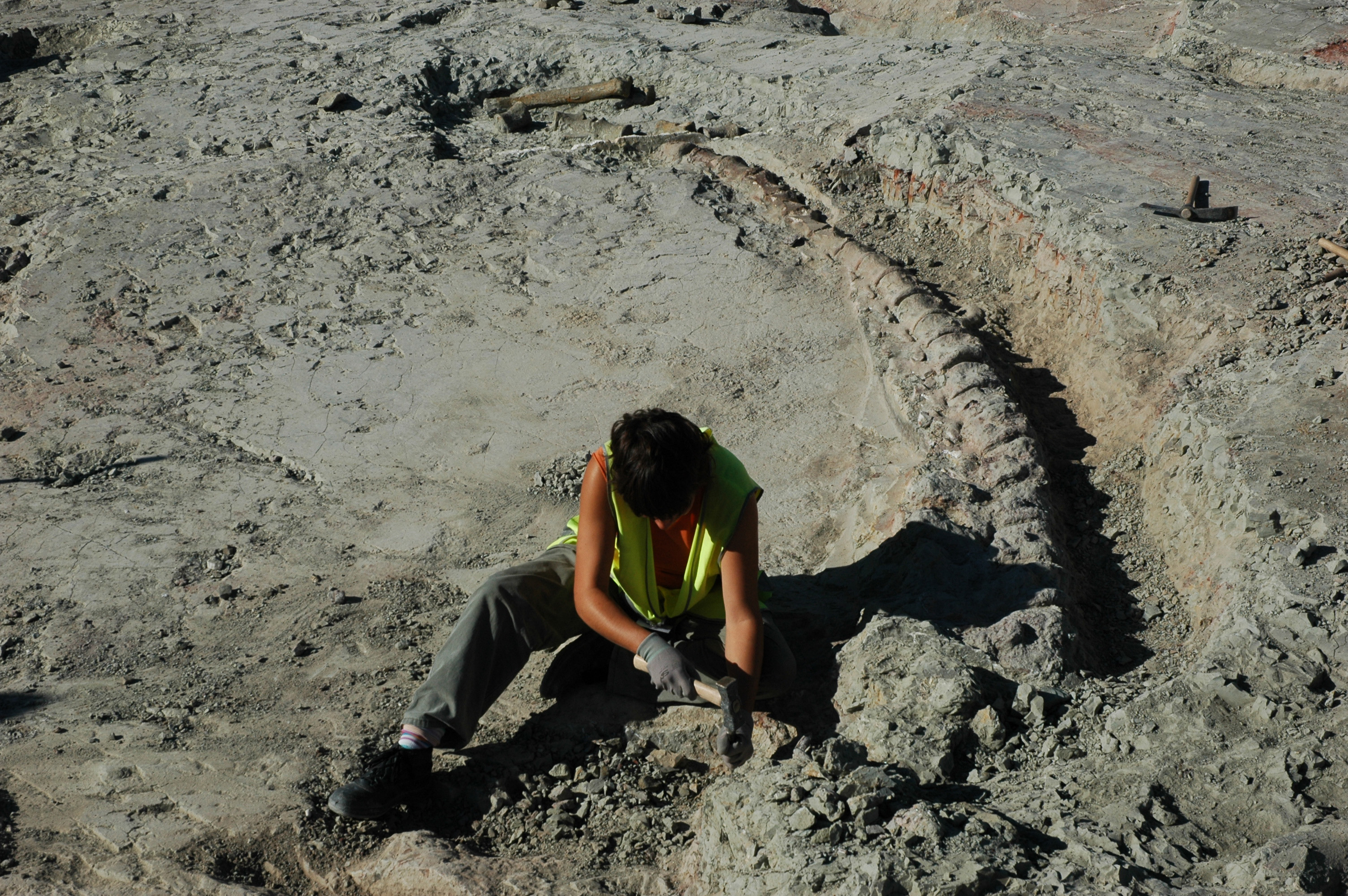
Excavation of titanosaur fossils at the Lo Hueco fossil site in Spain

Due to the near-global distribution of titanosaurs during the Cretaceous, titanosaur fossils have been found on every continent, including Antarctica. However, titanosaurs have the least complete fossil record of any major sauropodomorph group. No complete titanosaur skeletons are known, and many species are only known from a few bones. Titanosaur skulls are especially rare. Though fragmentary cranial remains are known for several titanosaur genera, nearly complete skulls have been described for only four: Nemegtosaurus, Rapetosaurus, Sarmientosaurus, and Tapuiasaurus. As is the case in most other sauropod groups, there are few titanosaur specimens with complete necks preserving all of the cervical vertebrae in sequence.

Only three complete titanosaur necks are known: the holotype of Futalognkosaurus and two undescribed specimens from Argentina. A fourth specimen, of an unidentified titanosaur from Brazil, preserves a nearly complete neck, with only the atlas, the tiny vertebra forming the joint between the skull and neck, missing. Only five titanosaur specimens preserve complete, articulated hind feet. This incompleteness is especially significant for giant titanosaurs, which are generally known from disarticulated and fragmentary remains.

Titanosaurs are one of the few groups of dinosaurs for which fossil eggs are known. The fossil site of Auca Mahuevo preserves a titanosaur nesting ground. Some titanosaur eggs have been found containing fossil embryos, which even preserve fossil skin. These fossil embryos are among the few titanosaur specimens to preserve complete skulls.

== Description ==
Titanosauria have the largest range of body size of any sauropod clade, and includes both the largest known sauropods and some of the smallest. One of the largest titanosaurs, Patagotitan, had a body mass estimated to be 69 tonnes (76 tons), whereas one of the smallest, Magyarosaurus, had a body mass of approximately 900 kilograms (2,000 lb). Even relatively closely related titanosaurs could have very different body sizes, as the small rinconsaurs were closely related to the gigantic lognkosaurs. Fossils from perhaps the largest dinosaur ever found were discovered in 2021 in the Neuquén Province of northwest Patagonia, Argentina. It is believed that they are from a titanosaur. Some of the smallest titanosaurs, such as Magyarosaurus, inhabited Europe, which was largely made up of islands during the Cretaceous, and were likely island dwarfs. Another taxon of tiny titanosaurs, Ibirania, lived a non-insular context in Upper Cretaceous Brazil, and is an example of nanism resultant from other ecological pressures.

=== Head and neck ===
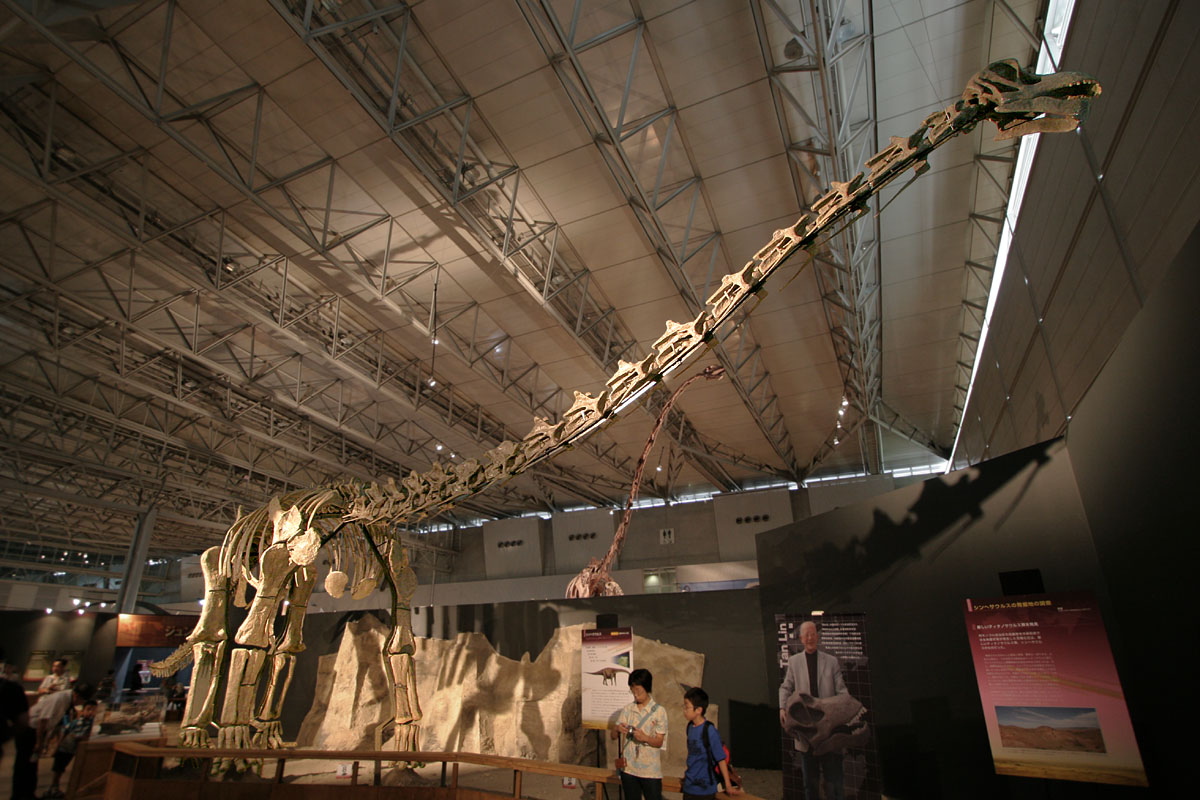
Unnamed titanosaur from Japan labelled "Xinghesaurus"

The heads of titanosaurs are poorly known. However, several different cranial morphologies are apparent. In some species, such as Sarmientosaurus, the head resembled that of brachiosaurids. In others, such as Rapetosaurus and Nemegtosaurus, the head resembled that of diplodocids. In some titanosaurs, the skull was especially diplodocid-like due to square-shaped jaws; the titanosaur Antarctosaurus is especially similar to the rebbachisaurid Nigersaurus. Titanosaurs had small heads, even when compared with other sauropods. The head was also wide, similar to the heads of Camarasaurus and Brachiosaurus, though somewhat more elongated. Titanosaurian nostrils were large ("macronarian") and all had crests formed by the nasal bones. Their teeth were either somewhat spatulate (spoon-like) or like pegs or pencils, but were always very small.

Titanosaur necks were of average length for sauropods, and their tails were whip-like though not as long as in the diplodocids. While the pelvis was slimmer than some sauropods, the pectoral (chest) area was much wider, giving them a uniquely "wide-legged" stance. As a result, the fossilized trackways of titanosaurs are distinctly broader than those of other sauropods. Their forelimbs were also stocky, and often longer than their hind limbs. Unlike other sauropods, some titanosaurs had no digits, walking only on horseshoe-shaped "stumps" made up of the columnar metacarpal bones. Their vertebrae (back bones) were solid (not hollowed-out), which may be a reversal to more basal saurischian characteristics. Their spinal column was relatively flexible, likely making them more agile than other sauropods, though at the expense of rearing on their hind legs compared to the Diplodocoids. One of the most characteristic features shared by most titanosaurs were their procoelous caudal vertebrae, with ball-and-socket articulations between the vertebral centra.

=== Torso and limbs ===
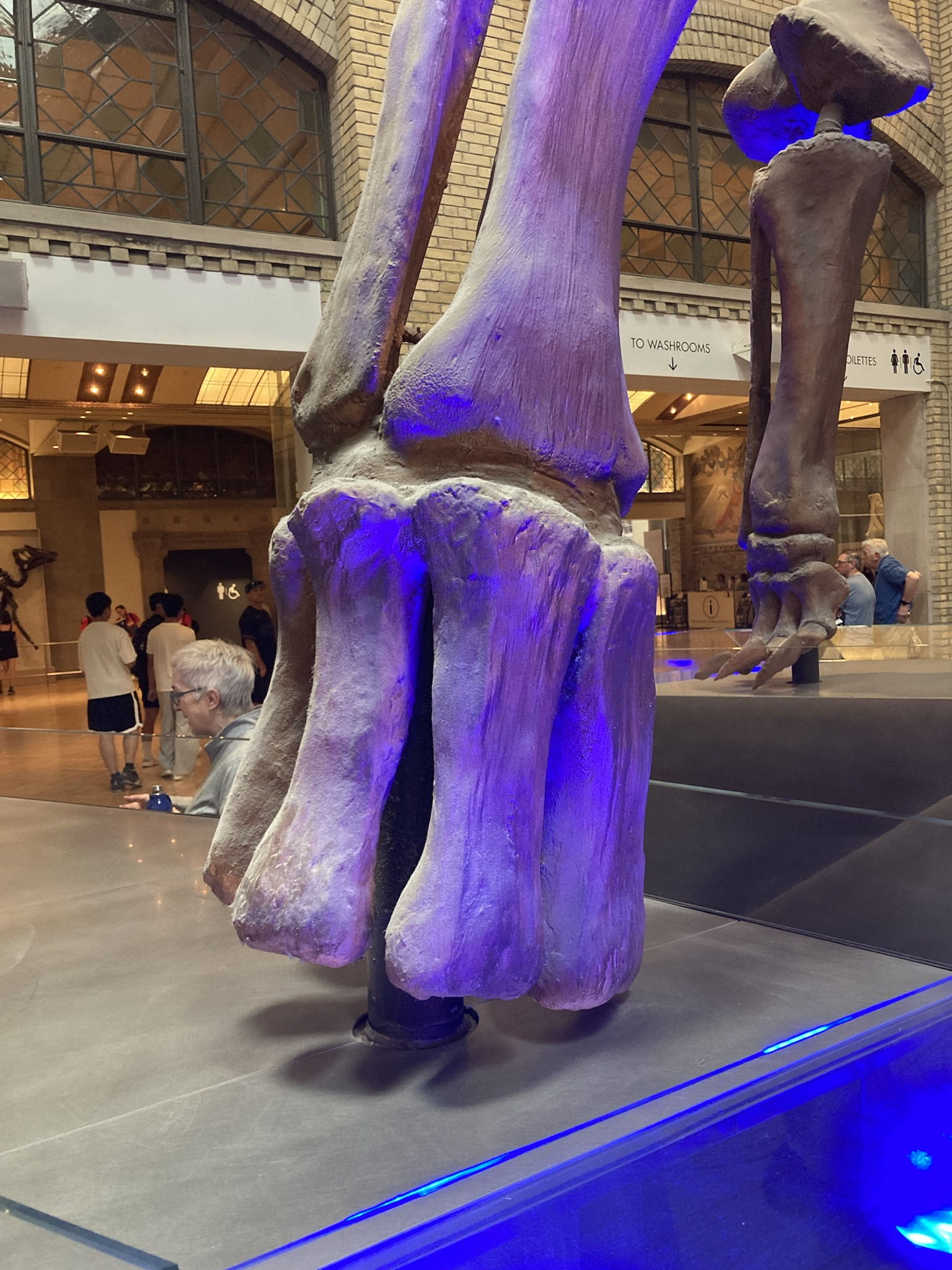
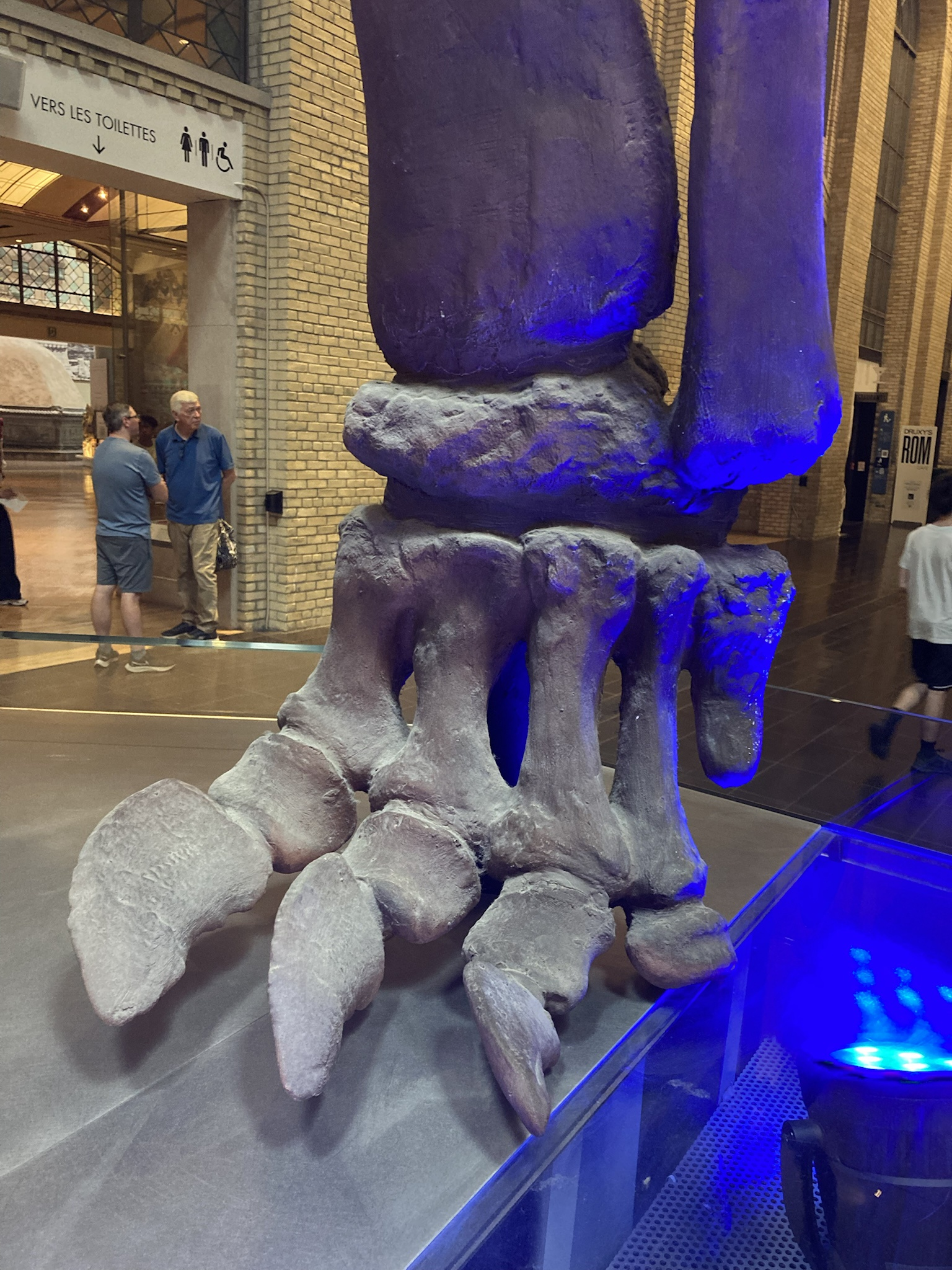
Hand (left) and hindfoot (right) of a typical titanosaur

The dorsal vertebrae of titanosaurs show multiple derived features among sauropods. Similarly to the Rebbachisauridae, titanosaurs lost the hyposphene-hypantrum articulations, a set of surfaces between vertebrae that prevent additional rotation of the bones. Andesaurus, one of the most basal titanosaurs, shows a normal hyposphene. The same area is reduced in Argentinosaurus to only two ridges, and is fully absent in taxa like Opisthocoelicaudia and Saltasaurus. Both Argentinosaurus and Epachthosaurus bear similar intermediate "hyposphenal ridges", which suggests they represent a more primitive form of dorsal vertebrae.

Sauropod hands already are highly derived from other dinosaurs, being reduced into columnar metacarpals and blocky phalanges with fewer claws. However, titanosaurs evolved the manus even further, completely losing the phalanges and heavily modifying the metacarpals. Argyrosaurus is the only titanosaur with preserved carpals. Other taxa like Epachthosaurus show a reduction of phalanges to one or two bones. Opisthocoelicaudia shows even more reduction of the hand than other titanosaurs, with both carpals and phalanges completely absent. However, Diamantinasaurus, while lacking carpals, preserves a manual formula of 2–1–1–1–1, including a thumb claw and phalanges on all other digits. This, coupled with the preservation of a single phalanx on digit IV of Epachthosaurus and potentially Opisthocoelicaudia (further study is necessary), show that preservation biases may be responsible for the lack of hand phalanges in these taxa. This suggests that Alamosaurus, Neuquensaurus, Saltasaurus and Rapetosaurus - all known from imperfect or disarticulated remains previously associated with a lack of phalanges - may have had phalanges but lost them after death.

Titanosaurs have a poor fossil record of their pedes (feet), only being complete in five definitive titanosaurs. Among these, Notocolossus is the largest, and also has the most specialized pes: like all titanosaurs, its pes is composed of short, thick metatarsals of approximately the same lengths; however, metatarsals I and V are notably more robust than in other taxa.

=== Integument ===
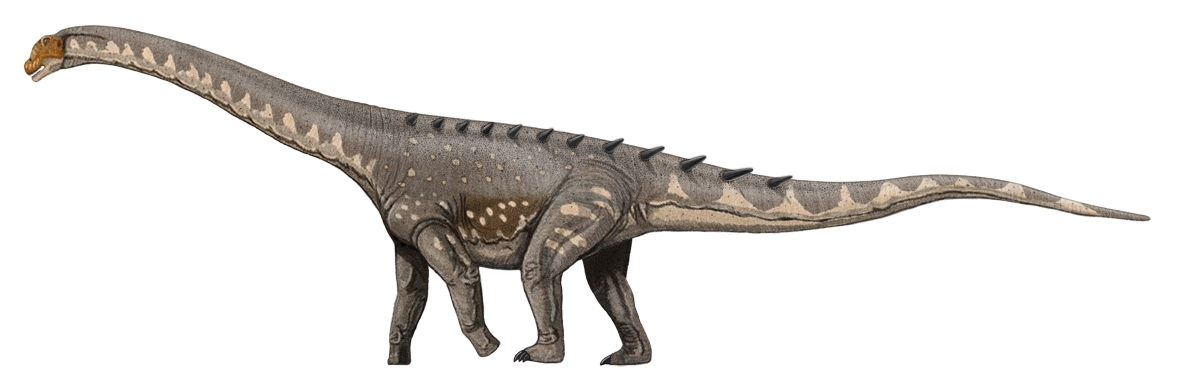
Ampelosaurus, a titanosaur with osteoderms, depicted with the osteoderms arranged in a pair of rows

From skin impressions found with fossils, it has been determined that the skin of many titanosaurs was armored with a small mosaic of small, bead-like scales surrounding larger scales. While most titanosaurs were very large animals, many were fairly average in size compared to other giant dinosaurs. Some island-dwelling dwarf titanosaurs, such as Magyarosaurus, were probably the result of allopatric speciation and insular dwarfism.

Some titanosaurs had osteoderms. Osteoderms were first confirmed in the genus Saltasaurus but are now known to have been present in a variety of titanosaurs within the clade Lithostrotia. The exact arrangement of osteoderms on the body of a titanosaur is not known, but some paleontologists consider it likely that the osteoderms were arranged in two parallel rows on the animal's back, an arrangement similar to the plates of stegosaurs. Several other arrangements have been proposed, such as a single row along the midline, and it is possible that different species had different arrangements. The osteoderms were certainly far more sparse than those of ankylosaurs, and did not completely cover the back in scutes. Because of their sparse arrangement, it was unlikely that they served a significant role in defense. However, they may have played an important role in nutrient storage for titanosaurs living in highly seasonal climates and for female titanosaurs laying eggs. Osteoderms were present on both large and small species, so they were not solely used by smaller species as protection against predators. New evidence published in 2021 suggests there were indeed some defensive purposes in titanosaur osteoderms; simulated bite marks from both baurusuchid crocodylomorphs and abelisaurids on titanosaurid osteoderms suggest they could be useful for protecting the animals as well as functioning in mineral storage.

== Classification ==
- Shunosaurus
- - Mamenchisauridae
  - - Turiasauria
    - Neosauropoda
      - Diplodocoidea
        - Rebbachisauridae
        - - Dicraeosauridae
          - Diplodocidae
      - Macronaria
        - Camarasaurus
        - Titanosauriformes
          - Brachiosauridae
          - Somphospondyli
            - Euhelopodidae
            - Titanosauria

Phylogenetic position of Titanosauria within Eusauropoda

Titanosaurs are classified as sauropod dinosaurs. This highly diverse group forms the dominant clade of Cretaceous sauropods. Within Sauropoda, titanosaurs were once classified as close relatives of Diplodocidae due to their shared characteristic of narrow teeth, but this is now known to be the result of convergent evolution. Titanosaurs are now known to be most closely related to euhelopodids and brachiosaurids; together they form a clade named Titanosauriformes.

For much of the 20th century, most known species of titanosaurs were classified in the family Titanosauridae, which is no longer in widespread use. Titanosauria was first proposed in 1993 as a taxon to encompass titanosaurids and their close relatives. It has been phylogenetically defined as the clade composed of the most recent common ancestor of Saltasaurus and Andesaurus and all of its descendants. The relationships of species within Titanosauria remain largely unresolved, and it is considered one of the most poorly-understood areas of dinosaur classification. One of the few areas of agreement is that the majority of titanosaurs except Andesaurus and some other basal species form a clade called Lithostrotia, which some researchers consider equivalent to the deprecated Titanosauridae. Lithostrotians include titanosaurs such as Alamosaurus, Isisaurus, Malawisaurus, Rapetosaurus, and Saltasaurus.

=== Early history ===
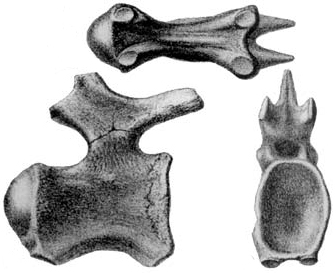
Lectotype of Titanosaurus indicus, the name-bearing genus of Titanosauria

Titanosaurus indicus was first named by British paleontologist Richard Lydekker in 1877, as a new taxon of dinosaur based on two caudals and a femur collected on different occasions at the same location in India. While it was later given a position as a sauropod within Cetiosauridae by Lydekker in 1888, he named the new sauropod family Titanosauridae for the genus in 1893, which included only Titanosaurus and Argyrosaurus, united by procoelous caudals, opisthocoelous presacrals, a lack of pleurocoels and open chevrons. Following this, Austro-Hungarian paleontologist Franz Nopcsa reviewed reptile genera in 1928, and provided a short classification of Sauropoda, where he placed the Titanosaurinae (a reranking of Lydekker's Titanosauridae) in Morosauridae, and included the genera Titanosaurus, Hypselosaurus and Macrurosaurus because they all had strongly procoelous caudals.

German paleontologist Friedrich von Huene provided a significant revision of Titanosauridae the following year in 1929, where he reviewed the dinosaurs of Cretaceous Argentina, and named multiple new genera. Huene included multiple species of Titanosaurus from India, England, France, Romania, Madagascar and Argentina, Hypselosaurus and Aepisaurus from France, Macrurosaurus from England, Alamosaurus from United States, and Argyrosaurus, Antarctosaurus, and Laplatasaurus from Argentina. The material between them represented almost all regions of the skeleton, which showed they were derived sauropods Huene interpreted as closest to Pleurocoelus of the various non-titanosaurid genera.

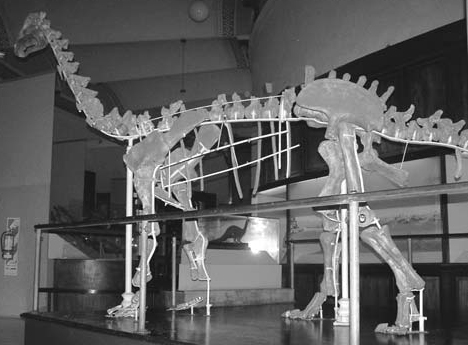
Skeletal mount of Neuquensaurus australis

For his 1986 thesis, Argentinian paleontologist Jaime Powell described and classified many new genera of South American titanosaurs. Using the family Titanosauridae to include them all, he grouped the genera into Titanosaurinae, Saltasaurinae, Antarctosaurinae, Argyrosaurinae and Titanosauridae indet. Titanosaurinae included Titanosaurus and the new genus Aeolosaurus, united by multiple features of the caudal vertebrae; the new clade Saltasaurinae was created to include Saltasaurus and the new genus Neuquensaurus, united by very distinct dorsals, caudals, and ilia; the new clade Antarctosaurinae was created to include Antarctosaurus, distinguished by large size, a different form of braincase, more elongate girdle bones, and more robust limb bones; and Argyrosaurinae was created for Argyrosaurus, bearing a more robust forelimb and hand and more primitive dorsals. The new genus Epachthosaurus was named for a more basal titanosaurid classified as Titanosauridae indet al.ong with unnamed specimens, Clasmodosaurus and Campylodoniscus.

John Stanton McIntosh provided a synopsis of sauropod relationships in 1990, using Titanosauridae as the group to contain all taxa like previous authors. Opisthocoelicaudia was placed in Opisthocoelicaudiinae within Camarasauridae, following its original description and not later works, and Nemegtosaurus and Quaesitosaurus were placed within Dicraeosaurinae. Titanosauridae included many previously named genera, plus taxa like Tornieria and Janenschia. Saltasaurus included the species previously known as Titanosaurus australis and T. robustus, which were named Neuquensaurus by Powell in 1986. McIntosh provided a large diagnosis of the family: "dorsals with irregularly shaped pleurocoels and spines directed strongly backward; transverse processes directed dorsally as well as laterally, very robust in shoulder region; a second dorsosacral, its rib fused to ilium; caudals strongly procoelous with a prominent ball on distal end of centrum throughout tail; caudal arches on front half of centrum; sternal plates large; preacetabular process of ilium swept outward to become almost horizontal", but stressed that the relationships of titanosaurids to other sauropod groups couldn't be determined due to a lack of cranial material.

A brief review of putative titanosaurids from Europe was authored by Jean Le Loeuff in 1993, and covered the supposed genera known so far. The Barremian (middle Early Cretaceous) species Titanosaurus valdensis, named decades previous by Huene, was kept as the oldest of the titanosaurid and given the new genus name Iuticosaurus. The French taxon Aepisaurus was removed from the family and placed in undetermined Sauropoda. Macrurosaurus was considered a chimaera of titanosaurid and non-titanosaurid material because of the presence of both procoelous and amphicoelous caudals. Huene's species Titanosaurus lydekkeri was left as a nomen dubium, but left within Titanosauridae. Maastrichtian fossils from France and Spain were removed from Hypselosaurus and Titanosaurus, with Hypselosaurus being declared dubious like T. lydekkeri. The variety of Romanian fossils named as Magyarosaurus by Huene were also moved into the same species again, M. dacus as originally named by Nopcsa.

=== Titanosauria named ===
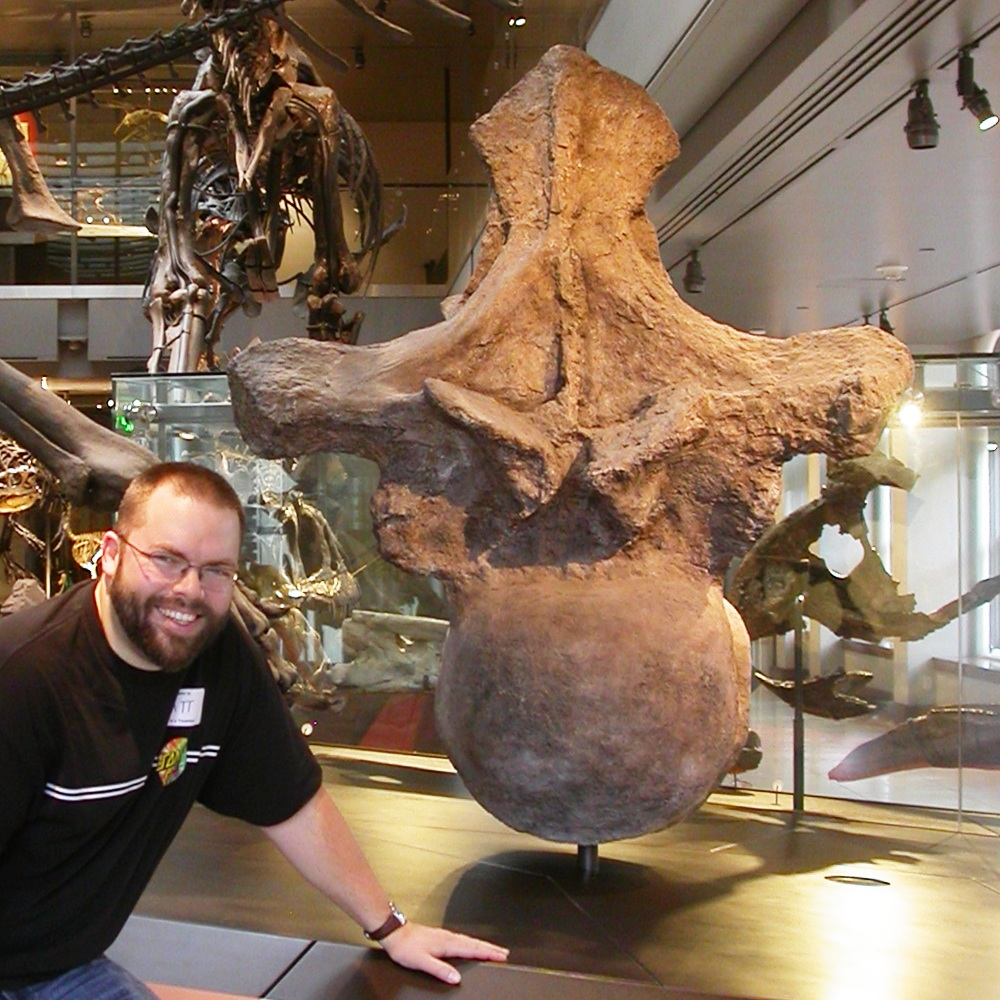
Argentinosaurus dorsal and sauropod paleontologist Matt Wedel

José Bonaparte and Rodolfo Coria in 1993 concluded that a new clade of derived sauropods was necessary because Argentinosaurus, Andesaurus and Epachthosaurus were distinct from Titanosauridae as they possessed hyposphene-hypantrum articulations, but were still very closely related to the titanosaurids. The taxa that possessed the articulations were united within the new family Andesauridae, and the two families were grouped together within the new clade Titanosauria. The titanosaurs were diagnosed by possessing small pleurocoels centered within an anteroposteriorly elongate depression and the presence of two well defined depressions on the posterior face of the neural arch. The entire group was compared favourably with cetiosaurids like Patagosaurus and Volkheimeria.

Overlooking the naming of Titanosauria, Paul Upchurch in 1995 named the clade Titanosauroidea, to include Opisthocoelicaudia and the more derived Titanosauridae (Malawisaurus, Alamosaurus and Saltasaurus). United by: caudals with anteriorly-shifted neural spines, extremely robust forearm bones, a prominent concavity on the ulna for articulation with the humerus, a laterally flared and flattened ilium, and a less robust pubis; Upchurch considered the clade sister taxon to Diplodocoidea, because of their shared dental anatomy, although he noted that peg-like teeth might have been independently evolved. This was followed up by Upchurch's 1998 study on sauropod phylogenetics, which additionally recovered Phuwiangosaurus and Andesaurus within Titanosauroidea and resolved Opisthocoelicaudia as the sister of Saltasaurus instead of the most basal titanosauroid. This result places Titanosauroidea in a group with Camarasaurus and Brachiosaurus, although Nemegtosauridae (Nemegtosaurus and Quaesitosaurus) was still classified as the basalmost family of diplodocoids. Upchurch chose to use Titanosauroidea as a replacement name for Titanosauria due to the recommended use of Linnean taxonomy and ranks.

In 1997, Leonardo Salgado et al. published a phylogenetic study on Titanosauriformes, including relationships within Titanosauria. They provided a definition for the clade of "including the most recent common ancestor of Andesaurus delgadoi and Titanosauridae and all of its descendants". Titanosauria resolved including the same two subclades as Bonaparte & Coria (1993), where Andesauridae was monotypic, only including the name genus, and Titanosauridae was all other titanosaurs. Titanosauria was additionally rediagnosed, with eye-shaped pleurocoels, forked infradiapophyseal laminae, centro-parapophyseal laminae, procoelous anterior caudals, and a significantly longer pubis than ischium. Titanosauridae was less strongly defined because of the polytomy between Malawisaurus and Epachthosaurus, so some diagnostic features couldn't be resolved. Saltasaurinae was defined as the most recent ancestor of Neuquensaurus, Saltasaurus and its descendants, and diagnosed by short cervical prezygapophyses, vertically compressed anterior caudals, and a posteriorly shifted anterior caudal neural spine.

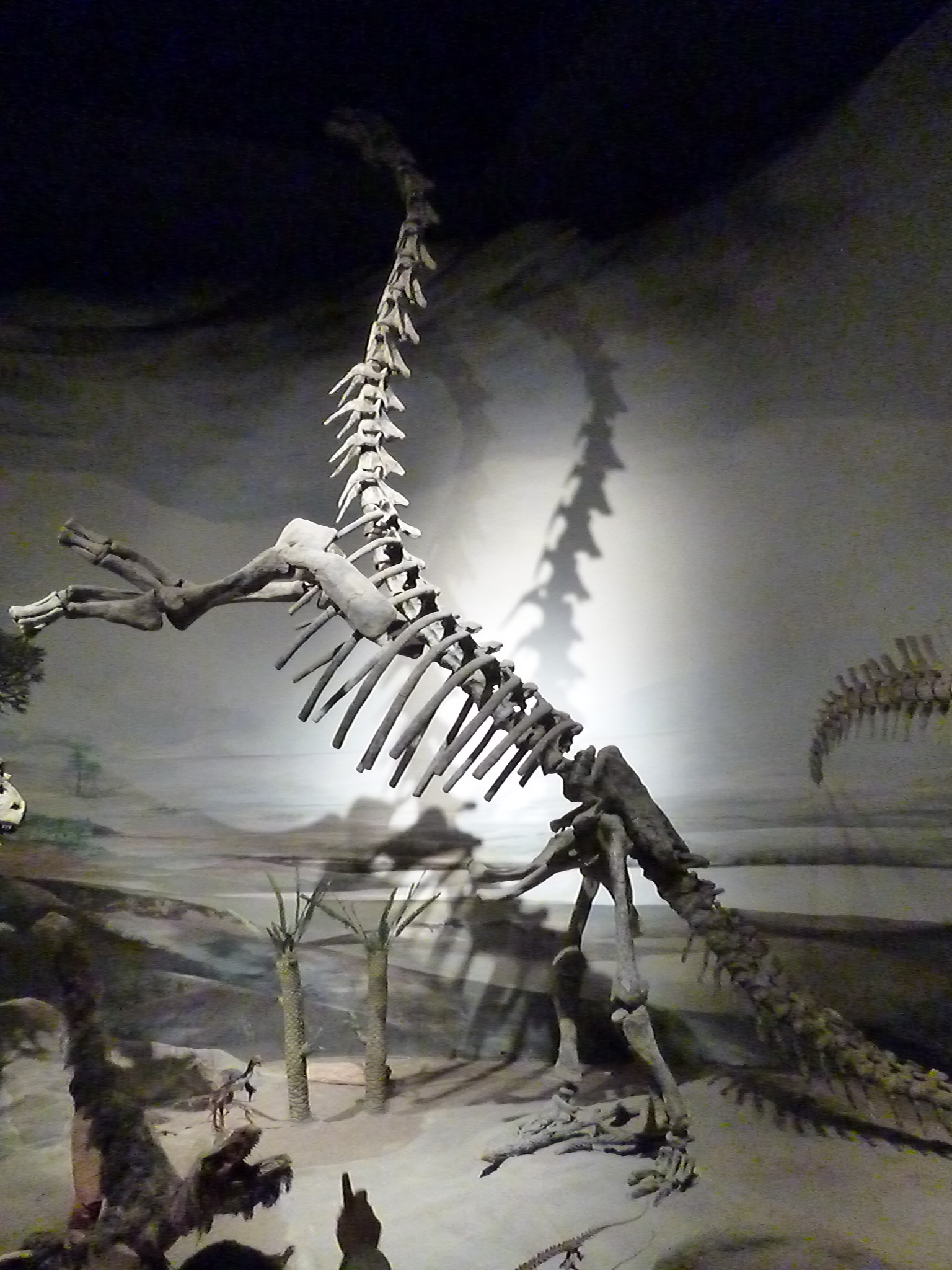
Mounted rearing skeleton of Epachthosaurus

- Titanosauria
  - Andesaurus
  - Titanosauridae
    - Malawisaurus
    - Epachthosaurus
    - - - Argentinosaurus
        - - Opisthocoelicaudia
          - Trigonosaurus (="Titanosaurinae indet. DGM Serie B")
      - - Aeolosaurus
        - - Alamosaurus
          - Saltasaurinae
            - Neuquensaurus
            - Saltasaurus

Contributing additional work to the systematics of titanosaurs, Spanish paleontologist José Sanz et al. published an additional study in 1999, utilizing both the names Titanosauria and Titanosauroidea in displaying their results. Similar to Upchurch (1995), Sanz et al. recovered Opisthocoelicaudia as a titanosauroid outside Titanosauria, while Titanosauria was redefined to include only the taxa classified by their study. Eutitanosauria was proposed as a name for the titanosaurs more derived than Epachthosaurus, and noted the presence of osteoderms as a probable synapomorphy of this clade. Aeolosaurus, Alamosaurus, Ampelosaurus and Magyarosaurus were looked at using their character list, but were considered too incomplete to add to the final study.

Argentinian paleontologist Jaime Powell published his 1986 thesis in 2003, with revisions to bring his old work up to date, including the addition of more phylogenetics and the recognition of Titanosauria as a clade name. Using the datamatrix of Sanz et al. (1999) and modifying it to include additional taxa and some character changes, Powell found that titanosaurs formed mostly a single gradual radiation beginning with Epachthosaurus as the most basal titanosaur, and Ampelosaurus and Isisaurus as the most derived. Titanosauroidea (following Upchurch 1995), was distinguished by pre- and post-spinal laminae in anterior caudals, a laterally flared ilium, a lateral expansion of the upper femur, and strongly opisthocoelous posterior dorsals. Less inclusive, Titanosauria was diagnosed by horizontally facing dorsal diapophyses, prominent procoelous anterior caudals, and a ridge on the sternal plates. Within Titanosauria, Eutitanosauria was characterized by the absence of a hyposphene-hypantrum, no femoral fourth trochanter, and osteoderms. A small clade of Alamosaurus, Lirainosaurus and the "Peirópolis titanosaur" (Trigonosaurus) was resolved, and diagnosed by only a rotation of the tibia so the proximal end is perpendicular to the distal end. More derived clades, while resolved, were only weakly supported, or characterized by reversions of diagnostic traits of larger groups (below and left).

Powell (2003)

- Titanosauroidea
  - Opisthocoelicaudia
  - Titanosauria
    - Epachthosaurus
    - Eutitanosauria
      - - Alamosaurus
        - Lirainosaurus
        - Trigonosaurus (="Peirópolis titanosaur")
      - - Aeolosaurus
        - - Saltasaurus
          - - Argyrosaurus
            - - Isisaurus (=Titanosaurus colberti)
              - Ampelosaurus

Curry-Rogers & Forster (2001)

- Titanosauria
  - - Jainosaurus (=Antarctosaurus septentrionalis)
    - - Malawisaurus
      - - Quaesitosaurus
        - - Rapetosaurus
          - Nemegtosaurus
  - Saltasaurinae
    - Alamosaurus
    - Isisaurus (=Titanosaurus colberti)
    - - Opisthocoelicaudia
      - - Neuquensaurus
        - Saltasaurus

Rapetosaurus was described in 2001 by Kristina Curry-Rogers and Catherine Forster, who additionally provided a new phylogenetic analysis of Titanosauriformes (above and right). Titanosauria was strongly supported, distinguished by up to 20 characters depending on unknown traits in basal taxa. Similarly, Saltasaurinae was characterised by up to 16 traits, and the clade of Rapetosaurus and related taxa possessed four unique features. Nemegtosaurus and Quaesitosaurus were resolved within Titanosauria for the first time, after being placed in Diplodocoidea by multiple other analyses, because Rapetosaurus provided the first significant titanosaur cranial material with associated postcrania. All three genera were resolved in a clade together, although Curry-Rogers & Forster noted that it was possible the group was only resolved because no other titanosaurs had comparable cranial material. Opisthocoelicaudia was also nested deeply in Saltasaurinae, though a further investigation of titanosaur interrelationships was proposed.

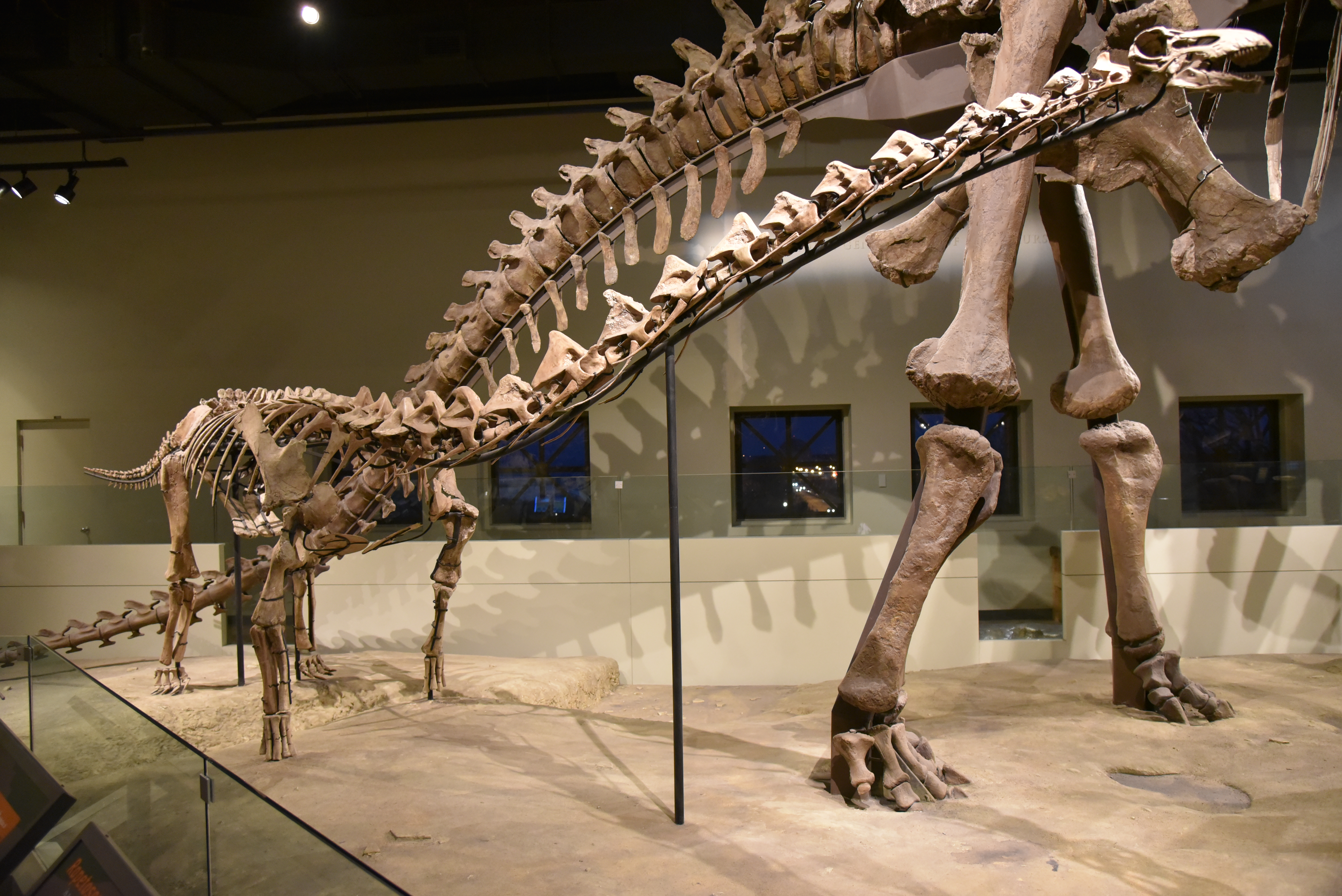
Mounted skeleton of a juvenile Rapetosaurus

American paleontologist Jeff Wilson presented another revision of overall sauropod phylogeny in 2002, resolving strong support for most groups, and a similar result to Upchurch (1998) although with Euhelopus closest to titanosaurs instead of outside Neosauropoda. More internal clades were resolved for Titanosauria, with Nemegtosaurus and Rapetosaurus united within Nemegtosauridae, and Saltasauridae including two subfamilies, Opisthocoelicaudiinae and Saltasaurinae. Saltasauridae was defined as a node-stem triplet, where everything descended from the common ancestor of Opisthocoelicaudia and Saltasaurus was within Saltasauridae, and the subfamilies Saltasaurinae and Opisthocoelicaudiinae were for every taxon on one branch of the saltasaurid tree or the other.

Wilson and Paul Upchurch followed this study up in 2003 with a significant revision of the type genus Titanosaurus, and revisited all the material that had been assigned to the genus while reviewing titanosaur inter-relationships. Because they found Titanosaurus to be a dubious name, they proposed that Linnaean-named groups Titanosauridae and Titanosauroidea should be considered invalid as well. Wilson & Upchurch (2003) supported the definition of Salgado et al. (1997) for Titanosauria, since it was oldest and most similar to the original content of the group when named by Bonaparte & Coria (1993). Lithostrotia (Upchurch et al. 2004) was defined to be Malawisaurus and all more derived titanosaurs, and the clade Eutitanosauria (Sanz et al. 1999) was considered a possible synonym of Saltasauridae. Wilson & Upchurch (2003) presented a reduced cladogram of Titanosauria, including only the most commonly-analyzed taxa from previous studies, resulting in a tree similar to that of Wilson (2002) but with Rapetosaurus and Nemegtosaurus excluded and Epachthosaurus included. Alamosaurus and Opisthocoelicaudia were united within Opisthocoelicaudiinae, Neuquensaurus and Saltasaurus formed Saltasaurinae, and Isisaurus placed as the next most derived titanosaurid.

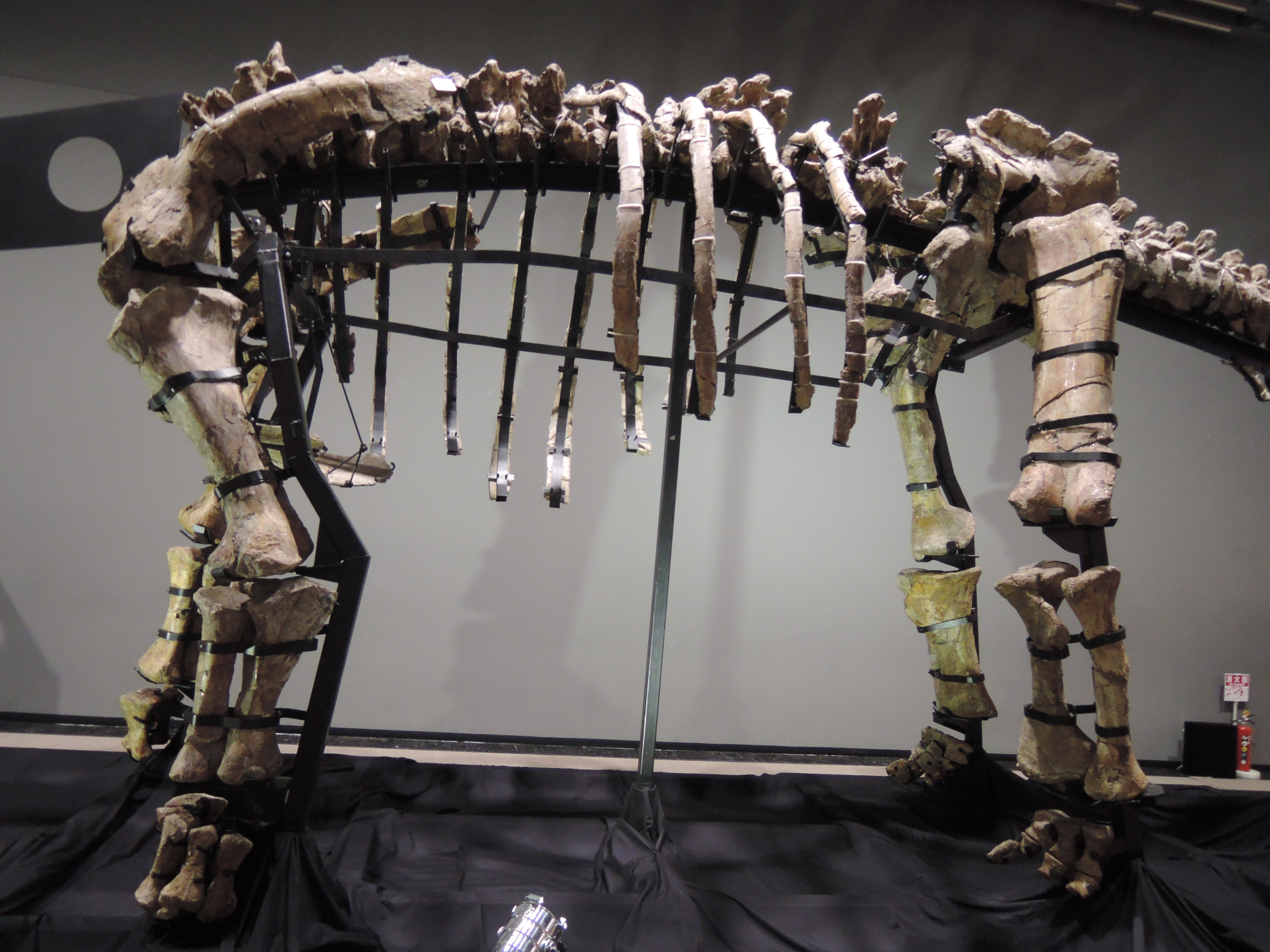
Holotype skeleton of Opisthocoelicaudia

At the same time as Wilson & Upchurch redescribing the species of Titanosaurus, Saldago (2003) looked over the potential invalidity of the family Titanosauridae and redefined the internal clades of Titanosauria. Titanosauria was defined as more inclusive than Titanosauroidea, contrasting with earlier used by Upchurch (1995) and Sanz et al. (1999), as all taxa in Somphospondyli closer to Saltasaurus than Euhelopus. In order to create additional stability, Saldago also defined Andesauroidea for only Andesaurus, as every titanosaur closer to that genus than Saltasaurus, and also it's opposite Titanosauroidea as every titanosaur closer to Saltasaurus than Andesaurus. Next most inclusive, Salgado revitalised Titanosauridae to include everything descended from the ancestor of Epachthosaurus and Saltasaurus, and to replace the node-stem triplet of Saltasauridae, defined the clades Epachthosaurinae and Eutitanosauria as Epachthosaurus>Saltasaurus and Saltasaurus<Epachthosaurus respectively. Saltasaurinae and Opisthocoelicaudiinae were retained with their original definitions, but Lithostrotia was considered a synonym of Titanosauridae, and Titanosaurinae was considered a paraphyletic clade of unrelated titanosaurids.

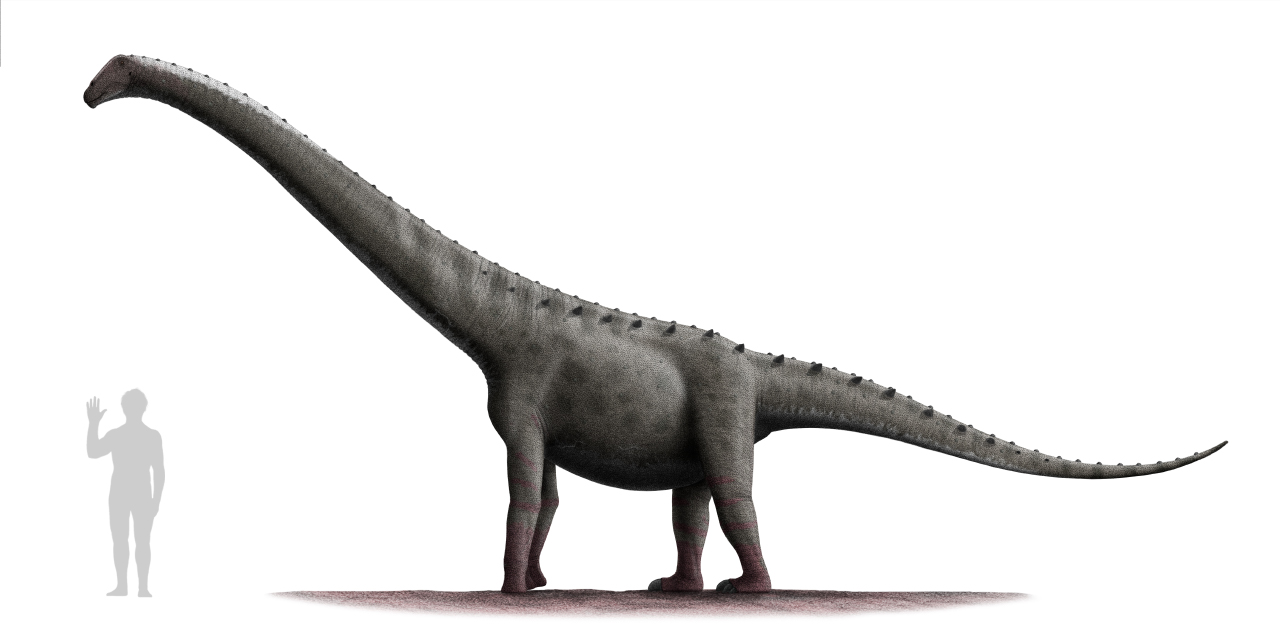
Life restoration of Rinconsaurus, a derived titanosaur possessing unique caudals that significantly change articular surfaces throughout the tail

Following the clade definitions proposed in previous Salgado studies, Bernardo González-Riga published two papers in 2003 describing new taxa in Titanosauria: Mendozasaurus, and Rinconsaurus (with Jorge O. Calvo). In both studies, the new taxa formed clades within Titanosauridae, although neither were named, and new diagnostic features were proposed for the family. For Mendozasaurus, the new genus grouped with Malawisaurus as basal within Titanosauridae, but because of the features of caudal vertebrae in these basal taxa, González-Riga recommended revising the diagnosis of the family, instead of changing the content. The situation of caudals in Rinconsaurus also suggested procoelous caudals were no longer diagnostic, because in the tail of Rinconsaurus the vertebrae regularly changed their articular surfaces, being from procoelous caudals interspersed with amphicoelous, opisthocoelous and biconvex vertebrae. Rinconsaurus was then included in Aeolosaurini, a clade named the following year by Aldirene Franco-Rosas et al. containing everything closer to Aeolosaurus and Gondwanatitan than Saltasaurus or Opisthocoelicaudia. Only the three genera and various intermediate specimens were included in Aeolosaurini in their 2004 paper, with the tribe being considered to be within Saltasaurinae.

The second edition of The Dinosauria, published in 2004, included newly described titanosaurs and other taxa reidentified as titanosaurs. Written by Upchurch, Paul Barrett and Peter Dodson, a review of Sauropoda included a more expansive Titanosauria for sauropods more derived than brachiosaurids. Titanosauria, defined as everything closer to Saltasaurus than Brachiosaurus, included a very large variety of taxa, and the new clade Lithostrotia was named for a large number of more derived taxa, although Nemegtosauridae was placed in Diplodocoidea following earlier publications of Upchurch. Lithostrotia adopted the distinguishing feature of strongly procoelous caudals, previously used for Titanosauria.

=== New phylogenetic frameworks ===
In 2005, Curry-Rogers proposed a new phylogenetic analysis that focused on the inter-relationships of Titanosauria and included the most expansive character and taxon list of any study before it. 364 characters were selected from all previous phylogenetic analyses and scored across 29 probable titanosaurs, ranging from the Late Jurassic African Janenschia to the large variety of Late Cretaceous global genera. Proposing her analysis as the basis for a new phylogenetic framework of Titanosauria, Curry-Rogers recommended only using named for clades that were very strongly supported. For the strict consensus, every taxon more derived than Brachiosaurus was in an unresolved polytomy except for a clade of Rapetosaurus and Nemegtosaurus, and one of Saltasaurinae. Within the recommended results, she only named Titanosauria, Lithostrotia, Saltasauridae, Saltasaurinae and Opisthocoelicaudiinae, because of the weakness of support (below and left).

Curry-Rogers (2005)

- Titanosauria
  - Andesaurus
  - Phuwiangosaurus
  - - - Paralititan
      - Argyrosaurus
    - - - Janenschia
        - Aeolosaurus
      - Saltasauridae
        - "Santa Rosa indet."
        - - Opisthocoelicaudiinae
            - Isisaurus
            - - Alamosaurus
              - - Argentinosaurus
                - Antarctosaurus
                - Opisthocoelicaudia
        - - Aegyptosaurus
          - Lithostrotia
            - Epachthosaurus
            - - - Ampelosaurus
                - - Magyarosaurus
                  - - Agustinia
                    - Trigonosaurus (="Brazil Series B")
                    - - Malawisaurus
                      - - Rapetosaurus
                        - Nemegtosaurus
              - - Saltasaurinae
                  - Lirainosaurus
                  - - Rocasaurus
                    - "Jabalpur indet."
                    - - Quaesitosaurus
                      - "Malagasy Taxon B"
                      - - Neuquensaurus
                        - Saltasaurus

Carballido et al. (2017)

- Titanosauria
  - Andesaurus
  - Wintonotitan
  - - - Malarguesaurus
      - Ruyangosaurus
    - - Epachthosaurus
      - Eu-
        - - - Rinconsauria
              - Rinconsaurus
              - - Muyelensaurus
                - - Overosaurus
                  - Aeolosaurus maximus
          - - Bonitasaura
            - - Notocolossus
              - Lognkosauria
                - Mendozasaurus
                - - - Quetecsaurus
                    - Futalognkosaurus
                  - - Puertasaurus
                    - Drusilasaura
                    - - Argentinosaurus
                      - Patagotitan
        - - Dreadnoughtus
          - Lithostrotia
            - Malawisaurus
            - - Baurutitan
              - - - Rapetosaurus
                  - - Tapuiasaurus
                    - Isisaurus
                - - Alamosaurus
                  - Saltasauridae
                    - Opisthocoelicaudia
                    - -inae
                      - Neuquensaurus
                      - Saltasaurus

Another form of composite matrix was created by Calvo, González-Riga and Juan Porfiri in 2007, based upon multiple previous studies between 1997 and 2003. The final analysis included 15 titanosaurs and 65 characters, and the typical titanosaur subclades were resolved, Titanosauridae being used over Lithostrotia following Salgado (2003), and the new clade Rinconsauria for the clade of Rinconsaurus and Muyelensaurus. The new clade (defined as Rinconsaurus and Muyelensaurus) was placed as the sister taxon of Aeolosaurini, which together grouped with Rapetosaurus as sister to Saltasauridae. In the same year, Calvo et al. published another paper, describing the basal titanosaur Futalognkosaurus. The only difference in the resulting phylogeny, based on the matrix of the Calvo, González-Riga & Porfiri (2007), was the addition of Futalognkosaurus as the sister taxon to Mendozasaurus in a clade Calvo et al. named Lognkosauria, defined by the two genera classified within it. A very similar result was also recovered by González-Riga et al. in 2009 in a phylogenetic analysis based partially on that of Calvo et al. (2007), although Epachthosaurus was nested with Rapetosaurus outside the clades of aeolosaurines. Further updates and modifications were then made by Palbo Gallina & Apesteguía in 2011, with the additions of Ligabuesaurus, Antarctosaurus, Nemegtosaurus and Bonitasaura and character updates to match, bringing the total to 77 characters and 22 taxa. Significantly contrasting the earlier results, internal relationships of Titanosauria were rearranged. Malawisaurus nested with Andesaurus in a clade of the basalmost titanosaurs outside Titanosauroidea, where Lirainosaurus, instead of being the basal member of the saltasaur-branch was instead basalmost titanosauroid. Lognkosauria moved to be within rinconsaurs, while Nemegtosauridae was resolved as the sister of Aeolosaurus and Gondwanatitan, and the rinconsaur-lognkosaur branch. Antarctosaurus was unstable, but placed in a polytomy with the lognkosaurs and rinconsaurs before being excluded. Saltasaurinae and its relationship with Opisthocoelicaudia remained the same.

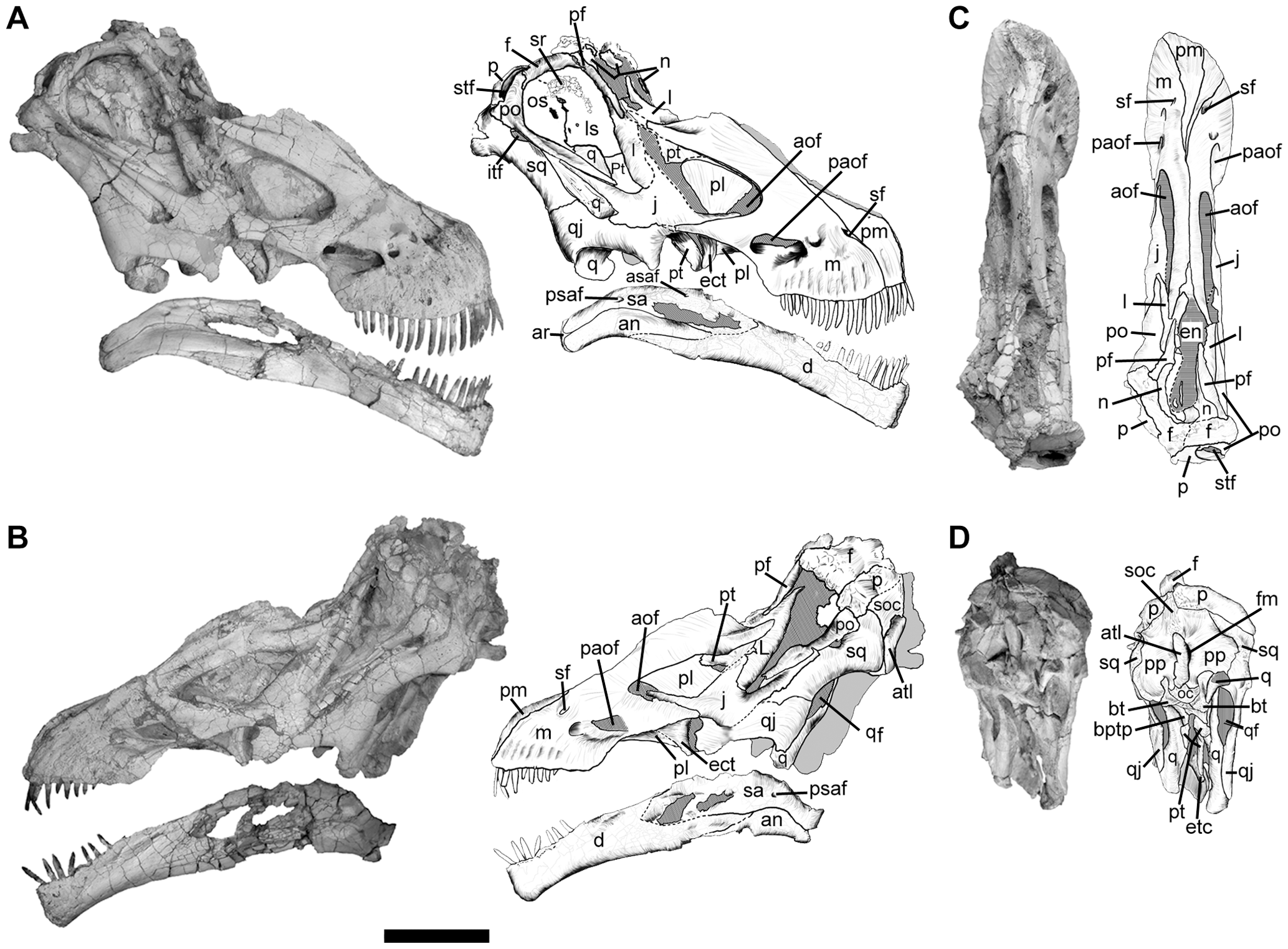
Skull of Tapuiasaurus macedoi

Nemegtosauridae was additionally revised by Hussam Zaher et al. (2011) with the description of Tapuiasaurus, which nested closer to Rapetosaurus than Nemegtosaurus, with all three forming a clade of derived lithostrotians. Using the matrix of Wilson (2002), following the additions of a few cranial characters and Diamantinasaurus, Tangvayosaurus and Phuwiangosaurus, remained the same as originally found by Wilson but with Diamantinasaurus sister to Saltasauridae and the other two genera as basal titanosaurs outside Lithostrotia, since Titanosauria, while undefined, was labelled to include all taxa closer to Saltasaurus than Euhelopus. Following a revision of the skull of Tapuiasaurus, Wilson et al. (2016) rescored the analysis of Zaher et al. and recovered similar results for everything but Nemegtosauridae, where the family dissolved into a more basal Tapuiasaurus outside Lithostrota and Nemegtosaurus outside Saltasauridae. While non-titanosaur phylogeny remained identical in every single result, the topology within Titanosauria was very labile and prone to change with minor adjustments.

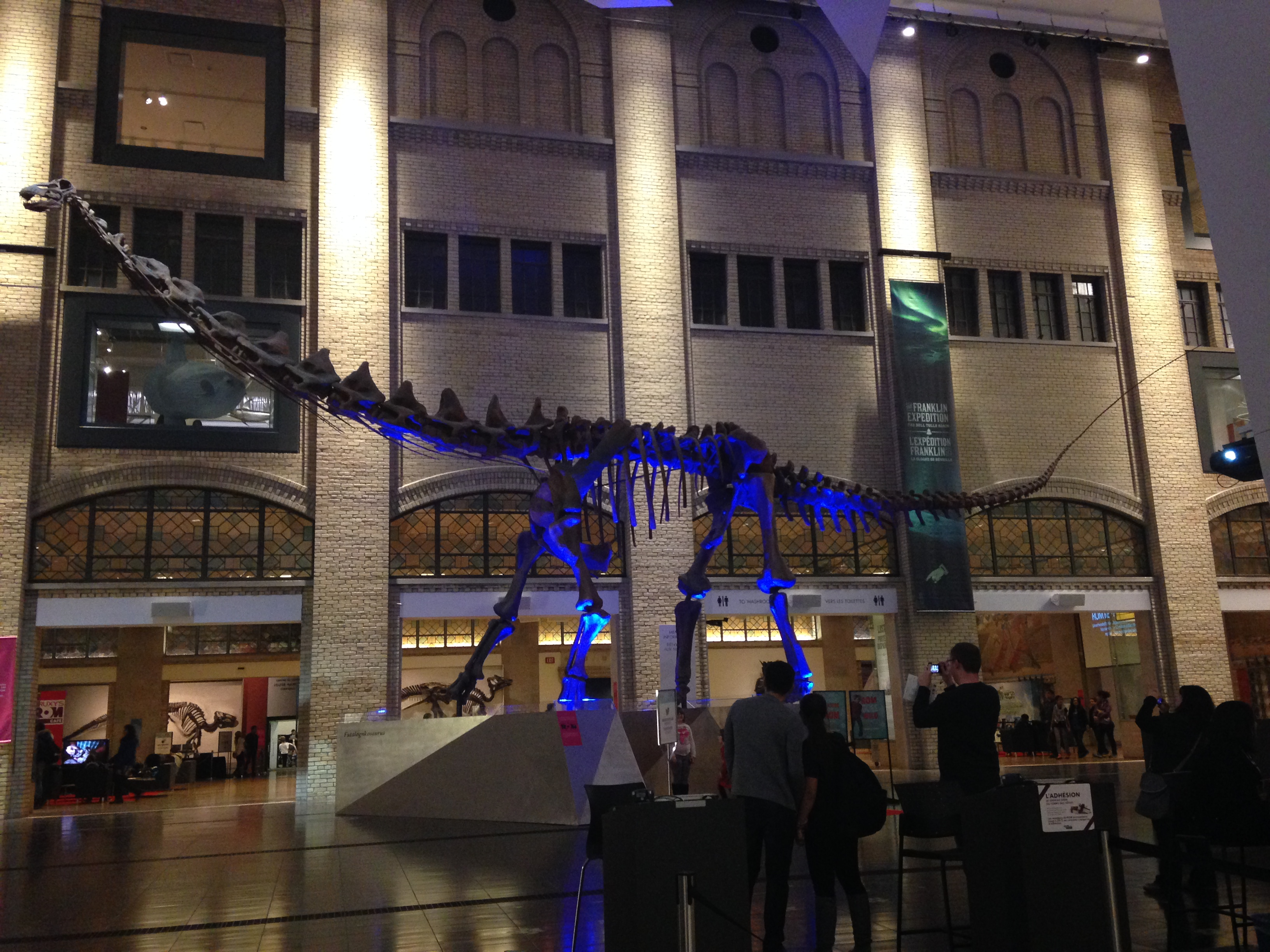
Mounted replica skeleton of Futalognkosaurus dukei, Royal Ontario Museum

Also following the 2002 analysis of Wilson, José Carballido and colleagues published a redescription of Chubutisaurus in 2011, and utilized an updated Wilson matrix, expanded to 289 characters across 41 taxa, including 15 titanosaurs. The primary focus of the analysis was on the basal titanosauriform taxa, but Titanosauria was defined, as the most recent common ancestor of Andesaurus delgadoi and Saltasaurus loricatus, and all its descendants, although the only autapomorphy of the group recovered was the absence of a prominent ventral process on the scapula. This same matrix and basis of characters was further utilized and expanded for analyses on Tehuelchesaurus, Comahuesaurus and related rebbachisaurs, Europasaurus, and Padillasaurus, before being expanded upon once again in 2017 by Carballido et al. during the description of Patagotitan to 405 characters and 87 taxa, including 28 titanosaurs (above and right). The definition of Titanosauria was preserved following Salgado et al. (1997) as Andesaurus plus Saltasaurus. Eutitanosauria (closer to Saltasaurus than Epachthosaurus) was resolved as a very inclusive clade composed of two distinct branches, one leading to the larger-bodied lognkosaurs and the other to the smaller-bodied saltasaurs. On the lognkosaur branch of Eutitanosauria, there is a branch of lognkosaurs and one of Rinconsauria. Following Calvo, González-Riga and Porfiri (2007), Rinconsauria was defined as Muyelensaurus plus Rinconsaurus, and Lognkosauria was defined as Mendozasaurus plus Futalognkosaurus. Rinconsauria included taxa typically found within Aeolosaurini as well, so Aeolosaurini was redefined as Aeolosaurus rionegrinus plus Gondwanatitan to preserve the original restricted content, otherwise the entire rinconsaur-lognkosaur branch would be classified within Aeolosaurini. Lithostrotia, Saltasauridae and Saltasaurinae had their definitions preserved from earlier studies, and included their typical content.

Philip Mannion and colleagues redescribed Lusotitan in 2013, creating a new analysis of 279 characters drawn from significant previous analyses by Upchurch and Wilson supplemented by other studies. 63 sauropods were included, focusing on non-titanosaurian sauropods, although 14 probable titanosaurs were included. Unique to Mannion et al., continuous characters were distinguished in a run of the matrix, which resolved almost all of Somphospondyli within Titanosauria because of Andesaurus placing very basal in a large group of Andesauroidea. Titanosauroidea was tentatively retained as the opposite clade of titanosaurs, which included all other traditional titanosaurs, although it was noted because of the invalidity of Titanosaurus, Titanosauroidea should be considered an invalid name as well. While the original analysis didn't focus on titanosaurs, it was utilised during the descriptions of Savannasaurus and Diamantinasaurus, Yongjinglong, an osteology of Mendozasaurus, and redescribing Tendaguria. From these updates, an analysis of 548 characters and 124 taxa was published by Mannion et al. in 2019 for a redescription of Jiangshanosaurus and Dongyangosaurus, and additional revisions of Ruyangosaurus were made. No differentiation between continuous and discrete characters was made like performed by Mannion et al. (2013), but a large clade of Andesauroidea was still resolved with implied weights. Both redescribed Asian taxa, as well as Yongjinglong, previously considered derived titanosaurs related to Saltasauridae, were removed to outside the clade.

- Titanosauria
  - Andesaurus
  - - Ruyangosaurus
    - - - Daxiatitan
        - Xianshanosaurus
      - Lithostrotia
        - Malawisaurus
        - - - - Tapuiasaurus
              - Nemegtosaurus
            - - - Aeolosaurus
                - Rapetosaurus
              - - Alamosaurus
                - - Isisaurus
                  - - Saltasaurus
                    - - Opisthocoelicaudia
                      - - Savannasaurus
                        - Diamantinasaurus
          - - Epachthosaurus
            - - - - Muyelensaurus
                  - Rinconsaurus
                - - Pitekunsaurus
                  - - Antarctosaurus
                    - - Jainosaurus
                      - Vahiny
              - - Normanniasaurus
                - - Lognkosauria
                    - Argentinosaurus
                    - Futalognkosaurus
                    - Mendozasaurus
                    - - Notocolossus
                      - Patagotitan
                      - Puertasaurus

In the description of Mansourasaurus, Sallam et al. (2017) published a phylogenetic analysis of Titanosauria including the most taxa of any analysis of the clade. In an updated version of the analysis, with the taxon Mnyamawamtuka added, Gorscak & O'Connor (2019) got similar results, with slightly different relationships within small clades.

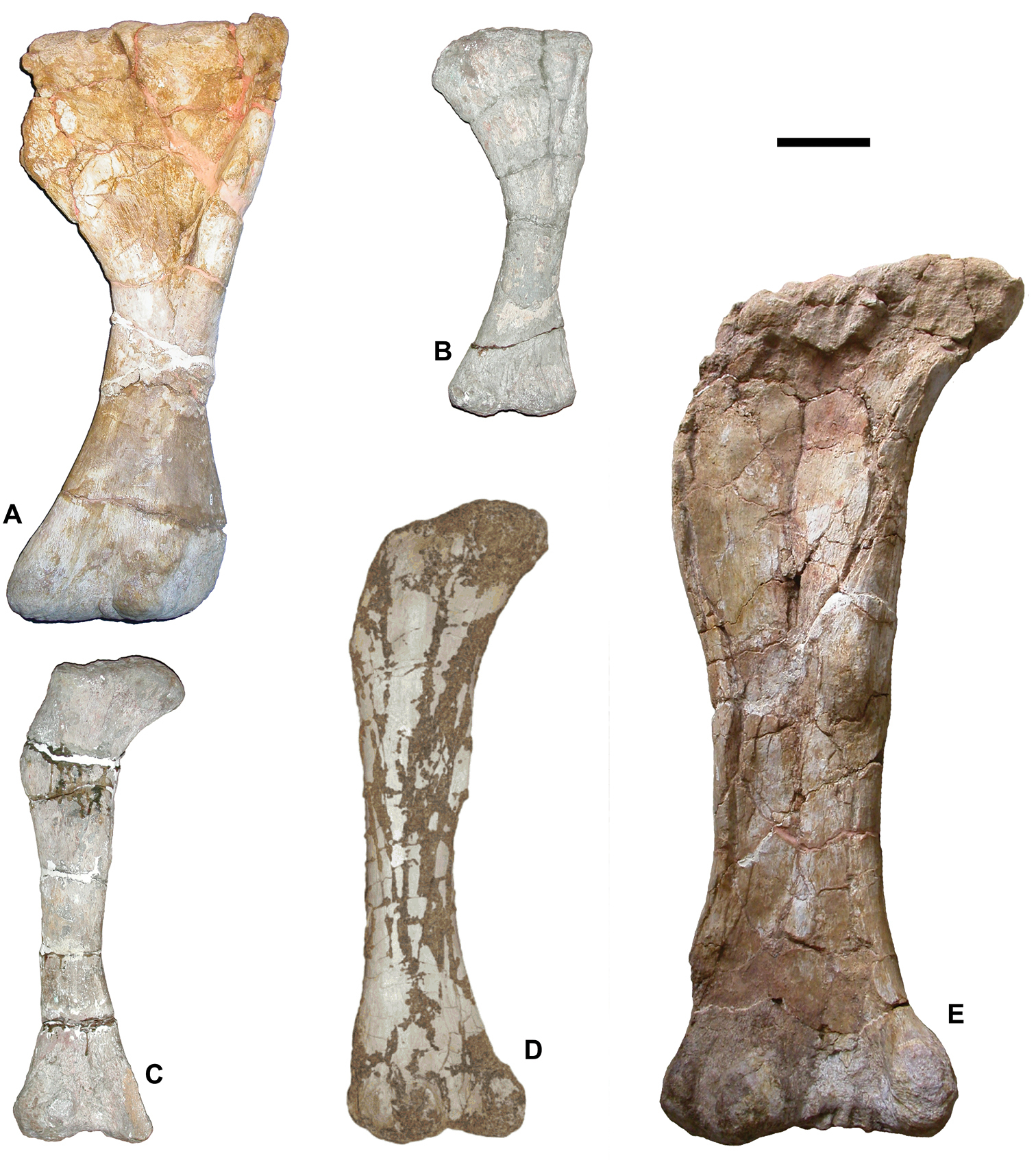
Humerus of Ampelosaurus (left) and Magyarosaurus (right), and femora of (left to right) Magyarosaurus, Lirainosaurus and Ampelosaurus

- Titanosauria
  - - Karongasaurus
    - - - Argentinosaurus
        - - Andesaurus
          - Ligabuesaurus
      - - Jiangshanosaurus
        - - - Angolatitan
            - Malarguesaurus
          - - Chubutisaurus
            - Wintonotitan
  - - Tastavinsaurus
    - Lithostrotia
      - - Malawisaurus
        - Mnyamawamtuka
      - - Tapuiasaurus
        - - Normanniasaurus
          - - - - Rinconsaurus
                - - Isisaurus
                  - Rapetosaurus
              - - Muyelensaurus
                - - Bonitasaura
                  - - Gondwanatitan
                    - - - Panamericansaurus
                        - - Overosaurus
                          - Shingopana
                      - - Trigonosaurus
                        - - Aeolosaurus
                          - Argyrosaurus
            - - Diamantinasaurus
              - - Patagotitan
                - Saltasauridae
                  - - Paralititan
                    - - Maxakalisaurus
                      - - Neuquensaurus
                        - Saltasaurus
                  - - - Epachthosaurus
                      - - Futalognkosaurus
                        - - Mendozasaurus
                          - - Atsinganosaurus
                            - Notocolossus
                    - - Rukwatitan
                      - - - Lohuecotitan
                          - Nemegtosaurus
                        - - - Lirainosaurus
                            - Opisthocoelicaudia
                          - - - Ampelosaurus
                              - - Mansourasaurus
                                - Paludititan
                            - - Pellegrinisaurus
                              - - Dreadnoughtus
                                - - Alamosaurus
                                  - Baurutitan

== Paleobiology ==
=== Diet ===
Fossilized dung associated with late Cretaceous titanosaurids from India has revealed phytoliths, silicified plant fragments, that offer clues to a broad, unselective plant diet. Besides the plant remains that might have been expected, such as cycads and conifers, discoveries published in 2005 revealed an unexpectedly wide range of monocotyledons, including palms and grasses (Poaceae), including ancestors of rice and bamboo, which has given rise to speculation that herbivorous dinosaurs and grasses co-evolved.

=== Nesting ===
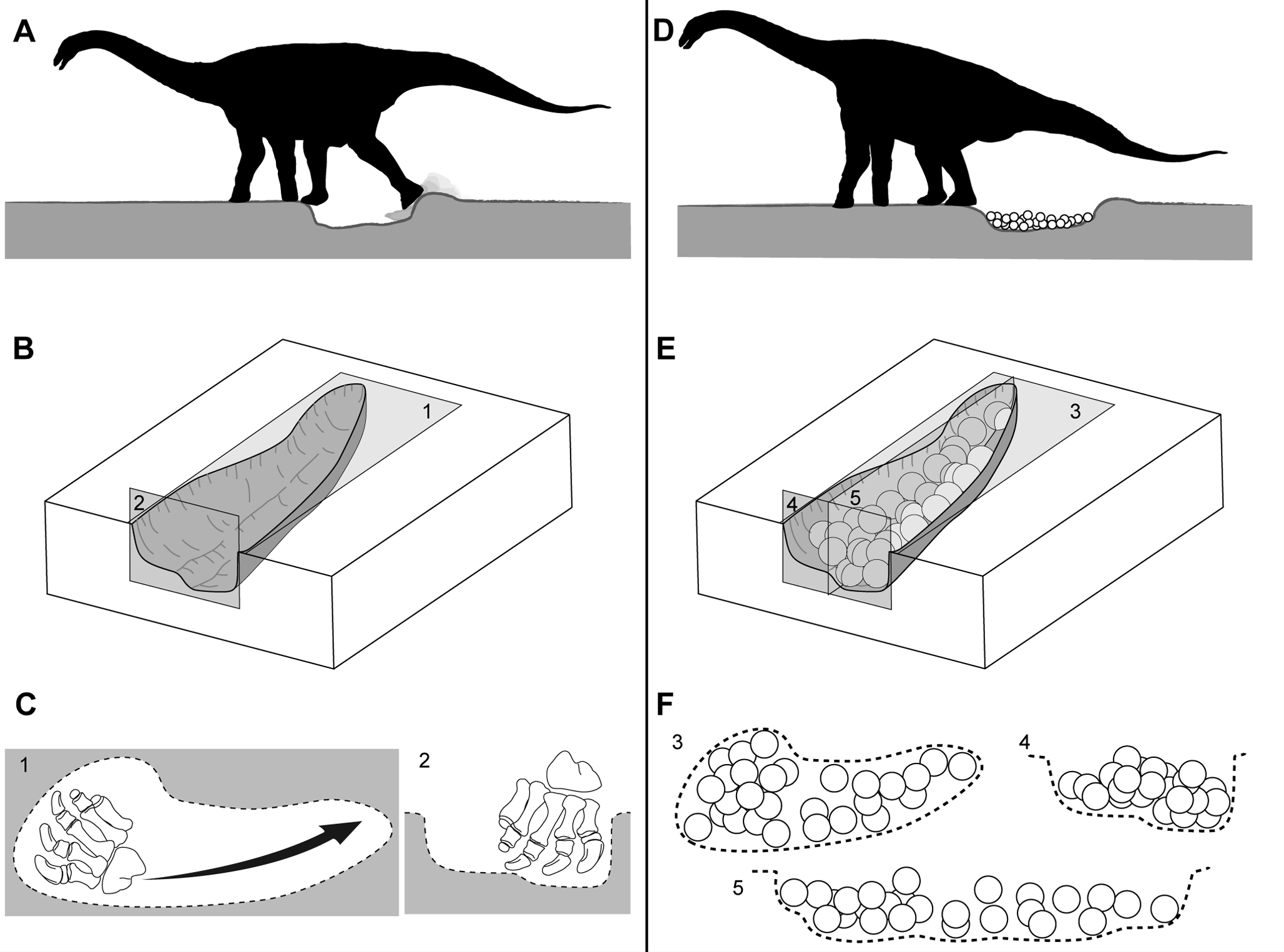
Diagram showing titanosaur nest excavation and egg laying

A large titanosaurid nesting ground was discovered in Auca Mahuevo, in Patagonia, Argentina and another colony has reportedly been discovered in Spain. Several hundred female saltasaurs dug holes with their back feet, laid eggs in clutches averaging around 25 eggs each, and buried the nests under dirt and vegetation. The small eggs, about 11–12 centimetres (4.3–4.7 in) in diameter, contained fossilised embryos, complete with skin impressions. The impressions showed that titanosaurs were covered in a mosaic armour of small bead-like scales. The huge number of individuals gives evidence of herd behavior, which, along with their armor, could have helped provide protection against large predators such as Abelisaurus.

=== Range ===
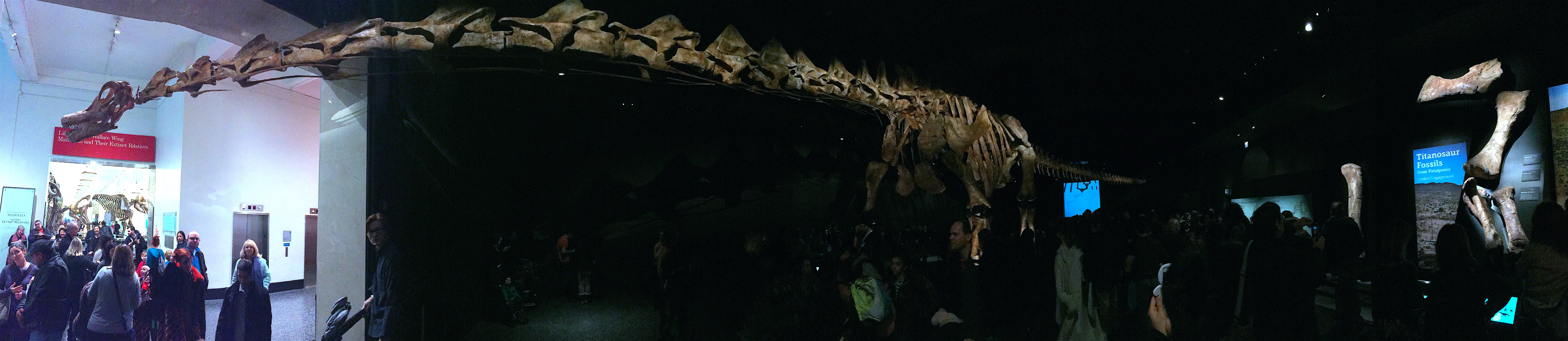
Patagotitan skeleton cast on display at the American Museum of Natural History

The titanosaurs were the last great group of sauropods, which existed from about 136 to 66 million years ago, before the Cretaceous–Paleogene extinction event, and were the dominant herbivores of their time. The fossil evidence suggests they replaced the other sauropods, like the diplodocids and the brachiosaurids, which died out between the late Jurassic and the mid-Cretaceous Periods.

Titanosaurs were widespread. In December 2011, Argentine scientists announced titanosaur fossils had been found on Antarctica—meaning that titanosaur fossils have been found on all continents. They are especially numerous in the southern continents (then part of the supercontinent of Gondwana). Australia had titanosaurs around 96 million years ago: fossils have been discovered in Queensland of a creature around 25 metres (82 ft) long. Remains have also been discovered in New Zealand. One of the largest ever titanosaur footprints was discovered in the Gobi Desert in 2016. One of the oldest remains of this group was described by Ghilardi et al. (2016). It was found from the Valley of the Dinosaurs, Paraíba state of Brazil, representing a 136-million-year-old subadult individual.

=== Paleopathology ===
Ibirania, a nanoid titanosaur fossil from Brazil suggests that individuals of various genera were susceptible to diseases such as osteomyelitis and parasite infestations. The specimen hails from the late cretaceous São José do Rio Preto Formation, Bauru Basin, and was described in the journal Cretaceous Research by Aureliano et al. (2021). Examination of the titanosaur's bones revealed what appear to be parasitic blood worms similar to the prehistoric Paleoleishmania but are 10-100 times larger, that seemed to have caused the osteomyelitis. The fossil is the first known instance of an aggressive case of osteomyelitis being caused by blood worms in an extinct animal.
