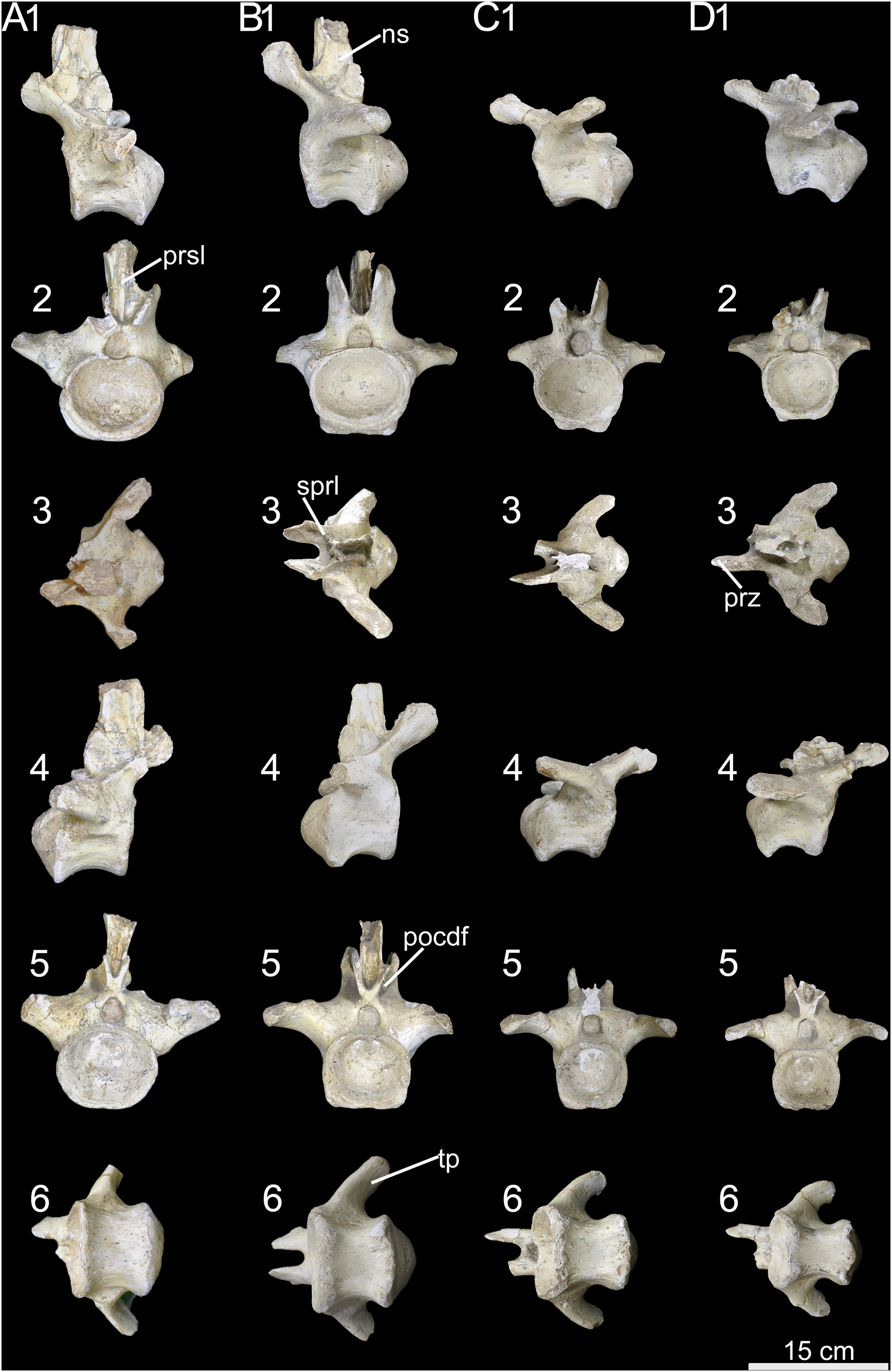
- Anterior caudal vertebra of the holotype seen from six different angles
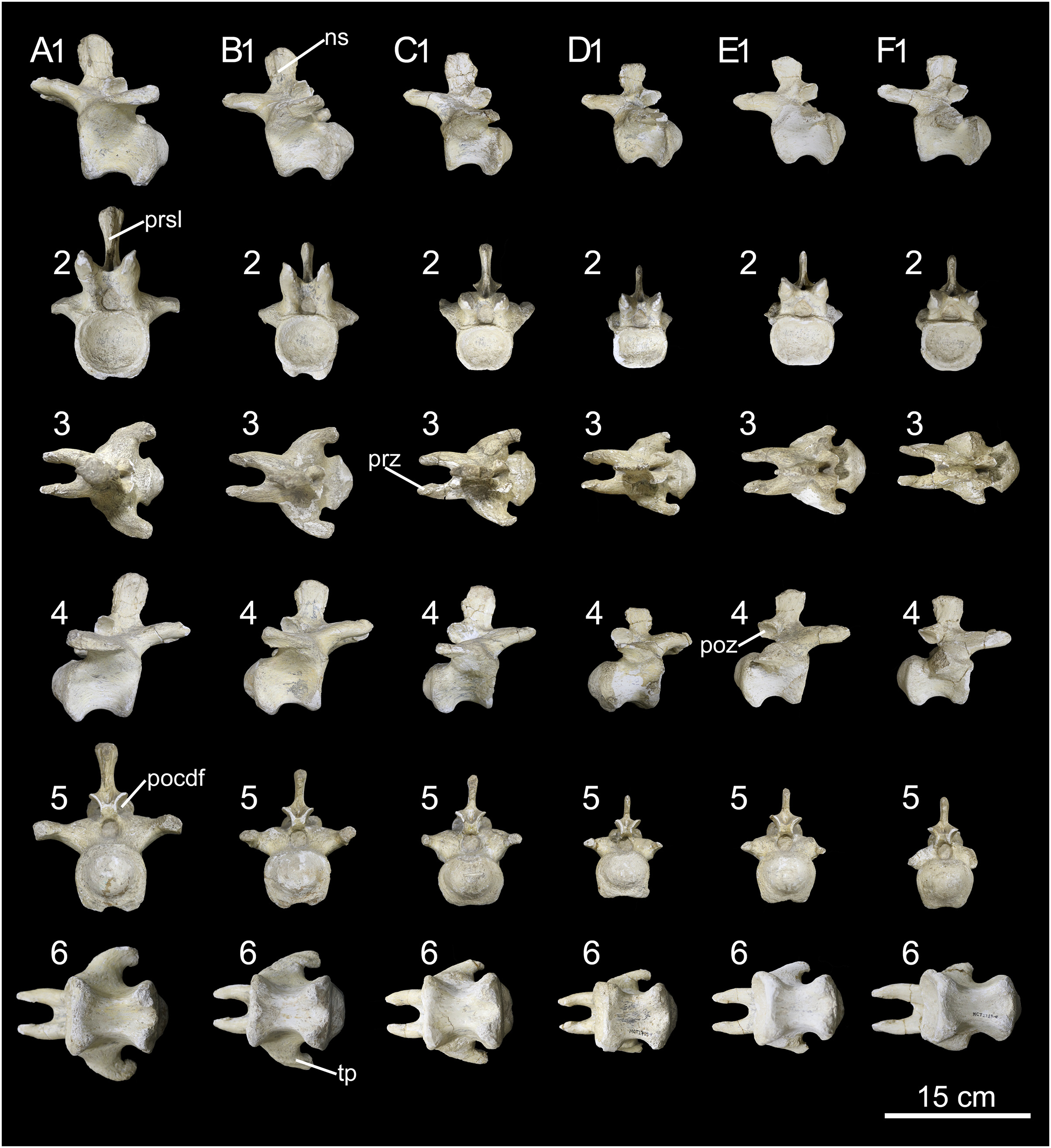
- Middle caudal vertebra of the holotype seen from six different angles

Scientific classification
- Domain: Eukaryota
- Kingdom: Animalia
- Phylum: Chordata
- Clade: Dinosauria
- Clade: Saurischia
- Clade: †Sauropodomorpha
- Clade: †Sauropoda
- Clade: †Macronaria
- Clade: †Titanosauria
- Clade: †Lithostrotia
- Clade: †Aeolosaurini
- Genus: †Caieiria; Silva Junior et al., 2022

Type species
- †Caieiria allocaudata Silva Junior et al., 2022

= Caieiria =

Caieiria Temporal range: Late Cretaceous Maastrichtian

Extinct genus of titanosaurian dinosaurs

Caieiria (named after the Caieira locality where its fossils were recovered) is a genus of titanosaurian dinosaur from the Late Cretaceous Serra da Galga Formation (formerly a unit of the Marília Formation) of Brazil. The type and only species is Caieiria allocaudata.

== Discovery and naming ==
From the 1940s to 1960s, the paleontologist Llewellyn Ivor Price excavated several series of titanosaur fossils in the "Caieira" locality of the Serra da Galga Formation in Minas Gerais, Brazil and he discovered the holotype of Caieiria around 1957. Two of these, "Series B" or MCT 1488-R and "Series C" or MCT 1490-R, have been named the holotypes of two titanosaur genera: Trigonosaurus and Baurutitan respectively. The describers of Trigonosaurus also referred a series of ten caudal vertebrae, MCT 1719-R, as the paratype of their new genus. Further titanosaurs from the BR-262 site of the same locality were reported by Silva Junior and colleagues in 2022, and in light of this new evidence, reconsidered MCT 1488-R to be a specimen of Baurutitan and thus synonymized Trigonosaurus with it. They also separated the tail from Trigonosaurus and named it as the holotype of a new genus and species, Caieiria allocaudata. The generic name "Caieiria" honors the Caieira locality while the specific name "allocaudata" means "strange tail", referring to its unusual anatomy.

== Description ==
The describing authors indicated two traits in which Caieria distinguishes itself from Baurutitan britoi, Uberabatitan ribeiroi and Gondwanatitan faustoi. The tail vertebrae possess robust side processes that are vertically expanded to almost half the height of their centra. The front tail vertebrae show a deep excavation between the lamina postzygapophysealis and the lamina centrodiapophysealis.

== Classification ==
Silva Junior et al. performed a phylogenetic analysis of titanosaurs including both Caieiria and Baurutitan with the latter incorporating information from Trigonosaurus. Both taxa were found to be in a clade at the base of Aeolosaurini, which, like many other analyses, is recovered within Rinconsauria. Their cladogram is shown below:

- Rinconsauria
  - Rinconsaurus
  - - Uberabatitan
    - Aeolosaurini
      - - Baurutitan
        - Gondwanatitan
        - - Bravasaurus
          - Caieiria
      - - Muyelensaurus
        - - Overosaurus
          - - Arrudatitan
            - - Aeolosaurus spp.
              - Punatitan

== Paleoenvironment ==
The Serra da Galga Formation's paleofauna were all originally thought to be from the Marília Formation, before its fossil-bearing bed was separated into another formation in 2020. Other than Baurutitan and Caieiria, other animals from this formation include the unenlagiine Ypupiara and the crocodylomorphs Itasuchus, Peirosaurus, and Uberabasuchus.
