= Serra da Galga Formation =

Geological formation in Brazil

- Stratigraphic range: Maastrichtian; ~68–66 Ma
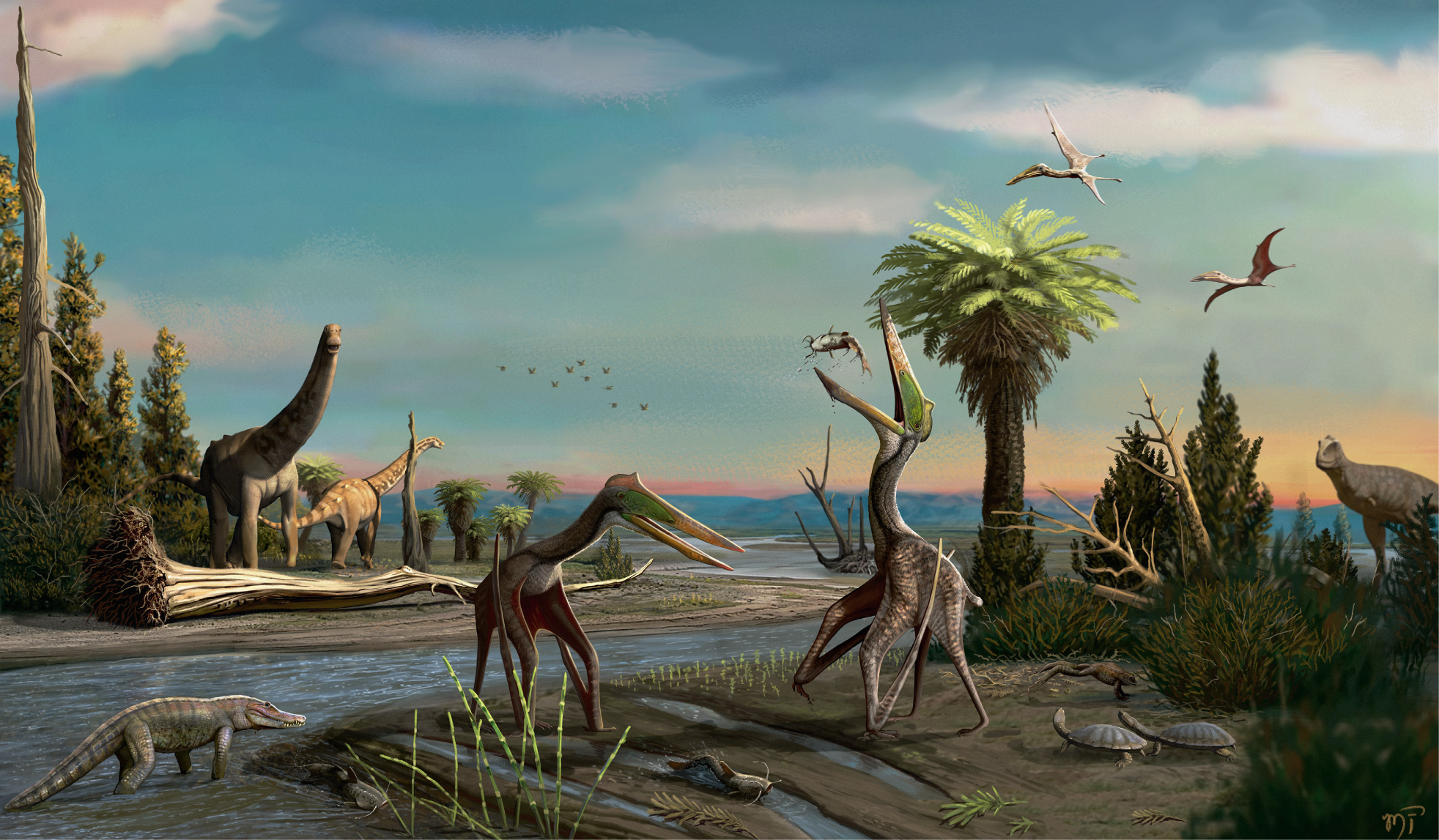
- Paleoartist's reconstruction of the paleoenvironment of the Serra da Galga Formation
- Type: Geological formation
- Unit of: Bauru Group
- Overlies: Uberaba Formation; Adamantina Formation

Lithology
- Primary: Sandstone
- Other: Mudstone, siltstone, limestone, paleosol

Location
- Coordinates: 19.6°S 48.0°W
- Approximate paleocoordinates: 23.1°S 33.9°W
- Region: Minas Gerais
- Country: Brazil
- Extent: Bauru Sub-basin, Paraná Basin

Type section
- Named for: Serra da Galga
- Serra da Galga Formation (Brazil)

The Serra da Galga Formation is a geological formation in Minas Gerais state of southeastern Brazil. Its strata date back to the Maastrichtian, and are part of the Bauru Group. It was originally considered a member of the Marília Formation.

Dinosaur remains are among the fossils that have been recovered from the formation.

== Geology ==
The Serra da Galga formation is interpreted as having been deposited under a hot, dry climate. The formation is considered to be of a Late Maastrichtian age.

== Fossil content ==
Color key: Taxon / Reclassified taxon / Taxon falsely reported as present / Dubious taxon or junior synonym / Ichnotaxon / Ootaxon / Morphotaxon	Notes; Uncertain or tentative taxa are in small text; ~~crossed out~~ taxa are discredited.

=== Crurotarsans ===
Crocodylomorphs of the Serra da Galga Formation
Genus	Species	Location	Materials	Notes	Images
Itasuchus	I. jesuinoi	Area 2	A skull	Basal notosuchian	Itasuchus Uberabasuchus
Labidiosuchus	L. amicum	Serra do Veadinho, Area 2	An incomplete lower jaw with the anterior part of the dentary complete, lacking most of the right mandibular ramus and the end of the left mandibular ramus	A notosuchian with bizarre dentition	Itasuchus Uberabasuchus
Peirosaurus	P. torminni	Area 2	A fragmented skull and partial postcranial skeleton	A peirosaurid	Itasuchus Uberabasuchus
Uberabasuchus	U. terrificus	Serra do Veadinho, Area 2		A peirosaurid	Itasuchus Uberabasuchus

Color key: Taxon / Reclassified taxon / Taxon falsely reported as present / Dubious taxon or junior synonym / Ichnotaxon / Ootaxon / Morphotaxon	Notes; Uncertain or tentative taxa are in small text; ~~crossed out~~ taxa are discredited.

=== Dinosaurs ===
Three distinct titanosaurids denoted as forms A, B, and C have been found in Area 4. Titanosaurine remains are known from Areas 1 and 2. Indeterminate theropod remains known from Area 1. Indeterminate maniraptor remains known from Area 1. Indeterminate abelisaurid remains are known from Areas 1 and 2. Enantiornithines have also been recovered. An indeterminate abelisauroid tibia, potentially referrable to noasauridae, is known as well.

==== Sauropods ====
Sauropods of the Serra da Galga Formation
Genus	Species	Location	Stratigraphic position	Material	Notes	Images
Aeolosaurus	Indeterminate				A titanosaurian	Aeolosaurus Baurutitan Trigonosaurus Uberabatitan
Baurutitan	B. britoi	Area 1			A titanosaurian	Aeolosaurus Baurutitan Trigonosaurus Uberabatitan
Caieiria	C. allocaudata	Caieira		Caudal vetebra	A titanosaurian	Aeolosaurus Baurutitan Trigonosaurus Uberabatitan
Titanosauria	indet.	BR-050 Km 153-153.5, Ponto 1		Isolate teeth.	Three morphotypes; one is one of the largest known titanosaurs and two are possible juveniles.	Aeolosaurus Baurutitan Trigonosaurus Uberabatitan
Trigonosaurus	T. pricei	Area 1			A titanosaurian, possibly synonymous with Baurutitan.	Aeolosaurus Baurutitan Trigonosaurus Uberabatitan
Uberabatitan	U. ribeiroi			Several postcranial elements	A titanosaurian	Aeolosaurus Baurutitan Trigonosaurus Uberabatitan

==== Theropods ====
Theropods of the Serra da Galga Formation
Genus	Species	Location	Stratigraphic position	Material	Notes	Images
Abelisauridae indet.	Indeterminate			Isolated teeth	Several abelisaurid teeth of varying sizes and morphologies	
Abelisauroidea indet.	Indeterminate			A tibia	An indeterminate abelisauroid specimen, possibly belonging to a new taxon	
"Lopasaurus"	None given			An incomplete right metatarsus	A dromaeosaurid. The holotype went missing shortly after 1980, and it has not been recovered since	
Ypupiara	Y. lopai			A right maxilla and dentary (which was associated with a fish jaw)	A unenlagiinae paravian	

=== Pterosaurs ===
Pterosaurs of the Serra da Galga Formation
Genus	Species	Location	Stratigraphic position	Material	Notes	Images
Galgadraco	G. zephyrius	Serra da Galga Geosite		A fragment of the upper beak	An azhdarchid pterosaur; the first pterosaur described from the Bauru Group	

== See also ==
- Peirópolis
- List of dinosaur-bearing rock formations
