= Coli Toro Formation =

Geologic formation in Argentina

- Stratigraphic range: Maastrichtian-Danian
- Type: Formation
- Overlies: Angostura Colorada Formation

Lithology
- Primary: Sandstone

Location
- Coordinates: 41.0°S 69.5°W
- Approximate paleocoordinates: 43.6°S 55.4°W
- Region: Río Negro Province
- Country: Argentina
- Extent: Neuquén Basin
- Coli Toro Formation (Argentina)

The Coli Toro Formation is a Maastrichtian-Danian geological formation in Argentina. Dinosaur remains are among the fossils that have been recovered from the formation, although none have yet been referred to a specific genus. The rocks of the formation were deposited in a marine environment, in opposition to the marginal underlying sedimentary environment.

The formation in later publications has been reassigned as the Coli Toro Member at the basal levels of the Los Alamitos Formation, containing fossil remains of Sulcusuchus erraini. The formation partly overlies the Angostura Colorada Formation.

== Fossil content ==
Dinosaurs from the Coli Toro Formation
Genus	Species	Location	Stratigraphic Position	Material	Notes	Images
Hadrosauridae indet.	Indeterminate	Cerro Yeso		Isolated caudal vertebrae	Indeterminate hadrosaurid ornithopod	
Titanosauria indet.	Indeterminate	Cerro Yeso		A tooth (MHJG-NCP, formerly 5/4/7-3)	Indeterminate titanosaurian sauropod	
Abelisauridae indet.	Indeterminate	Estancia Yuquinche		A tooth (MHJG-NCP 299)	The first theropod from the Coli Toro Formation	

Other reptiles from the Coli Toro Formation
Genus	Species	Location	Stratigraphic Position	Material	Notes	Images
Peirosauridae indet.?	Indeterminate	Cerro Yeso		A tooth (MHJG Pa 614 106)	An indeterminate crocodyliform tooth, probably belonging to the notosuchian family Peirosauridae.	
Sulcusuchus	S. erraini	Cerro Yeso and near Laguna Cari-Laufquén Grande		Teeth (Cerro Yeso) and a fragmentary mandibular ramus (Laguna Cari-Laufquén Grande)	The only named polycotylid plesiosaur from the Southern Hemisphere, and the most recent one worldwide. Also found in La Colonia Formation.	
Testudines indet.	Indeterminate	Cerro Yeso		Turtle plates are reportly commonly found in the Cerro Yeso locality		

FIsh from the Coli Toro Formation
Genus	Species	Location	Stratigraphic Position	Material	Notes	Images
Metaceratodus?	Indeterminate	Cerro Yeso		Dental plates	A lungfish	

== See also ==
- Angostura Colorada Formation
- La Colonia Formation
- Los Alamitos Formation
- Allen Formation
- Jaguel Formation
- Chorrillo Formation
- Calafate Formation
- El Molino Formation
- Yacoraite Formation
- Vilquechico Formation
- Serra da Galga Formation
- List of dinosaur-bearing rock formations
  - List of stratigraphic units with indeterminate dinosaur fossils
