= Aridi =

Aridi is a surname mainly based in Mount Lebanon. Notable people with the surname include:

- Ghazi Aridi (born 1954), Lebanese politician, MP, and government minister
- Saleh al Aridi (1957–2008), Lebanese politician

== See also ==
- Physa aridi, a fossil species
