= Physa mezzalirai =

Physa mezzalirai Temporal range: Turonian–Santonian

Scientific classification
- Kingdom: Animalia
- Phylum: Mollusca
- Class: Gastropoda
- Superorder: Hygrophila
- Family: Physidae
- Genus: Physa
- Species: †P. mezzalirai

Binomial name
- †Physa mezzalirai Ghilardi, Carbonaro & Simone, 2011

Extinct species of gastropod

Physa mezzalirai is an extinct fossil species of air-breathing freshwater snail, an aquatic pulmonate gastropod mollusc belonging to the family Physidae. This species is characterized by its small sinistral (left-handed) shell, a common feature in this family. Physa mezzalirai dates back to the Turonian to Santonian-aged Adamantina Formation (Upper Cretaceous Bauru Group), in São Paulo state, Brazil.
