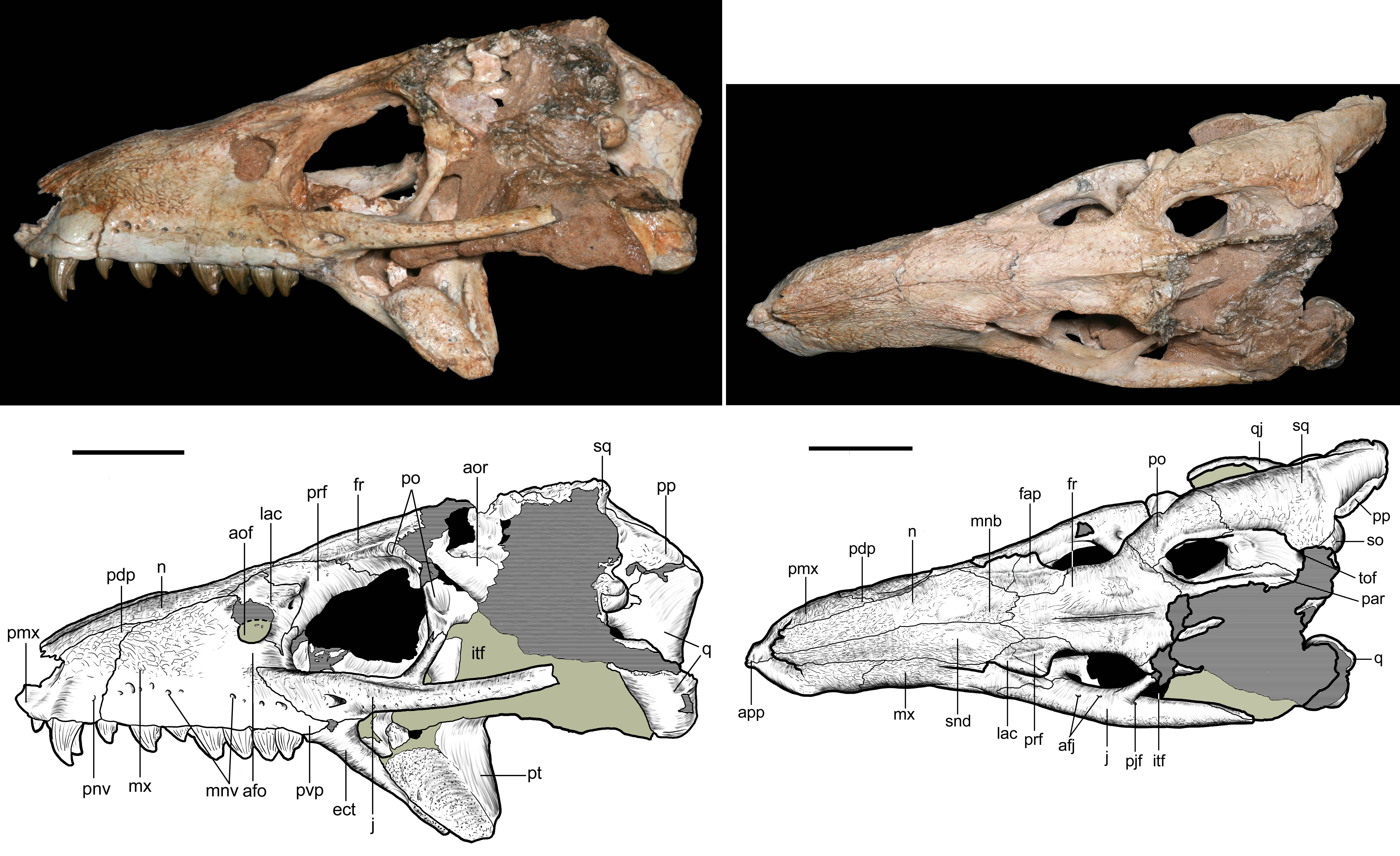
- Left and upper side of the C. stenognathus holotype skull

Scientific classification
- Kingdom: Animalia
- Phylum: Chordata
- Class: Reptilia
- Clade: Archosauria
- Clade: Pseudosuchia
- Clade: Crocodylomorpha
- Clade: †Notosuchia
- Family: †Sphagesauridae
- Genus: †Caipirasuchus; Iori & Carvalho, 2011

Type species
- †Caipirasuchus paulistanus Iori & Carvalho, 2011

Species
- †C. paulistanus Iori & Carvalho, 2011; †C. montealtensis (Andrade & Bertini, 2008 [originally Sphagesaurus montealtensis]); †C. stenognathus Pol et al., 2014; †C. mineirus Martinelli et al., 2018; †C. attenboroughi Ruiz et al., 2021; †C. catanduvensis Iori et al., 2024

= Caipirasuchus =

Caipirasuchus Temporal range: Late Cretaceous, Turonian–Santonian

Extinct genus of reptiles

Caipirasuchus is an extinct genus of sphagesaurid notosuchians known from the Late Cretaceous of northern São Paulo State and western Minas Gerais State, southeastern Brazil. The type species, C. paulistanus, was named in 2011. A second species, C. montealtensis, was referred to Caipirasuchus in 2013 after having been named in 2008 as a species of Sphagesaurus. A third species, C. stenognathus, was described in 2014. A fourth species, C. mineirus, was described in 2018. A fifth species, C. attenboroughi, was named in 2021 in honour of David Attenborough, and a sixth species, C. catanduvensis, was described in 2024, with a distinct chamber associated with the airways, possibly used in vocalization.

== Discovery and naming ==
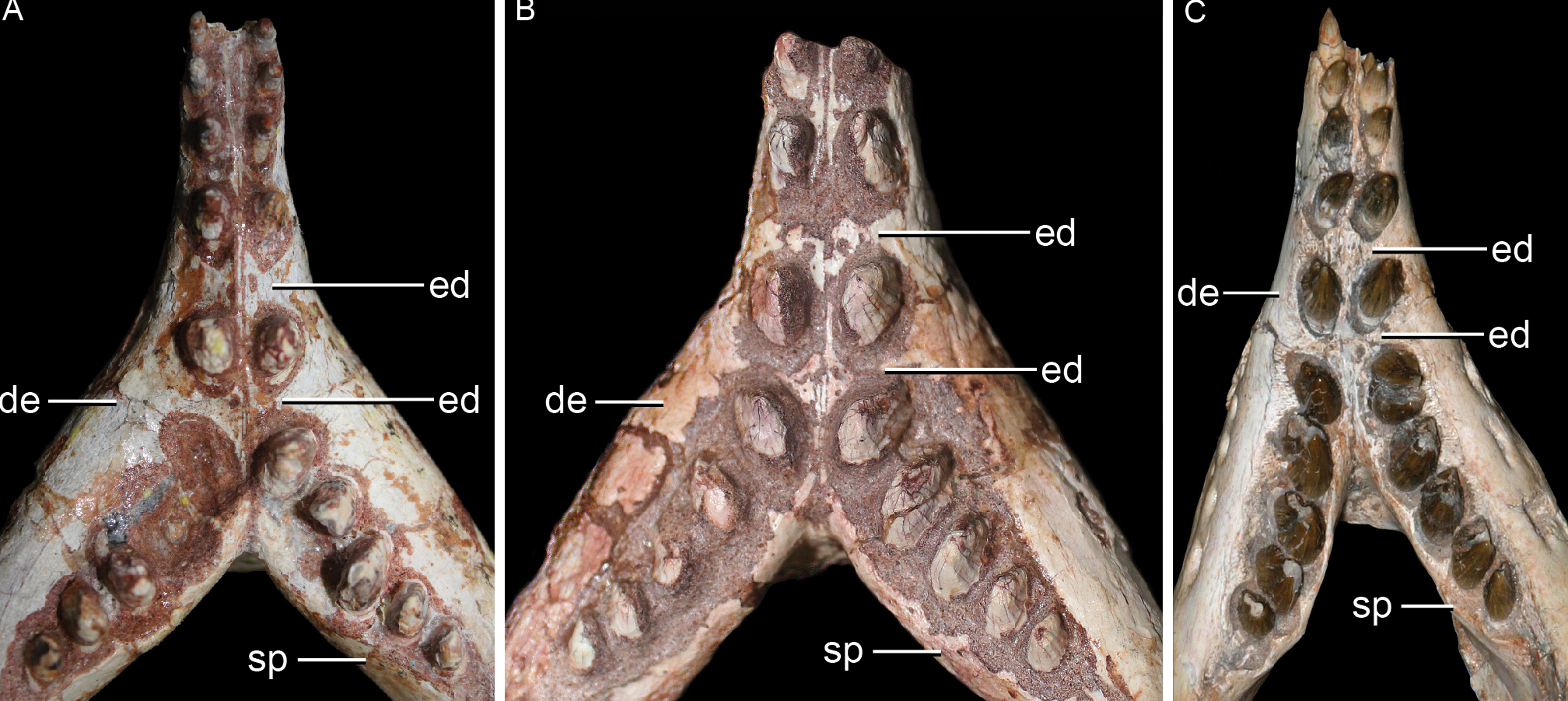
Mandibular symphysis of the first three named species

Caipirasuchus was first named by Fabiano V. Iori and Ismar S. Carvalho in 2011 and the type species is C. paulistanus. The generic name is derived from Tupi word Caipira which refers to the traditional inhabitants of interior of São Paulo, covering almost all of the Bauru Basin, and Greek souchus meaning "crocodile". The specific name is derived from "Paulista", the designation for the residents of São Paulo State, where the holotype was found.

C. paulistanus is known only from the holotype specimen MPMA 67-0001/00, an almost complete and undeformed skull and mandible with teeth (only three teeth are missing) and partial postcranium from a single individual. It was found on the São Francisco Farm, in Homem de Mello, the rural area of Monte Alto County of northern São Paulo. It was collected from the Adamantina Formation of the Bauru Basin, which dates to the Turonian and Santonian stages of the Late Cretaceous.

A second species, C. montealtensis, was named by Marco Brandalise de Andrade and Reinaldo J. Bertini in 2008 as a species of the closely related notosuchian genus Sphagesaurus, on the basis of MPMA 15-001/90, a nearly complete skull and mandible preserved in occlusion. It was collected from the Bairro Cachoeira locality at the base of the Serra da Água Limpa, about 8 km northwest of Monte Alto, from the Adamantina Formation. In 2013, this specimen was reassigned to Caipirasuchus on the basis of a newly discovered specimen referrable to it. MPMA 68-0003/12 consists of a nearly complete cranium and mandible, and a posterior portion of the post-cranium. It was discovered in the municipality of Catanduva, northern São Paulo, from the Adamantina Formation. At least five synapomorphies unite the species, and a phylogenetic analysis found them to be sister taxa. Later, in 2024, the specimen from Catanduva, initially interpreted as C. montealtensis, was diagnosed as a new species within the same genus, C. catanduvensis, supported by unique features found in its skull, and distinguished primarily by the complex pterygoid chambers interconnected with the airways, initially pointed out by.

== Description ==
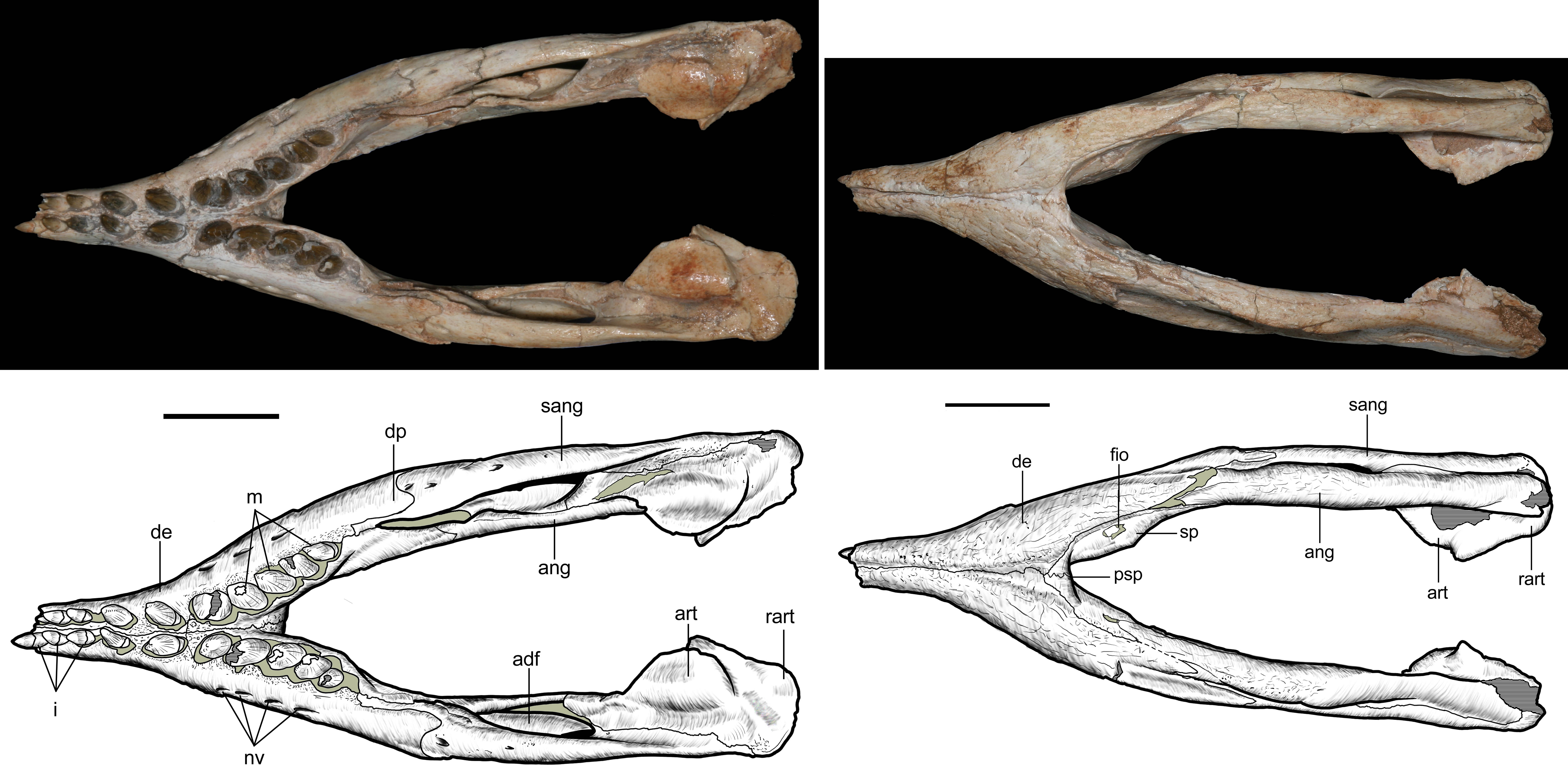
Mandible of C. stenognathus

C. paulistanus has about ten autapomorphies or unique characteristics. The external naris (the nostril opening in the skull) is bordered only by the premaxillae bones. Each premaxilla has four teeth set into it. There is a gap called a diastema in the premaxillary tooth row, and a diastema in between the premaxillary and maxillary teeth. The dentary bone of the lower jaw has ten teeth on either side, with two diastemata separating them. The forward-most teeth are suited for capturing food, while the back teeth are adapted for food processing. The palatine bone in the roof of the mouth connects to the maxilla bone of the snout by a region of bone called the cuneiform process. Caipirasuchus also has large pterygoid and ectopterygoid bones and a well-developed hole in front of the eye sockets called the antorbital fenestra.
