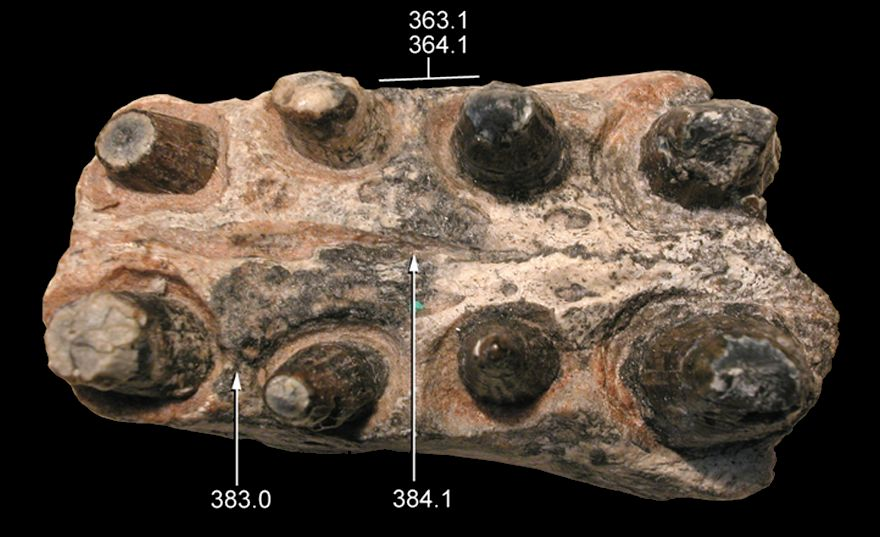

Scientific classification
- Kingdom: Animalia
- Phylum: Chordata
- Class: Reptilia
- Clade: Pseudosuchia
- Clade: Crocodylomorpha
- Clade: †Notosuchia
- Family: †Sphagesauridae
- Genus: †Sphagesaurus; Price, 1950

Type species
- †Sphagesaurus huenei Price, 1950

= Sphagesaurus =

Sphagesaurus Temporal range: Late Cretaceous, ~84.9–66.043 Ma

Extinct genus of reptiles

Sphagesaurus is an extinct genus of sphagesaurid notosuchian crocodylomorph from the Late Cretaceous of southwest São Paulo, southern Brazil. In a 2026 taxonomic review, Pedro Akira Kitayama and Reinaldo José Bertini proposed that Armadillosuchus arrudai and Caryonosuchus pricei were junior synonyms of S. huenei, explicitly treating this interpretation as provisional.

== Species and discovery ==
Sphagesaurus was first described and named by Llewellyn Ivor Price in 1950 and the type species is S. huenei. S. huenei was described by Price (1950) on the basis of two isolated molariform maxillary teeth, the holotype DGM 332-R and the referred specimen DGM 333-R. The holotype was found in a railway cut between the cities of Presidente Bernardes and Santo Anastacio in the state of São Paulo, while DGM 333-R was found near Catanduva city of São Paulo, both from the Bauru Group. Bertini et al. (1993) referred the isolated molariform tooth, URC-R 015 from Locality 99 of the Adamantina Formation, to S. huenei, and referred the DGM specimens to the same formation.

Kellner et al. (1995) and Kellner & Campos (1999) tentatively assigned DGM 1411-R, a nearly complete but crushed anterior portion of the skull and lower jaw, to S. huenei and then to S. sp. It was found near Presidente Prudente city of southwest São Paulo, from the Adamantina Formation of the Bauru Basin. It was reassigned to a new genus and species, Caryonosuchus pricei, by Kellner et al. (2011). They also considered the type material of S. huenei to be undiagnosable and suggested that the species might be a nomen dubium.

Pol (2003) described RCL-100, a nearly complete skull referred to S. huenei. It consists of the rostrum, orbital and temporal regions, except for its dorsal elements. A mandibular fragment corresponding to the dentary symphysis was found in natural occluding position. The specimen was collected at the sediments of the Adamantina Formation during the construction of the new railroad station of Buenopolis city of São Paulo. Kitayama and Bertini (2026) also reviewed URC-R-92, a skull with mandibular and postcranial remains previously reported in 2006 and described in 2009, as comparative material of S. huenei.

A second species, S. montealtensis, was described from the Late Cretaceous of Brazil. It was named by Marco Brandalise de Andrade and Reinaldo J. Bertini in 2008, on the basis of MPMA 15-001/90, a nearly complete skull and mandible preserved in occlusion. It was collected from the Bairro Cachoeira locality at the base of the Serra da Água Limpa, about 8 km northwest of Monte Alto city of northern São Paulo, from the Adamantina Formation. In 2013, this specimen was reassigned to the closely related notosuchian genus Caipirasuchus, creating the combinatio nova Caipirasuchus montealtensis. The type species of the genus, C. paulistanus, is known only from the holotype specimen MPMA 67-0001/00, an almost complete and undeformed skull and mandible with teeth (only three teeth are missing) and partial postcranium, from a single individual. It was found on the São Francisco Farm, in Homem de Mello, the rural area of Monte Alto County, also from the Adamantina Formation. S. montealtensis was reassigned to Caipirasuchus on the basis of a newly discovered specimen referable to it. MPMA 68-0003/12 consists of a nearly complete cranium and mandible and a posterior portion of the postcranium. It was discovered in the municipality of Catanduva, northern São Paulo, from the Adamantina Formation. At least five synapomorphies unite the species, and a phylogenetic analysis found them to be sister taxa.

=== 2026 taxonomic review ===
Kitayama and Bertini (2026) reassessed the characters used to distinguish S. huenei, Armadillosuchus arrudai and Caryonosuchus pricei. They interpreted the observed differences in cranial ornamentation, skull proportions and dentition as insufficient to distinguish the three species reliably, citing possible intraspecific variation, preservational deformation and inconsistent interpretations of some dental characters. On this basis, they proposed referring the Armadillosuchus specimens UFRJ DG 303-R and MPMA 64 0001-04, and the Caryonosuchus holotype DGM 1411-R, to S. huenei.

The authors retained RCL-100 as a referred specimen of S. huenei and identified it as a candidate for neotype designation because of its widespread use in anatomical and systematic studies. They explicitly described their taxonomic interpretation as provisional and subject to reassessment through additional well-preserved specimens or quantitative morphological analyses.
