= Adamantina Formation =

Geologic formation in Brazil

- Stratigraphic range: Late Coniacian-Early Maastrichtian; 87.8–68 Ma
- Type: Geological formation
- Unit of: Bauru Group
- Underlies: Uberaba Formation
- Overlies: Santo Anastacio, Caiuá and Araçatuba Formations

Lithology
- Primary: Sandstone, calcrete
- Other: Mudstone, siltstone, conglomerate, coal

Location
- Coordinates: 21.6°S 50.1°W
- Approximate paleocoordinates: 25.8°S 33.1°W
- Region: São Paulo
- Country: Brazil
- Extent: Bauru Basin, Paraná Basin

Type section
- Named for: Adamantina
- Adamantina Formation (Brazil)

The Adamantina Formation is a geological formation in the Bauru Basin of western São Paulo state in southeastern Brazil.

Its strata date back to the Late Cretaceous epoch of the Cretaceous Period, during the Mesozoic Era. The formation is part of the Bauru Group in the northeastern Paraná Basin.

== Geology ==
Dinosaur remains are among the fossils that have been recovered from the Adamantina Formation. According to some studies, the Adamantina Formation dates from the Turonian to the Santonian stage (90-83.5 million years ago) of the late Cretaceous, other studies have found a much younger age - Campanian to Maastrichtian (83.5-66 million years ago) of the late Cretaceous.

More recent studies lean into the latter category and an unpublished article abstract revealed at the Society of Vertebrate Paleontology in 2017 also argues that the Allen Formation, Loncoche, and Los Alamitos Formation are all contemporaries and are no later than 72.1Ma in age. A zircon was found dating to 87.8 Ma, so this represents a maximum age.

=== Geological setting ===
During the Early Jurassic, the supercontinent Pangea started to drift apart due to the breakup of Gondwana and Laurasia. The breakup of Gondwana caused the formation of the large Parana Basin. This basin has a size of ~1,100,000km2 and can be found not only in Brazil but also in Paraguay, Uruguay, and Argentina. The separation of the supercontinent and the breakup of Brazil and Africa was accompanied by volcanism that caused large eruptions of flood basalts. These volcanic rocks formed the Serra Geral Formation which underlies the deposits of the Bauru Group.

The Bauru Basin is a trough that, as Miall (1990) argues, evolved due to "thermo-mechanical subsidence" during the Late Cretaceous, probably due to the breakup of Africa and India. The sediments reach a thickness of up to ~300 m and consist mainly of siliciclastic sediments. The Bauru Group can be subdivided into five different formations from bottom to top: Caiua, Santo Anastacio, Adamantina, and Uberaba. Not all formations are equally well represented in the different states and differences occur according their sedimentary composition and therefore also in their naming.

== Vertebrate paleofauna ==
=== Crocodylomorphs ===
Color key: Taxon / Reclassified taxon / Taxon falsely reported as present / Dubious taxon or junior synonym / Ichnotaxon / Ootaxon / Morphotaxon	Notes; Uncertain or tentative taxa are in small text; ~~crossed out~~ taxa are discredited.

Crocodylomorphs of the Adamantina Formation
Genus	Species	Location	Stratigraphic position	Material	Notes	Images
Adamantinasuchus	A. navae			Six specimens and several isolated bone remains.	A zhiphosuchian notosuhian	
Aphaurosuchus	A. kaiju			Skull elements and teeth.	A baurusuchine baurusuchid	
Aplestosuchus	B. sordidus				A baurusuchine baurusuchid	
Armadillosuchus	A. arrudai				A sphagesaurid notosuchian	
Barreirosuchus	B. franciscoi				A itasuchid notosuchia	
Baurusuchus	B. albertoi				A baurusuchine baurusuchid	
Baurusuchus	B. pachechoi				A baurusuchine baurusuchid	
Baurusuchus	B. salgadoensis				A baurusuchine baurusuchid	
Brasileosaurus	B. pachecoi				A notosuchid notosuchian	
Campinasuchus	C. dinizi				A pissarrachampsine baurusuchid	
Caipirasuchus	C. catanduvensis				A sphagesaurid notosuchian	
Caipirasuchus	C. paulistanus				A sphagesaurid notosuchian	
Caryonosuchus	C. pricei				A sphagesaurid notosuchian	
Epoidesuchus	E. tavaresae.				A itasuchid notosuchian	
Mariliasuchus	M. amarali			Very common. Several specimens - juvenile and adults – with skulls articulated to skeletons, and many isolated materials. Eggs clutches, eggshells, and coprolites were found also.	A notosuchid notosuchian	
Mariliasuchus	M. robustus				A notosuchid notosuchian	
Montealtosuchus	M. arrudacamposi				A peirosaurid notosuchian	
Morrinhosuchus	M. luziae				A sphagesaurid notosuchian	
Roxochampsa	R. paulistanus			Several teeth, splenials, and dentaries.	A itasuchid notosuchian	
Sphagesaurus	S. huenei				A sphagesaurid notosuchian	
Sphagesaurus	S. montealtensis				A sphagesaurid notosuchian	
Stratiotosuchus	S. maxhechti				A baurusuchine baurusuchid	
Sphagesauria Indet.	Indeterminate			A tooth	One of the largest sphagesaurian specimens reported to date from the formation and the first notosuchian record from mid-west Brazil	

Crocodylomorph eggs have also been found in the Adamantina formation. With the largest known mesozoic crocodylian egg clutch (47 eggs) being founin the formation.

=== Dinosaurs ===
==== Sauropods ====
Sauropods of the Adamantina Formation
Genus	Species	Location	Stratigraphic position	Material	Notes	Images
Adamantisaurus	A. mezzalirai				A lithostrotian titanosaurian	
Arrudatitan	A. maximus			A single partially articulated skeleton.	An aeolosaurin titanosaurian	
Antarctosaurus	A. brasiliensis			Postcranial remains.	A colossosaurian titanosaurian	
Brasilotitan	B. nemophagus	Raposo Tavares.		A partial skeleton and dentition.	A lithostrotian titanosaurian	
Gondwanatitan	G. faustoi			Partial postcranial skeleton.	An aeolosaurin lithostrotian	
Maxakalisaurus	M. topai			A fragmentary right maxilla with teeth, twelve cervical vertebrae and some cervical ribs, seven dorsal vertebrae and some dorsal ribs, a neural spine and centrum from the sacrum, six caudal vertebrae, some haemal arches, pieces of the scapulae, both sternal plates, part of the left ischium, both humeri, two metacarpals, part of the fibula, an osteoderm, and some unidentified pieces	An aeolosaurin lithostrotian	

==== Theropods ====
Theropods of the Adamantina Formation
Genus	Species	Location	Stratigraphic position	Material	Notes	Images
Abelisauridae Indet.	Indeterminate			Fragment of right premaxilla and a tooth		
Abelisauridae Indet.	Inderteminate			A fragmentary left ilium with most of the preacetabular and supracetabular regions preserved. An distal portion of a right femur.		
Enantiornithes indet.	Indeterminate			Near complete jaws and skulls		
Navaornis	N. hestiae			Complete skull and well-preserved skeleton	An enantiornithean bird	
Noasauridae Indet.	Indeterminate			Cervical vertebra, almost complete right femur.	An isolated cervical vertebra (DGM 929-R), (CPPLIP 1490) almost complete isolated right femur	
Unenlagiinae indet.	Indeterminate			A single dorsal vertebra		

=== Squamates ===
Squamate fossils include those of unnamed, indeterminate snakes.

Squamates of the Adamantina Formation
Genus	Species	Location	Stratigraphic position	Material	Notes	Images
Boipeba	B. tayasuensis			A single precloacal vertebra	A large, primitive blind snake	
Brasiliguana	B. prudentis			A maxilla	An iguanian lizard	
Squamata indet.	Indeterminate	Estrada Velha, ponto 1		MPM 151 R consists of 10 articulated dorsal vertebrae	A non-snake squamate	
Tametara	T. mirim				An early snake	

=== Amphibians ===
Amphibians of the Adamantina Formation
Genus	Species	Location	Stratigraphic position	Material	Notes	Images
Baurubatrachus	B. santosdoroi	Near Catanduva city, São Paulo.		Remains of two individuals	A frog	
Calyptocephalellidae indet.	Indeterminate					
Mariliabatrachus	M. navai				A frog.	

=== Turtles ===
Turtle of the Adamantina Formation
Genus	Species	Location	Stratigraphic position	Material	Notes	Images
Bauruemys	B. brasilensis				A podocnemidoid side-necked turtle	
Roxochelys	R. wanderleyi				A podocnemididoid side-necked turtle	
Yuraramirim	Y. montealtensis				A peiropemydid side-necked turtle	

=== Fish ===
Fishes of the Adamantina Formation
Genus	Species	Location	Stratigraphic position	Material	Notes	Images
Amiidae indet.	Indeterminate					
Atractosteus	A. sp.				A gar	
Britosteus	B. amarildoi				A gar	
Dipnoi indet.	Indeterminate					
Lepisosteidae indet.	Indeterminate, previously described as "Lepisosteus cominatoi"				A gar	

=== Mammals ===
Mammals of the Adamantina Formation
Genus	Species	Location	Stratigraphic position	Material	Notes	Images
Eutheria indet.	Indeterminate					
Brasilestes	B. stardusti				A tribosphenic mammal	
Gondwanatheria indet.	Indeterminate					
Meridiolestida indet.	Indeterminate					

== See also ==
- Geologic formations of Brazil
- List of dinosaur-bearing rock formations
- Paleontological sites of Brazil
- Asencio Formation
