= Physa megalochlamys =

Conservation status
- Vulnerable (NatureServe)

Scientific classification
- Kingdom: Animalia
- Phylum: Mollusca
- Class: Gastropoda
- Superorder: Hygrophila
- Family: Physidae
- Genus: Physa
- Species: P. megalochlamys

Binomial name
- Physa megalochlamys Taylor, 1988

Species of gastropod

Physa megalochlamys is a species of gastropod belonging to the family Physidae.

The species inhabits freshwater environments.
