= Marília Formation =

Geologic formation in Brazil

- Stratigraphic range: Maastrichtian; ~70–66 Ma
- Type: Geological formation
- Unit of: Bauru Group
- Overlies: Uberaba Formation; Adamantina Formation

Lithology
- Primary: Sandstone
- Other: Mudstone, siltstone, limestone

Location
- Coordinates: 19.6°S 48.0°W
- Approximate paleocoordinates: 23.1°S 33.9°W
- Region: Minas Gerais
- Country: Brazil
- Extent: Bauru Sub-basin, Paraná Basin

Type section
- Named for: Marília
- Marília Formation (Brazil)

The Marília Formation is a geological formation in Minas Gerais state of southeastern Brazil. Its strata date back to the Maastrichtian, and are part of the Bauru Group.

The fossil-bearing Serra da Galga and Ponte Alta members were originally thought to belong to this formation but were split off into the Serra da Galga Formation in 2020.

== Fossil content ==
=== Lepidosaurians ===
Squamata of the Marilia Formation
Genus	Species	Location	Notes	Images
Pristiguana	P. brasiliensis		An iguanid	

=== Crurotarsans ===
Crocodylomorphs of the Marilia Formation
Genus	Species	Location	Notes	Images
Titanochampsa	T. iorii		A mesoeucrocodylian	

=== Ornithodirans ===
Dinosaurs of the Marilia Formation
Genus	Species	Location	Stratigraphic position	Material	Notes	Images
Kurupi	K. itaata				An abelisaurid	

=== Turtles ===
Turtles of the Marilia Formation
Genus	Species	Location	Stratigraphic position	Material	Notes	Images
Cambaremys	C. langertoni				A podocnemidoid turtle	
Peiropemys	P. mezzalirai				A peiropemymid turtle	
Pricemys	P. caiera				A peiroperymid turtle	

== See also ==
- List of dinosaur-bearing rock formations
