= Angostura Colorada Formation =

Late Cretaceous geologic formation of Argentina

- Stratigraphic range: Campanian-Maastrichtian
- Type: Geological formation
- Underlies: Coli Toro Formation, Huitrera & Collón Cura Formations
- Overlies: Sañicó Formation

Lithology
- Primary: Sandstone, claystone, conglomerate

Location
- Coordinates: 41.3°S 68.7°W
- Approximate paleocoordinates: 43.9°S 54.7°W
- Region: Río Negro Province
- Country: Argentina
- Extent: Neuquén Basin, North Patagonian Massif

Type section
- Named by: Volkhaimer
- Year defined: 1973
- Angostura Colorada Formation (Argentina)

The Angostura Colorada Formation is a Campanian to Maastrichtian geologic formation of the Neuquén Basin and North Patagonian Massif in the Río Negro Province of Argentina. Dinosaur remains diagnostic to the genus level are among the fossils that have been recovered from the formation.

== Description ==
The Angostura Colorada Formation was defined by Volkhaimer in 1973 and unconformably overlies the Late Triassic volcanics of the Sañicó Formation. The formation is partly overlain by the Huitrera and Collón Cura Formations, and in other parts by the Coli Toro Formation. The formation, outcropping south of Comallo, comprises sandstones, claystones and conglomerates deposited in a fluvial environment.

== Fossil content ==
Color key: Taxon / Reclassified taxon / Taxon falsely reported as present / Dubious taxon or junior synonym / Ichnotaxon / Ootaxon / Morphotaxon	Notes; Uncertain or tentative taxa are in small text; ~~crossed out~~ taxa are discredited.

=== Dinosaurs ===
==== Ornithischians ====
Ornithischians of the Angostura Colorada Formation
Genus	Species	Location	Stratigraphic position	Material	Notes	Image
Hadrosauridae indet.	Indeterminate					

==== Sauropods ====
Sauropods of the Angostura Colorada Formation
Genus	Species	Location	Stratigraphic position	Material	Notes	Images
Aeolosaurus	A. rionegrinus				A aeolosaurin lithostrotian	
Lithostrotia indet.	Indeterminate					
Saltasaurinae Indet.	Indeterminate					

==== Theropods ====
Theropods of the Angostura Colorada Formation
Genus	Species	Location	Stratigraphic position	Material	Notes	Images
Abelisauridae indet.	Indeterminate					

== See also ==
- List of dinosaur-bearing rock formations
  - List of stratigraphic units with few dinosaur genera
