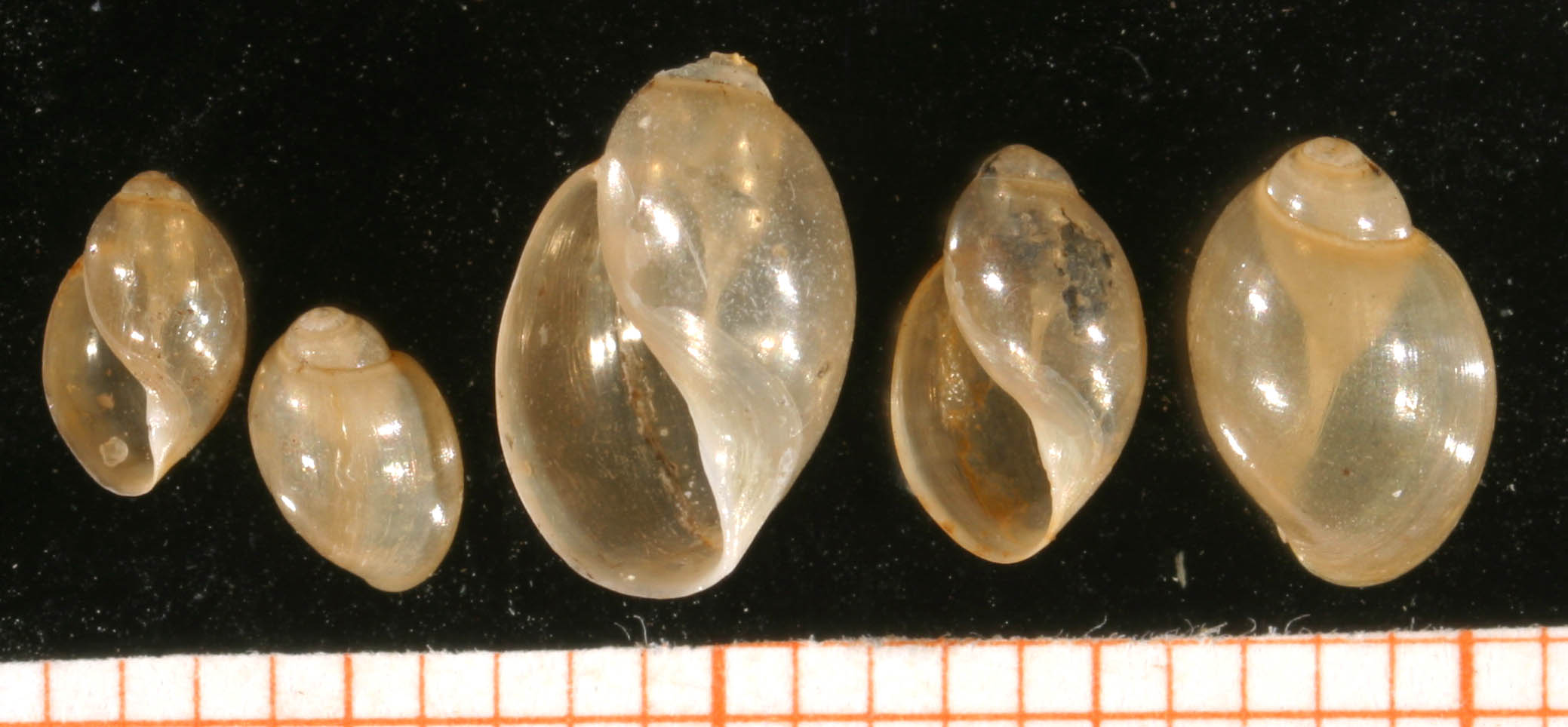
- Five shells of Physa fontinalis

Conservation status
- Least Concern (IUCN 3.1)

Scientific classification
- Kingdom: Animalia
- Phylum: Mollusca
- Class: Gastropoda
- Superorder: Hygrophila
- Family: Physidae
- Genus: Physa
- Species: P. fontinalis

Binomial name
- Physa fontinalis (Linnaeus, 1758)

Synonyms
- Bulla fontinalis Linnaeus, 1758 (basionym)

= Physa fontinalis =

Species of gastropod

Physa fontinalis, common name the common bladder snail, is a species of air-breathing freshwater snail, an aquatic gastropod mollusc in the family Physidae. The shells of species in the genus Physa are left-handed or sinistral.

== Description ==
The shell is 7 to 12 millimetres (0.28 to 0.47 in) high and 4 to 7 millimetres (0.16 to 0.28 in) wide. The spiral has four to five whorls, the last of which forms more than three-quarters of the shell height, and the apex is rounded. The shell is very thin-walled, translucent, shiny, and a pale horn colour. The aperture is wide and oval, and the mouth edge is very thin and brittle. The body color is brown to black. The edges of the mantle extend as finger-like lobes over the exterior of the shell. The tentacles are long, slender and cylindrical, with the eyes at the base. The foot is long and thin. Bladder snails are hermaphrodites.

== Ecology ==
This species is an opportunist inhabiting streams, rivers, ponds, lakes, springs, canals and irrigation ditches. It occurs in both nutrient-poor and richly vegetated habitats. It may be found in (moderately) polluted water bodies.

== Distribution ==
This species has a wide distribution in the western Palaearctic but confusion with similar species makes the eastern limits of its distribution uncertain. The range is probably Eurasian Boreo-temperate. Some ‘species’ found in North America may be conspecific in which case the range could be Circumpolar Boreo-temperate.

This species is found in the Czech Republic, Slovakia, Germany, Poland, the Netherlands, Croatia and others.

== Threats ==
Physa fontinalis is a Least Concern species, but is included on National and Regional Red Lists.
