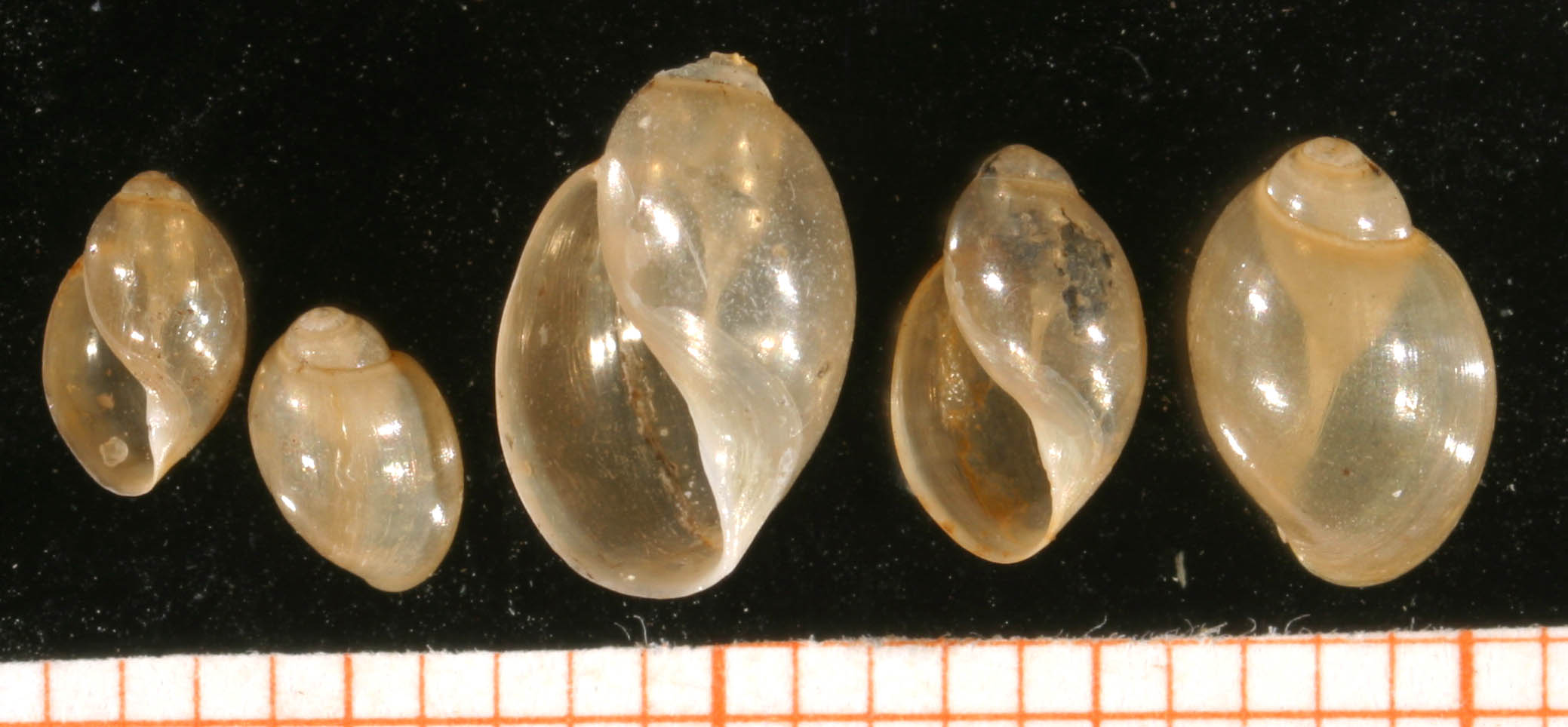
- Five shells of Physa fontinalis

Scientific classification
- Kingdom: Animalia
- Phylum: Mollusca
- Class: Gastropoda
- Superorder: Hygrophila
- Superfamily: Lymnaeoidea
- Family: Physidae
- Genus: Physa; Draparnaud, 1801

Type species
- Bulla fontinalis Linnaeus, 1758

Synonyms
- Laurentiphysa Taylor, 2003 (a junior synonym); Limnea (Physa) Draparnaud, 1801; Physa (Diastropha) Gray, 1840; Physa (Gyrina) Schumacher, 1817; Physa (Laurentiphysa) Taylor, 2003 (a junior synonym); Physa (Mediterraneophysa) Starobogatov & Budnikova, 1976 (a junior synonym); Physa (Physa) Draparnaud, 1801; Physa (Ussuriphysa) Starobogatov & Prozorova, 1989; Rivicola Fitzinger, 1833 (Invalid: junior objective synonym of Physa, with the same type species)

= Physa =

Genus of gastropods

Physa is a genus of small, left-handed or sinistral, air-breathing freshwater snails, aquatic pulmonate gastropod molluscs in the subfamily Physinae of the family Physidae.

These snails eat algae, diatoms and detritus.

== Anatomy ==
Members of the freshwater pulmonate family Physidae possess a complex of muscles that is unique amongst gastropods. This complex was given the name "physid musculature". The physid musculature has two main components, the physid muscle sensu stricto and the fan muscle. The physid musculature is responsible for a unique ability of physids to rapidly flick their shells from side to side — a reaction that frequently enables them to escape predation.

== Shell description ==
These small snails, like all the species in the family Physidae, have shells that are sinistral, which means that when the shell is held with the spire pointing up and the aperture facing the viewer, then the aperture is on the left-hand side.

The shells of Physa species have a long and large aperture, a pointed spire, and no operculum. The shells are thin and corneous, and rather transparent.

== Species ==
Species in the genus include:

- † Physa aplexoides Yen, 1969
- Physa arachleica Starobogatov & Prozorova, 1989
- † Physa aravanica Zharnyl'skaya, 1965
- † Physa aridi Mezzalira, 1974 – fossil from Brazil
- † Physa bacca Pan & Zhu, 2007 †
- † Physa beijiangensis W. Yü & X.-Q. Zhang, 1982 †
- † Physa boreaui Coquand, 1860
- † Physa bullatula White, 1886
- † Physa canadensis Whiteaves, 1885
- † Physa carletoni Meek, 1873
- † Physa cenomanensis Repelin, 1902
- † Physa cepedaensis Perrilliat & Vega in Perrilliat et al., 2008
- † Physa changleensis Youluo, 1978
- † Physa changzhouensis W. Yü, 1977
- Physa chippevarum (Taylor, 2003)
- Physa clarkei Ingersoll, 1875
- † Physa cokevillensis Yen, 1954
- † Physa conispira Yen & Reeside, 1946
- † Physa copei White, 1877
- Physa dalmatina Küster, 1844
- † Physa debilula Gu in Gu & Wang, 1989
- † Physa delecta Nicolas, 1891 †
- † Physa doeringi Doello-Jurado, 1927
- † Physa doliolum Matheron, 1843
- † Physa felix White, 1878
- Physa fontinalis (Linnaeus, 1758) – Fountain bladder snail – type species
- † Physa fuxinensis X.-H. Yu, 1987
- † Physa galei Russell, 1926
- † Physa galloprovincialis Matheron, 1843
- † Physa gaoyouensis W. Yü, 1977
- † Physa gardanensis Matheron, 1843
- † Physa globosa Yen, 1954
- † Physa gracilis Nicolas, 1891
- Physa hankensis Starobogatov & Prozorova, 1989
- † Physa jingangkouensis H.-Z. Pan, 1983
- † Physa kanabensis White, 1876
- † Physa lacryma F. Sandberger, 1871
- † Physa lacteana Russell, 1935
- † Physa liaoxiensis X.-H. Yu, 1987
- † Physa longiuscula Meek & Hayden, 1856
- Physa megalochlamys Taylor, 1988 – Cloaked physa
- Physa meneghinii Sacco, 1886 †
- † Physa mezzalirai Ghilardi, Carbonaro & Simone, 2011 – fossil from Brazil
- † Physa michaudii Matheron, 1843
- † Physa micra Yen & Reeside, 1946
- † Physa minima Repelin, 1902
- † Physa miqueli Caziot, 1905
- Physa mirollii Taylor, 2003
- † Physa montanensis Yen, 1951
- † Physa naucatica Zharnyl'skaya, 1965
- † Physa nebrascensis Meek & Hayden, 1856
- † Physa nisidai Suzuki, 1941
- † Physa nucleus Repelin, 1902
- † Physa obtusiconica X.-H. Yu, 1987
- †Physa orientalis G.-X. Zhu, 1980
- † Physa paravitimensis G.-X. Zhu, 1980
- † Physa patula Nicolas, 1891
- † Physa pijiagouensis X.-H. Yu, 1987
- Physa pumilia Conrad, 1834
- † Physa pygmaea Nicolas, 1891
- †Physa rhomboidea Meek & Hayden, 1856
- † Physa ringentis Youluo, 1978
- † Physa saxarubrensis Russell, 1957
- † Physa secalina Evans & Shumard, 1856
- † Physa shakengensis W. Yü & X.-Q. Zhang, 1982
- † Physa shandongensis H.-Z. Pan, 1983
- † Physa shantungensis Yen, 1969
- † Physa simeyrolsensis Repelin, 1902
- † Physa sinensis Yen, 1969
- Physa skinneri Taylor, 1954
- Physa streletzkajae Starobogatov & Budnikova, 1967
- † Physa subacuta Benoist, 1873
- † Physa subcylindrica Repelin, 1902
- Physa taslei Bourguignat, 1860
- † Physa tenuicostata H.-J. Wang, 1982
- † Physa usitata White, 1895
- Physa vernalis Taylor et Jokinen, 1984
- † Physa walcotti Yen & Reeside, 1946
- † Physa wealdiana Coquand, 1856
- † Physa wichmanni Parodiz, 1961
- † Physa zhuoxianensis Yü & Pan, 1982
- Physa sp., Lake Winnipeg Physa, lives in Manitoba in Canada. It was classified as endangered by COSEWIC. COSEWIC recommendation has been forwarded to the Minister of the Environment of Canada and a decision for listing at the List of Wildlife Species at Risk of the Canadian Species at Risk Act was pending in 2005.

Synonyms

- Physa acuta Draparnaud, 1805, Physa heterostropha (Say, 1817), Physa integra (Haldeman, 1841) and Physa natricina Taylor, 1988 are synonyms of Physella acuta (Draparnaud, 1805)
- Physa ancillaria (Say, 1825) – Pumpkin Physa: synonym of Physella ancillaria (Say, 1825) (original combination)
- Physa carolinae Wethington, Wise & Dillon, 2009: synonym of Physella carolinae (Wethington, Wise & Dillon, 2009)
- Physa concolor Haldeman, 1841: synonym of Physella gyrina (Say, 1821)
- Physa columbiana (Hemphill, 1890) is a synonym for Physella columbiana (Hemphill, 1890)
- Physa gyrina (Say, 1821) is a synonym for Physella gyrina (Say, 1821)
- Physa hordacea (I. Lea, 1864): synonym of Physella hordacea (I. Lea, 1864)
- Physa jennessi Dall, 1919: synonym of Beringophysa jennessi (Dall, 1919)
- Physa lordi (Baird, 1863): synonym of Physella lordi (Baird, 1863)
- Physa marmorata Guilding, 1828 – synonyms: Physa mosambiquensis Clessin, 1886 and Physa waterloti: synonym of Stenophysa marmorata (Guilding, 1828)
- Physa natricina Taylor, 1988: synonym of Physella natricina (D. W. Taylor, 1988)
- Physa nuttalli I. Lea, 1864: synonym of Physella gyrina (Say, 1821)
- Physa propingua (Tryon, 1865): synonym of Physella propinqua (Tryon, 1865)
- Physa sibirica Westerlund, 1876: synonym of Sibirenauta sibirica (Westerlund, 1876)
