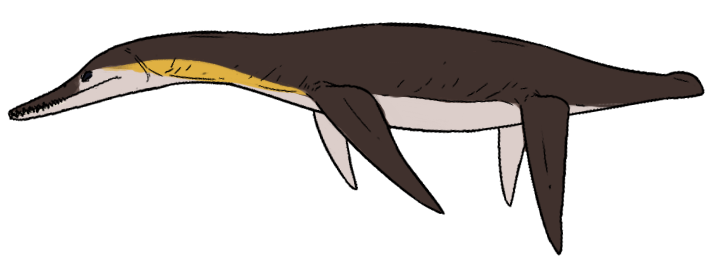
- Life restoration

Scientific classification
- Kingdom: Animalia
- Phylum: Chordata
- Class: Reptilia
- Superorder: †Sauropterygia
- Order: †Plesiosauria
- Superfamily: †Plesiosauroidea
- Family: †Polycotylidae
- Genus: †Sulcusuchus; Gasparini & Spalletti 1990
- Species: †S. erraini

Binomial name
- †Sulcusuchus erraini Gasparini & Spalletti 1990

= Sulcusuchus =

Sulcusuchus Temporal range: Maastrichtian 69-66 Ma

Extinct genus of reptiles

Sulcusuchus is a genus of polycotylid plesiosaur from the Maastrichtian of Argentina.

== Description ==
The type species Sulcusuchus erraini was named in 1990 by Zulma Brandoni de Gasparini and Luis Spalletti. It was at first considered to have been a dyrosaurid crocodile, hence its generic name: "trough crocodile". Its holotype, MLP 88-IV-10-1, was found in the Maastrichtian-Danian Coli Toro Formation, near Ingeniero Jacobacci, comprising a fragmentary mandibular ramus. The more complete specimen MPEF 650, was uncovered in the middle levels of the La Colonia Formation, which also dates to the Maastrichtian-Danian interval, and consists of a posterior left mandible fragment of about half a meter long with an associated jaw joint condyle of the skull, lower braincase, rear palate and middle snout fragment. The outer side of the mandible shows the trough, which would be exceptional for a crocodile. The mandibula and pterygoids show grooves that may have housed electro-sensitive organs, similar to modern cetaceans that inhabit estuarine and river locations. In 2025, a specimen of Sulcusuchus (MPEF-PV 11698) preserving 95 gastroliths was reported from the middle layers of the La Colonia Formation. Beyond the gastroliths, the specimen also includes fragmentary cranial (basioccipital, an isolated tooth and a fragmentary mandibular remains) and partial postcranial skeleton, yet undescribed. Some similarities were observed with a partial polycotylid (MML PV 43) from the Allen Formation.

== See also ==
- List of plesiosaur genera
- Timeline of plesiosaur research
