= Brasilestes =

Brasilestes Temporal range: Late Cretaceous

Scientific classification
- Kingdom: Animalia
- Phylum: Chordata
- Class: Mammalia
- Clade: Tribosphenida
- Genus: †Brasilestes; Castro et al., 2018
- Species: †B. stardusti

Binomial name
- †Brasilestes stardusti Castro et al., 2018

Extinct genus of mammals

Brasilestes is an extinct genus of mammals from the Late Cretaceous (Campanian-Maastrichtian) of South America. Its type species, B. stardusti, is named after David Bowie.

== Description ==
Brasilestes is noted to be relatively large for a Mesozoic mammal, with a length speculated at around 50 cm.

== Classification ==
Brasilestes is a tribosphenic mammal. It is tentatively assigned to Eutheria due to contemporary eutherian remains in the Adamantina Formation.

== Palaeoecology ==
Brasilestes occurs in the Adamantina Formation, alongside a plethora of dinosaur and notosuchian taxa. Contemporary mammals include eutherians, gondwanatheres and meridiolestidans.
