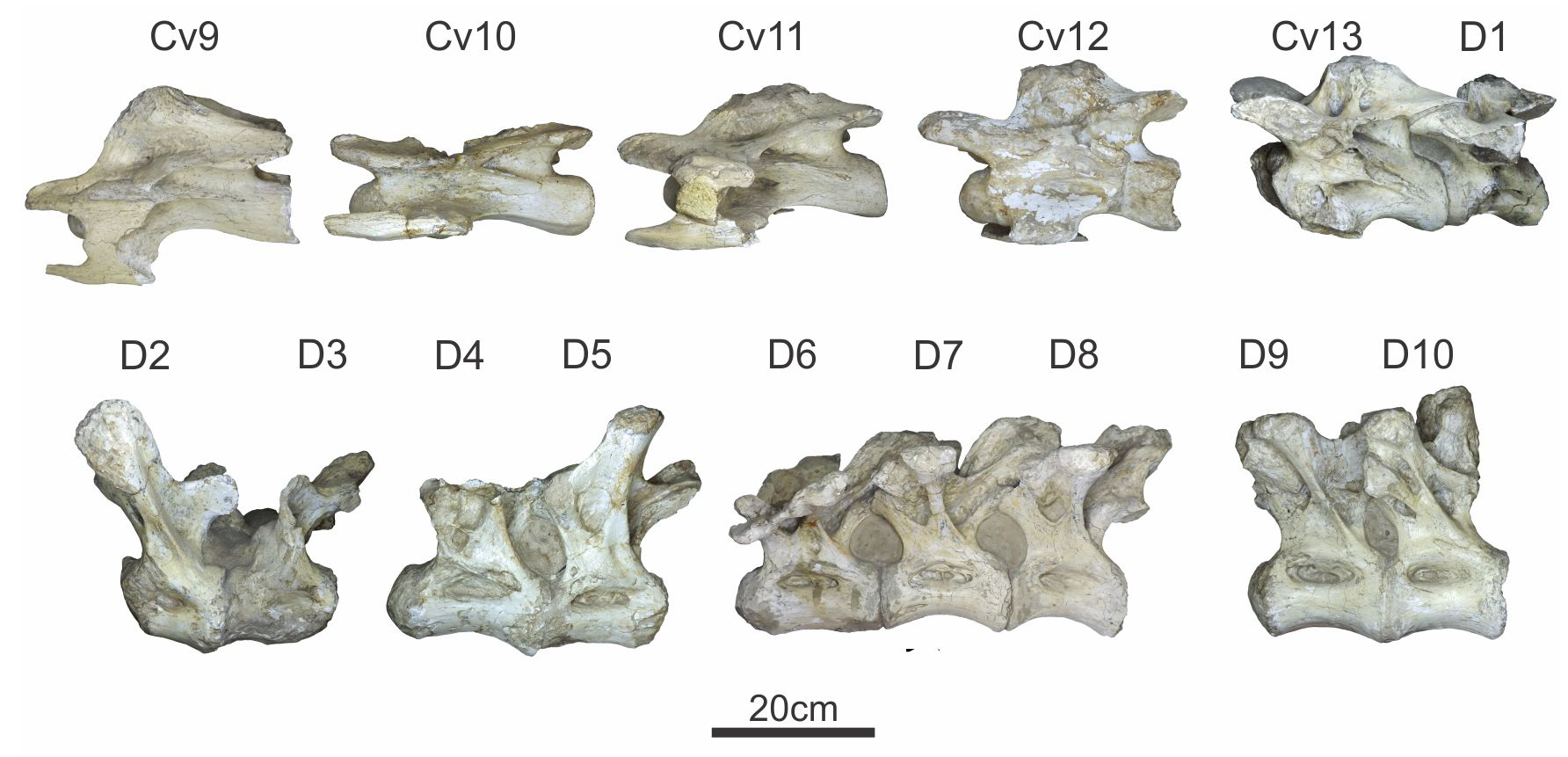
- Holotype cervical and dorsal vertebrae of the Trigonosaurus holotype

Scientific classification
- Kingdom: Animalia
- Phylum: Chordata
- Class: Reptilia
- Clade: Dinosauria
- Clade: Saurischia
- Clade: †Sauropodomorpha
- Clade: †Sauropoda
- Clade: †Macronaria
- Clade: †Titanosauria
- Family: †Saltasauridae
- Subfamily: †Saltasaurinae
- Genus: †Trigonosaurus; Campos et al. 2005
- Species: †T. pricei

Binomial name
- †Trigonosaurus pricei Campos et al. 2005

= Trigonosaurus =

Trigonosaurus Temporal range: Maastrichtian, 70–66 Ma

Extinct genus of dinosaurs

Trigonosaurus (meaning "triangle lizard" after Triangulo Mineiro, where it was found), is a genus of saltasaurid dinosaurs from the Maastrichtian Serra da Galga Formation of Brazil. The type species, Trigonosaurus pricei, was first described by Campos, Kellner, Bertini, and Santucci in 2005. It was based on two specimens, both consisting mainly of vertebrae. The two specimens were originally believed to have come from the same individual. However, one specimen was described as the holotype of Caieiria in 2022, while the holotype may have instead come from Baurutitan. Before its description, it was known as the "Peirópolis titanosaur", after the place it was found.

== History ==
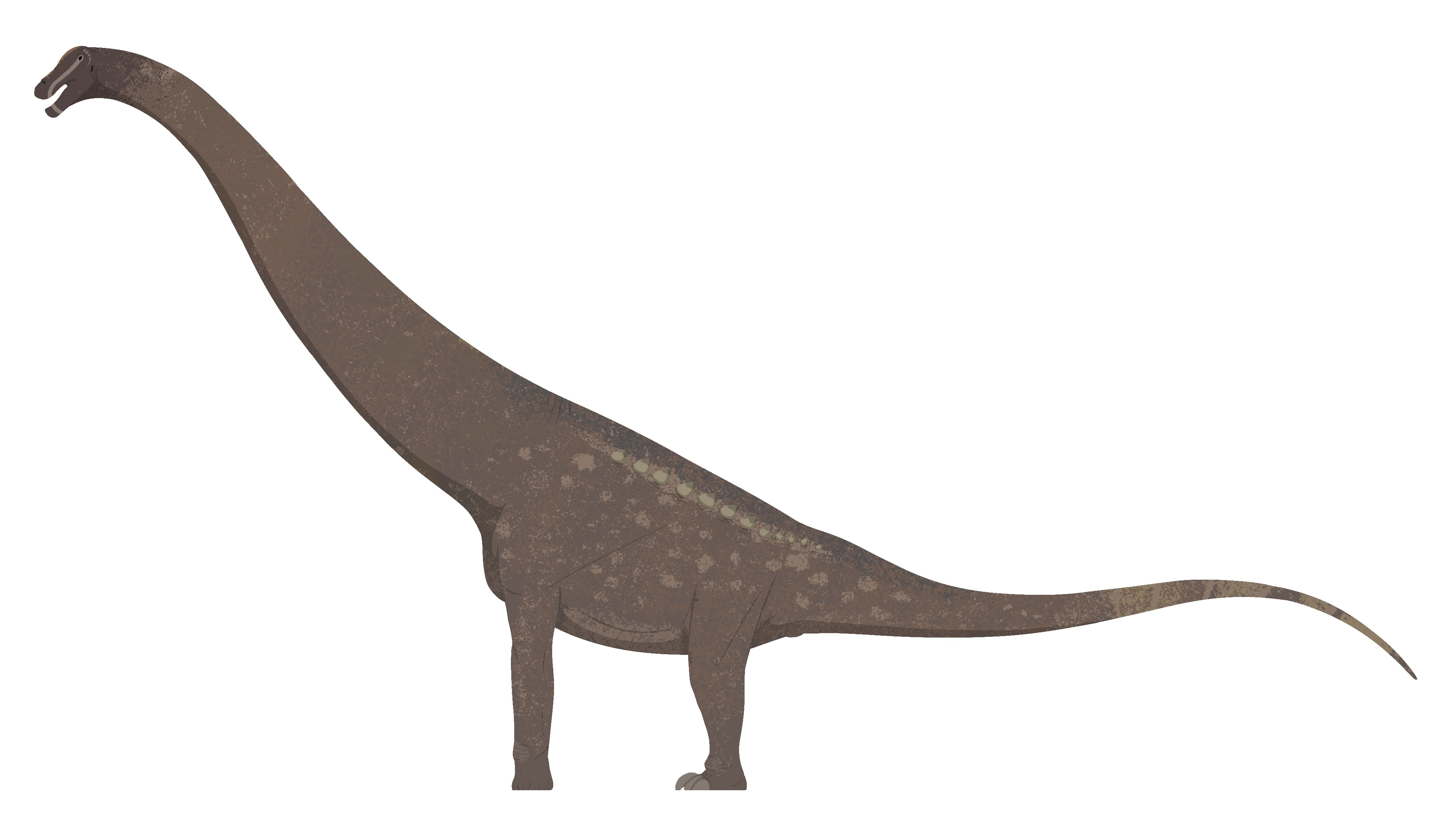
Speculative life restoration

From the 1940s to 1960s, Brazilian paleontologist Llewellyn Ivor Price excavated several series of titanosaur fossils in the "Caieira" locality of the Serra da Galga Formation in Minas Gerais, Brazil. Two of these, "Series B" or MCT 1488-R and "Series C" or MCT 1490-R, were named the holotypes of two titanosaur genera in 2005: Trigonosaurus and Baurutitan respectively. The describers of Trigonosaurus also referred a series of caudal vertebrae, MCT 1719-R, as the paratype of their new genus. Further titanosaur fossils from the BR-262 site of the same locality were reported by Silva Junior and colleagues in 2022, and in light of this new evidence, reconsidered MCT 1488-R to be a specimen of Baurutitan, thus synonymizing Trigonosaurus with it. They also separated the caudal vertebrae (paratype) from Trigonosaurus and described it as the holotype of a new genus and species of titanosaur, Caieiria allocaudata. However, not all researchers have accepted the conclusion that Trigonosaurus is a synonym of Baurutitan; John Fronimos, in 2023, did not follow the proposed synonymy due to the differencess between the first caudal vertebrae of the two taxa.

== Palaeobiology ==
=== Palaeoecology ===
Owing to its high neck elevation, Trigonosaurus was a high browser that fed on the tops of small trees as well as on bushes.
