= Mariliabatrachus =

Mariliabatrachus Temporal range: Campanian, 83–72 Ma

Scientific classification
- Kingdom: Animalia
- Phylum: Chordata
- Class: Amphibia
- Order: Anura
- Genus: †Mariliabatrachus; Santos, Carvalho & Zaher, 2023
- Species: †M. navai

Binomial name
- †Mariliabatrachus navai Santos, Carvalho & Zaher, 2023

Extinct genus of amphibians

Mariliabatrachus was an extinct genus of frog described based on several fossils found in the Campanian Adamantina Formation, Bauru Group, Brazil. The holotype comprises a postmetamorphic adult individual measuring about 38.5 mm (1.52 in). The skull roof of Mariliabatrachus is very distinctive and characterized by the presence of an azygous frontoparietal bearing ornamentations in the form of shallow grooves and two rounded supraorbital flanges laterally projected. The genus is known from only one species, Mariliabatrachus navai.

Phylogenetic analyses suggest that Mariliabatrachus was an early neobatrachian with putative taxonomic affinities with hyloids, but its phylogenetic relationships remain still uncertain.
