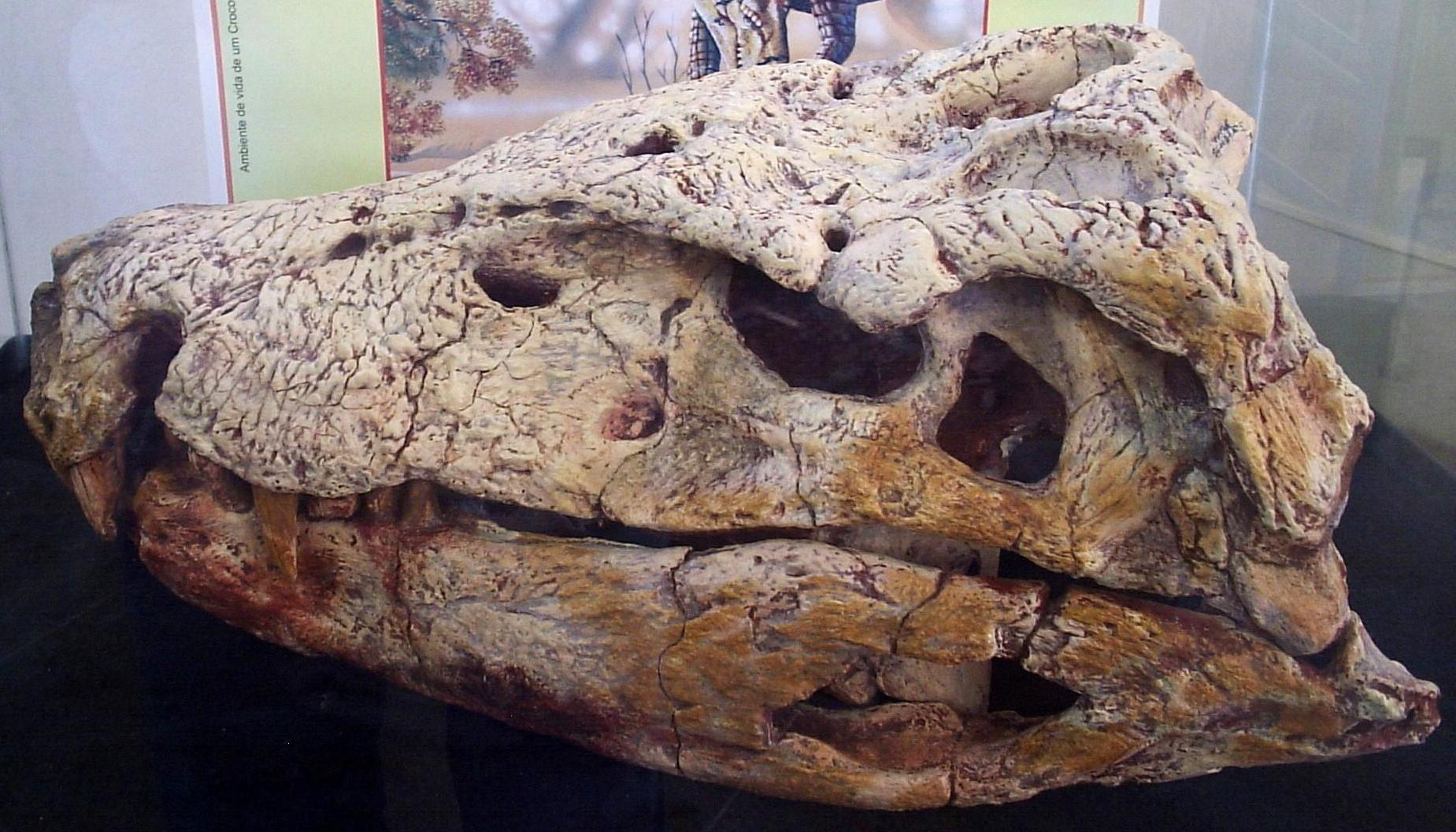
- Skull of Baurusuchus salgadoensis

Scientific classification
- Kingdom: Animalia
- Phylum: Chordata
- Class: Reptilia
- Clade: Archosauria
- Clade: Pseudosuchia
- Clade: Crocodylomorpha
- Clade: †Notosuchia
- Clade: †Sebecosuchia
- Family: †Baurusuchidae
- Subfamily: †Baurusuchinae; Montefeltro et al., 2011

Genera
- †Aphaurosuchus; †Aplestosuchus; †Baurusuchus; †Pabwehshi; †Stratiotosuchus

= Baurusuchinae =

Baurusuchinae Temporal range: Campanian, 83.6–72.1 Ma

Extinct subfamily of reptiles

Baurusuchinae is a subfamily of baurusuchid crocodyliforms from the Late Cretaceous of Brazil and Pakistan. Named in 2011, it contains the baurusuchids Aphaurosuchus, Aplestosuchus, Baurusuchus, Pabwehshi and Stratiotosuchus. Baurusuchinae is one of two subfamilies of Baurusuchidae, the other being Pissarrachampsinae.

Several features distinguish baurusuchines from pissarrachampsines and help diagnose the subfamily. The orbital section of the jugal is twice the depth of the infratemporal portion. There are depressions on the quadrate running from top to bottom. The condyle on the side of the quadrate is almost as wide as the middle condyle. The bottom of the choanal septum is smooth. The ridged border of the middle face of the angular does not overcome the front of the mandibular fenestra. The frontal bone, situated behind the prefrontals, is very wide. The skull of baurusuchines is relatively straight when viewed from above.

Baurusuchinae is a stem-based taxon formally defined in 2021 as the most inclusive clade containing Baurusuchus pachecoi, but not Pissarrachampsa sera.

Baurusuchines are only found in the Bauru Basin of Brazil, and are therefore endemic to the Bauru Group. Because of their restricted stratigraphic and geographic range, baurusuchines were probably sympatric, living in the same environment at the same time. Alternatively, they may have been stratigraphically separated, meaning that each species lived at a slightly different time.
