= Brasileosaurus =

Brasileosaurus Temporal range: Maastrichtian ~72–68 Ma

Scientific classification
- Domain: Eukaryota
- Kingdom: Animalia
- Phylum: Chordata
- Class: Reptilia
- Clade: Archosauria
- Clade: Pseudosuchia
- Clade: Crocodylomorpha
- Clade: Crocodyliformes
- Clade: †Notosuchia
- Family: †Notosuchidae
- Genus: †Brasileosaurus; Huene, 1931
- Species: †B. pachecoi

Binomial name
- †Brasileosaurus pachecoi Huene, 1931

Extinct genus of reptiles

Brasileosaurus (meaning "Brazil lizard") is a genus of notosuchid notosuchian from the Late Cretaceous Adamantina Formation of Brazil. The type species is B. pachecoi, discovered by the Brazilian Eng. Joviano Pacheco and described by the prolific German paleontologist Friedrich von Huene in 1931.

Brasileosaurus is not to be confused with the mesosaur Brazilosaurus.

== Classification ==
Although originally classified as a coelurosaur in the original description, it was later recognized as being a crocodylomorph, possibly synonymous with Uruguaysuchus. In his description of Sebecus, George Gaylord Simpson assigned Brasileosaurus to Notosuchidae, noting similarities with members of Mesoeucrocodylia.
