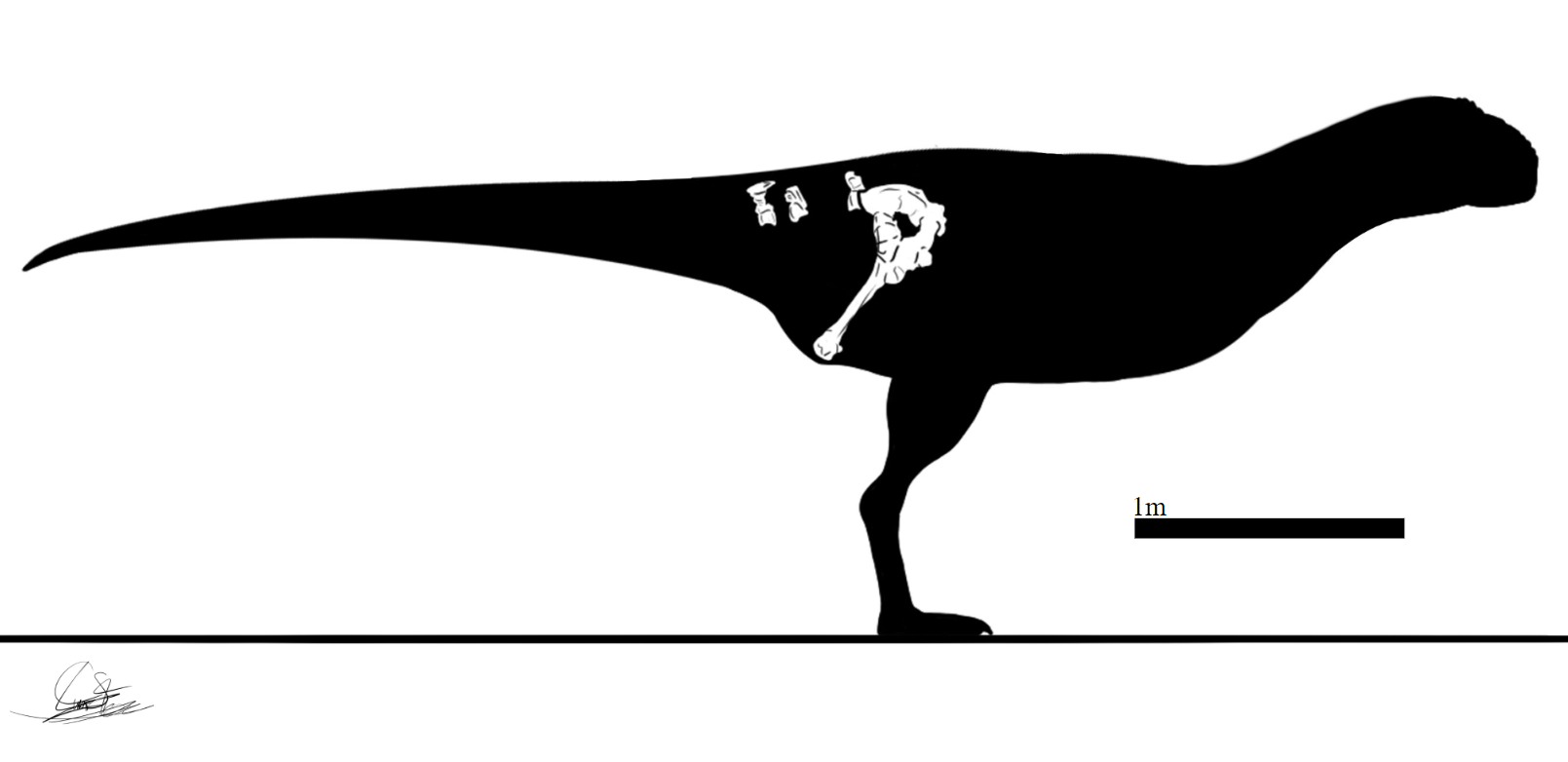
- Skeletal diagram of Kurupi itaata

Scientific classification
- Kingdom: Animalia
- Phylum: Chordata
- Class: Reptilia
- Clade: Dinosauria
- Clade: Saurischia
- Clade: Theropoda
- Family: †Abelisauridae
- Genus: †Kurupi; Iori et al., 2021

Type species
- †Kurupi itaata Iori et al., 2021

= Kurupi itaata =

Kurupi Temporal range: Late Cretaceous (Maastrichtian), 70–66 Ma

Genus of abelisaurid dinosaurs

Kurupi itaata is an extinct species of abelisaurid theropod dinosaurs from the Late Cretaceous Marília Formation of Brazil. It is the only species in the genus Kurupi.

== Etymology ==
The genus is named for Kurupi, a god of fertility and sexuality from Guaraní mythology. This name was chosen to reference the discovery of the holotype specimen, MPMA 27-0001/02, near a love hotel ("Motel Paraíso" ["Paradise Motel"]). The specific name combines the Tupi words ita, meaning rock, and atã, meaning hard, in reference to the heavily cemented rocks in which the holotype was found.

== Description ==
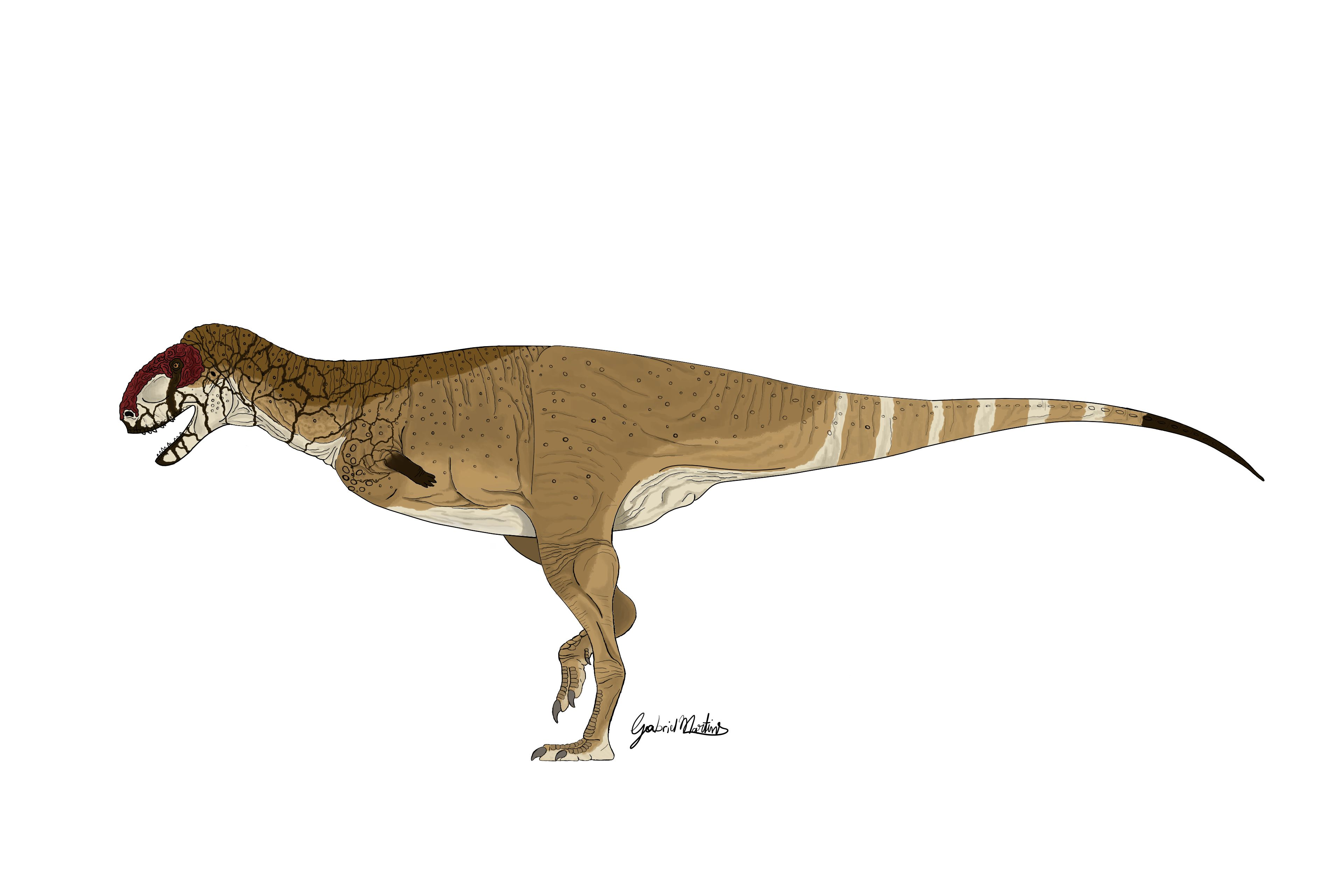
Speculative life restoration

The holotype consists of three caudal vertebrae and a partial pelvic girdle, belonging to an animal around 5 metres (16 ft) long. It would have been a cursorial, stiff-tailed hunter.

== Classification ==
In their 2021 description, Iori et al. assigned Kurupi to the Abelisauridae, but its precise relationships are uncertain because a phylogenetic analysis only generates a massive polytomy of abelisaurids more derived than Spectrovenator.
