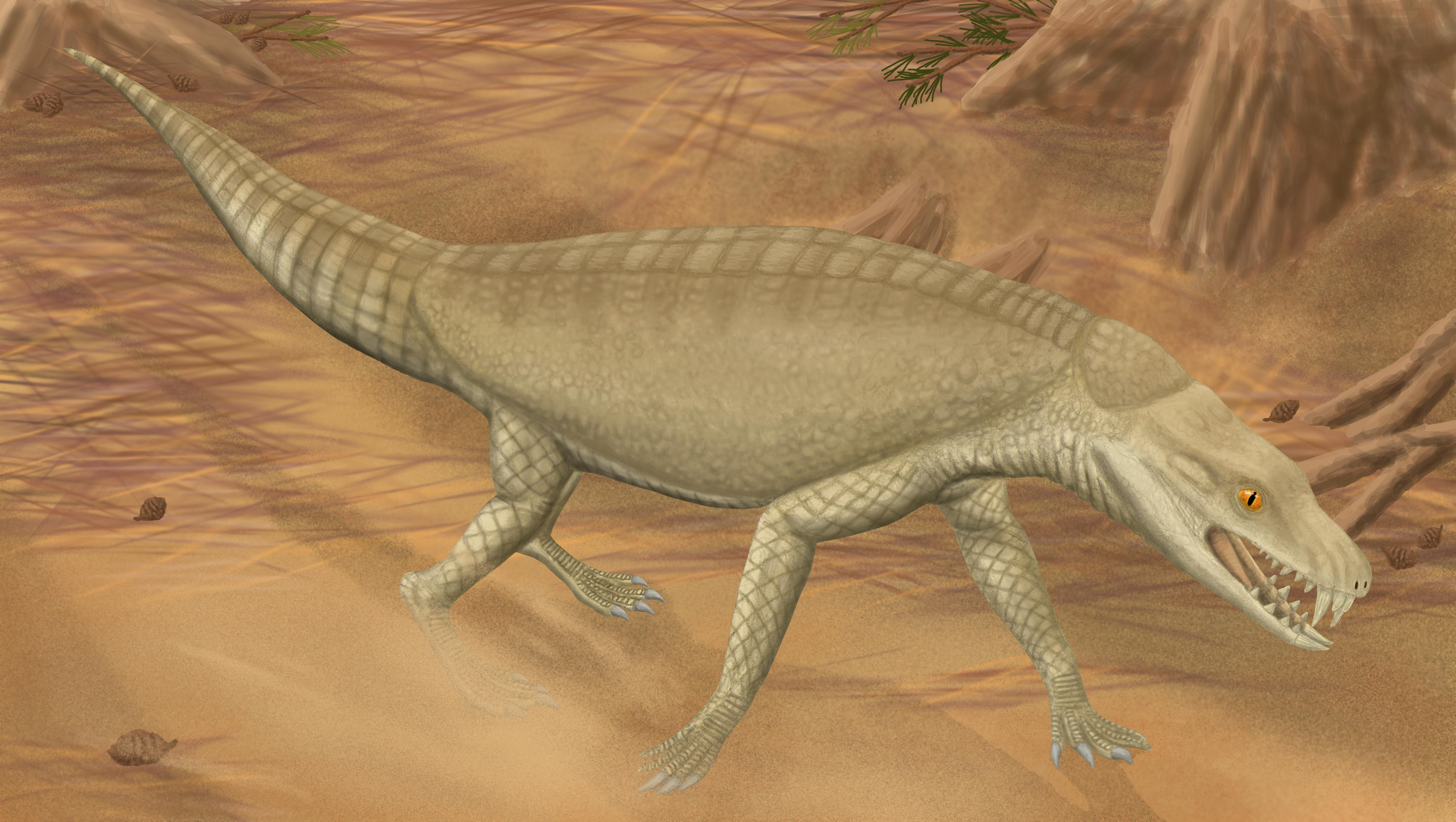
- Life restoration of Armadillosuchus arrudai

Scientific classification
- Kingdom: Animalia
- Phylum: Chordata
- Class: Reptilia
- Clade: Pseudosuchia
- Clade: Crocodylomorpha
- Clade: †Notosuchia
- Clade: †Sphagesauria
- Family: †Sphagesauridae; Kuhn, 1968

Genera
- †Adamantinasuchus; †Labidiosuchus; †Yacarerani; †Sphagesaurinae; †Armadillosuchus; †Caryonosuchus; †Sphagesaurus; †Caipirasuchinae; †Caipirasuchus; †Morrinhosuchus

= Sphagesauridae =

Sphagesauridae Temporal range: 90–66 Ma Turonian – Maastrichtian

Extinct family of reptiles

Sphagesauridae is a Gondwanan family of mesoeucrocodylians that lived during the Late Cretaceous. It was a clade of terrestrial crocodilians that evolved very mammal-like teeth and jaws. Both Sphagesaurus and Adamantinasuchus have been reported from Brazilian deposits assigned to the Turonian–Santonian.

== Taxonomy ==
In a 2026 review of the large-bodied sphagesaurids, Pedro Akira Kitayama and Reinaldo José Bertini proposed treating Armadillosuchus arrudai and Caryonosuchus pricei as junior synonyms of Sphagesaurus huenei. They argued that the diagnostic differences previously used to separate these taxa were not sufficiently unambiguous, interpreting them in terms of intraspecific variation, fossil deformation and differing assessments of dental characters. The authors explicitly regarded the proposed synonymy as provisional and open to reassessment with additional well-preserved fossils or quantitative morphological analyses.
