= Uberaba Formation =

Geologic formation in Brazil

- Stratigraphic range: Campanian; ~84.9–70.6 Ma
- Type: Geological formation
- Unit of: Bauru Group
- Underlies: Marília Formation
- Overlies: Adamantina Formation

Lithology
- Primary: Limestone, sandstone, conglomerate

Location
- Coordinates: 19.8°S 47.9°W
- Approximate paleocoordinates: 24.5°S 29.2°W
- Region: Minas Gerais
- Country: Brazil
- Extent: Bauru Sub-basin, Paraná Basin

Type section
- Named for: Uberaba
- Uberaba Formation (Brazil)

The Uberaba Formation is a Campanian geologic formation belonging to the Bauru Group of the Bauru Sub-basin, Paraná Basin located in Minas Gerais state of southeastern Brazil. The Uberaba Formation, intercalating the fossiliferous older Adamantina and younger Marília Formation, comprises limestones, sandstones, and conglomerates, often cemented by calcite with volcaniclastic sediments. The formation interfingers with the Adamantina Formation.

Dinosaur remains are among the fossils that have been recovered from the formation, although none have yet been referred to a specific genus. A megaraptoran similar to Aerosteon is known from the formation.

== See also ==
- List of dinosaur-bearing rock formations
- List of stratigraphic units with indeterminate dinosaur fossils
- Anacleto Formation, contemporaneous Lagerstätte of the Neuquén Basin, Argentina
- Los Llanos Formation, contemporaneous ooliferous formation of the Sierra de Los Llanos, Argentina
- Lago Colhué Huapí Formation, contemporaneous fossiliferous formation of the Golfo San Jorge Basin, Argentina
