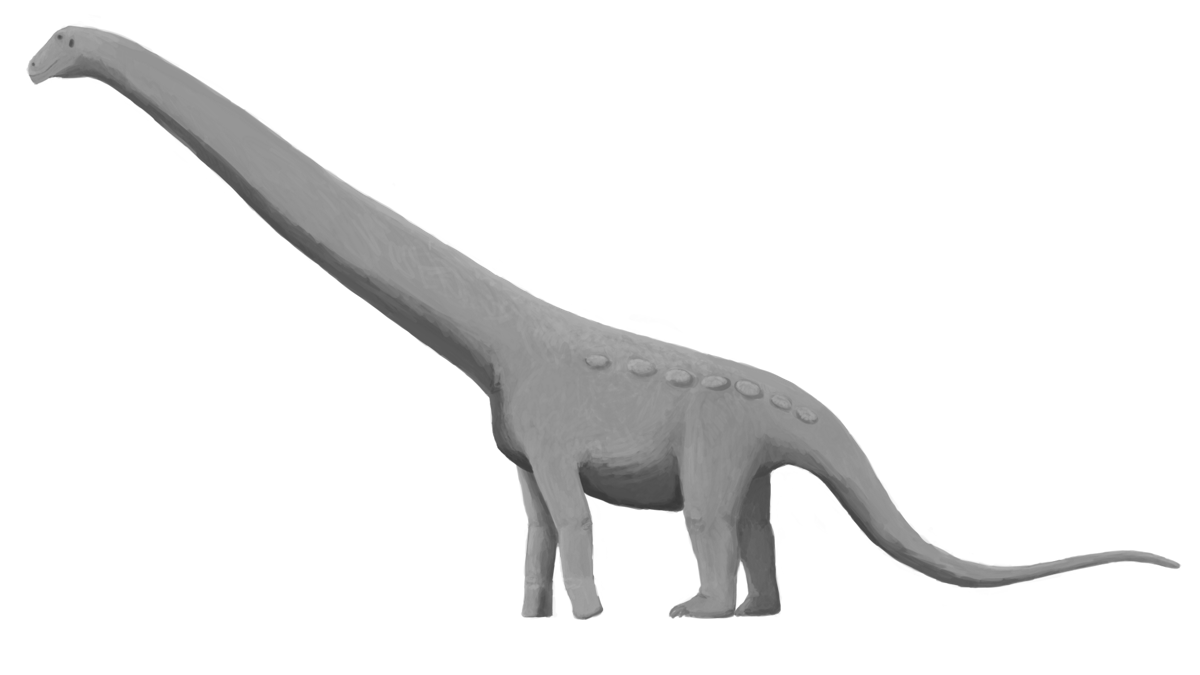
- Life reconstruction of Aeolosaurus rionegrinus

Scientific classification
- Kingdom: Animalia
- Phylum: Chordata
- Class: Reptilia
- Clade: Dinosauria
- Clade: Saurischia
- Clade: †Sauropodomorpha
- Clade: †Sauropoda
- Clade: †Macronaria
- Clade: †Titanosauria
- Clade: †Lithostrotia
- Clade: †Aeolosaurini
- Genus: †Aeolosaurus; Powell, 1987

Type species
- †Aeolosaurus rionegrinus Powell, 1987

Other species
- †A. colhuehuapensis Casal et al., 2007

= Aeolosaurus =

Aeolosaurus Temporal range: Late Cretaceous 83–66 Ma

Extinct genus of dinosaurs

Aeolosaurus (/ˌiːoʊloʊˈsɔːrəs/; "Aeolus' lizard") is a genus of titanosaurian sauropod dinosaur from the Late Cretaceous Period of what is now South America. Like most sauropods, it would have been a quadrupedal herbivore with a long neck and tail. Aeolosaurus is well known for a titanosaur, as it is represented by the remains of several individuals belonging to at least two species. However, like most titanosaurs, no remains of the skull are known. The holotype of Aeolosaurus rionegrinus consists of a series of seven tail vertebrae, as well as parts of both forelimbs and the right hindlimb. It was discovered in the Angostura Colorada Formation in Argentina, which dates from the Campanian stage of the Late Cretaceous, about 83 to 74 million years ago. The species A. maximus was transferred over to the new genus Arrudatitan in 2021.

== Etymology ==
This dinosaur is named after the Greek mythological figure Aeolus, Keeper of the Winds in Homer's Odyssey, because of the frequent winds that blow across Patagonia, where the remains were found. The generic name also includes the Greek sauros ('lizard'), the traditional suffix used in dinosaur names. The specific name (A. rionegrinus), refers to its location, in the Rio Negro Province of Argentina. Both genus and species were named and described by Argentine paleontologist Jaime Powell in 1987.

== Provenance ==
Aeolosaurus is a widespread genus of titanosaur known from the Late Cretaceous of South America. Fossils have been collected from the Allen, Angostura Colorada, Lago Colhué Huapí, and Los Alamitos Formations of Argentina and the Serra da Galga Formation of Brazil. All Aeolosaurus fossils are from the Campanian and Maastrichtian ages of the Cretaceous period.

== History ==
The type species of Aeolosaurus, Aeolosaurus rionegrinus, was originally named along with the genus in the doctoral thesis of Jaime E. Powell. However, according to the ICZN, names from dissertations are not valid, so it was not formally named until it was published the following year. Powell's thesis was ultimately published in 2003, which is sometimes incorrectly cited as having named the genus. In 2004, Aeolosaurus and Gondwanatitan were recognized as forming a new group of titanosaurs, which was named Aeolosaurini. In 2007, a second species, A. colhuehuapensis was named, also from Patagonia. A third species, A. maximus, was named in 2011. A. maximus was moved to the genus Arrudatitan in 2021.

== Description ==
Like all sauropods, Aeolosaurus was a large, long-necked, quadrupedal herbivore. A. rionegrinus was roughly 14 meters (46 ft) long and 6 tonnes (6.6 short tons) in weight according to Gregory S. Paul. In 2020 Molina-Pérez and Larramendi gave a larger estimation of 18.1 meters (60 ft) and 14.7 tonnes (16.2 short tons). A. rionegrinus was heavily built for a titanosaur, with limb bones similar in robustness to those of Saltasaurus.

Aeolosaurs, Aeolosaurus in particular, have very distinctive caudal vertebrae. The genus Aeolosaurus is diagnosed by the shared presence of down-curved prezygapophyses on its anterior caudal vertebrae and chevrons from the anterior and middle portions of the tail with concave posterodorsal surfaces that contain double articular facets. The caudal vertebrae of Aeolosaurus and the related genus Gondwanatitan share anteriorly-inclined neural spines in the anterior caudal vertebrae. The vertebrae from the middle part of its tail had elongated centra. Aeolosaurus had vertebral lateral fossae that resembled shallow depressions. Fossae that similarly resemble shallow depressions are known from Saltasaurus, Alamosaurus, Malawisaurus, and Gondwanatitan. Its middle tail vertebrae's neural spines angled anteriorly when the vertebrae are aligned. These vertebrae resemble those of Cedarosaurus, Venenosaurus, and Gondwanatitan. The tail of Aeolosaurus was apparently curved strongly downward, a trait likely shared with other members of Aeolosaurini. This curvature would likely have led to the posterior portion of the tail being very low to the ground, though likely not touching it. The curved base of the tail may have enabled the m. caudofemoralis longus, which extended from the femur to the tail vertebrae, to exert more force while retracting the hindlimb.

Aeolosaurus, like many lithostrotian titanosaurs, bore osteoderms. However, its osteoderms were unusual and most closely resemble those of Mendozasaurus. As in all osteoderm-bearing titanosaurs, the osteoderms were probably arranged in one or two rows along the flanks.

== Classification ==
Aeolosaurus is most closely related to the genera Gondwanatitan and Panamericansaurus. Together with Gondwanatitan, it defines the clade Aeolosaurini. The two Aeolosaurus species from Argentina, A. rionegrinus and A. colhuehuapensis, appear to be more closely related to each other than to the Brazilian species A. maximus.

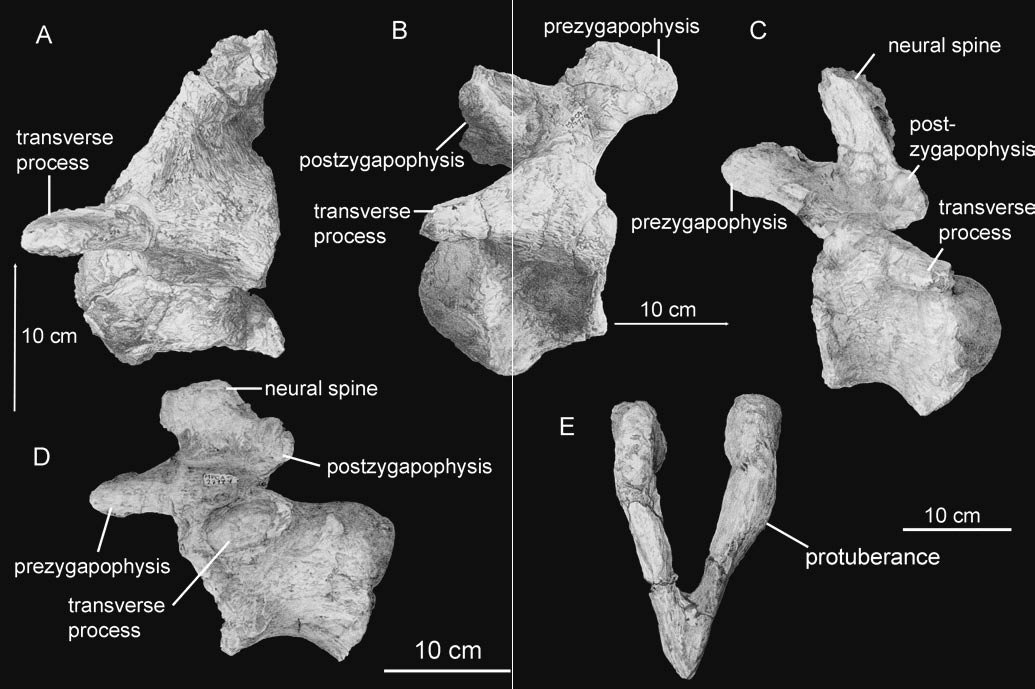
Aeolosaurus sp. tail vertebrae

The classification of Aeolosaurus and its relatives is heavily based on features of the tail vertebrae, which are the only bones preserved in most aeolosaurs.

Aeolosaurus has been included in several cladistic analyses. The phylogeny of Aeolosaurini here is based on Gallina and Otero 2015, with the application of clade names according to their phylogenetic definitions.

- Aeolosaurini
  - Rapetosaurus
  - - - Overosaurus
      - - Gondwanatitan
        - Aeolosaurus
    - Rinconsauria
      - Rinconsaurus
      - - Muyelensaurus
        - - - Laplatasaurus
            - Uberabatitan
          - - Bonitasaura
            - Lognkosauria
              - Futalognkosaurus
              - Mendozasaurus

=== Species ===
There are currently two named valid species of Aeolosaurus, as well as several specimens that have been referred to the genus but not given a species. In addition, Gondwanatitan faustoi, the closest known relative of the genus, has been proposed to represent an additional species of Aeolosaurus, as Aeolosaurus faustoi. However, Gondwanatitan is typically considered a distinct genus.

- Aeolosaurus rionegrinus is the type species of Aeolosaurus. It is known from a single specimen, MJG-R 1, that consists of seven caudal vertebrae and many appendicular elements. Its limb bones suggest that it was heavily built, similar to Saltasaurus. It is found in the Angostura Colorada Formation of Argentina.
- Aeolosaurus colhuehuapensis is known only from 21 caudal vertebrae. It is found in the Lago Colhue Huapi Formation of Argentina.

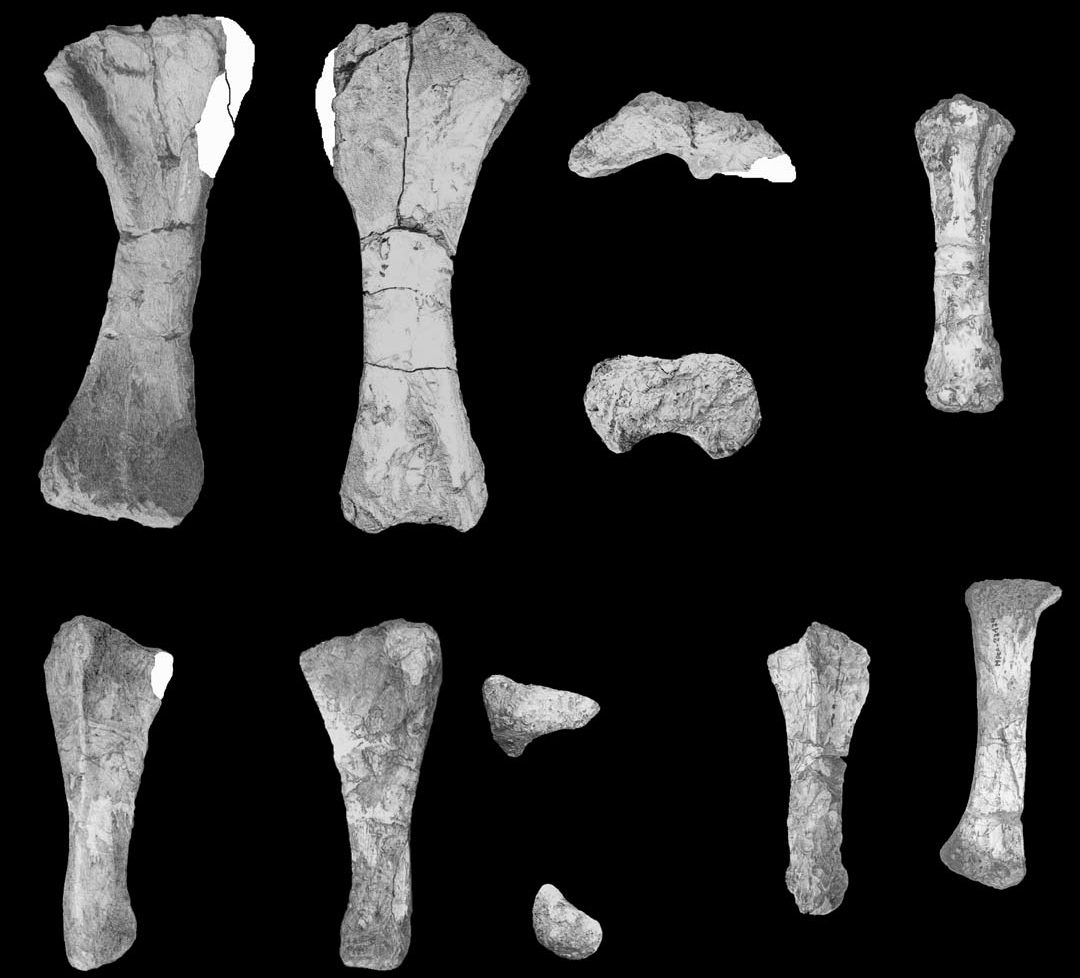
Aeolosaurus sp. forelimb elements

Another specimen, described in 1993, consists of five tail vertebrae, and some bones from the forelimb and pelvis. Since there are two right ulna (forearm) bones, the specimen must consist of at least two individuals. These bones were also associated with two osteoderms, or bony armor plates, providing evidence that this dinosaur was armored. This specimen is from the Allen Formation of Rio Negro, dating back about 70 to 68 million years ago to the middle Maastrichtian stage. While this specimen bears features that characterize the genus Aeolosaurus, it is from a younger time period and shows enough differences that the authors recognized it as a possible second species. Additional material from the same quarry, described in 2013, shows that the quarry contained the remains at least three individuals of Aeolosaurus.

Another partial skeleton, including four more tail vertebrae and material from both limbs on the left side of the body, was described in 1997. This was recovered from the Los Alamitos Formation of Rio Negro, which falls between the other two dates. This specimen was also referred to the genus Aeolosaurus, but not to the species A. rionegrinus, and may represent a third species.

However, since the genus Aeolosaurus is not well known, the authors chose not to formally name either of these possible new species. For now, they are both simply known as "Aeolosaurus sp." Future discoveries may give scientists more information on variation within the genus, and show that all of the above specimens belong to A. rionegrinus, or that they merit being formally named.

A middle caudal vertebra from the Serra da Galga Formation, CPP 248, cannot be evaluated for any diagnostic features of the genus Aeolosaurus. However, because it clearly does not belong to Gondwanatitan, it is most likely that this vertebra represents Aeolosaurus, a genus otherwise unknown from the Serra da Galga Formation.

Another series of 15 tail vertebrae was assigned to Aeolosaurus in the original description, but it was later determined that the series does not belong to this genus, as it lacks several features found in the other specimens of Aeolosaurus.

== Paleoecology ==
Aeolosaurus lived during the Campanian and Maastrichtian ages of the Late Cretaceous and shared its environment with hadrosaurs. The unnamed Allen Formation species of Aeolosaurus inhabited an environment that it shared with five other species of titanosaur, including Rocasaurus muniozi, as well as hadrosaurs and ankylosaurs.

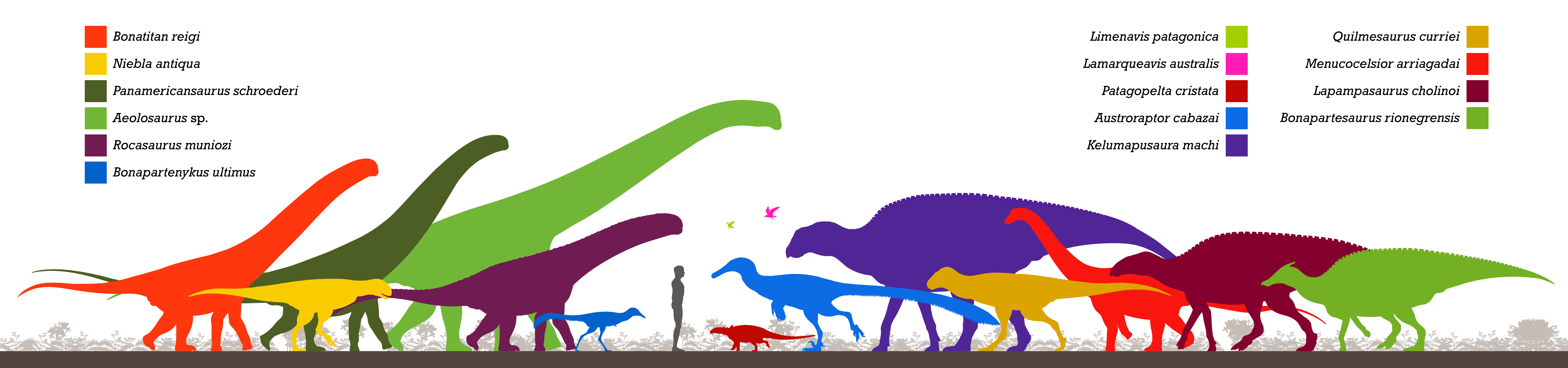
Aeolosaurus compared to dinosaur fauna from the Allen Formation (Aeolosaurus in light green, fourth from left)
