= Physa aridi =

Physa aridi Temporal range: Senonian

Scientific classification
- Domain: Eukaryota
- Kingdom: Animalia
- Phylum: Mollusca
- Class: Gastropoda
- Superorder: Hygrophila
- Family: Physidae
- Genus: Physa
- Species: †P. aridi

Binomial name
- †Physa aridi Mezzalira, 1974

Extinct species of gastropod

Physa aridi is a fossil species of air-breathing freshwater snail, an extinct aquatic pulmonate gastropod mollusc in the family Physidae. This species has a small, left-handed (or sinistral) shell, as is always the case in this family. Physa aridi dates from the Senonian (Upper Cretaceous) of the Bauru Group, in São Paulo state, Brazil.
