= Bauru Group =

Geological group of Brazil

- Stratigraphic range: Late Cretaceous (Coniacian-Maastrichtian); ~89–66 Ma
- Type: Group
- Unit of: Bauru Sub-basin
- Sub-units: Araçatuba, Adamantina, Uberaba, Marília, Vale do Rio do Peixe, Cambambe, São José do Rio Preto and Presidente Prudente Formations
- Underlies: Alluvium
- Overlies: Caiuá Group

Lithology
- Primary: Sandstone
- Other: Conglomerate, siltstone, mudstone, coal

Location
- Coordinates: 19.7°S 48.0°W
- Approximate paleocoordinates: 24.4°S 29.2°W
- Region: Minas Gerais, São Paulo, General Salgado, Itapecuru-Mirim, Mato Grosso
- Country: Brazil
- Extent: Paraná Basin

Type section
- Named for: Bauru
- Bauru Group (Brazil)

The Bauru Group is a geological group of the Bauru Sub-basin, Paraná Basin in Minas Gerais, São Paulo, General Salgado, Itapecuru-Mirim, Mato Grosso, Brazil whose strata date back to the Late Cretaceous. Dinosaur remains are among the fossils that have been recovered from the formation.

== Subdivisions ==
According to a 2016 study:

The Bauru Basin covers an area of approximately 379.362 km2 located almost exclusively in Brazil.., with selected outcrops in Northeastern Paraguay (Fúlfaro, 1996). This Cretaceous sedimentary succession reflects changing nonmarine environments, such as eolian, lacustrine, fluvial and alluvial fans.

The Bauru Group was divided by Fernandes and Coimbra (1996) in four formations, namely Adamantina, Uberaba, Araçatuba and Marília. In 1998, Fernandes revised the group and recognize six formations, Uberaba, Vale do Rio do Peixe, Araçatuba, São José do Rio Preto, Presidente Prudente and Marília. The Adamantina Formation was divided in Vale do Rio do Peixe, São José do Rio Preto and Presidente Prudente Formations.

== Molluscan paleofauna ==
=== Gastropoda ===
- †Physa aridi Mezzalira, 1974
- †Physa mezzalirai Ghilardi, Carbonaro & Simone, 2011
- †Viviparus souzai Mezzalira, 1974

=== Bivalvia ===
- †Anodontites freitasi Mezzalira, 1974
- †Anodontites pricei Mezzalira, 1974
- †Diplodon arrudai Mezzalira, 1974
- †Florenceia peiropolensis Mezzalira, 1974
- †Itaimbea priscus (Ihering, 1913)
- †Monocondylaea cominatoi Mezzalira, 1974
- †Sancticarolis tolentinoi Mezzalira, 1974
- †Taxodontites paulistanensis (Mezzalira, 1974)

== See also ==
- List of dinosaur-bearing rock formations
- Areado Group of the São Francisco Basin
- Santana Group of the Araripe Basin
