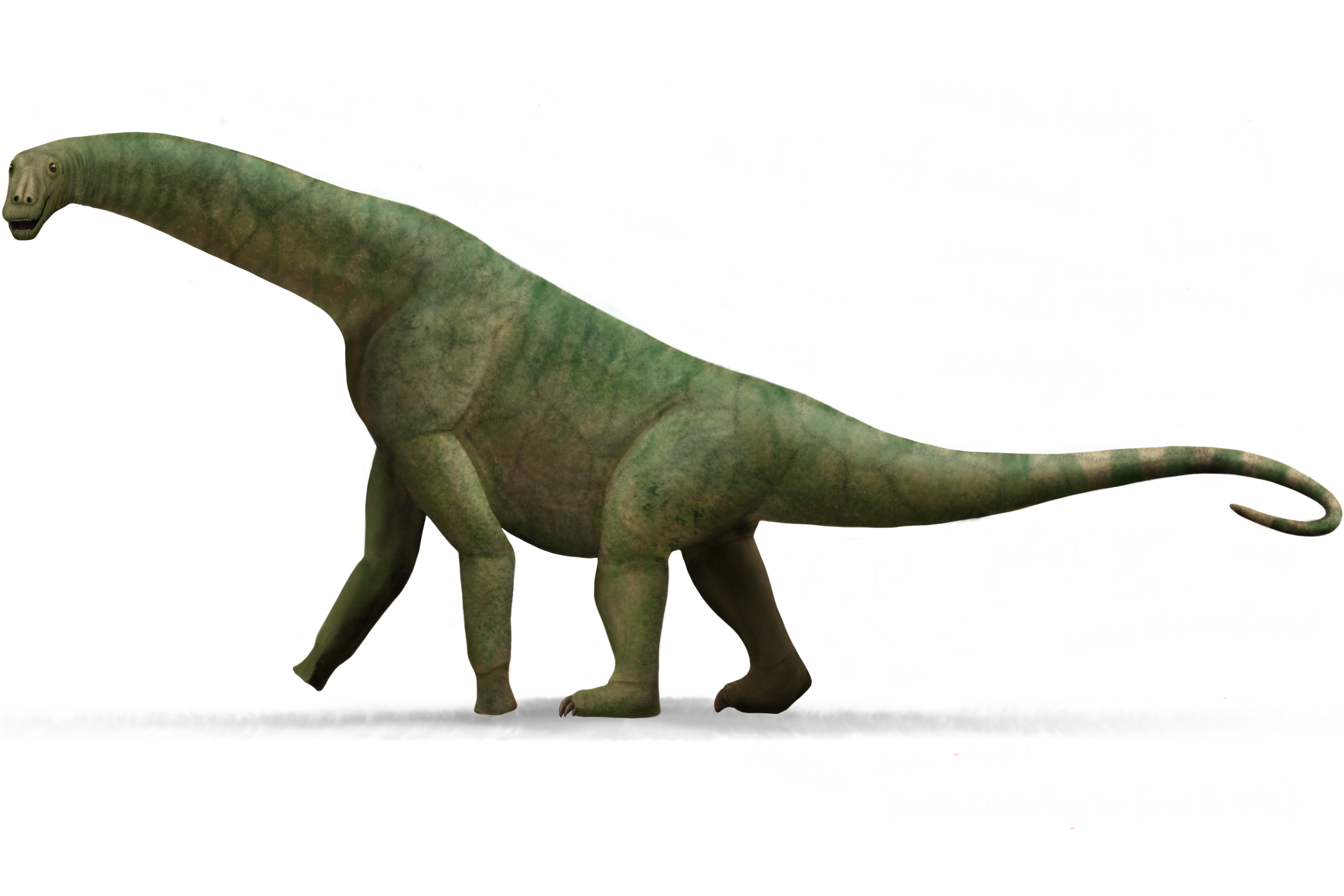
- Life restoration

Scientific classification
- Kingdom: Animalia
- Phylum: Chordata
- Class: Reptilia
- Clade: Dinosauria
- Clade: Saurischia
- Clade: †Sauropodomorpha
- Clade: †Sauropoda
- Clade: †Macronaria
- Clade: †Titanosauria
- Clade: †Lithostrotia
- Genus: †Isisaurus; Wilson & Upchurch, 2003
- Species: †I. colberti

Binomial name
- †Isisaurus colberti (Jain & Bandyopadhyay, 1997)

Synonyms
- Titanosaurus colberti Jain & Bandyopadhyay, 1997

= Isisaurus =

Isisaurus Temporal range: Late Cretaceous (Maastrichtian), 70–66 Ma

Extinct genus of dinosaurs

Isisaurus (named after the Indian Statistical Institute) is a genus of titanosaurian dinosaur from the Late Cretaceous Lameta Formation of India and Pab Formation of Pakistan. The genus contains a single species, Isisaurus colberti.

== Discovery and Naming ==
Isisaurus (I. colberti) localities from Lameta Formation, India.
Isisaurus (I. colberti) localities from Pab Formation, Pakistan.

The type specimen of Isisaurus colberti, ISI R 335/1-65, was originally described and named as Titanosaurus colberti by Sohan Lal Jain and Saswati Bandyopadhyay in 1997. The specific name honours Edwin Harris Colbert. In 2003, the fossils were designated as belonging to its own genus by Wilson and Upchurch. The generic name, "Isisaurus," combines a reference to the Indian Statistical Institute (ISI) with the Greek "saurus," meaning "lizard." It had a short, vertically directed neck and long forelimbs, making it considerably different from other sauropods. The humerus is 148 centimetres long.

The site locality is Dongargaon Hill, which is in a Maastrichtian crevasse splay claystone in the Lameta Formation of India. Dongargaon Hill (20.212318N,79.090709E) is located near Warora, in Chandrapur District, Maharashtra.

A braincase referrable to the species is known from the Pab Formation of Pakistan, which is equivalent in age to the Lameta Formation.

Isisaurus is known from better remains than many other titanosaurs that were known at the time of its description. Much of its postcranial skeleton is known. The skeletal material found by Jain and Bandyopadhyay between 1984 and 1986 was "in associated and mostly articulated condition." The holotype includes cervical, dorsal, sacral and caudal vertebrae, ribs, pelvis, scapula, coracoid, left forelimb and other bones. No skull, hindlimb, or foot bones are known. Since the original description of Isisaurus, unrelated titanosaur fossils belonging to more complete individuals have been discovered elsewhere.

== Description ==
Size compared to a human

Isisaurus was a medium-sized sauropod, with some estimates of its body length up to 18 metres (59 ft) long and weighing 15 metric tons (17 short tons). The angle between the occipital bone and occipital condyle in Isisaurus and the fellow Indian titanosaur Jainosaurus is different. In the specimen from Dongargaon it is equal to 120°. In that matter, the cranium of Isisaurus resembles the skulls of Diplodocus and Apatosaurus (genera belonging to the Diplodocidae), but the bone modifications are different.

== Classification ==
While Isisaurus has consistently been considered to be a titanosaurian sauropod, its exact placement within this clade and its relationships with other titanosaurs has been controversial and problematic. Most analyses have recovered it with close affinities to taxa such as Rapetosaurus or the Saltasauridae. Various alternative positions suggested in that past are displayed in the following cladograms:

Isisaurus was placed within Opisthocoelicaudiinae by Curry-Rogers in 2005.

- Opisthocoelicaudiinae
  - Isisaurus
  - - Alamosaurus
    - - Argentinosaurus
      - Antarctosaurus
      - Opisthocoelicaudia

The cladogram below follows Zaher et al. (2011).

- Lithostrotia
  - Malawisaurus
  - - Nemegtosauridae
      - Nemegtosaurus
      - - Rapetosaurus
        - Tapuiasaurus
    - - Isisaurus
      - - Diamantinasaurus
        - Saltasauridae
          - Opisthocoelicaudiinae
            - Alamosaurus
            - Opisthocoelicaudia
          - Saltasaurinae
            - Neuquensaurus
            - Saltasaurus

In 2017, Isisaurus was recovered as the sister taxon to Tapuiasaurus.

- - Baurutitan
  - - - Saltasauridae
      - Alamosaurus
    - - Rapetosaurus
      - - Tapuiasaurus
        - Isisaurus

In 2021, Isisaurus was placed as the sister taxon to Arackar. The cladogram from Rubilar-Rogers et al. (2021) is shown below:

- Lithostrotia
  - Malawisaurus
  - - Baurutitan
    - - - Rapetosaurus
        - - Arackar
          - Isisaurus
      - - Tapuiasaurus
        - - Alamosaurus
          - - Opisthocoelicaudia
            - Saltasaurinae

== Palaeobiology ==
Fungus in coprolites believed to have been voided by Isisaurus indicate that it ate leaves from several species of tree, since these fungi are known to be pathogens which infect tree leaves.

== Paleoecology ==
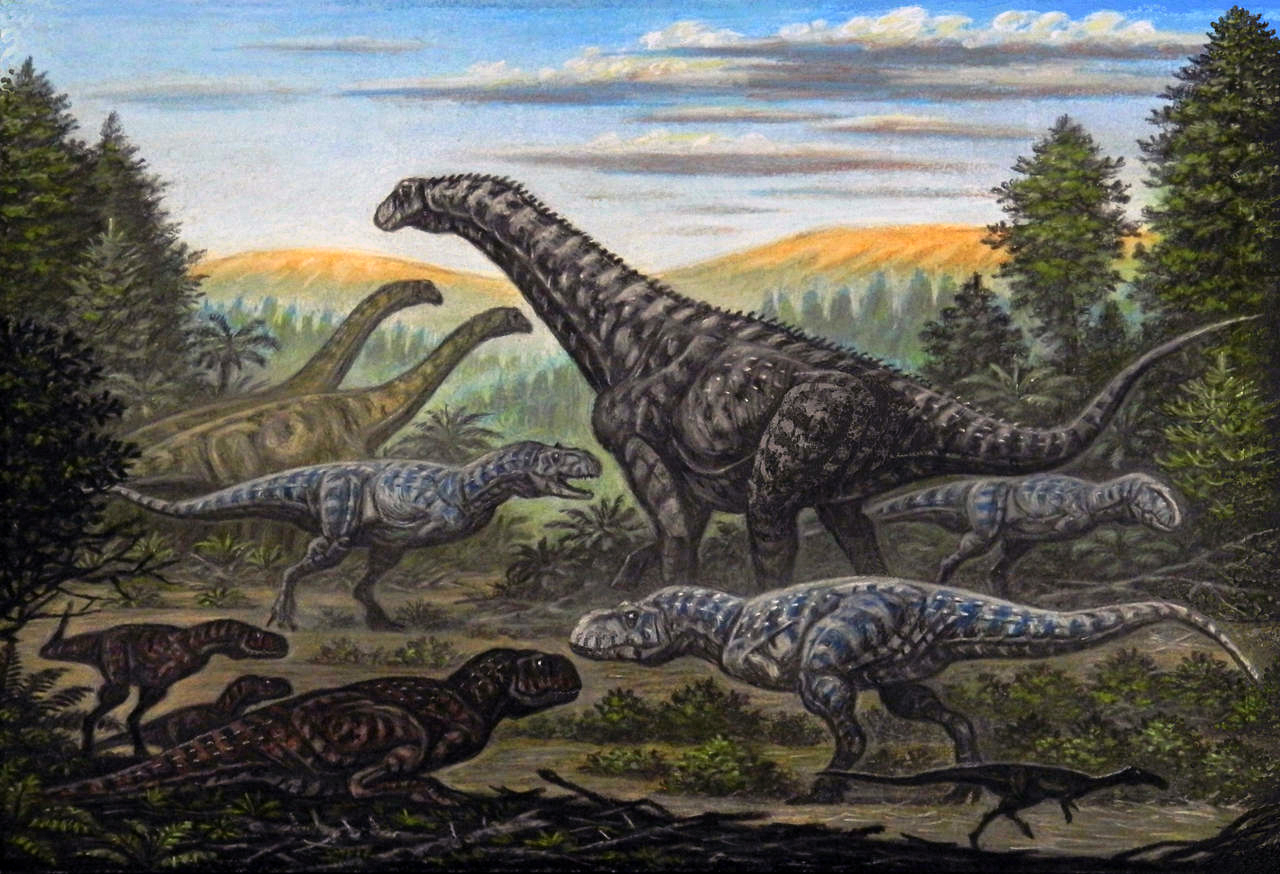
Life restoration of Isisaurus (middle) with contemporary dinosaurs

Isisaurus lived in the area of present day central India and western Pakistan during the Maastrichtian age of the Cretaceous period. Its remains are the most complete among the Cretaceous dinosaurs known from that region. Khosla et al. (2003) listed the following Indian sauropods:

- Titanosaurus indicus
- T. blanfordi
- T. rahiolensis
- Jainosaurus septentrionalis.

Wilson et al. (2009) listed only two Indian titanosaurs, Isisaurus and its distant relative, Jainosaurus. Isisaurus and Jainosaurus lived sympatrically in the area of middle and western India. Isisaurus fossils have also been reported from western Pakistan.

Other dinosaurs, including the abelisaurs Indosuchus, Rahiolisaurus, and Rajasaurus, also existed in the Lameta Formation.
