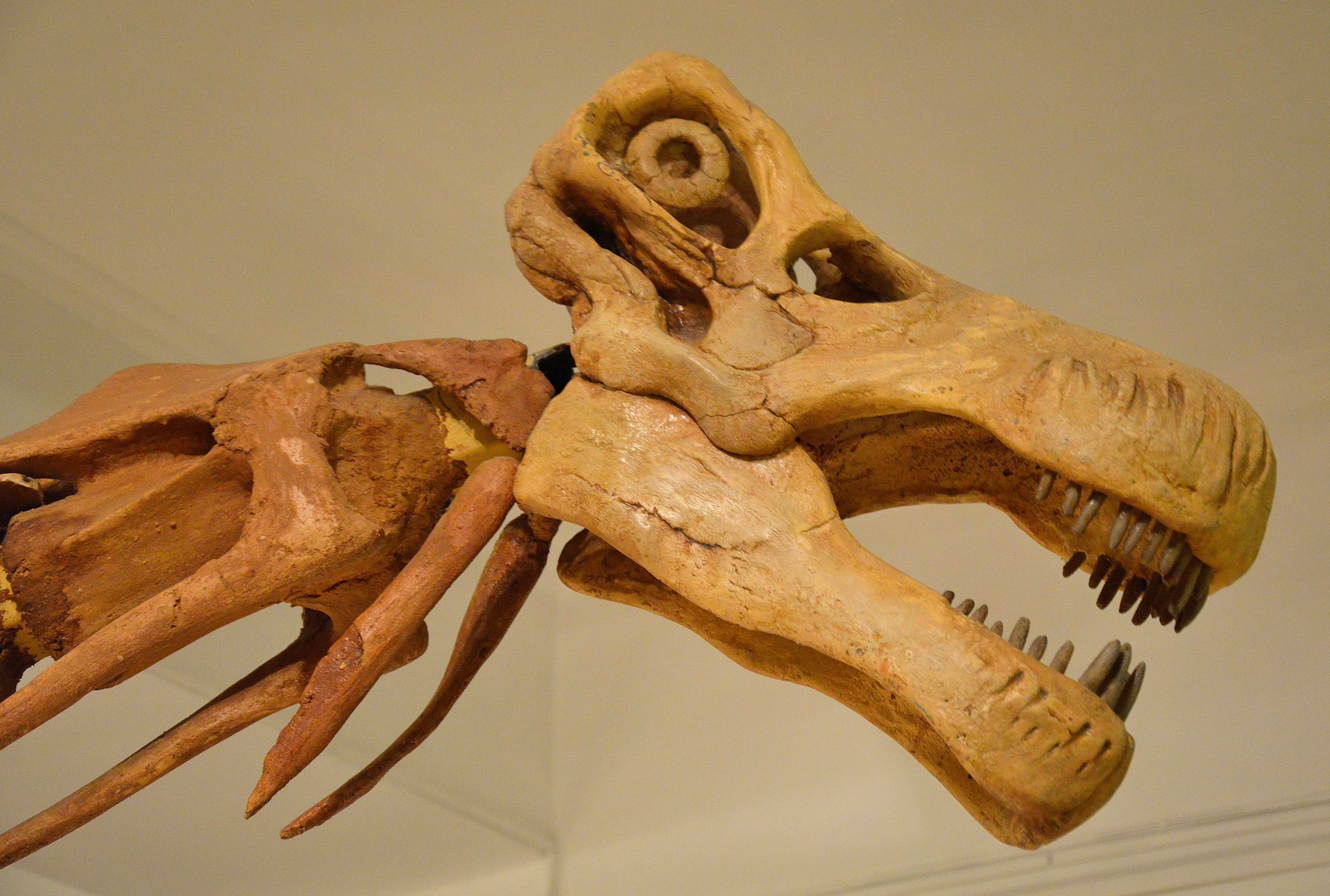
- Cast of the skull of Nemegtosaurus, on a mounted Opisthocoelicaudia skeleton, Museum of Evolution of Polish Academy of Sciences, Warsaw

Scientific classification
- Kingdom: Animalia
- Phylum: Chordata
- Class: Reptilia
- Clade: Dinosauria
- Clade: Saurischia
- Clade: †Sauropodomorpha
- Clade: †Sauropoda
- Clade: †Macronaria
- Clade: †Titanosauria
- Clade: †Eutitanosauria
- Superfamily: †Saltasauroidea
- Family: †Nemegtosauridae; Upchurch, 1995

Genera
- †Nemegtosaurus; †Quaesitosaurus; †Tapuiasaurus?

= Nemegtosauridae =

Nemegtosaurids Temporal range: Late Cretaceous, 75–66 Ma Possible Early Cretaceous record

Extinct family of dinosaurs

Nemegtosauridae is a family of titanosaurian sauropod dinosaurs based on their diplodocid-like skulls. Only three species are known: Nemegtosaurus, Quaesitosaurus and possibly Tapuiasaurus, each from the Cretaceous.

== History of classification ==
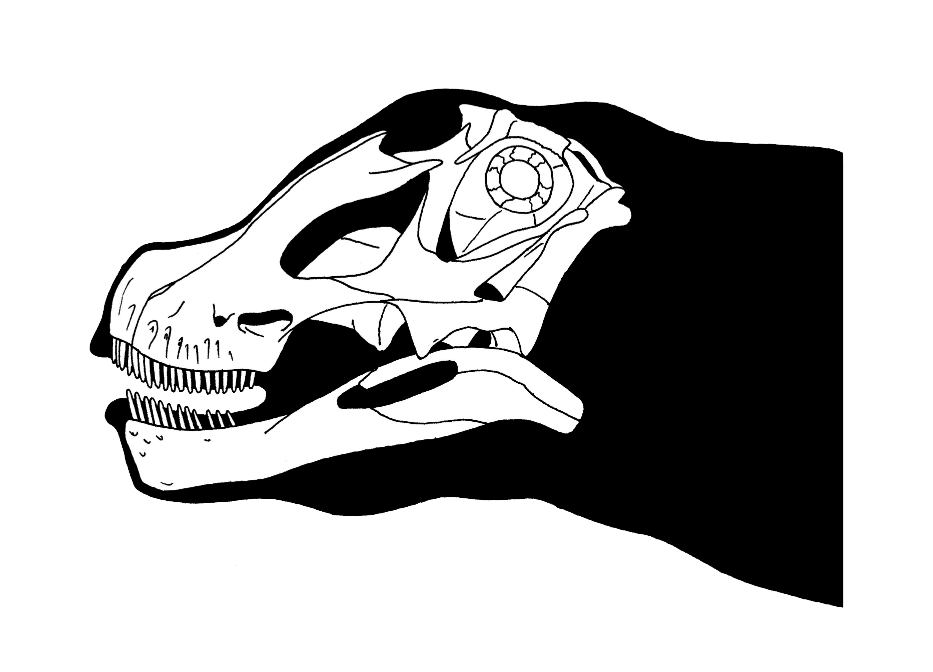
Skull reconstruction of Tapuiasaurus

Due to the diplodocid-like nature of the taxa placed in Nemegtosauridae, the systematic position of this family in Sauropoda was disputed until recently. McIntosh (1990) included both these animals in the family Diplodocidae, subfamily Dicraeosaurinae, as they resemble the skull of Dicraeosaurus, although differing in certain details. Although the skull of Nemegtosaurus was found in the same formation as the headless skeleton of Opisthocoelicaudia, McIntosh (1990) kept Nemegtosaurus in Diplodocoidea while keeping Opisthocoelicaudia separate from the former, a position reiterated by Upchurch (1995, 1999), and Upchurch et al. (2004). A cladistic analysis published in 2002 transferred Nemegtosaurus and Opisthocoelicaudia from Diplodocoidea to Titanosauria.

Apesteguia (2004), in a paper describing a new Patagonian sauropod, Bonitasaura salgadoi, may have been the first to properly define the taxon, although without the use of cladistic analysis: the stemclade consisting of all titanosaurs more closely related to Nemegtosaurus than to Saltasaurus. He argued for a close relationship between Nemegtosaurus, Quaesitosaurus, Rapetosaurus, and Bonitasaura and referred to the previous phylogenetic analysis and use of Nemegtosauridae by Wilson (2002).

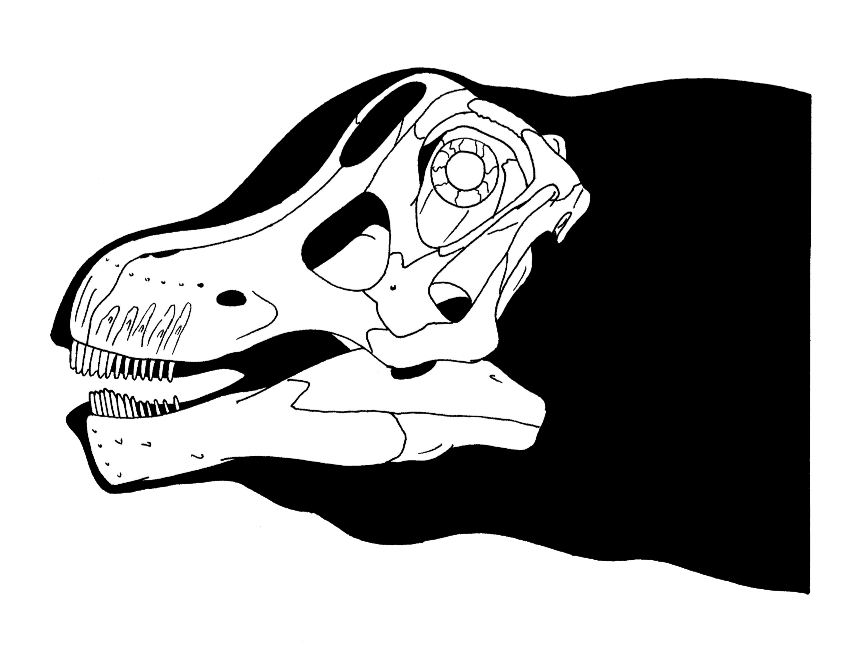
Skull reconstruction of Nemegtosaurus

In his redescription of the Nemegtosaurus holotype, Wilson (2005) elaborated on the titanosaurian nature of Nemegtosaurus, defining Nemegtosauridae as a stem-based clade that includes all titanosaurs more closely related to Nemegtosaurus than to Saltasaurus. He also suggested that Opisthocoelicaudia may eventually be shown to be a junior synonym of Nemegtosaurus. For her part, Kristina Curry Rogers (see also Cuury Rogers and Forster [2001]) agreed with Wilson that both Nemegtosaurus and Quaesitosaurus were titanosaurs rather than diplodocoids, but rejected the validity of Nemegtosauridae and the clade concepts given under that name. Quaesitosaurus was placed in the Saltasaurinae and Nemegtosaurus in a new, unnamed "Rapetosaurus clade" (which, under ICZN rules, would, if named, be termed subfamily Nemegtosaurinae or tribe Nemegtosaurini, depending on its position). Opisthocoelicaudia was placed in a separate clade, the Opisthocoelicaudiinae. All three clades are included in the Saltasauridae (= Titanosauridae).

In a paper discussing new anatomical data on the skull of Tapuiasaurus, Wilson and his colleagues cast doubt on the monophyly of Nemegtosauridae, judging from a rescoring of the Zaher et al. 2011 cladistic analysis regarding cranial characters. Tapuiasaurus was recovered as basal to Lithostrotia, rendering its position within Nemegtosauridae questionable. A 2014 cladistic analysis gleaning new anatomical data from Diamantinasaurus also rendered Nemegtosauridae paraphyletic, with Rapetosaurus falling out as a member of Saltasauridae closer to Isisaurus than to Nemegtosaurus. The cladistic analysis of Patagotitan recovered Tapuiasaurus as the sister taxon of Rapetosaurus and Isisaurus but not Nemegtosaurus.

Nemegtosauridae was retained as a potentially useful clade of titanosaurs by Carballido and colleagues in 2022, who noted that it was either resolved as a small clade of titanosaurs, or an extensive group of taxa closer to Nemegtosaurus than Saltasaurus. Further work on the discovered postcrania was required to resolve the relationships of Nemegtosaurus and Opisthocoelicaudia, but it was preliminarily retained as a clade of saltasauroid that may end up as a synonym of Opisthocoelicaudiinae or even Lirainosaurinae.

== Phylogeny ==
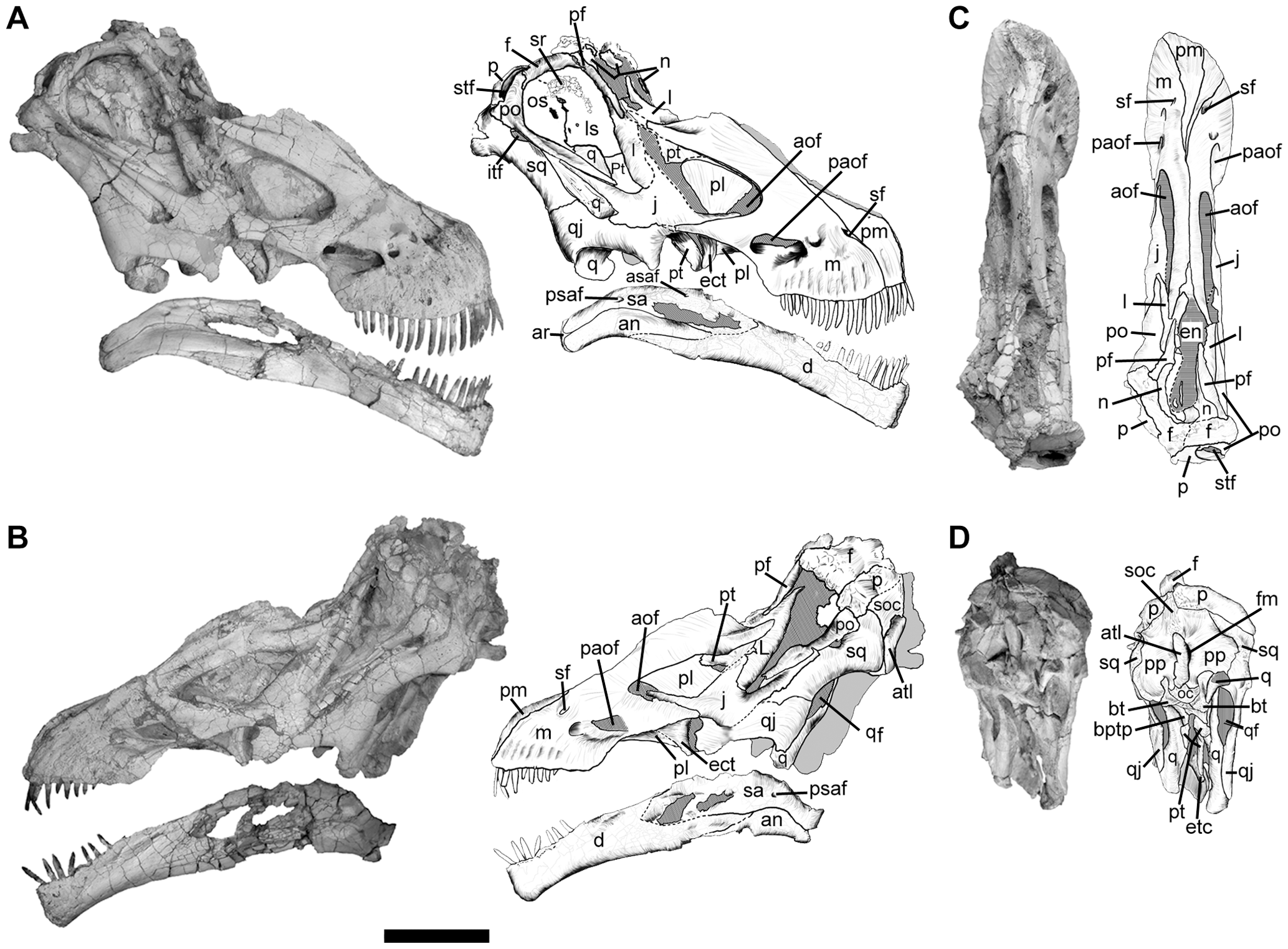
Skull material of Tapuiasaurus

The cladogram below follows Zaher et al. (2011).

- Lithostrotia
  - Malawisaurus
  - - Nemegtosauridae
      - Nemegtosaurus
      - - Rapetosaurus
        - Tapuiasaurus
    - - Isisaurus
      - - Diamantinasaurus
        - Saltasauridae
          - Opisthocoelicaudiinae
            - Alamosaurus
            - Opisthocoelicaudia
          - Saltasaurinae
            - Neuquensaurus
            - Saltasaurus
