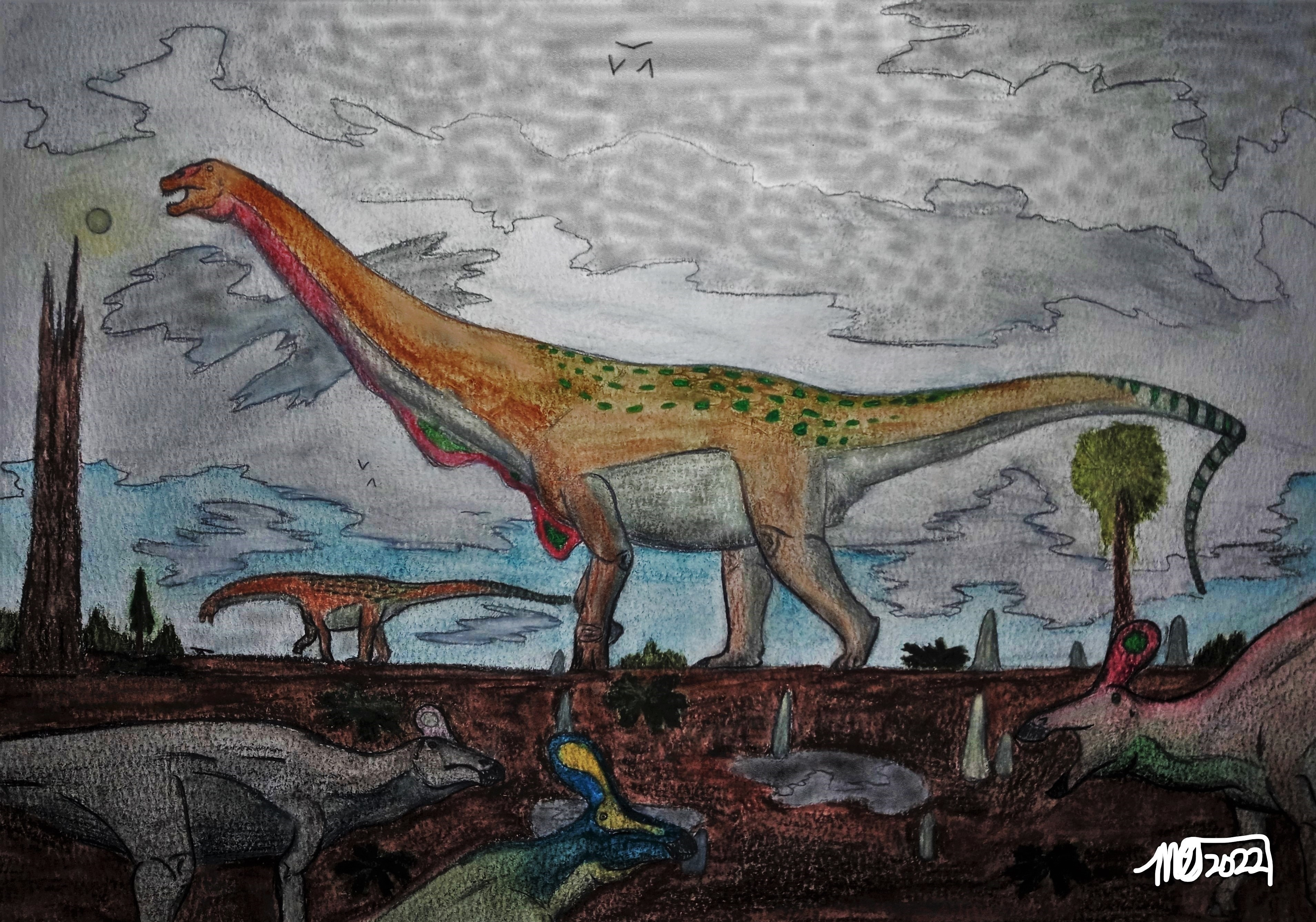
- Speculative life reconstruction

Scientific classification
- Kingdom: Animalia
- Phylum: Chordata
- Class: Reptilia
- Clade: Dinosauria
- Clade: Saurischia
- Clade: †Sauropodomorpha
- Clade: †Sauropoda
- Clade: †Macronaria
- Clade: †Titanosauria
- Family: †Saltasauridae
- Subfamily: †Saltasaurinae
- Genus: †Abditosaurus; Vila et al., 2022
- Species: †A. kuehnei

Binomial name
- †Abditosaurus kuehnei Vila et al., 2022

= Abditosaurus =

Abditosaurus Temporal range: Late Cretaceous (Maastrichtian), 70.5 Ma

Genus of titanosaurian dinosaur

Abditosaurus (meaning "forgotten lizard") is an extinct genus of titanosaurian sauropod dinosaur from the Late Cretaceous (Maastrichtian) Conques Formation (Tremp Group) of Catalonia, Spain. The genus contains a single species, Abditosaurus kuehnei, known from a partial specimen representing the most complete titanosaur skeleton found in Europe. Phylogenetic analyses recover it within a clade of South American and African saltasaurines, distinct from other insular dwarf sauropods from the European archipelago. Abditosaurus inhabited the Ibero-Armorican Island, a prehistoric island made up of what is now Spain, Portugal, and southern France, and would have been the largest titanosaur species in its environment.

== History of study ==
While prospecting for fossil mammals in 1954, German paleontologist Walter Georg Kühne on 25 September discovered the remains of a large titanosaur at the Orcau-1 locality of the Conques Formation of Catalonia, Spain. It was the first major sauropod find in Spain. During the initial two weeks of excavation Kühne managed to identify around ten bones, some of which were packaged and sent to the Instituto Lucas Mallada (ILM) in Madrid, while others remained at the site (jacketed for protection). Returning the following year, Kühne, alongside locals and researchers of the ILM, managed to identify ten more bones in addition to most of those left at the site. Like in 1954, some of the bones were transported to Madrid while the remainder were left at the site. These initial discoveries consisted of fragments of the ilium, parts of the scapula, dorsal vertebrae, chevrons, a tibia, parts of the femurs and a complete humerus alongside undetermined bones. Although Kühne asked for additional excavations, funding had run out and work at the locality was stopped. In 1956, the fossil material recovered was assigned by Albert-Félix de Lapparent and Emiliano Aguirre to a new, but unnamed, species of the now dubious genus Hypselosaurus. It was not until 1984 and 1986 that additional expeditions to the area were conducted, helmed by Josep Vicenç Santafé of the Institut de Paleontologia de Sabadell, Barcelona, and assisted by researchers of the Institut d'Estudis Ilerdencs, Lleida. They identified a sternal plate and additional dorsal vertebrae. Another expedition was conducted from 2012 to 2014 by the Institut Català de Paleontologia, the University of Zaragoza and the Museu de la Conca Dellà. This expedition recovered elements left at the site by the 1955 and 1986 digs, with additional material of the limbs, tooth fragments, ribs and an articulated series of dorsal and cervical vertebrae. Subsequent research managed to discover some of the historical material. In 2017, part of the initial finds were described. This finding was shown in the 2017 documentary "Europe's Last Giant".

The type specimen, which has numerous accession numbers, is the most complete known European titanosaur skeleton, with the semi-articulated neck, preserving twelve of the estimated fourteen cervical vertebrae, being especially noteworthy. Complete and nearly complete sequences of neck vertebrae are very rare in sauropods; as of early 2022, only 27 sauropod specimens with complete or nearly complete necks were known. It was the first semi-articulated titanosaur specimen discovered in Europe.

=== Etymology ===
In 2022, the type species Abditosaurus kuehnei was named and described by Bernat Vila, Albert Sellés, Miguel Moreno-Azanza, Novella L. Razzolini, Alejandro Gil-Delgado, José Ignacio Canudo and Àngel Galobart. The generic name, Abditosaurus, means "forgotten reptile", and is derived from the Latin abditus, meaning "concealed," or "forgotten," as the fossil material was hidden for sixty years between the initial discovery and the last expedition that collected the last bones, and the Greek sauros, meaning "lizard". The specific name, kuehnei, honors Walter Georg Kühne, the discoverer of the type specimen.

== Description ==
Abditosaurus is noted for its large size, and is the largest titanosaur from the Ibero-Armorican Island, a geological region composing most of Spain and Southern France. It is estimated to have reached a length of 17.5 metres (57 ft) and mass of 14 tonnes (15 short tons).

The holotype includes an ossified sternal rib and an ossified calcaneum, elements which hitherto had not been unequivocally identified in titanosaur specimens, leading to speculation that they had fully disappeared in the group. These bones probably ossified due to the advanced individual age of the holotype, which was also proven by its bone structure.

== Classification ==
- - - Lognkosauria
      - - Futalognkosaurus
        - Rukwatitan
      - - Epachthosaurus
        - - Mendozasaurus
          - - Notocolossus
            - Atsinganosaurus
    - Saltasauridae
      - Opisthocoelicaudiinae
        - - Mansourasaurus
          - Paludititan
        - - - Ampelosaurus
            - - Lirainosaurus
              - Opisthocoelicaudia
          - - Lohuecotitan
            - - Pellegrinisaurus
              - - Dreadnoughtus
                - - Baurutitan
                  - Alamosaurus
      - Saltasaurinae
        - Saltasaurini
          - Neuquensaurus
          - Saltasaurus
        - - Maxakalisaurus
          - - Paralititan
            - Abditosaurus

Phylogenetic position of Abditosaurus within Saltasauridae according to Vila et al. 2022. European genera are highlighted in pink, showing that Abditosaurus is not closely related to other European titanosaurs.

- Eutitanosauria
  - Patagotitan
  - - - Maxakalisaurus
      - Paralititan
    - - - - - Baurutitan
            - Dreadnoughtus
          - - Alamosaurus
            - - Abditosaurus
              - Pellegrinisaurus
        - - - - Mendozasaurus
              - Rukwatitan
            - - Argentinosaurus
              - - Futalognkosaurus
                - Notocolossus
      - - Atsinganosaurus
        - - Epachthosaurus
          - Saltasauridae
            - - Saltasaurus
              - Neuquensaurus
            - - - Nemegtosaurus
                - Opisthocoelicaudia
              - - - Mansourasaurus
                  - Paludititan
                - - - Ampelosaurus
                    - Igai
                  - - Lirainosaurus
                    - Lohuecotitan

Phylogenetic position of Abditosaurus within Eutitanosauria, after a 2023 analysis by Gorscak and colleagues, showing the results of their tip-dated Bayesian analysis

The discoverers of Abditosaurus interpreted it as a member of Saltasaurinae, a clade of titanosaurs found in South America and Africa. Their phylogenetic analysis recovered the Egyptian sauropod Paralititan as the sister taxon of Abditosaurus, with the Brazilian Maxakalisaurus as their next-closest relative. The clade uniting these three species, in turn, formed a sister clade to Saltasaurini. As such, Abditosaurus is not closely related to other European sauropods, the majority of which were recovered as opisthocoelicaudiines by their phylogenetic analysis. A subsequent study, using a revised version of the dataset used by Vila and colleagues, found Abditosaurus to occupy a different (non-saltasaurid) position, forming a clade with Alamosaurus, Pellegrinisaurus, Baurutitan, and Dreadnoughtus that was closely related to lognkosaurs.

== Paleoecology ==
The only known specimen of Abditosaurus was found in the Conques Formation, which dates to the early Maastrichtian age of the Cretaceous. At this time, southern France, Spain, and Portugal formed an island, known as the Ibero-Armorican Island. Most titanosaur taxa of the Ibero-Armorican Island, such as Lirainosaurus, Atsinganosaurus, Garrigatitan, Ampelosaurus, and Lohuecotitan, were small or medium-sized. In contrast, Abditosaurus was significantly larger and lacked physiological adaptations to an island environment, suggesting that the species was a recent arrival in the ecosystem. It may be part of a broader trend of larger sauropods replacing smaller endemic species in Europe during the early Maastrichtian, as larger sauropods first appear in the Hațeg biota around the same time. Abditosaurus is associated with eggs of the oospecies Fusioolithus baghensis, which closely resemble eggs found in Gondwana.
