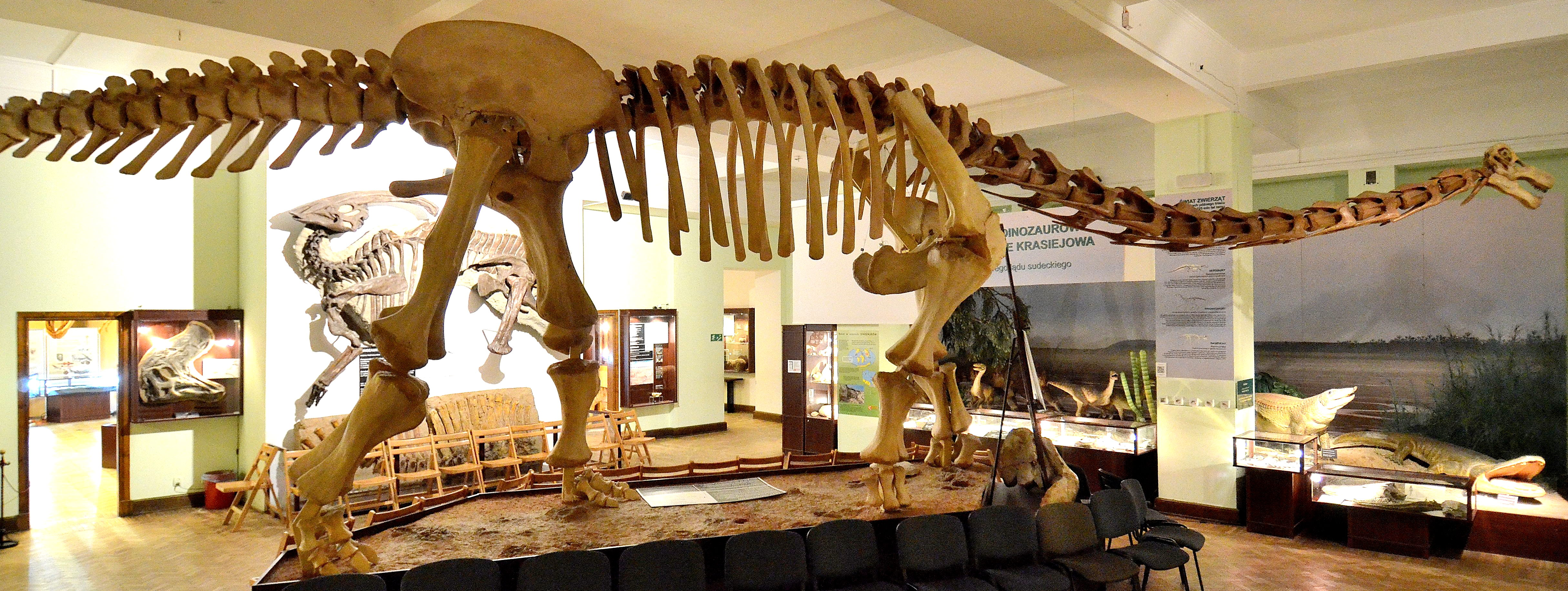
- Opisthocoelicaudia skeleton restoration in Museum of Evolution of Polish Academy of Sciences in Warsaw

Scientific classification
- Kingdom: Animalia
- Phylum: Chordata
- Class: Reptilia
- Clade: Dinosauria
- Clade: Saurischia
- Clade: †Sauropodomorpha
- Clade: †Sauropoda
- Clade: †Macronaria
- Clade: †Titanosauria
- Family: †Saltasauridae
- Subfamily: †Opisthocoelicaudiinae; McIntosh, 1990

Genera
- †Abditosaurus?; †Alamosaurus; †Mansourasaurus?; †Nemegtosaurus?; †Opisthocoelicaudia; †Pellegrinisaurus; †Quaesitosaurus?; †Qunkasaura

Synonyms
- Opisthocoelicaudiidae (McIntosh, 1990) Averianiv & Lopatin, 2022; ?Nemegtosauridae Upchurch, 1995

= Opisthocoelicaudiinae =

Opisthocoelicaudiines Temporal range: Late Cretaceous, Maastrichtian

Extinct clade of dinosaurs

Opisthocoelicaudiinae is a subfamily of titanosaurian dinosaurs from the Late Cretaceous. It was named by John McIntosh in 1990. Opisthocoelicaudiines are known from Mongolia, Argentina, and the United States. Two genera were assigned to Opisthocoelicaudiinae by Gonzalez et al. (2009): Alamosaurus and Opisthocoelicaudia (the type genus), a conclusion also found by Díez Díaz et al. (2018). The hands of opisthocoelicaudiines lacked wrist bones and phalanges.

It was suggested by Averianov and Lopatin in 2022 that Opisthocoelicaudia was not in fact closely related to Saltasaurus, and instead to Nemegtosaurus and Quaesitosaurus, which are both also Laurasian, as well as isolated teeth from the Turonian of Uzbekistan and the Santonian of Kazakhstan. Suggesting a more distant relationship to Saltasaurus, Averianiov and Lopatin suggested using the clade name Opisthocoelicaudiidae for the group, limiting Saltasauridae to Gondwanan taxa.

Opisthocoelicaudiinae in a cladogram after Navarro et al., 2022:

- Saltasauridae
  - Opisthocoelicaudiinae
    - Opisthocoelicaudia
    - Nemegtosaurus
  - Saltasaurinae
    - - Alamosaurus
      - Baurutitan
    - - - Ibirania
        - - Bonatitan
          - Rocasaurus
      - Saltasaurini
        - Neuquensaurus
        - - MACN-PV-RN 233
          - Saltasaurus
