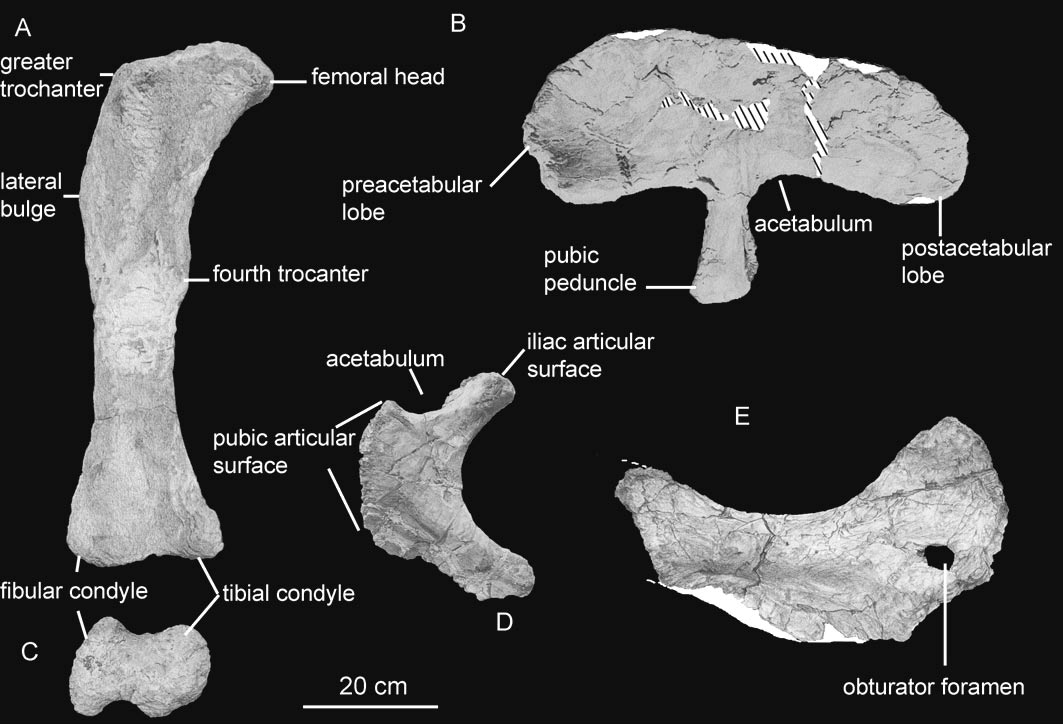
- Femur and pelvis

Scientific classification
- Kingdom: Animalia
- Phylum: Chordata
- Class: Reptilia
- Clade: Dinosauria
- Clade: Saurischia
- Clade: †Sauropodomorpha
- Clade: †Sauropoda
- Clade: †Macronaria
- Clade: †Titanosauria
- Family: †Saltasauridae
- Tribe: †Saltasaurini
- Genus: †Rocasaurus
- Species: †R. muniozi

Binomial name
- †Rocasaurus muniozi Salgado & Azpilicueta, 2000

= Rocasaurus =

Rocasaurus Temporal range: Campanian-Maastrichtian, 75–66 Ma

Genus of titanosaurian sauropod from the Late Cretaceous period

Rocasaurus (meaning "General Roca lizard") is a genus of titanosaurian sauropod that lived in South America. Rocasaurus was discovered in Argentina in 2000, within the Allen Formation which is dated to be middle Campanian to early Maastrichtian in age (75 to 70 million years ago in the Late Cretaceous). This genus grew up to 8 metres (26 ft) long, making it one of the smaller sauropods. It seems to be closely related to saltasaurid dinosaurs, like Saltasaurus and Neuquensaurus. The type species, Rocasaurus muniozi, was formally described by Leonardo Salgado and Azpilicueta in 2000.

== Discovery and naming ==
Between 1989 and 1994, expeditions of the National University of Comahue and the Carlos Ameghino Provincial Museum collected titanosaur fossils from the locality of Salitral Moreno, 25 km south of the city of General Roca in Río Negro Province, Argentina. In 2000, Leonardo Salgado and Claudia Azpilicueta described some of these remains as representing a new genus and species, Rocasaurus muniozi. The genus name refers to its discovery near General Roca and the species name honors Juan Carlos Muñoz, director of paleontology at the Carlos Ameghino Provincial Museum, for his support of paleontological research in the region.

== Fossil record ==
Fossils of Rocasaurus muniozi are known from the Allen Formation of central Argentina. They have been found at two sites: Salitral Moreno, the type locality, and Salitral Ojo del Agua. Strata exposed at Salitral Moreno and Salitral Ojo del Agua were attributed to the lower member of the Allen Formation by Powell in 1992, but reinterpreted as belonging to the middle member by Salgado and colleagues in 2007. The Allen Formation is considered to date to the Campanian and Maastrichtian ages of the Late Cretaceous. The age of the middle member has been disputed; it has been considered to date to the Late Campanian, but in 2024 Pincheira and Garrido considered it to date to the Late Maastrichtian. The holotype of Rocasaurus muniozi, MPCA-Pv 46, is a partial skeleton of a juvenile individual including partial cervical vertebrae, partial dorsal vertebrae, caudal vertebrae, both ilia, ischia, and pubes, and the left femur. Other elements of R. muniozi found at Salitral Moreno include three cervical vertebrae and several caudal vertebrae. Additional remains of R. muniozi are known Salitral Ojo del Agua, and include partial cervical vertebrae, a partial dorsal vertebra, and a fragmentary ischium.

== Description ==
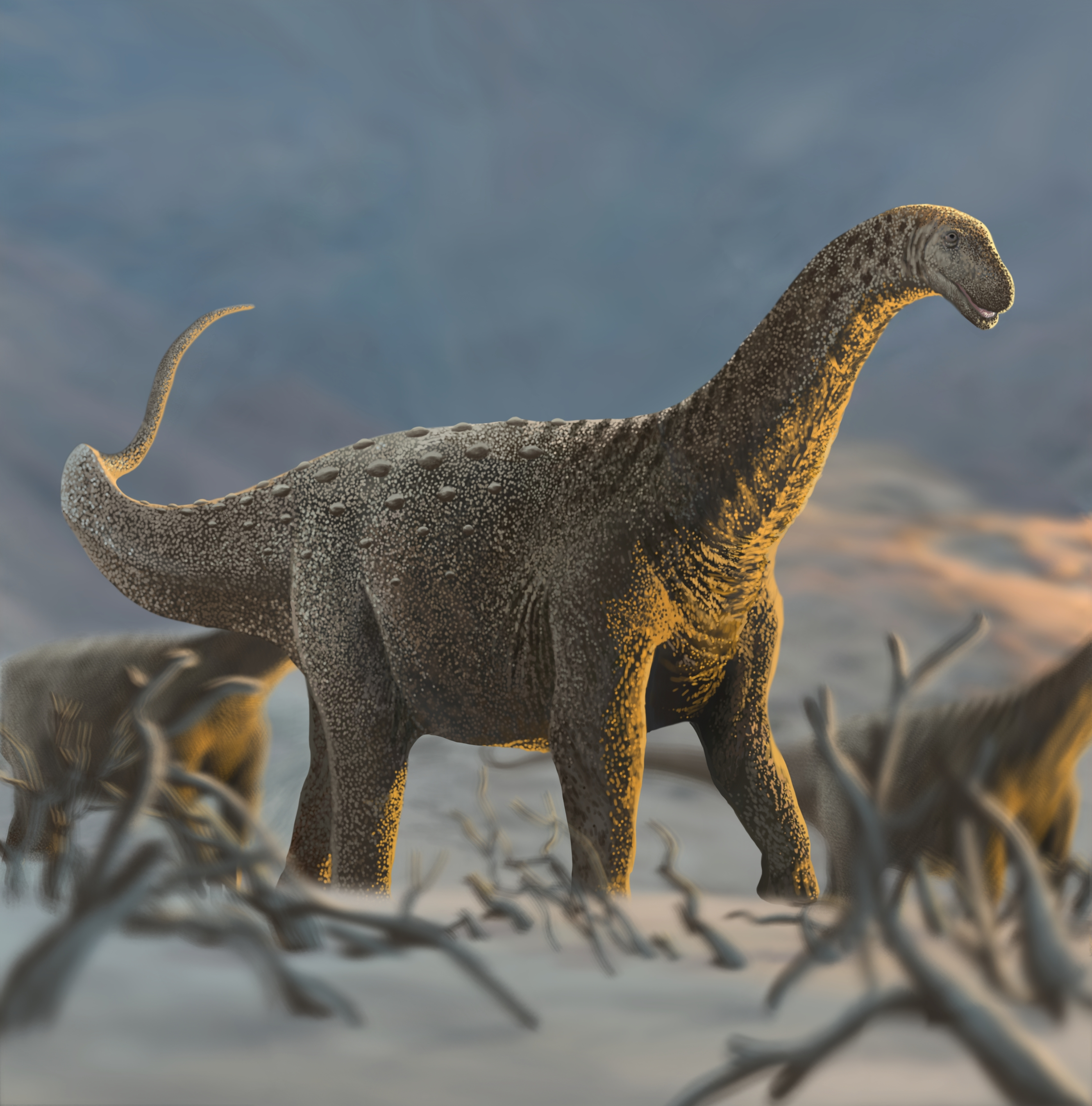
Speculative life reconstruction

Rocasaurus is considered a small sauropod. As in the closely-related saltasaurines Neuquensaurus and Saltasaurus, the skeleton of Rocasaurus is highly pneumatic.

== Phylogeny ==
Rocasaurus in a cladogram after Navarro et al., 2022:

- Saltasauridae
  - Opisthocoelicaudiinae
    - Opisthocoelicaudia
    - Nemegtosaurus
  - Saltasaurinae
    - - Alamosaurus
      - Baurutitan
    - - - Ibirania
        - - Bonatitan
          - Rocasaurus
      - Saltasaurini
        - Neuquensaurus
        - - MACN-PV-RN 233
          - Saltasaurus
