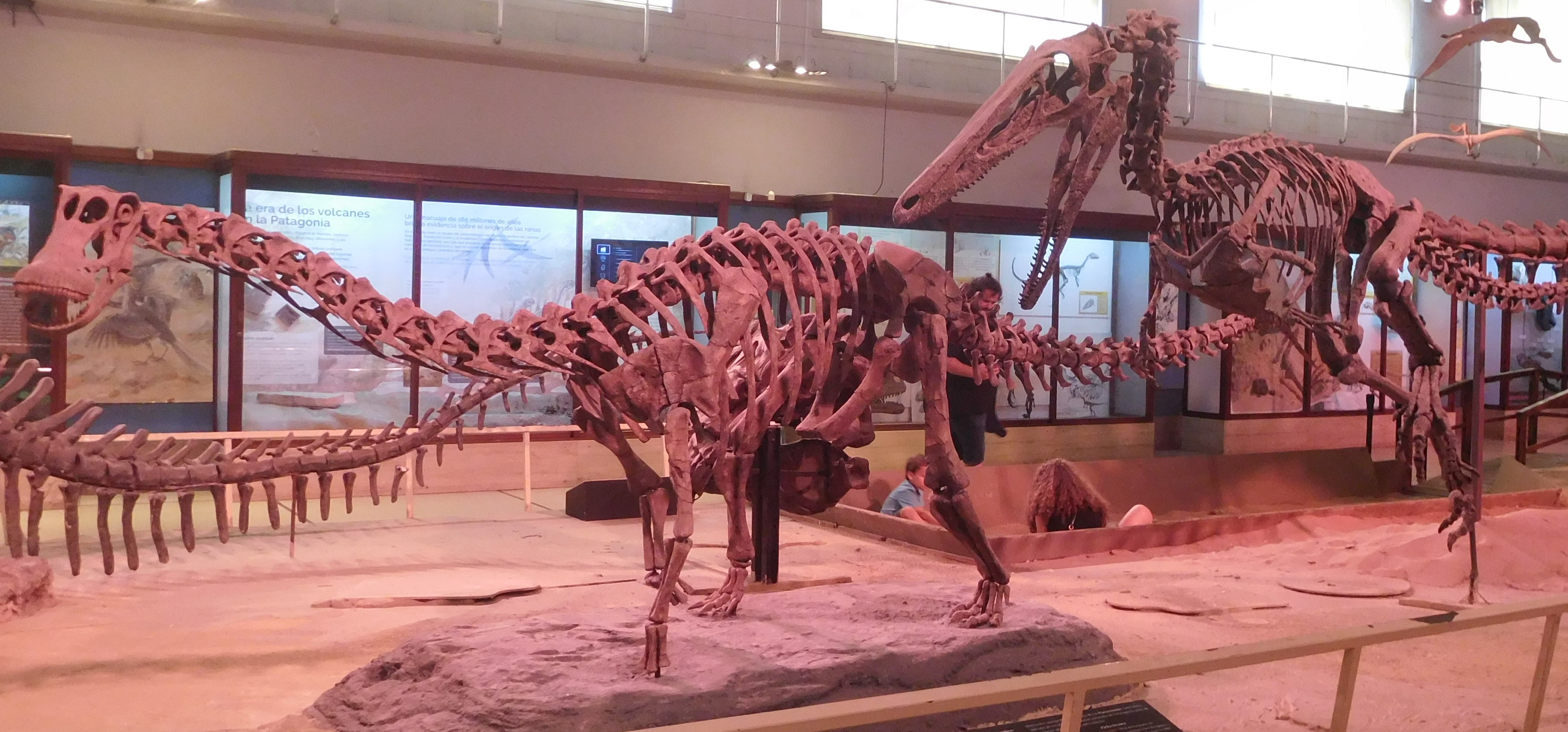
- Mounted skeletons of Bonatitan and Austroraptor

Scientific classification
- Kingdom: Animalia
- Phylum: Chordata
- Class: Reptilia
- Clade: Dinosauria
- Clade: Saurischia
- Clade: †Sauropodomorpha
- Clade: †Sauropoda
- Clade: †Macronaria
- Clade: †Titanosauria
- Family: †Saltasauridae
- Subfamily: †Saltasaurinae
- Genus: †Bonatitan
- Species: †B. reigi

Binomial name
- †Bonatitan reigi Martinelli & Forasiepi, 2004

= Bonatitan =

Bonatitan Temporal range: Late Campanian-Early Maastrichtian ~75–70 Ma

Extinct genus of dinosaurs

Bonatitan is a genus of titanosaurian dinosaur from the Late Cretaceous Allen Formation of Argentina. It was named in 2004.

== Description ==
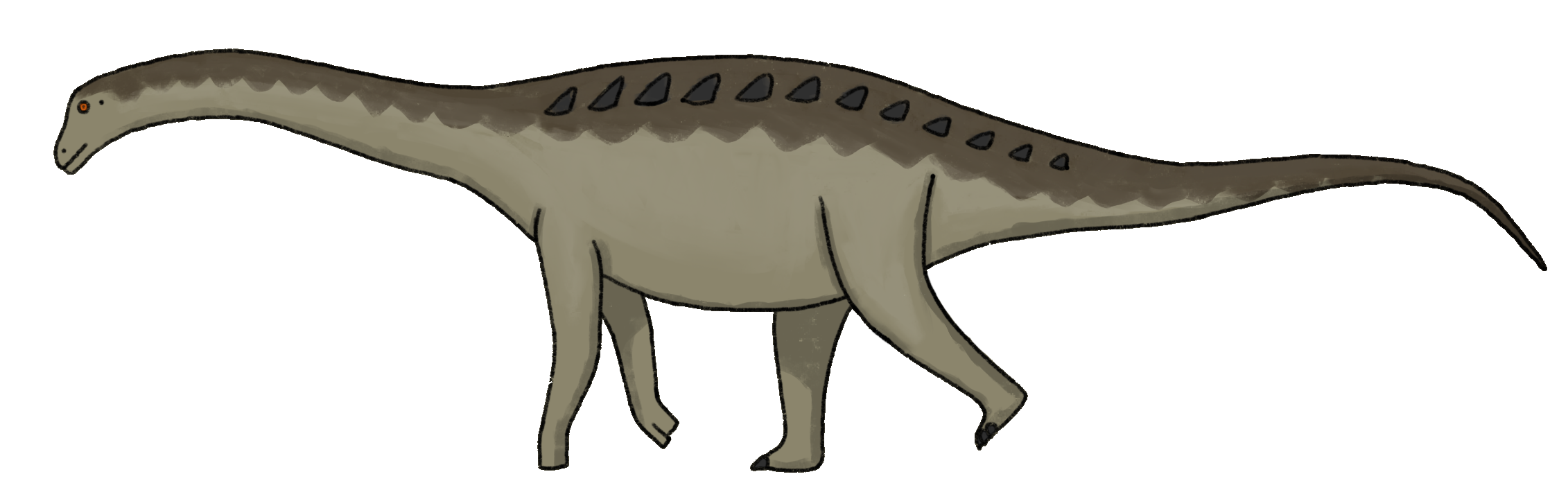
Life restoration

The type species is Bonatitan reigi, first described by Martinelli and Forasiepi in 2004. The specific epithet honours Osvaldo Reig. The holotype, MACN-PV RN 821, originally included a braincase and caudal vertebrae as well as limb elements. However, Salgado et al. (2014) emended the holotype to include the braincase only, and treated other elements catalogued under MACN-PV RN 821 as belonging to separate individual based on size and relative proportions. The genus and species names honor the famous Argentine paleontologists José Fernando Bonaparte and Osvaldo Reig.

== Phylogeny ==
Bonatitan in a cladogram after Navarro et al., 2022:

- Saltasauridae
  - Opisthocoelicaudiinae
    - Opisthocoelicaudia
    - Nemegtosaurus
  - Saltasaurinae
    - - Alamosaurus
      - Baurutitan
    - - - Ibirania
        - - Bonatitan
          - Rocasaurus
      - Saltasaurini
        - Neuquensaurus
        - - MACN-PV-RN 233
          - Saltasaurus
