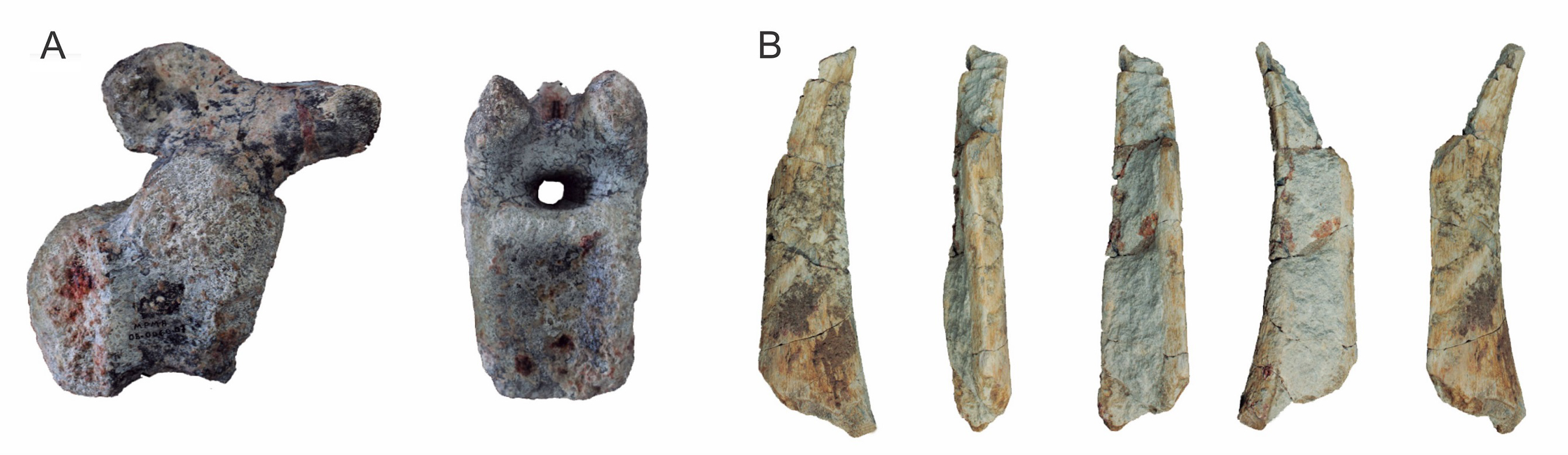
- Caudal vertebra (left) and ulna (right) of Ibirania

Scientific classification
- Kingdom: Animalia
- Phylum: Chordata
- Class: Reptilia
- Clade: Dinosauria
- Clade: Saurischia
- Clade: †Sauropodomorpha
- Clade: †Sauropoda
- Clade: †Macronaria
- Clade: †Titanosauria
- Family: †Saltasauridae
- Subfamily: †Saltasaurinae
- Genus: †Ibirania; Navarro et al., 2022

Type species
- †Ibirania parva Navarro et al., 2022

= Ibirania =

Ibirania Temporal range: Late Cretaceous (Santonian–Campanian)

Extinct genus of titanosaurian dinosaurs

Ibirania (meaning "Ibirá wanderer" or "tree wanderer") is a genus of dwarf saltasaurine titanosaur dinosaur from the Late Cretaceous (Santonian to Campanian) São José do Rio Preto Formation (Bauru Basin) of Southeast Brazil. The type species is Ibirania parva. It is one of the smallest sauropods known to date, comparable in size to the titanosaur Magyarosaurus.

== Discovery and naming ==
The Ibirania holotype specimen, LPP-PV-0200–0207, was discovered in layers of the São José do Rio Preto Formation on the Garcia Brothers Farm in Vila Ventura, Ibirá Municipality, northeastern São Paulo State, Brazil, which dates to the late Santonian to early Campanian ages of the late Cretaceous period. The holotype consists of a dorsal vertebra, partial caudal vertebrae, a fragmentary radius and ulna, a partial metacarpal, and a nearly complete metatarsal. Additional material, including partial cervical, dorsal, and caudal vertebrae, fragments of a fibula, and a nearly complete fibula, was also referred to Ibirania.

In 2022, Navarro et al. described Ibirania as a new genus and species of saltasaurine titanosaur. The generic name, "Ibirania", combines a reference to Ibirá, the municipality where the specimens were discovered (also a Portuguese derivative of the Tupi word "ybyrá", meaning "tree", in reference to Ibirania's hypothesized browsing behavior), with "ania", a modified form of the Greek word "plania", meaning "wanderer". The specific name, "parva", is derived from the Latin word "parvus", meaning "small", after nanism seen in the taxon. The intended name meaning is "little Ibirá wanderer" or "little tree wanderer".

== Description ==
Size of Ibirania compared to a human

Ibirania is estimated to be only 5.7 metres (19 ft) long, making it one of the smallest sauropods.

Using computed tomography, Aureliano et al. (2021) discovered highly pneumatized vertebrae in the Ibirania holotype. Despite the nanoid status of Ibirania, the extreme pneumatization of its axial skeleton was inherited from its giant titanosaurian relatives. The histological thin sections of the vertebral bone revealed the preservation of pneumosteum throughout the internal trabeculae, definitive evidence of the preterit interaction of a bird-like air sac system in the bone.

=== Pathology and parasitology ===
One of the specimens of Ibirania (LPP-PV-0043, a partial fibula) presented a pathology called acute osteomyelitis. Aureliano et al. (2021) sampled histological thin sections of the lesion and described the step-by-step development of periosteal remodeling caused by the infection. They also used CT scan slices and a reconstructed 3D model to describe the trauma.

Aureliano et al. (2021) also discovered fossilized parasites associated with the bone lesions in Ibirania (LPP-PV-0043). It was the first report of parasites preserved in situ inside the vascular canals of a dinosaur. The taxonomy of these microfossils are currently under study by the rest of the team.

== Classification ==
Ibirania was a derived member of the Saltasaurinae, a clade known for encompassing some of the smallest titanosaurs. Ibirania was recovered as sister taxa of the clade formed by the Patagonian saltasaurines Bonatitan and Rocasaurus.

The cladogram below displays the results of the phylogenetic analyses performed by Navarro et al. (2022):

- - Saltasauridae
    - Opisthocoelicaudiinae
    - Saltasaurinae
      - - Alamosaurus
        - Baurutitan
      - - - Ibirania
          - - Bonatitan
            - Rocasaurus
        - Saltasaurini
          - Neuquensaurus
          - - - MACN-PV-RN 233
              - Saltasaurus

== Paleoenvironment ==
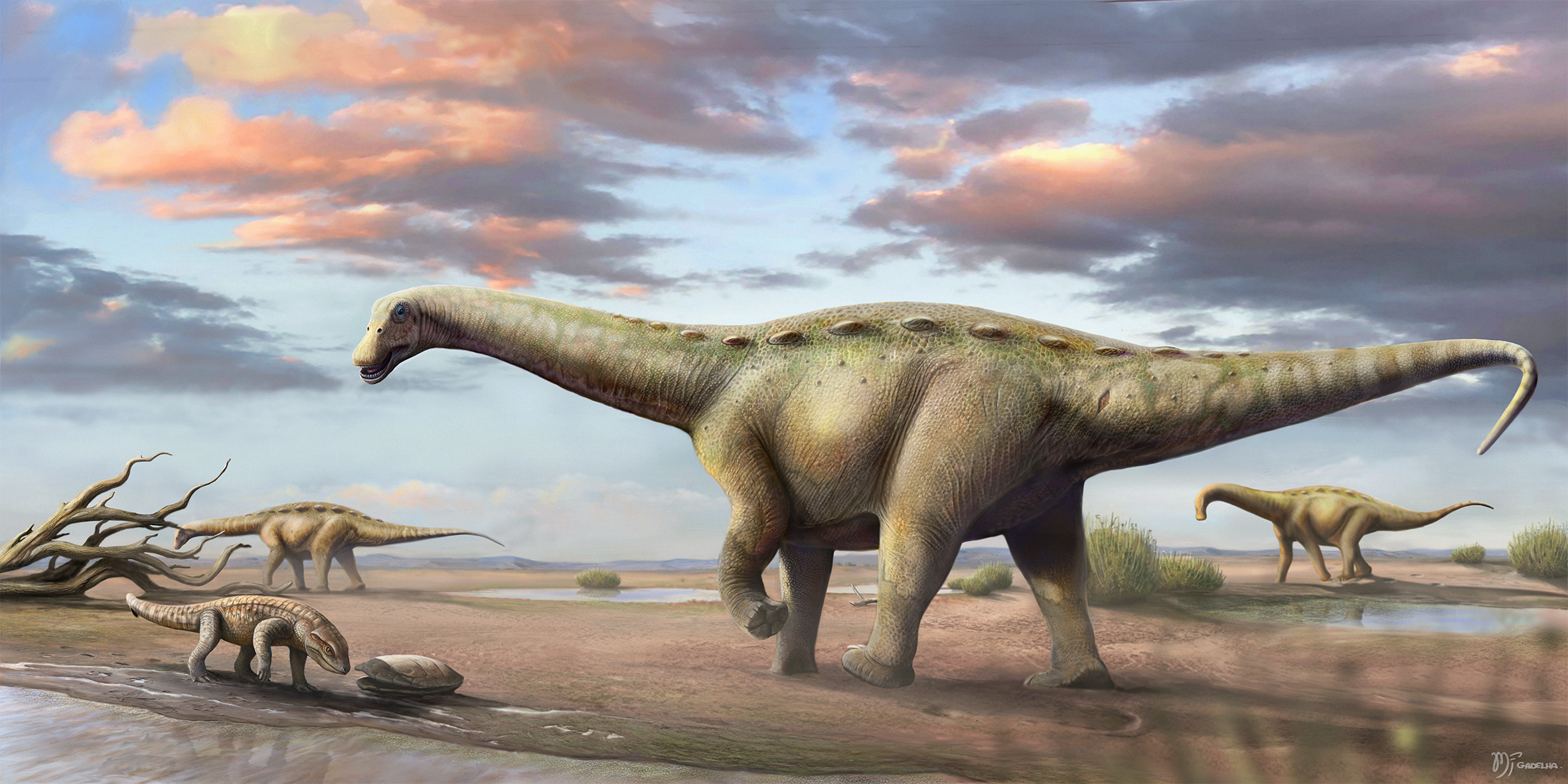
Life restoration of Ibirania

Ibirania lived in an arid, inland environment, which Navarro et al. (2022) presume is the reason behind its dwarfism. This is in contrast to other dwarf sauropods such as Europasaurus and Magyarosaurus, which attained their small size due to insular dwarfism.

It coexisted alongside other dinosaurs, such as the abelisaurid theropod Thanos simonattoi and a larger, unnamed probable megaraptoran, as well as an indeterminate notosuchian.
