= Qingxiusaurus =

Qingxiusaurus Temporal range: Late Cretaceous, 72.1–66 Ma

Scientific classification
- Kingdom: Animalia
- Phylum: Chordata
- Class: Reptilia
- Clade: Dinosauria
- Clade: Saurischia
- Clade: †Sauropodomorpha
- Clade: †Sauropoda
- Clade: †Macronaria
- Clade: †Titanosauria
- Family: †Saltasauridae
- Genus: †Qingxiusaurus; Mo et al., 2008

Type species
- †Qingxiusaurus youjiangensis Mo et al., 2008

Extinct genus of reptiles

Qingxiusaurus (meaning "Qingxiu lizard"; "Qingxiu" is short for Pinyin "shangqingshuixiu", which means "a picturesque scenery of mountains and water in Guangxi") is a genus of titanosaur sauropod dinosaur from the Late Cretaceous Dashi Site of Guangxi, China. The type species, described by Mo et al. in 2008, is Q. youjiangensis. Like other sauropods, Qingxiusaurus would have been a large quadrupedal herbivore. It is known from only limited remains collected in 1991: Two humeri, two sternal plates, and the neural spine of a single vertebra.
