= Postcranium =

Parts of an animal skeleton other than the skull

The postcranium ("behind the cranium"; plural: postcrania) or postcranial skeleton in zoology and vertebrate paleontology is the skeleton apart from the skull. The postcranium encompasses the axial skeleton, which includes the entirety of the vertebrae and ribs, and the appendicular skeleton, which includes girdles and limbs.

In paleontology, there may be disagreement over whether the skull and skeleton belong to the same or different animals. One example is the case of the dinosaur Nemegtosaurus, which is known only from a skull that was found in the same geological formation as the related Opisthocoelicaudia, which is only known from postcranial material.
