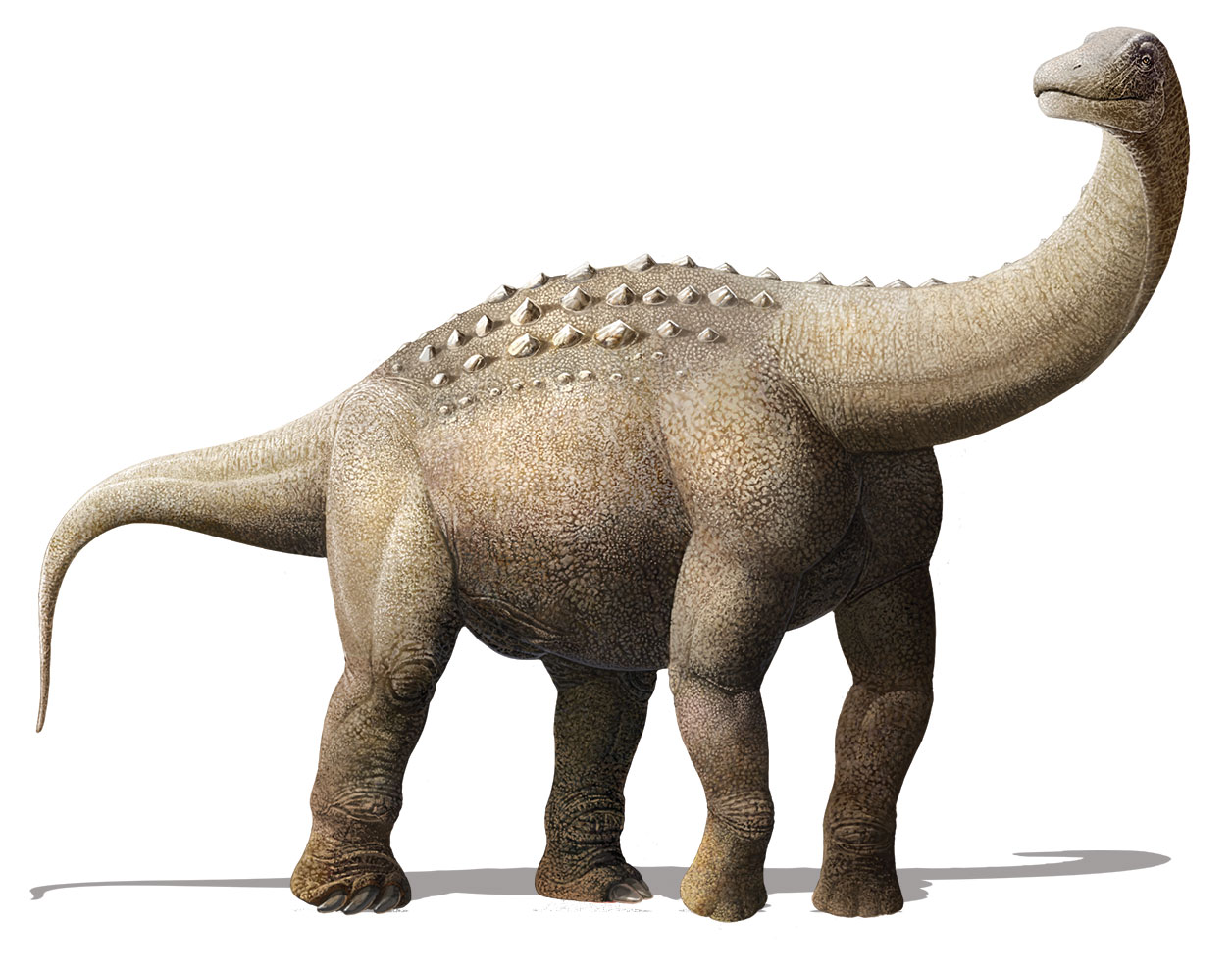
- Artistic depiction of Yamanasaurus

Scientific classification
- Kingdom: Animalia
- Phylum: Chordata
- Class: Reptilia
- Clade: Dinosauria
- Clade: Saurischia
- Clade: †Sauropodomorpha
- Clade: †Sauropoda
- Clade: †Macronaria
- Clade: †Titanosauria
- Family: †Saltasauridae
- Subfamily: †Saltasaurinae
- Genus: †Yamanasaurus; Apesteguía et al., 2020

Type species
- †Yamanasaurus lojaensis Apesteguía et al., 2020

= Yamanasaurus =

Yamanasaurus Temporal range: Campanian-Maastrichtian 75–70 Ma

Extinct genus of dinosaurs

Yamanasaurus (meaning "Yamana lizard") is an extinct genus of saltasaurine titanosaurian dinosaur from the Río Playas Formation of Ecuador, which dates to the Campanian-Maastrichtian of the late Cretaceous period (approximately 75-70 million years ago). The type and only species is Yamanasaurus lojaensis, representing the first non-avian dinosaur described from Ecuador. The holotype, consisting of fragments of a humerus, ulna, tibia, two sacral vertebrae and a single caudal, was discovered in 2017.

== Etymology ==
The genus Yamanasaurus refers to the locality of Yamana, where the bones were found, which is located in southern Ecuador, about fifty kilometers from the Peruvian border.

The specific name, lojaensis, composed of loja and the Latin suffix -ensis, meaning "which lives in, which inhabits", was given in reference to the town of Loja, where the discovery was presented and where part of its study was carried out.

== Description ==
As a saltasaurine sauropod, Yamanasaurus is distinguished by a stocky, quadrupedal body, an elongated neck and tail, and a small head, although its neck and overall size are smaller than the average sauropod, as it is estimated to have been around 6 m (20 ft) long. Like other saltasaurines, it also likely had a protective armour made of osteoderms.

The morphology, size, and age of the specimen suggest that Yamanasaurus is closely related to Neuquensaurus, which was discovered in Argentina. It probably fed on low vegetation.

Yamanasaurus is further characterised by its anterior to mid-tail vertebrae having a dorsoventrally compressed condyle, with the posterior end raised above the midline, without a longitudinal ventral ridge. The internal structure is spongy and lacks internal cavities. The last centrum of the sacral vertebra is as long as it is high, with a small shallow ovoid cavity on the lateral side. The radius is robust with a flattened diaphysis and a marked constriction just below the epiphysis, which has a concave, heptagonal proximal surface.

== Discovery ==
The discovery was made in 2017 by Francisco Celi, an octogenarian resident of Yamana, who, after finding a vertebra of the animal informed university professor Galo Guamán and his geology students, who were on a field trip in the area.

On the subject of its dating, Galo Guamán, who ended up in charge of the study, explains: “The age of the fossils was determined by geological correlation, thanks to rock samples that correspond to the Maastrichtian period, the last period of the Cretaceous, before the impact of the asteroid that caused the extinction of the dinosaurs.”
