= Pab Formation =

Geologic formation in Pakistan

- Stratigraphic range: Maastrichtian; ~66 Ma
- Type: Geological formation
- Underlies: Ranikot Group
- Overlies: Monajhal Group
- Thickness: 150–250 m (490–820 ft)

Lithology
- Primary: Sandstone
- Other: Mudstone, shale

Location
- Region: Balochistan
- Country: Pakistan
- Extent: Sulaiman Basin

The Pab Formation is a Late Cretaceous geologic formation in Balochistan, in western Pakistan. It is dominated by sandstone, with minor mudstone and shale components. Dinosaur remains are among the fossils that have been recovered from the formation.

== Fossil content ==
Among the following fossils were reported from the formation:

Color key: Taxon / Reclassified taxon / Taxon falsely reported as present / Dubious taxon or junior synonym / Ichnotaxon / Ootaxon / Morphotaxon	Notes; Uncertain or tentative taxa are in small text; ~~crossed out~~ taxa are discredited.

=== Dinosaurs ===
==== Saurischians ====
===== Sauropods =====
Sauropods of the Pab Formation
Genus	Species	Location	Stratigraphic position	Material	Notes	Images
Isisaurus	I. colberti	Balochistan, Pakistan	Maastrichtian	Braincase & possible Ulna.	A lithostrotian titanosaur	
Jainosaurus	J. septentrionalis	Balochistan, Pakistan	Maastrichtian	Humerus & Femur.	A colossosaurian titanosaur	

=== Crocodylomorphs ===
Crocodylomorphs of the Pab Formation
Genus	Species	Location	Stratigraphic position	Material	Notes	Images
Pabwehshi	P. pakistanensis	Balochistan, Pakistan	Maastrichtian	Skull elements.	A baurusuchine baurusuchid	

=== Invalid taxa ===
- "Balochisaurus"
- "Gspsaurus"
- "Induszalim"
- "Khetranisaurus"
- "Khuzdarcroco"
- "Marisaurus"
- "Pakisaurus"
- "Saraikisaurus"
- "Sulaimanisaurus"
- "Sulaimanisuchus"
- "Vitakridrinda"
- "Vitakrisaurus"

== See also ==
- List of dinosaur-bearing rock formations
  - List of stratigraphic units with indeterminate dinosaur fossils
