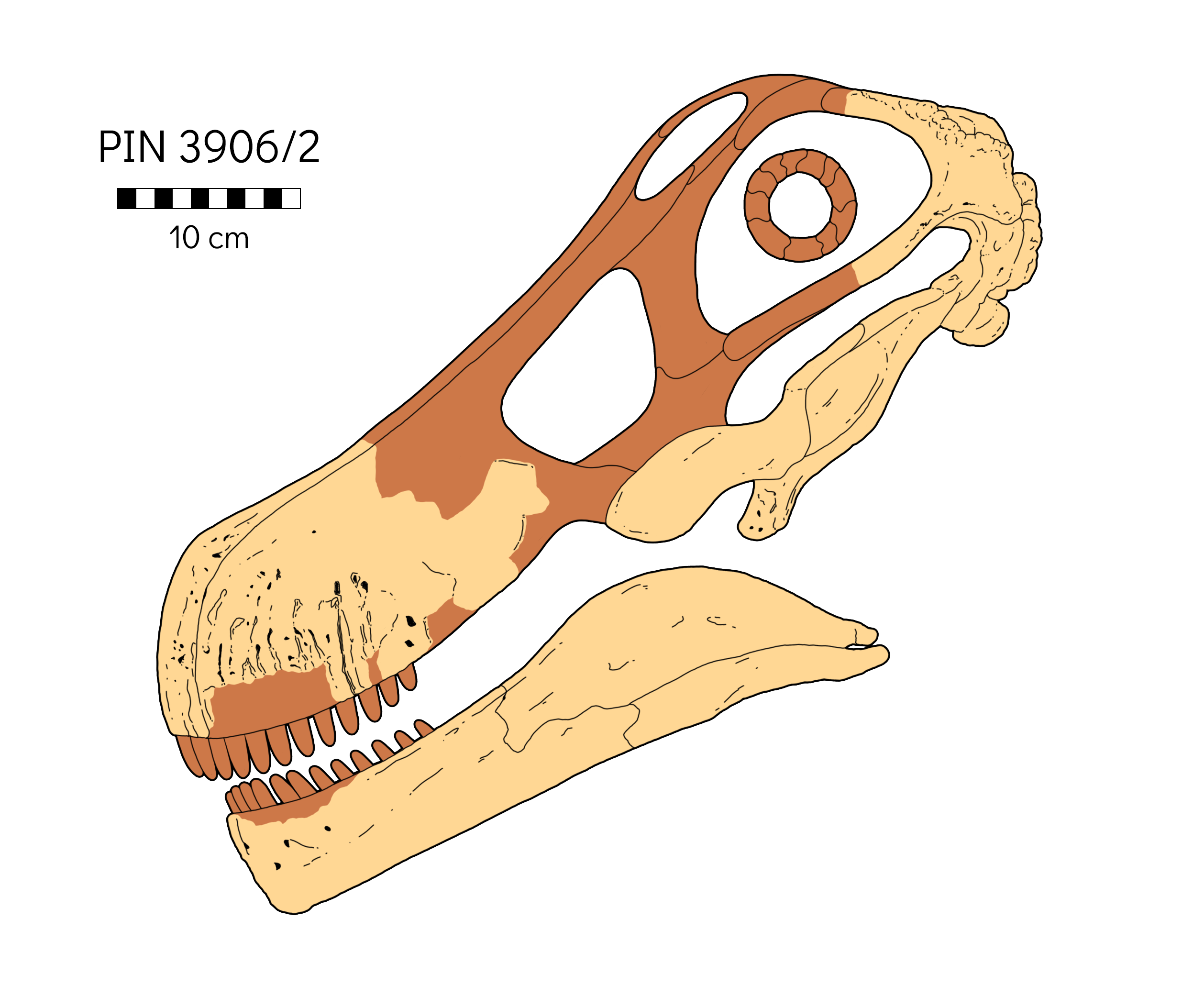
- Diagram showing known elements of the holotype skull

Scientific classification
- Kingdom: Animalia
- Phylum: Chordata
- Class: Reptilia
- Clade: Dinosauria
- Clade: Saurischia
- Clade: †Sauropodomorpha
- Clade: †Sauropoda
- Clade: †Eusauropoda
- Clade: †Macronaria
- Clade: †Titanosauria
- Family: †Nemegtosauridae
- Genus: †Quaesitosaurus; Kurzanov & Bannikov, 1983
- Species: †Q. orientalis

Binomial name
- †Quaesitosaurus orientalis Kurzanov & Bannikov, 1983

= Quaesitosaurus =

Quaesitosaurus Temporal range: Late Cretaceous, 72–66 Ma

Extinct genus of reptiles

Quaesitosaurus (meaning "extraordinary lizard") is a genus of nemegtosaurid sauropod containing only the type species, Q. orientalis, described in 1983. It lived from 72 to 71 million years ago during the Late Cretaceous epoch in the Barun Goyot Formation. With long, low and horse-like with frontally located peg-teeth, the skull of Quaesitosaurus is similar enough to the skull of Diplodocus and its kin to have prompted informed speculation that the missing body was built like those of diplodocids.

== Discovery and naming ==
During the Combined Soviet-Mongolian Paleontological Expeditions in 1971, an isolated, incomplete sauropod skull and nearly complete mandible were unearthed at a fossil site in the Upper Cretaceous bluffs of the Barun Goyot Formation near Shar Tsav, Mongolia. The fossils were later transported to the Paleontological Institute of the Russian Academy of Sciences (then the USSR Academy of Sciences) where they were catalogued as PIN 3906/2. The specimen wasn't described until 1983, when S. M. Kurzanov and A. F. Bannikov named it Quaesitosaurus orientalis, the genus name meaning "abnormal lizard" after the abnormal skull anatomy and the species name meaning "eastern", referring to the fossil's origin in Mongolia. It is possible that Nemegtosaurus, also known from only skull material, is a very close relative of Quaesitosaurus.

== Description ==
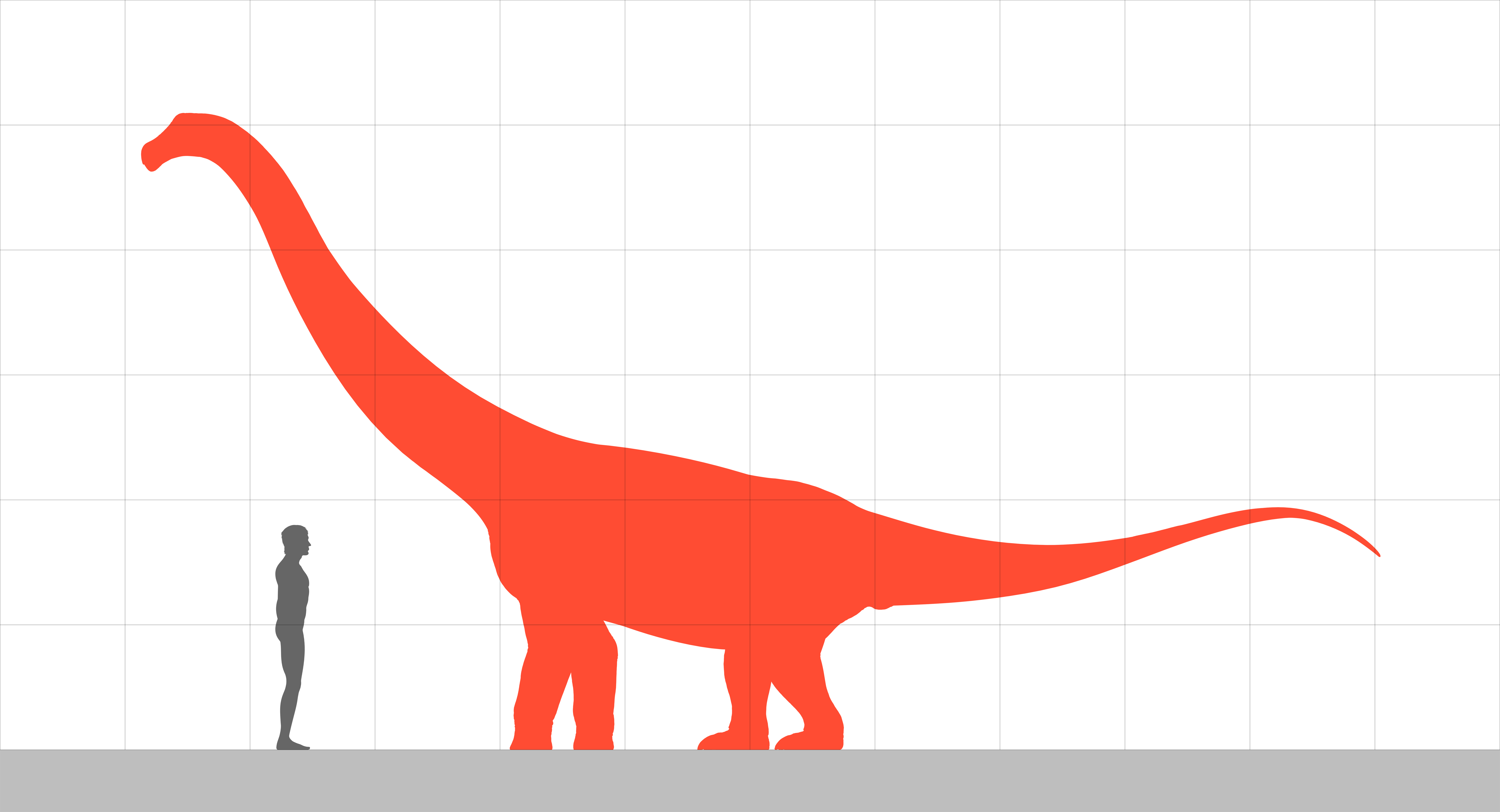
Size compared to a human

Quaesitosaurus was a large-sized titanosaur, with an estimated length of about 12 m (39 ft) based on relatives. The skull of Quaesitosaurus is less complete than that of Nemegtosaurus, another titanosaur also known only from isolated skull material from Mongolia. The dorsal processes of the maxillae and the premaxillae are missing, as are the jugals, lacrimals, prefrontal, and part of the frontals, so much of the skull anatomy is hypothetical, while the lower jaw is practically complete. As with Nemegtosaurus and Rapetosaurus, the skull was extended and fell forward, with the nasal openings located high at the skull at the level of the eye socket. The tooth crowns were long and thin. Wilson (1997) suspects that Quaesitosaurus and Nemegtosaurus could have been the same way. Kurzanov and Bannikov stated eight characteristics in their first description that distinguish Quaesitosaurus from Nemegtosaurus. However, many of these differences are actually due to the deformation of the skull and an inadequate description, as later studies showed.

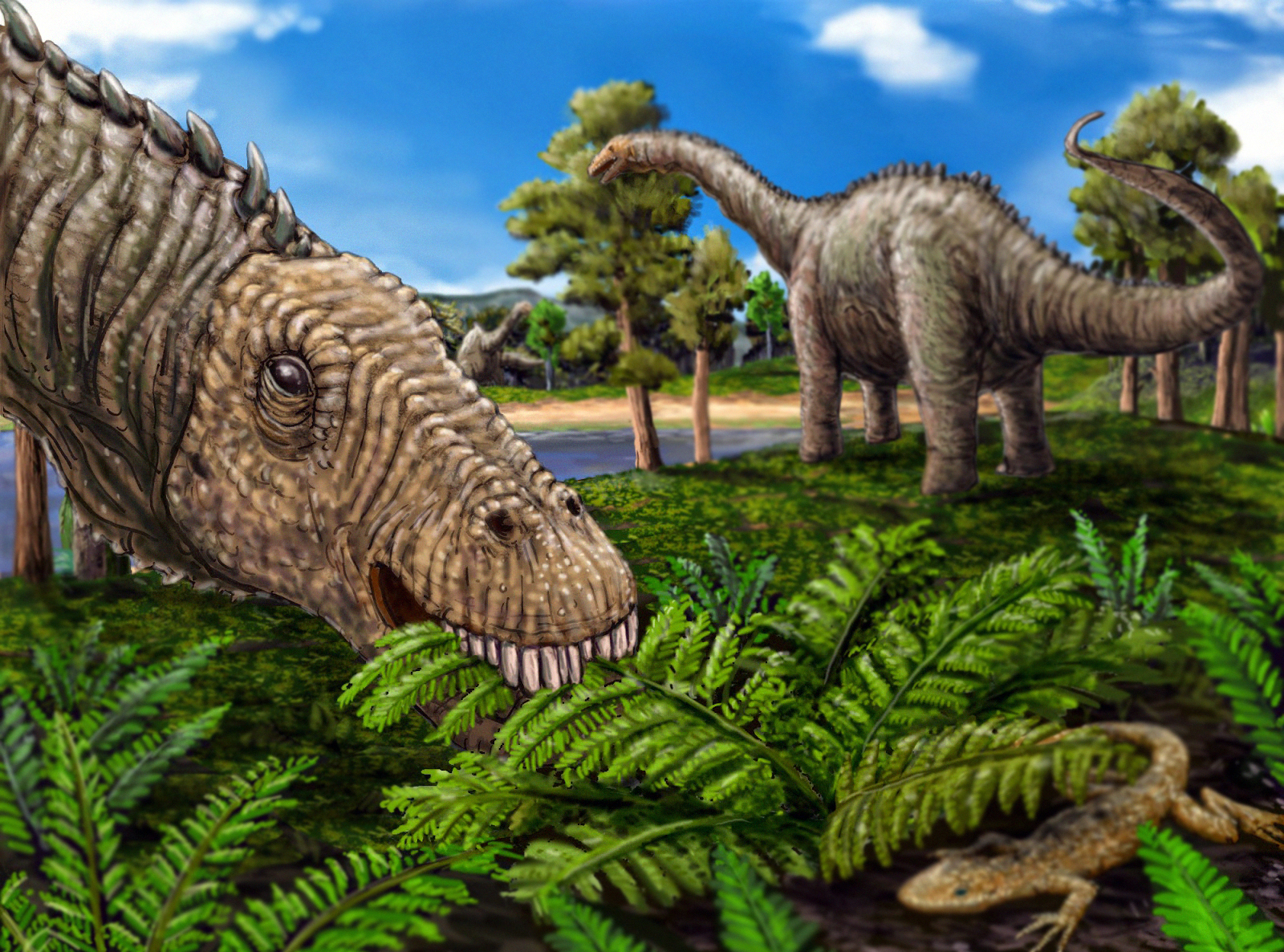
Restoration with hypothetical body

For example, according to Kurzanov and Bannikov, the skull of Quaesitosaurus was wider and showed a shorter scale leg (squamosum) without contact with the jugal, while the occipital condylus (which was rounded the head joint forming joint grinding of the back main area). Furthermore, these authors wrote that the side of the Quaesitosaurus' upper jaw had nine teeth, while it was only eight in Nemegtosaurus. The lower jaw's tooth row was also longer, so the authors stated. However, later studies recognized that some of the morphological differences were created by subsequent deformations of the skulls. The skull of Quaesitosaurus dorsoventrally (vertically) is compressed, while the skull of Nemegtosaurus is pressed at an angle. Others of the characteristics listed by Kurzanov and Bannikov, such as the shorter scale bone and the lower number of teeth, could not be confirmed or refuted by later studies due to poorly. Still other characteristics such as the occipital condylus are too minor to be able to be used as diagnostic characteristics and can also be attributed to individual variations. Wilson (2005) published an extensive new description of the Nemegtosaurus skull and found further characteristics (autapomorphies) that support the status of its own genus for Quaesitosaurus. For example, Quaesitosaurus shows, unlike Nemegtosaurus, pits in the front square, while a comb was not present on the rear post orbital.

== Classification ==
When Quaesitosaurus was originally described, it was placed with the Jurassic African Dicraeosaurus in Dicraeosauridae because it was one of the few other sauropods with preserved skulls known. However, recent analysis has placed Quaesitosaurus along with Nemegtosaurus in the Nemegtosauridae.

== Paleoenvironment ==
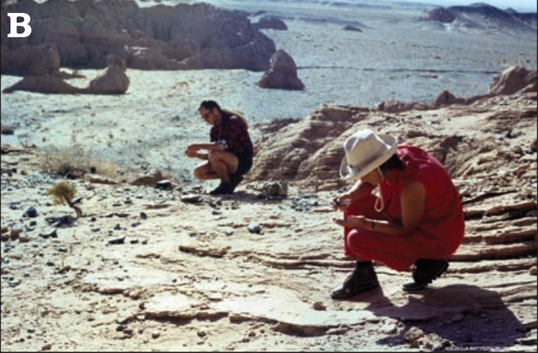
Field workers at the Khulsan locality of the Barun Goyot Formation

The Barun Goyot Formation, based on sediments, is regarded as Late Cretaceous in age (Middle-Upper Campanian). This formation is mostly characterized by a series of red beds, mostly light-coloured sands (yellowish, grey-brown, and rarely reddish) that are locally cemented. Sandy claystones (often red-coloured), siltstones, conglomerates, and large-scale trough cross-stratification in sands are also common across the unit. In addition, structureless, medium-grained, fine-grained, and very fine-grained sandstones predominate in sediments of the Barun Goyot Formation. The sediments of this formation were deposited in alluvial plain (flat land consisting of sediments deposited by highland rivers), lacustrine, and aeolian paleoenvironments, under relatively arid to semiarid climates.

Quaesitosaurus is endemic to the Barun Goyot Formation, which was also home to many other dinosaurs, including the ankylosaurids Saichania, Tarchia and Zaraapelta; alvarezsaurids Khulsanurus and Parvicursor; birds Gobipipus, Gobipteryx and Hollanda; protoceratopsids Bagaceratops and Breviceratops; dromaeosaurids Kuru and Shri devi; halszkaraptorine Hulsanpes; and oviraptorids Conchoraptor, Heyuannia and Nemegtomaia. Other taxa are represented by the pachycephalosaurid Tylocephale, and a wide diversity of mammals and squamates.
