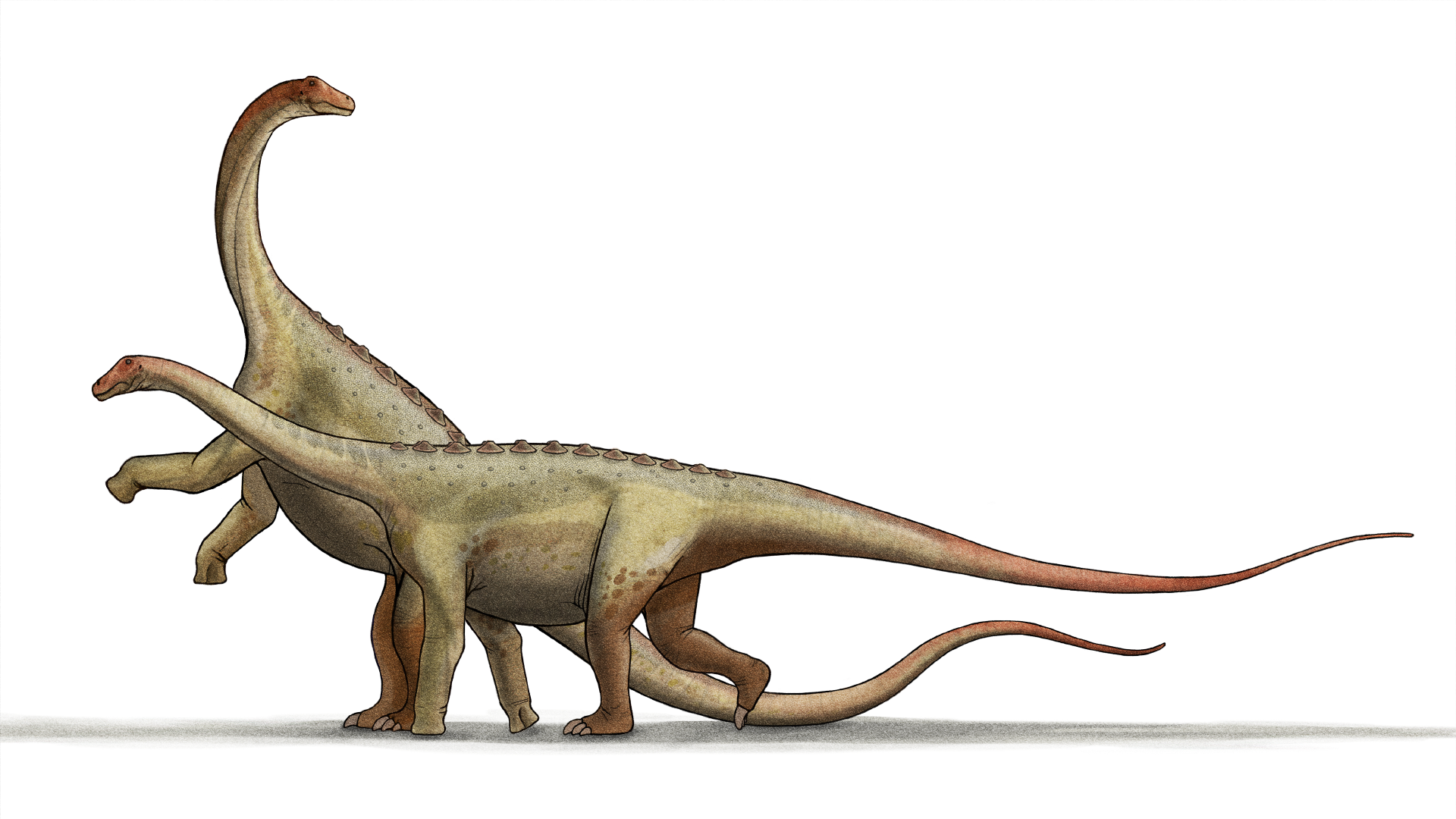
- Life restoration of Saltasaurus

Scientific classification
- Kingdom: Animalia
- Phylum: Chordata
- Class: Reptilia
- Clade: Dinosauria
- Clade: Saurischia
- Clade: †Sauropodomorpha
- Clade: †Sauropoda
- Clade: †Eusauropoda
- Clade: †Macronaria
- Clade: †Titanosauria
- Clade: †Lohuecosauria
- Family: †Saltasauridae; Powell, 1992

Genera
- †Igai; †Qingxiusaurus; †Quaesitosaurus?; †Zhuchengtitan; †Opisthocoelicaudiinae; †Saltasaurinae

Synonyms
- Balochisauridae Malkani, 2003

= Saltasauridae =

Saltasaurids Temporal range: Late Cretaceous, 85.8–66 Ma

Extinct family of dinosaurs

Saltasauridae (named after the Salta region of Argentina where they were first found) is a family of armored herbivorous sauropods from the Upper Cretaceous. They are known from fossils found in South America, Africa, Asia, North America, and Europe. They are characterized by their vertebrae and feet, which are similar to those of Saltasaurus, the first of the group to be discovered and the source of the name. The last and largest of the group and only one found in North America, Alamosaurus, was twenty-six metres (85 feet) in length and one of the last sauropods to go extinct.

Most of the saltasaurids were smaller, around fifteen metres (49 feet) in length, and one, Rocasaurus, was only eight metres (26 feet) long. Like all sauropods, the saltasaurids were quadrupeds, their necks and tails were held almost parallel to the ground, and their small heads had only tiny, peg-like teeth. They were herbivorous, stripping leaves off plants and digesting them in their enormous guts. Although large animals, they were smaller than other sauropods of their time, and many possessed distinctive additional defenses in the form of scutes along their backs.

== Description ==
As sauropods, the Saltasauridae are herbivorous saurischians with the characteristic body plan of a small head, long neck, four erect legs, and a counterbalancing tail. Most sauropods are from the clade Neosauropoda, which is further split into the narrow-toothed Diplodocoidea and the broad-toothed Macronaria. The Macronarians emerged in the Jurassic and a subclade, the Titanosauria, survived into the Cretaceous and spread across the continents. Because of their diversity, wide distribution, and the fragmentary or incomplete nature of most specimens, little is known about the titanosaurs beyond their size and tendency to have scutes.

The saltasaurids, one of the several titanosaur families, are recognized by the convexities in certain caudal vertebrae and the markings on their coracoid bones. All saltasaurids have thirty-five or fewer caudal vertebrae, each of which is convex on both sides of its centrum, and the one closest to the tail is shorter than the others. Their coracoid bones have rectangular margins on the anteroventral side, as well as a lip where they meet the infraglenoid. The Opisthocoelicaudiinae, a subfamily of the saltasaurids, are unique in that they lack phalanges in their forelimbs. Although Saltasaurus is known to possess dorsal osteoderms, scutes have not been discovered in all saltasaurids, and it is unclear when and where the evolution of osteoderms occurred in saltasaurids and titanosaurs in general.

== History of study ==
The first saltasaurid to be discovered was Alamosaurus, found by paleontologist Charles Gilmore in Utah in 1922. The next species would not be described until Opisthocoelicaudia was named by Magdalena Borsuk-Bialynicka from a postcranial material in Mongolia in 1977. In 1980, Jose Bonaparte and Jaime Powell discovered Saltasaurus in Argentina. This was the first sauropod to be discovered with armor and proved that sauropods had thrived in Cretaceous South America. Paul Sereno eventually recognized a cladistic relationship between Opisthocoelicauda and Saltasaurus to create the family Saltasauridae.

=== Classification ===
The group is defined by the characteristics shared by all with the two best-known members, Saltasaurus and Opisthocoelicaudia. Paleontologists J Wilson and P Upchurch defined the Saltasauridae in 2003 as the least inclusive clade containing Opisthocoelicaudia skarzynskii, and Saltasaurus loricatus, their most recent common ancestor, and all that species’ descendants.

=== Taxonomy ===
This taxonomy is based on those of González Riga et al. (2009) and Curry Rogers & Wilson (2005).

- Family Saltasauridae
  - Unclear Subfamilies
    - Petrobrasaurus puestohernandezi
    - Trigonosaurus pricei
  - Subfamily Opisthocoelicaudiinae
    - Alamosaurus sanjuanensis
    - Borealosaurus wimani
    - Opisthocoelicaudia skarzynskii
  - Subfamily Saltasaurinae
    - Bonatitan reigi
    - Microcoelus patagonicus
    - Neuquensaurus australis
    - Neuquensaurus robustus
    - Rocasaurus muniozi
    - Saltasaurus loricatus
    - Yamanasaurus lojaensis
    - Ibirania parva

=== Phylogeny ===
The family is then further divided into two subfamilies. Wilson and Upchurch defined Saltasaurinae in 2003 as the least-inclusive clade containing Saltasaurus but not Opisthocoelicaudia. The same paleontologists defined Opisthocoelicaudiinae as the inverse: the least-inclusive clade containing Opisthocoelicaudia but not Saltasaurus. Some species, due to the incompleteness of their skeletons, cannot yet be placed in either subfamily.

Saltasauridae in a cladogram after Navarro et al., 2022:

- Saltasauridae
  - Opisthocoelicaudiinae
    - Opisthocoelicaudia
    - Nemegtosaurus
  - Saltasaurinae
    - - Alamosaurus
      - Baurutitan
    - - - Ibirania
        - - Bonatitan
          - Rocasaurus
      - Saltasaurini
        - Neuquensaurus
        - - MACN-PV-RN 233
          - Saltasaurus

== Paleobiology ==
=== Geographic range ===
Many fragmentary saltasaurids have been discovered since 1980, placing members of the family in territories as widely dispersed as today's Australia, Madagascar, and France, in addition to their earlier-known residencies in North and South America. Like the other titanosaurs, the saltasaurids where a widespread, successful group that colonized all continents in the Cretaceous.

=== Feeding habits ===
Like all titanosaurs, the saltasaurids possessed small, peg-like teeth that were not usable for chewing. Coproliths from an unidentified titanosaur found in India suggest a diet of conifers, cycads, and early species of grasses. Unable to chew and probably lacking gastroliths, sauropods survived by retaining plant matter in their stomachs for long periods of time, fermenting it to extract as many resources as possible. Their long necks allowed them to graze over a large area while standing, reducing energy use.

=== Osteoderms ===
The osteoderms of Saltasaurus consisted of numerous, large bony plates embedded in the dorsal skin, each surrounded by a pattern of smaller plates. The large osteoderms contained some hollow spaces for blood vessels and spongy trabecular bone, while the small ones were solid. Patches of skin from unidentified Cretaceous titanosaurs have revealed similar scale patterns in embryos (a large scale surrounded by ten smaller ones) but no bone or mineralized structure, suggesting that, like crocodiles, those saltasaurids that possessed armor only developed it some time after hatching. Analysis of the osteoderms of the titanosaur Rapetosaurus revealed that the bones were hollow in adults, while those of juveniles were solid pieces similar to those in crocodiles. Paleontologist Kristina Curry Rogers, who made this discovery, theorized that the adult animals used their hollow osteoderms to store minerals during lean times. It is unknown whether any of the Saltasauridae used their osteoderms in a similar manner.

=== Reproduction and development ===
The same Argentine dig site, Auca Mahuevo, that provided information on embryonic skin, has also yielded information on the nesting habits of titanosaurs, but not saltasaurids specifically. The nests were constructed on the surface by piling debris in a ring around the eggs, with the eggs themselves left uncovered. Each egg was porous and spherical, about 14 cm in diameter, and they were laid in clutches. The embryos show smaller rostrum and nares close to the anterior portion of the face compared to adult titanosaurs, suggesting that the nostrils may have moved towards the back of the head as the animal grew.
