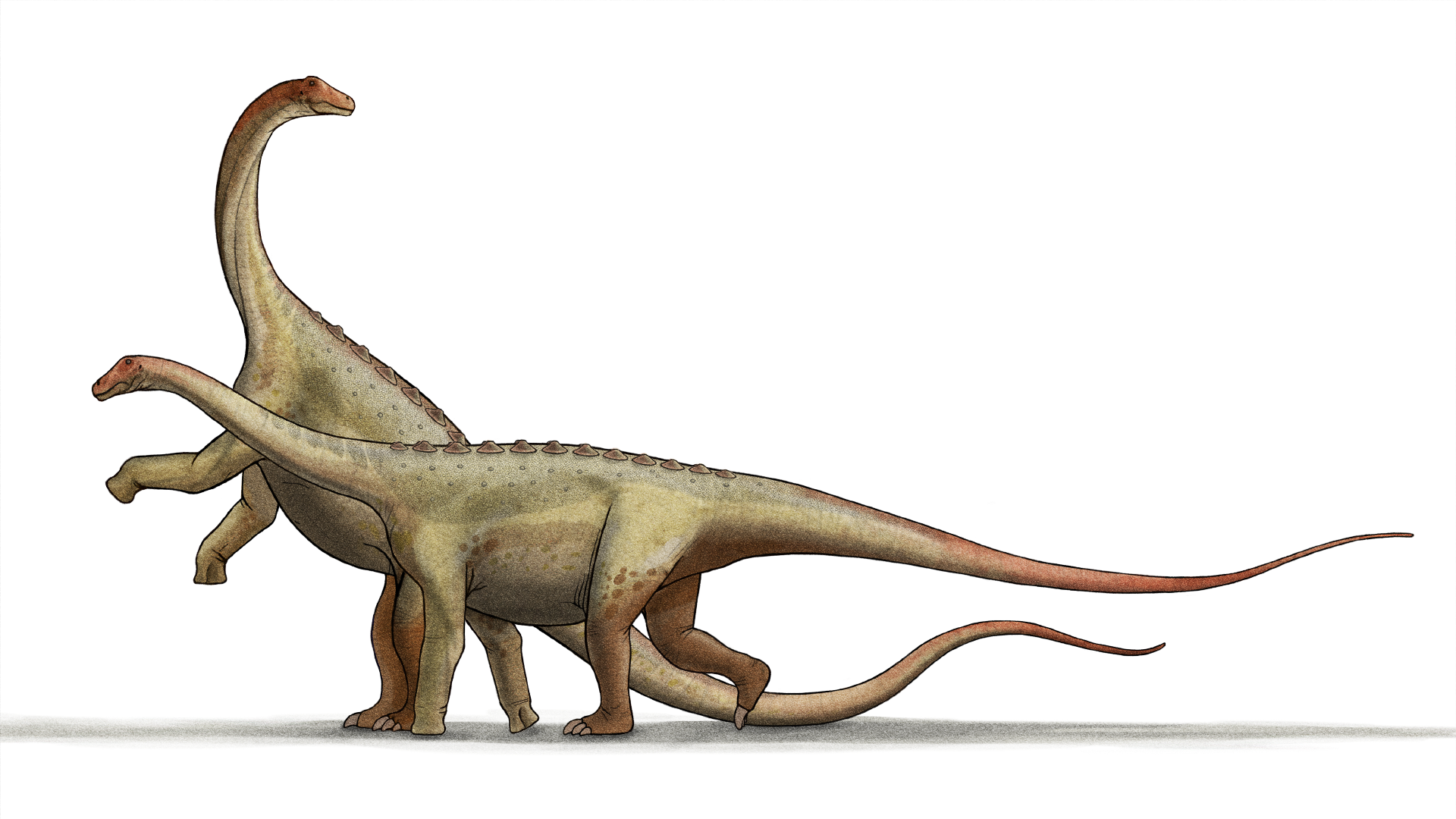
- Life restoration of Saltasaurus, the type species

Scientific classification
- Kingdom: Animalia
- Phylum: Chordata
- Class: Reptilia
- Clade: Dinosauria
- Clade: Saurischia
- Clade: †Sauropodomorpha
- Clade: †Sauropoda
- Clade: †Macronaria
- Clade: †Titanosauria
- Family: †Saltasauridae
- Subfamily: †Saltasaurinae; Powell, 1992

Type species
- †Saltasaurus loricatus Bonaparte and Powell, 1980

Genera
- †Abditosaurus; †Ibirania; †Loricosaurus; †Maxakalisaurus; †Paralititan; †Yamanasaurus; †Saltasaurini; †Bonatitan?; †Neuquensaurus; †Rocasaurus; †Saltasaurus

= Saltasaurinae =

Saltasaurines Temporal range: Late Cretaceous, 80–66 Ma

Extinct subfamily of dinosaurs

Saltasaurinae is a subfamily of titanosaurian sauropods known from the late Cretaceous period of South America, India and Madagascar.

== Description ==
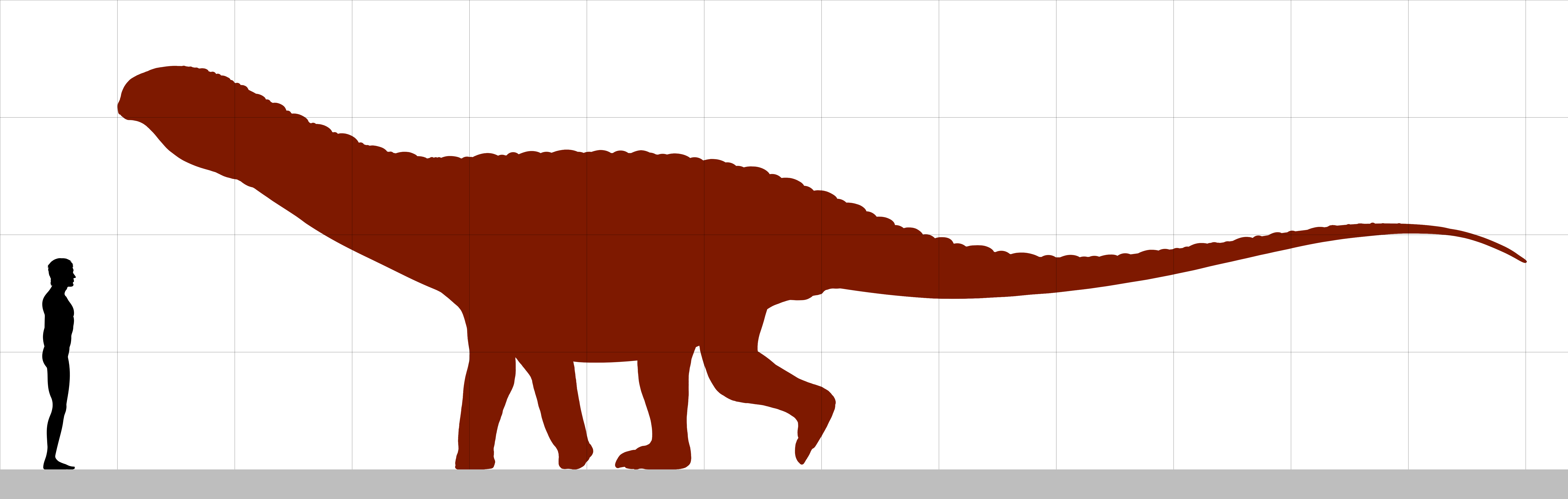
Size of Saltasaurus compared to a human

Saltasaurines are relatively small sauropods with the general body shape of a small head, long neck, four limbs, and a long tail. They range from the small Ibirania at around 5.7 m (19 ft), to the larger Neuquensaurus at 15 m (49 ft). A currently unnamed fragmentary sauropod from Madagascar may turn out to be a saltasaurine longer than Neuquensaurus. The weight of saltasaurines is very light compared to that of some of the largest dinosaurs. Thomas R. Holtz Jr. found the genera range from around 7,000 to 21,000 kg (15,000 to 46,000 lb), with Saltasaurus and an unnamed genus on both extremes, respectively.

Saltasaurinae is the only known group of sauropods found with armour from almost every species. The most probable reason for the bony studs and plates is that it evolved for defence against theropods like Abelisaurus and Carnotaurus. Saltasaurine armour has led to controversies; in 1929, the paleontologist Friedrich von Huene named the genus Loricosaurus for armour he thought to be from ankylosaurians. These bones were found to have similarities to those later discovered on sauropods like Saltasaurus and Neuquensaurus, and as such, Loricosaurus may be the same as one of the other genera.

== Age and distribution ==
Saltasaurines lived in the late Cretaceous, from the early Campanian to the Maastrichtian (about 80–66 million years ago) when they went extinct along with all other non-avian dinosaurs. Saltasaurus is the only named Saltasaurine that lived later in the Maastrichtian than 68 million years ago. Loricosaurus and Neuquensaurus lived around 71 million years ago and the later surviving Jainosaurus lived around 68 million years ago. An unnamed Saltasaurine from Madagascar would have probably survived later, until the Cretaceous-Paleogene extinction event, around 66 million years ago.

The subfamily Saltasaurinae is known almost completely from the Southern Hemisphere with South American forms. Jainosaurus and Abditosaurus are two of the only definite saltasaurines from outside the Southern Hemisphere and is two of the only ones from outside of South America.

== Classification ==
In a 1992 study on Saltasaurus, Jaime Powell named Saltasaurinae, a new subfamily within Titanosauridae (a family now considered invalid). He found many features uniting the group, consisting of the type genus and Neuquensaurus. This group was later supported and defined by Salgado et al. (1997). They defined the subfamily as "the clade including the most recent common ancestor of Neuquensaurus australis, Saltasaurus loricatus, and all of its descendants". They conducted a phylogeny and found that the subfamily was sister to Alamosaurus and only included Neuquensaurus and Saltasaurus. Paul Sereno defined it in 1998, unaware of Salgado's work and gave it a new definition as a stem clade. His definition was "All saltasaurids more closely related to Saltasaurus than to Opisthocoelicaudia". In 2003, Jeffrey A. Wilson and Paul Upchurch elaborated on this definition to "all Saltasauridae more closely related to Saltasaurus loricatus than to Opisthocoelicaudia skaryzinskii".

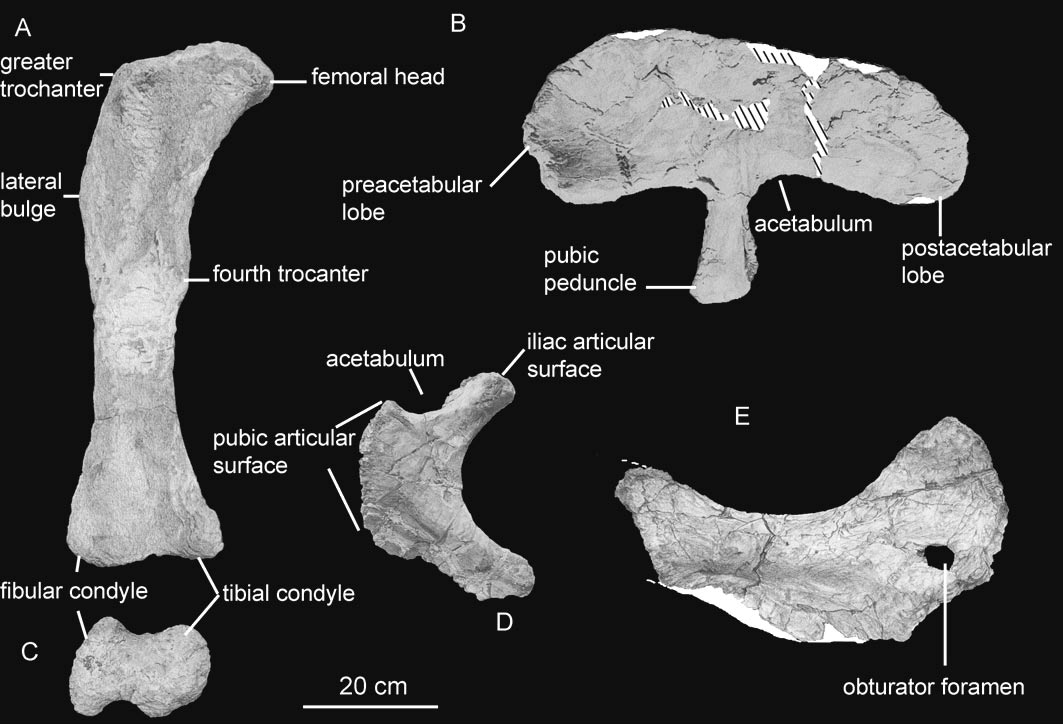
Bones of Rocasaurus

Below is a cladogram by Villa et al. (2022), from the description of the European saltasaurine Abditosaurus.

- Saltasauridae
  - Lognkosauria
  - - Opisthocoelicaudiinae
      - - Mansourasaurus
        - Paludititan
      - - - Ampelosaurus
          - - Lirainosaurus
            - Opisthocoelicaudia
        - - Lohuecotitan
          - - Pellegrinisaurus
            - - Dreadnoughtus
              - - Alamosaurus
                - Baurutitan
    - Saltasaurinae
      - - Maxakalisaurus
        - - Paralititan
          - Abditosaurus
      - Saltasaurini
        - Neuquensaurus
        - Saltasaurus

Saltasaurini is a tribe within Saltasaurinae that contains the type genus, Saltasaurus, and its closest relatives. The clade was named in 2007 by Leonardo Salgado and José Bonaparte as the "least inclusive clade comprising Neuquensaurus and Saltasaurus", which is equivalent to the use of Saltasaurinae in Salgado et al. (1997). Found only in the Campanian to Maastrichtian sediments of the Neuquén Basin, Salgado & Bonaparte (2007) decided a more restrictive clade was needed because of the expansion of Saltasaurinae as defined to include far more taxa than it originally encompassed. Saltasaurini includes the original core of Saltasaurinae: Neuquensaurus, Saltasaurus, Rocasaurus and Bonatitan, although some studies exclude Bonatitan from the clade.
