= Lohuecotitan =

Lohuecotitan Temporal range: Late Cretaceous (late Campanian–early Maastrichtian), 72 Ma

Scientific classification
- Kingdom: Animalia
- Phylum: Chordata
- Class: Reptilia
- Clade: Dinosauria
- Clade: Saurischia
- Clade: †Sauropodomorpha
- Clade: †Sauropoda
- Clade: †Eusauropoda
- Clade: †Macronaria
- Clade: †Titanosauria
- Genus: †Lohuecotitan; Díez Díaz et al., 2016
- Species: †L. pandafilandi

Binomial name
- †Lohuecotitan pandafilandi Díez Díaz et al., 2016

Extinct genus of sauropod dinosaur

Lohuecotitan is an extinct genus of titanosaurian sauropod dinosaur known from the Late Cretaceous of Spain. The only species known in the genus is Lohuecotitan pandafilandi, described and named in 2016.

== Discovery and naming ==
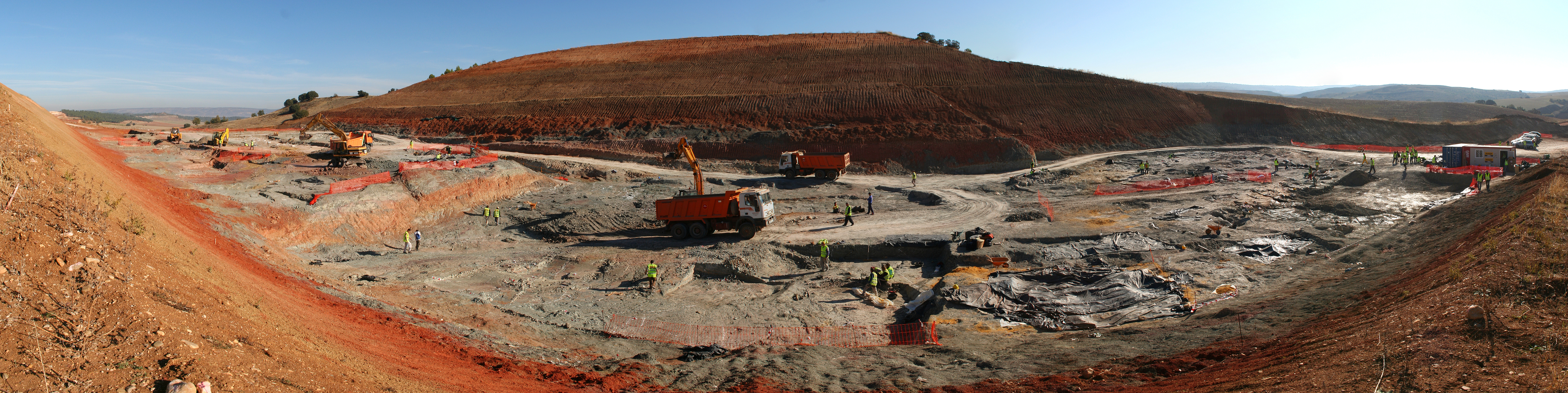
The fossil site of Lo Hueco in 2007, where remains of Lohuecotitan have been found.

The fossil remains of Lohuecotitan were discovered in the site of Lo Hueco, Fuentes, Cuenca, which is part of the Villalba de la Sierra Formation. The formation dates from the Upper Campanian to the Lower Maastrichtian, and would have represented a muddy coastal floodplain. The locality was discovered in 2007 during the cutting of a little hill for installation of the railway of the Madrid-Valencia high-speed train. More than 10 000 fossils have been collected, almost half of which belong to titanosaurs comprising more than twenty sets of partial skeletons in anatomical connection or with a low dispersion of their skeletal elements. Teeth and braincases were also recovered. The material belongs to at least two distinct types of titanosaur. The holotype specimen of Lohuecotitan, HUE-EC-01, is a disarticulated partial skeleton consisting of cervical, dorsal, sacral, and caudal vertebrae, ribs, an ulna, both ischia, a pubis, a femur, a fibula, and a tibia, along with some indeterminate remains.

The name of Lohuecotitan combines a reference to the type locality with titan (which refers to the Greek titans). The specific name, pandafilandi, is derived from the name of a giant, Pandafilando de la fosca vista, in the novel Don Quixote. The character is named "Pandafilando of the Scowl" in John Ormsby's translation.

== Description ==
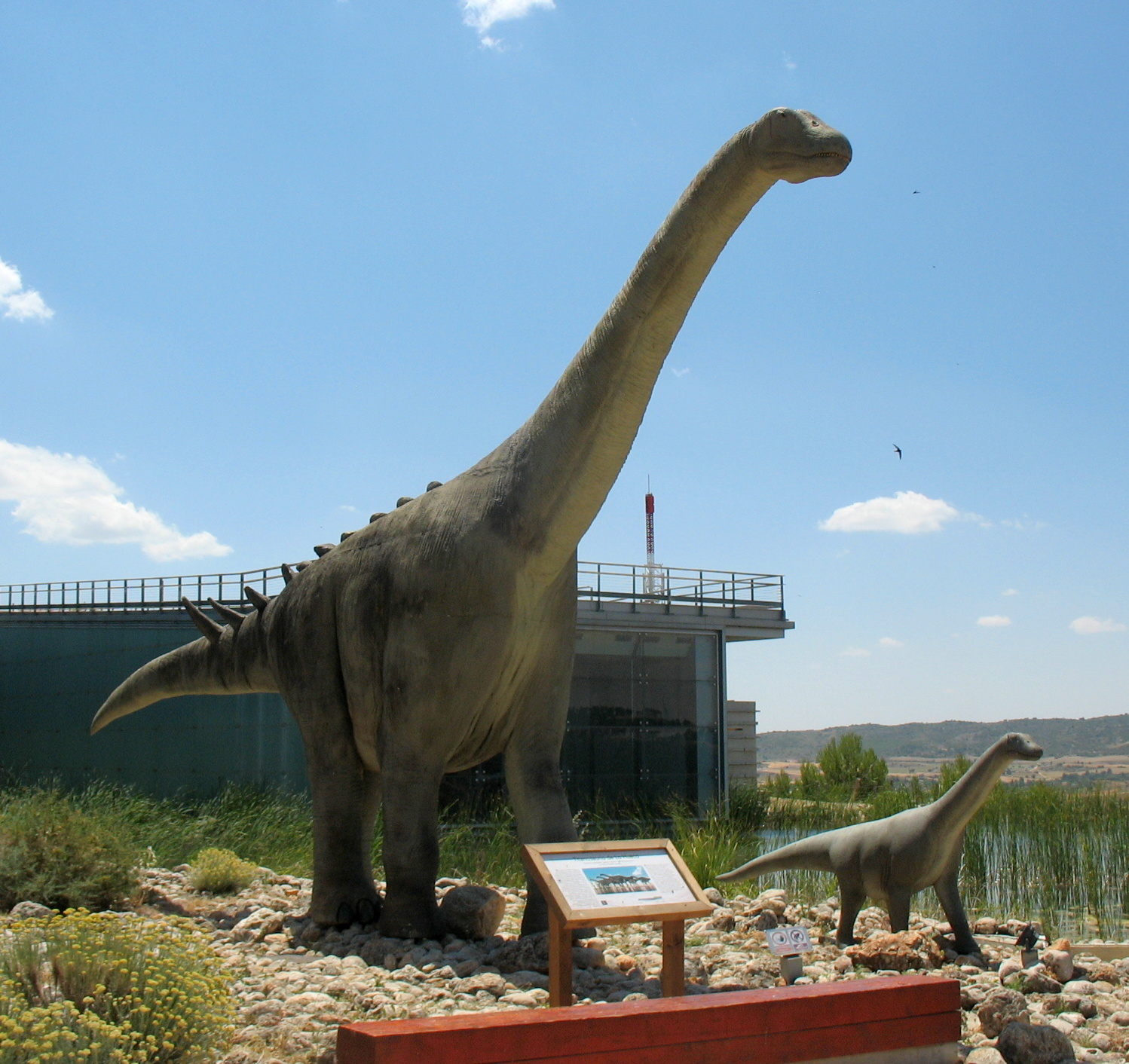
Statue of adult Lohuecotitan and juvenile outside the Castilla-La Mancha Paleontological Museum

Lohuecotitan was recognized by its describers as having a number of unique characteristics (autapomorphies) not seen in other titanosaurs. In the dorsal vertebrae, the edges of the postspinal laminae extend outwards. In the first several caudal vertebrae, the medial spinoprezygapophyseal and spinopostzygapophyseal laminae respectively connect to the prespinal and postspinal laminae on the bottom surface. In addition, due to the way that the prespinal and postspinal laminae project upwards, the neural spine of the vertebra appears to be V-shaped from the side, and resemble a Greek cross in cross-section. Each middle caudal vertebra has two roughened structures that extend from the top of the back face onto the top surface of the vertebra. Finally, the bottom portion of each half of the haemal arches in the posterior caudal vertebrae is split fully into two articular facets. These traits form a unique combination not seen in other titanosaurs, along with the centrodiapophyseal laminae being widened on the top and bottom edges in the front and middle dorsal vertebrae (as also seen in Saltasaurus), and a rounded protrusion being present between the front and side trochanters of the fibula (also seen in Jainosaurus).

A number of the bones of Lohuecotitan were internally pneumatized, including the cervical vertebrae, sacral vertebrae, and ilium. As is common in somphospondylans, the pneumatic fossae on the cervical vertebrae are shallow; this was also the case in the dorsal vertebrae. The cervical and dorsal vertebrae are opisthocoelous; the caudal vertebrae were procoelous (a characteristic common in Lithostrotia). The seventh and eighth tail vertebrae are fused together; this probably represents a pathology. As in other titanosauriforms, the dorsal ribs are compressed and blade-like. The ulna was robust, and the bottom surface of the tibia was oval-shaped, as is common in titanosaurs.

=== Braincase ===
Braincase first attributed to Ampelosaurus sp. then to Lohuecotitan, and CT scans

In 2013 Knoll and colleagues tentatively assigned to an unnamed species of Ampelosaurus, A. sp., a fossil braincase from Lo Hueco. However, in 2019 Knoll et al. finally referred this braincase to Lohuecotitan. This assignment is based on the fact that another braincase morphotype from Lo Hueco was found to be associated with a titanosaur skeleton distinct from Lohuecotitan and because none of the very abundant titanosaur postcranial remains of Lo Hueco belong to Ampelosaurus. The braincase was found to share many features with A. atacis, such as a back of the skull that is flat. The braincase, MCCM-HUE-8741, is small in size overall, with a front-to-back length of 100.8 millimetres (3.97 in), and the maximum width of the left half being 64.3 millimetres (2.53 in). Parts of the bottom half of the braincase are missing. Even though section are missing, the specimen does not appear to have been deformed much, as the left and right halves are not very different.

Two frontals are preserved. They are each 57.3 millimetres (2.26 in) long and 64.3 millimetres (2.53 in) wide. The upper surface of each frontal is not smooth. One crest runs along the each frontal, and the together the two crests make up the orbital roof. Both parietals have also been found. The connection between them is marked by a ω-shaped crest. Viewed from the side, the parietal has two extensions. These extensions are not fully preserved, but they would have been on the border of the upper temporal fenestrae in their middle. Each parietal was preserved as 79.6 millimetres (3.13 in) wide. The basioccipital of Lohuecotitan is unique as it has an occipital condyle that is much wider than tall. The occipital condyle has an irregular surface that was probably caused by the loss of the original cartilaginous covering. The complete braincase was especially low in the skull, and was oriented to the side. The occipital condyle is 28.6 millimetres (1.13 in) wide and 15.8 millimetres (0.62 in) tall. The braincase floor is made by the parabasisphenoid. The prootic is a tall but not long bone. The basisphenoid is mostly on the side of it, along with the laterosphenoid, the parietal, and the otoccipital. The length of the prootic from the front to the back is around 10.6 millimetres (0.42 in).

==== Neuroanatomy ====
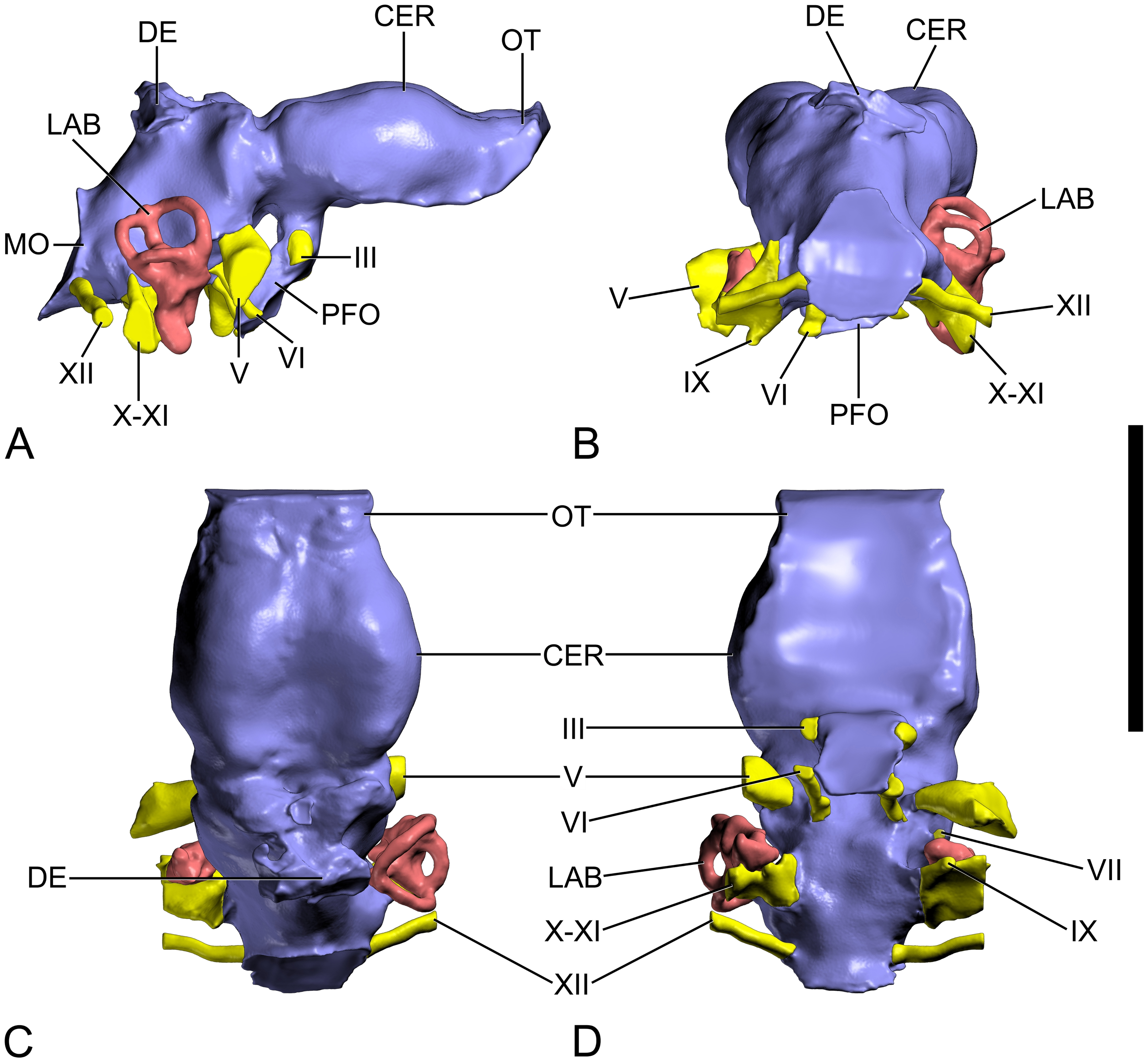
Endocast of the brain showing the labyrinth

Compared with Giraffititan, the inner ear of Lohuecotitan shows a more basal morphology. That feature is possibly related to a restricted range of possible movements that involve head-turning.

Like in Jainosaurus and most other non-avian archosaurs, the hindbrain and midbrain of Lohuecotitan is relatively poorly preserved in the endocast. In contrast with TMM 40435 and a few other taxa such as cf. Cetiosaurus oxoniensis and Giraffatitan, no characteristic "nub" of the cerebellum can be seen. As in TMM 40435 and many other archosaurs, the back of the brain is especially narrow in Lohuecotitan.

The cerebral region of the brain is separated from the rest of the brain by a distinct compression caused in the endocranial cavity. The rearmost part of the cerebral region of the braincase has a top with a small expansion. This is different from Jainosaurus. However, relatively much larger expansions are known in the diplodocoid sauropods Dicraeosaurus and Diplodocus. In MCCM-HUE-8741, the small opening in the skull roof middle is responsible for a swelling on the endocast that is suggestive of a pineal system. It is in the exact position where the pineal gland is expected to have been, between the forebrain and the midbrain.

The semicircular canals are contracted, and they are highly curved. The semicircular system of MCCM-HUE-8741 shows also a basal morphology, because the semicircular canals do not attach to each other.

== Classification ==
Lohuecotitan was in 2016 recovered as a lithostrotian titanosaur, more derived than Malawisaurus. Its position among the lithostrotians is supported by the sharp angle of its zygapophyseal articulations. The consensus of the 20 most parsimonious phylogenetic trees recovered is shown below.

- Lithostrotia
  - Malawisaurus dixeyi
  - - Trigonosaurus pricei
    - Lohuecotitan pandafilandi
    - Alamosaurus sanjuanensis
    - Opisthocoelicaudia skarzynskii
    - Nemegtosaurus mongoliensis
    - Saltasaurinae
      - Neuquensaurus australis
      - Saltasaurus loricatus
    - - Rapetosaurus krausei
      - - Isisaurus colberti
        - Tapuiasaurus macedoi

More recently, Mocho et al. (2019) in a cladistic analysis, recovered Lohuecotitan within Lithostrotia as a sister species of the European species Paludititan.

- Lithostrotia
  - Malawisaurus
  - - - Paludititan
      - Lohuecotitan
    - - Epachthosaurus
      - - - Opisthocoelicaudiinae
            - Alamosaurus
            - Opisthocoelicaudia
        - - - Saltasaurinae
              - Neuquensaurus
              - - Rocasaurus
                - Saltasaurus
          - - - Lirainosaurinae
                - Lirainosaurus
                - - Atsinganosaurus
                  - Ampelosaurus
            - - Bonatitan
              - - - Rapetosaurus
                  - Nemegtosaurus
                - - Aeolosaurinae
                    - Gondwanatitan
                    - Aeolosaurus
                  - Rinconsauria
                    - Rinconsaurus
                    - - Muyelensaurus
                      - - Bonitasaura
                        - Lognkosauria
                          - Mendozasaurus
                          - Futalognkosaurus

In the same year, Gorscak & O'Connor (2019) in their description of Mnyamawamtuka recovered Lohuecotitan as a saltasaurid.

- Titanosauria
  - - Karongasaurus
    - - - Argentinosaurus
        - - Andesaurus
          - Ligabuesaurus
      - - Jiangshanosaurus
        - - - Angolatitan
            - Malarguesaurus
          - - Chubutisaurus
            - Wintonotitan
  - - Tastavinsaurus
    - Lithostrotia
      - - Malawisaurus
        - Mnyamawamtuka
      - - Tapuiasaurus
        - - Normanniasaurus
          - - - - Rinconsaurus
                - - Isisaurus
                  - Rapetosaurus
              - - Muyelensaurus
                - - Bonitasaura
                  - - Gondwanatitan
                    - - - Panamericansaurus
                        - - Overosaurus
                          - Shingopana
                      - - Trigonosaurus
                        - - Aeolosaurus
                          - Argyrosaurus
            - - Diamantinasaurus
              - - Patagotitan
                - Saltasauridae
                  - - Paralititan
                    - - Maxakalisaurus
                      - - Neuquensaurus
                        - Saltasaurus
                  - - - Epachthosaurus
                      - - Futalognkosaurus
                        - - Mendozasaurus
                          - - Atsinganosaurus
                            - Notocolossus
                    - - Rukwatitan
                      - - - Lohuecotitan
                          - Nemegtosaurus
                        - - - Lirainosaurus
                            - Opisthocoelicaudia
                          - - - Ampelosaurus
                              - - Mansourasaurus
                                - Paludititan
                            - - Pellegrinisaurus
                              - - Dreadnoughtus
                                - - Alamosaurus
                                  - Baurutitan

== See also ==
- 2016 in paleontology
