= Garrigatitan =

Garrigatitan Temporal range: Late Cretaceous, 74–70 Ma

Scientific classification
- Kingdom: Animalia
- Phylum: Chordata
- Class: Reptilia
- Clade: Dinosauria
- Clade: Saurischia
- Clade: †Sauropodomorpha
- Clade: †Sauropoda
- Clade: †Macronaria
- Clade: †Titanosauria
- Clade: †Lithostrotia
- Subfamily: †Lirainosaurinae
- Genus: †Garrigatitan; Díez Díaz et al., 2021
- Species: †G. meridionalis

Binomial name
- †Garrigatitan meridionalis Díez Díaz et al., 2021

Extinct genus of reptiles

Garrigatitan (meaning "garrigue giant") is a genus of titanosaurian dinosaur from the late Cretaceous Period of the Grès à Reptiles Formation in France. The genus contains a single species, Garrigatitan meridionalis.

== Discovery and naming ==
Between 2009 and 2012, excavations were carried out at Velaux-La Bastide Neuve by the Palaios Association and the University of Poitiers. During the excavations, the holotype of Garrigatitan was discovered along with the remains of Atsinganosaurus, another titanosaurian.

In 2021, the type species Garrigatitan meridionalis was named and described by Verónica Díez Díaz, Géraldine Garcia, Xabier Pereda Suberbiola, Benjamin Jentgen-Ceschino, Koen Stein, Pascal Godefroit and Xavier Valentin. The holotype, MMS / VBN.09.17, was found in a layer of sandstone of the Begudian, the second level of the second series, dating back to the late Campanian. It consists of a sacrum belonging to an immature individual.

Additional fossil material has been assigned to the species including a cervical vertebra, two humeri, a left ilium, and a right ischial bone. Other specimens recovered include a neural spine, a right humerus, part of the right leg, and a left femur. The assigned specimens come from the third level of the second series. The fossils were found within an area of 375 square meters and a thickness of 1.2 metres (3.9 ft). They were not associated and presumably represent different individuals. They are all part of the Moulin Seigneurial de Velaux collection.

The generic name, Garrigatitan, is a combination of the Occitan "garriga," meaning "dry thicket", referring to a type of Mediterranean vegetation characterized by drought-resistant shrubs, and the Greek "titan", after the Greek mythological family of giants. The specific epithet, meridonalis, means "southern" in Latin, in reference to the discovery location in southern France.

== Description ==
Some Garrigatitan specimens are regarded as subadults or adults belonged to individuals measuring 4–6 metres (13–20 ft) long and weighing 2–2.5 metric tons (2.2–2.8 short tons). A tentatively referred specimen belonged to an adult individual measuring about 12–16 metres (39–52 ft) long.

== Classification ==
In their phylogenetic analysis, Díez Díaz et al. recovered Garrigatitan as a membr of the titanosaur subfamily Lirainosaurinae. These results are displayed in the cladogram below:

- Lirainosaurinae
  - Lirainosaurus
  - - Atsinganosaurus
    - - Ampelosaurus
      - Garrigatitan

In their 2024 description of Qunkasaura, Mocho et al. included Garrigatitan in their phylogenetic analysis, recovering it as a late-diverging non-lirainosaurine within the Lognkosauria, closely related to the South American genera Notocolossus, Patagotitan, and Puertasaurus. Alongside Normanniasaurus, it is the only named European titanosaur within the broader clade Colossosauria. However, the authors noted that this position should not be taken with full confidence due to the fragmentary nature of the Garrigatitan possibly confounding the results, as well as the fact that the material initially referred to the genus can not be assigned to it with confidence.
