= Argiles et Grès à Reptiles Formation =

Geologic formation in France

- Stratigraphic range: Campanian-Early Maastrichtian, 74–70 Ma
- Type: Geological formation
- Underlies: Calcaire de Rognac
- Thickness: Over 40 m (130 ft)

Lithology
- Primary: Clay, shale
- Other: Sandstone

Location
- Coordinates: 43.5°N 5.5°E
- Approximate paleocoordinates: 36.1°N 4.0°E
- Region: Provence-Alpes-Cote d'Azur, Bouches-du-Rhône
- Country: France
- Extent: Aix-en-Provence Basin
- Argiles et Grès à Reptiles Formation (France)

Argiles et Grès à Reptiles Formation (meaning Reptile Clay and Sandstone) also known as the Argiles Rutilantes Formation is an early Maastrichtian French geologic formation in the département of Var preserving the remains of several types of dinosaurs and other extinct organisms.

== Fossil content ==
An abelisaurid similar to Arcovenator is known from Département des Bouches-du-Rhone, while enantiornithean and indeterminate avialan remains are known from Département du Var.

Color key: Taxon / Reclassified taxon / Taxon falsely reported as present / Dubious taxon or junior synonym / Ichnotaxon / Ootaxon / Morphotaxon	Notes; Uncertain or tentative taxa are in small text; ~~crossed out~~ taxa are discredited.

=== Dinosaurs ===
==== Ornithischians ====
Ornithischians of the Argiles et Grès à Reptiles Formation
Genus	Species	Location	Stratigraphic position	Material	Notes	Images
Matheronodon	M. provincialis	Velaux-La Bastide Neuve	Lower	A single maxilla and associated teeth	A rhabdodontid ornithopod	
Obelignathus	O. septimanicus	Montouliers, Saint-Chinian commune	Lower	An isolated right dentary, missing the anterior (front) part.	A rhabdodontomorph iguanodontian	
Rhabdodon	R. priscus	La Nerthe	Upper	A left dentary, teeth, and postcranial material	A rhabdodontid ornithopod	
Rhabdodon	R. sp	Basségat, La Bastide Neuve, Métisson	Upper	Multiple specimens	A rhabdodontid ornithopod	
Struthiosaurus	S. languedocensis	L'Olivet Quarry, Villeveyrac	Upper	A partial skeleton consists of a complete synsacrum, pelvic girdle, and four caudal-most dorsal vertebrae	A struthiosaurin nodosaurine	

==== Sauropods ====
Sauropods of the Argiles et Grès à Reptiles Formation
Genus	Species	Location	Stratigraphic position	Material	Notes	Images
Ampelosaurus	A. atacis	Bellevue locality	Upper	Three dorsal vertebrae	A lirainosaurine lithostrotian titanosaur	
Atsinganosaurus	A. velauciensis	La Bastide Neuve, Velaux	Lower/Upper	A partial skeleton consists of vertebrae, teeth, and sacrum.	A lirainosaurine lithostrotian titanosaur	
Garrigatitan	G. meridionalis	Velaux-La-Bastide Neuve	Upper	A holotype consists of a cervical rib, a right humerus, a right ulna, and a left femur.	A lirainosaurine lithostrotian titanosaur	
Hypselosaurus	H. priscus		Lower	A partial femur, fibula and possible tibia and a pair of associated caudal vertebrae.	A titanosaurian sauropod	

==== Theropods ====
Theropods of the Argiles et Grès à Reptiles Formation
Genus	Species	Location	Stratigraphic position	Material	Notes	Images
Abelisauridae indet.	Indeterminate				A large abelisaurid that was similar to Arcovenator.	Arcovenator Gargantuavis Pyroraptor Variraptor
Arcovenator	A. escotae	Jas Neuf Sud	Lower	A complete basicranium articulated with its right postorbital, a tooth, a left squamosal, an anterior caudal vertebra and a right tibia.	A large majungasaurine abelisaurid	Arcovenator Gargantuavis Pyroraptor Variraptor
Castignovolucris	C. sebei	Castigno valley	Lower	A right coracoid	An enantiornithean bird	Arcovenator Gargantuavis Pyroraptor Variraptor
Gargantuavis	G. philoinos		Lower	A fragmentary synsacrum	A large avialan	Arcovenator Gargantuavis Pyroraptor Variraptor
Martinavis	M. cruzyensis	Massecaps locality	Lower	A complete right humerus	An enantiornithean bird	Arcovenator Gargantuavis Pyroraptor Variraptor
Pyroraptor	P. olympius	La Boucharde locality	Lower/Upper	Paratypes consist of the equivalent claw of the right foot, the left second metatarsal, a complete second toe claw, a right ulna (long forearm bone), two teeth, five pedal digits, one manual digit, a piece of a metacarpal, a right radius, a dorsal vertebra, and a tail vertebra.	A dromaosaurid theropod	Arcovenator Gargantuavis Pyroraptor Variraptor
Theropoda indet.	Indeterminate				Previously referred to "Megalosaurus" pannoniensis.	Arcovenator Gargantuavis Pyroraptor Variraptor
Variraptor	V. mechinorum	La Bastide Neuve	Lower	A posterior dorsal vertebra, a sacrum with five fused vertebrae, and an ilium	A dromaeosaurid theropod	Arcovenator Gargantuavis Pyroraptor Variraptor

=== Pterosaurs ===
Pterosaurs of the Argiles et Grès à Reptiles Formation
Genus	Species	Location	Stratigraphic position	Material	Notes	Images
Mistralazhdarcho	M. maggii	Velaux–La Bastide Neuve	Lower	A partial skeleton	An azhdarchid pterosaur	

=== Crocodilians ===
Crocodilians of the Argiles et Grès à Reptiles Formation
Genus	Species	Location	Stratigraphic position	Material	Notes	Images
Acynodon	A. iberoccitanus				A eusuchian crocodylomorph	
Alligatoridae indet.	Indeterminate					
Allodaposuchus	A. iberoarmoricanus	Velaux-La Bastide Neuve	Lower	A partial skull	An allodaposuchid eusuchian	
Crocodylidae indet.	Indeterminate					
Lohuecosuchus	L. mechinorum			Skull & mandible	An allodaposuchid eusuchian	

=== Turtles ===
Turtles of the Argiles et Grès à Reptiles Formation
Genus	Species	Location	Stratigraphic position	Material	Notes	Images
Calissounemys	C. matheroni				A compsemydid turtle	
Foxemys	F. mechinorum				A bothremydid turtle	
Polysternon	P. provinciale				A bothremydid turtle	

=== Fish ===
Fishes of the Argiles et Grès à Reptiles Formation
Genus	Species	Location	Stratigraphic position	Material	Notes	Images
Hybodontiformes indet.	Indeterminate					
Lepisosteidae indet.	Indeterminate					

=== Mammals ===
Mammals of the Argiles et Grès à Reptiles Formation
Genus	Species	Location	Stratigraphic position	Material	Notes	Images
Mistralestes	M. arcensis	La Cairanne-Highway	Lower	A mandible (Right dentary fragment with p5 to m3 and roots of p4).	A zhelestid eutherian	
Valentinella	V. vitrollense	Vitrolles-La Plaine		Damaged upper and lower jaw fragments.	A zhelestid eutherian	

=== Fossil eggs ===
Eggs of the Argiles et Grès à Reptiles Formation
Genus	Species	Location	Stratigraphic position	Material	Notes	Images
Megaloolithus	M. aureliensis					
Megaloolithus	M. petralta					
Megaloolithus	M. sp.					

=== Arthropods ===
Arthropods of the Argiles et Grès à Reptiles Formation
Genus	Species	Location	Stratigraphic position	Material	Notes	Images
Dinocarcinus	D. velauciensis	Velaux-La Bastide Neuve		Isolated claws	A large-sized portunoid crab	

=== Plants ===
Plants of the Alcântara Formation
Genus	Species	Location	Stratigraphic position	Material	Notes	Images
Amblyochara	A. begudiana					
Peckichara	P. cancellata					
Peckichara	P. pectinata					
Platychara	P. caudata					
Saportanella	S. maslovi					

== See also ==
- List of dinosaur-bearing stratigraphic units
- List of fossiliferous stratigraphic units in France
