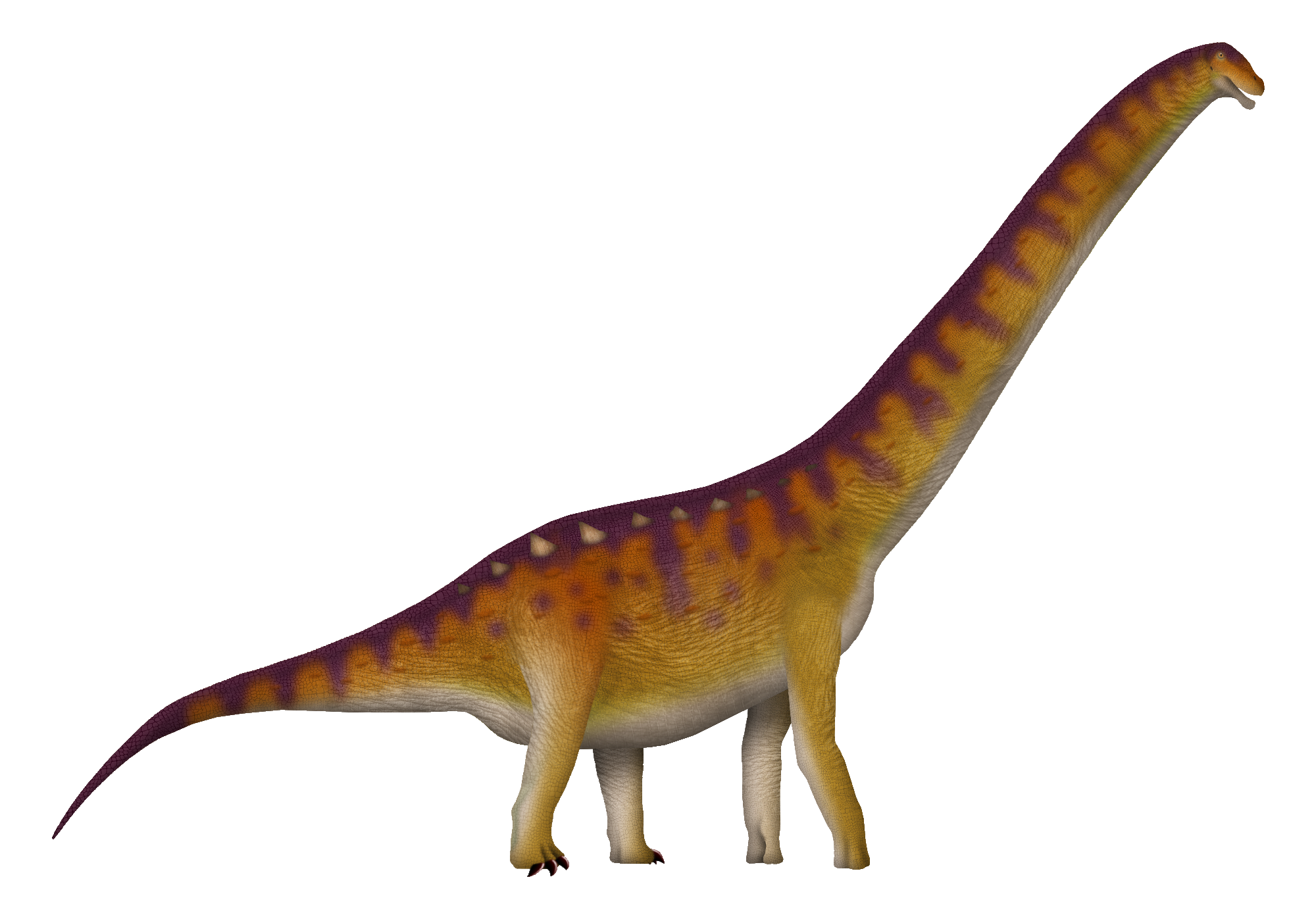
- Reconstruction

Scientific classification
- Kingdom: Animalia
- Phylum: Chordata
- Class: Reptilia
- Clade: Dinosauria
- Clade: Saurischia
- Clade: †Sauropodomorpha
- Clade: †Sauropoda
- Clade: †Macronaria
- Clade: †Titanosauria
- Family: †Saltasauridae
- Subfamily: †Opisthocoelicaudiinae
- Genus: †Qunkasaura; Mocho et al., 2024
- Species: †Q. pintiquiniestra

Binomial name
- †Qunkasaura pintiquiniestra Mocho et al., 2024

= Qunkasaura =

Qunkasaura Temporal range: Late Cretaceous, late Campanian–early Maastrichtian

Extinct genus of sauropod dinosaur

Qunkasaura is a genus of saltasauroid titanosaur dinosaur from the Late Cretaceous (Campanian–Maastrichtian) Lo Hueco site of the Villalba de la Sierra Formation of Spain. The type species is Qunkasaura pintiquiniestra.

== Discovery and naming ==
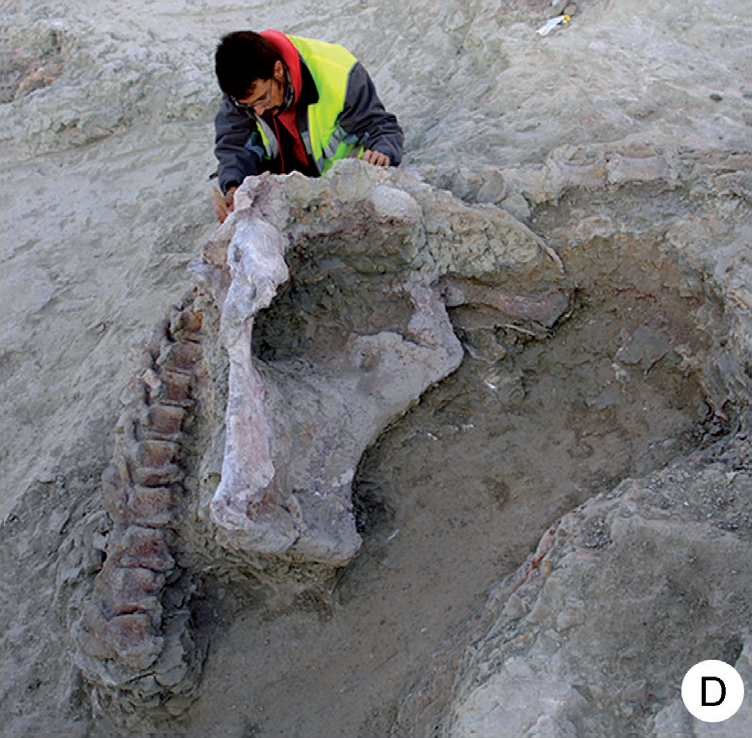
Excavation of the dorsal and caudal vertebrae and pelvis of Qunkasaura

The holotype specimen of Qunkasaura is a partial skeleton belonging to a single individual. It is part of a bonebed discovered in 2007, which includes the associated skeletons of multiple titanosaur taxa, as well as other dinosaurs, eusuchians, and many other animals.

It was described as a new genus and species of titanosaur in 2024. The generic name, Qunkasaura, combines the name of Qunca or Kunka, a Spanish city that gave rise to the village of Fuentes in Cuenca, Castilla-La Mancha, Spain, where the Lo Hueco site is located, with the Greek word saura, meaning "lizard"; it also refers to Antonio Saura, a twentieth-century painter from Cuenca. The specific name, pintiquiniestra, refers to Queen Pintiquiniestra, a character from the novel Don Quixote by Miguel de Cervantes.

== Classification ==
In their phylogenetic analysis, Mocho et al. recovered Qunkasaura as the sister taxon to Abditosaurus within the saltasaurid subfamily Opisthocoelicaudiinae. Their analyses also found lirainosaurines to be close relatives of saltsaurids, leading Mocho et al. to name the clade Lohuecosauria to contain the two. A cladogram adapted from their analysis is shown below:

- Saltasauroidea
  - - Rapetosaurus
    - Overosaurus
  - Lohuecosauria
    - Lirainosaurinae
    - - Isisaurus
      - Saltasauridae
        - Saltasaurinae
        - Opisthocoelicaudiinae
          - Alamosaurus
          - - Opisthocoelicaudia
            - - Abditosaurus
              - Qunkasaura
