= Calcaire de Rognac =

Geologic formation in France

Calcaire de Cognac
- Stratigraphic range: Maastrichtian, 70–66 Ma
- Type: Geological formation
- Overlies: Argiles et Grès à Reptiles Formation
- Thickness: Over 40 m (130 ft)

Lithology
- Primary: Clay, shale
- Other: Sandstone

Location
- Coordinates: 43.5°N 5.5°E
- Approximate paleocoordinates: 36.1°N 4.0°E
- Region: Provence-Alpes-Cote d'Azur, Bouches-du-Rhône
- Country: France
- Extent: Aix-en-Provence Basin
- Calcaire de Rognac (France)

The Calcaire de Rognac is a geologic formation in France. It preserves fossils dating back to the Maastrichtian stage of the Late Cretaceous period and possibly also sometime during the Tertiary period. It is overlain by the Argiles et Grès à Reptiles Formation.

== See also ==
- List of fossiliferous stratigraphic units in France
