= Dinosauria (museum) =

Museum in Espéraza, Aude, France

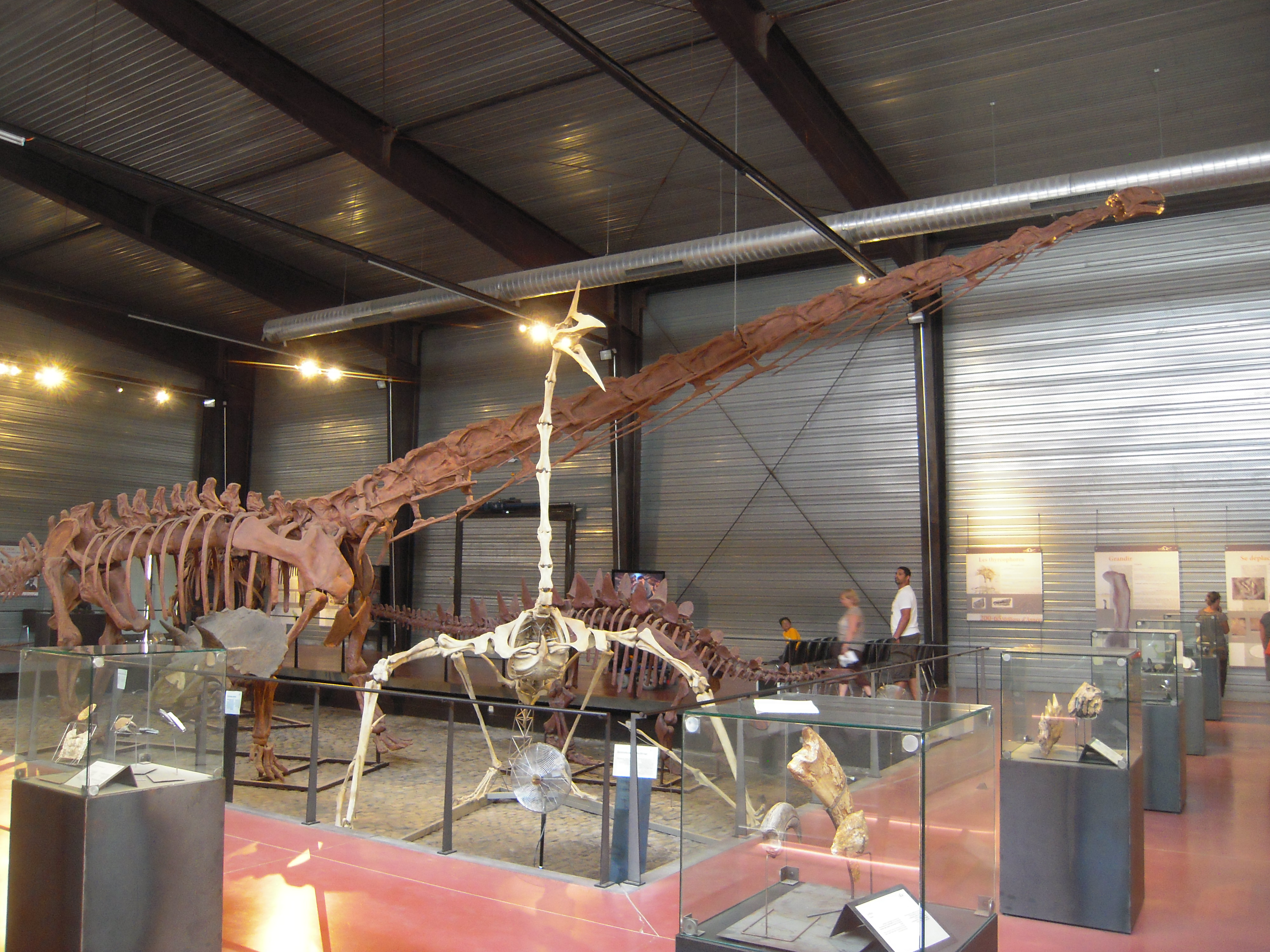
- Location: Espéraza, France
- Visitors: 32,799 (2017)
- Website: Official website

Dinosauria is a museum devoted to dinosaurs in Espéraza, Aude, a département of southern France.

Opened in 1992, it is directed by the association which created it, which is also named Dinosauria. The museum exhibits at least 35 different species of dinosaurs, mounted skeletons or life-size models. It also shows documentary films to the public. The museum collections and rooms include skeletons, paleontological workshops and some other elements. In 2007, the museum received the complete skeleton of an Ampelosaurus atacis specimen, found six years earlier (2001) during excavations in Bellevue (Bèlavista in Occitan), in the town of Campagne-sur-Aude (Campanha d'Aude in Occitan). This skeleton is the most complete dinosaur skeleton of its size ever found in France, and is nicknamed Eva, after the student Eva Morvan, who first discovered it during the 2000/2001 excavations.

== Some of the museum specimens ==
- Ampelosaurus atacis (12 meters long complete skeleton)
- Camarasaurus (skull)
- Dunkleosteus terrelli (1.1 meters long skull of a giant fish)
- Mamenchisaurus (22 meters long complete skeleton)
- Mixopterus (eurypterid, a kind of gigantic sea scorpion)
- Oviraptor philoceratops (skull)
- Psittacosaurus (complete skeleton)
- Psittacosaurus (life size model)
- Quetzalcoatlus (12 meters wingspan complete skeleton; not a dinosaur, rather a pterosaur)
- Stenopterygius, (complete skeleton, an ichthyosaur rather than a dinosaur)
- Struthiosaurus (complete skeleton)
- Tarascosaurus salluvicus (life size model)
- Triceratops (skull)
- Tsintaosaurus spinorhinus (complete skeleton)
- Tuojiangosaurus multispinus (complete skeleton)
- Tyrannosaurus rex (11 meters long complete skeleton)
- Variraptor mechinorum (feathered life size model)
