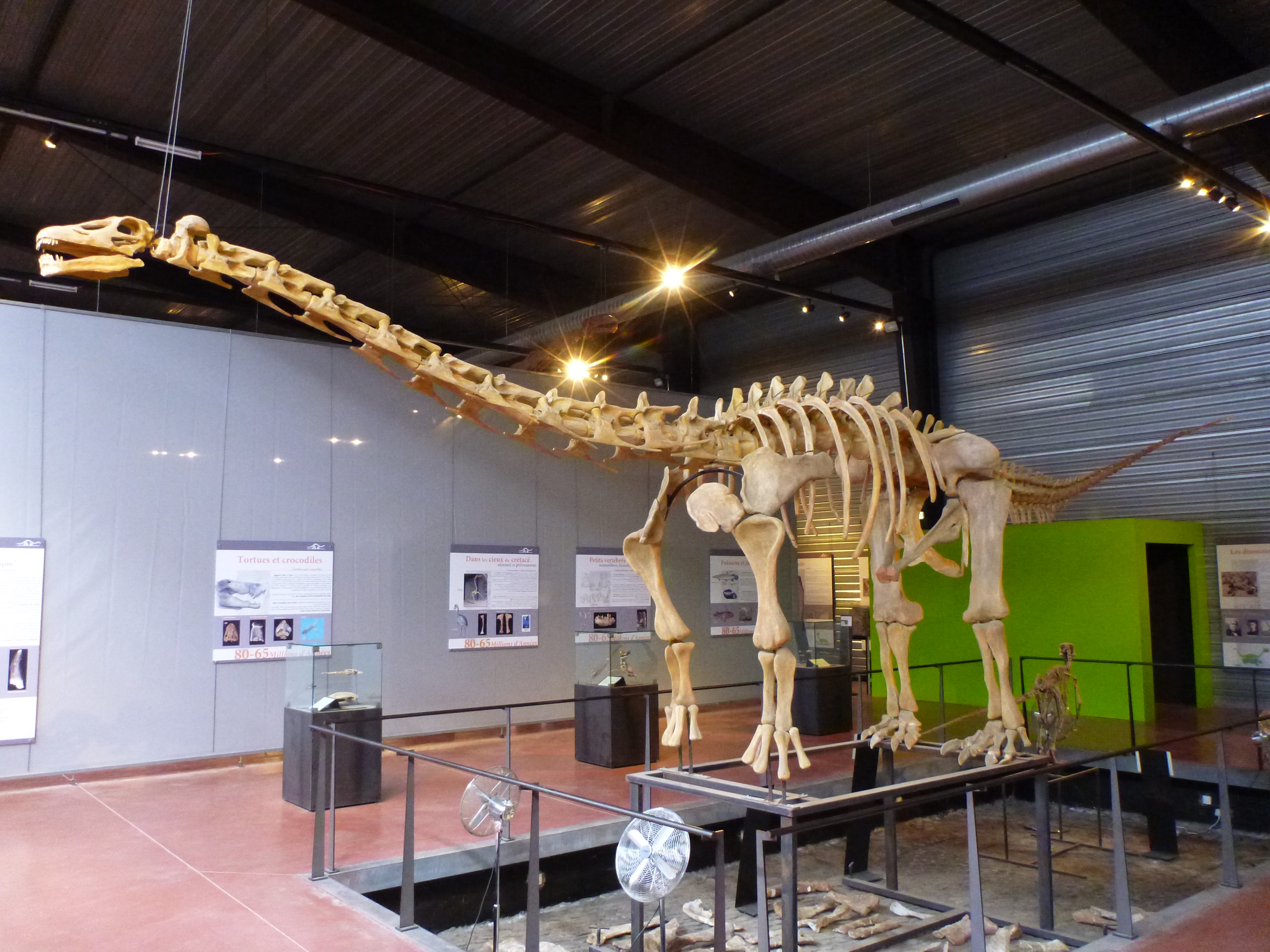
- Skeletal mount of Ampelosaurus atacis

Scientific classification
- Kingdom: Animalia
- Phylum: Chordata
- Class: Reptilia
- Clade: Dinosauria
- Clade: Saurischia
- Clade: †Sauropodomorpha
- Clade: †Sauropoda
- Clade: †Macronaria
- Clade: †Titanosauria
- Clade: †Lithostrotia
- Subfamily: †Lirainosaurinae; Díez Díaz et al. 2018

Genera
- †Ampelosaurus; †Atsinganosaurus; †Garrigatitan; †Lirainosaurus; †Lohuecotitan; †Paludititan?

= Lirainosaurinae =

Lirainosaurines Temporal range: Late Campanian-Early Maastrichtian, 74–66 Ma

Extinct subfamily of dinosaurs

Lirainosaurinae is a subfamily of lithostrotian titanosaur sauropods from the Late Cretaceous of France, Spain, and Romania.

== Systematics ==
Lirainosaurinae was defined by Díez Díaz et al. (2018) as comprising "Lirainosaurus, Ampelosaurus, their common ancestor, and all of its descendants", and includes the two definitional taxa as well as Atsinganosaurus, Lohuecotitan, and Paludititan. The five genera are known from Europe and all within the timespan of the late Campanian (Lirainosaurus) to early Maastrichtian (Ampelosaurus and Atsinganosaurus). Lirainosaurinae was recovered by Diez et al. (2018) as phylogenetically intermediate between the clades traditionally considered Saltasauridae and a clade containing taxa normally found in Aeolosaurini and Lognkosauria. Unpublished cladistic results by Mocho et al. (2019) recover Lohuecotitan and Paludititan as members of Lirainosaurinae, and place Lirainosaurinae as an early-diverging branch of Saltasauridae.

- Lithostrotia
  - Malawisaurus
  - - - Paludititan
      - Lohuecotitan
    - - Epachthosaurus
      - - - Opisthocoelicaudiinae
            - Alamosaurus
            - Opisthocoelicaudia
        - - - Saltasaurinae
              - Neuquensaurus
              - - Rocasaurus
                - Saltasaurus
          - - - Lirainosaurinae
                - Lirainosaurus
                - - Atsinganosaurus
                  - Ampelosaurus
            - - Bonatitan
              - - - Rapetosaurus
                  - Nemegtosaurus
                - - Aeolosaurinae
                    - Gondwanatitan
                    - Aeolosaurus
                  - Rinconsauria
                    - Rinconsaurus
                    - - Muyelensaurus
                      - - Bonitasaura
                        - Lognkosauria
                          - Mendozasaurus
                          - Futalognkosaurus
