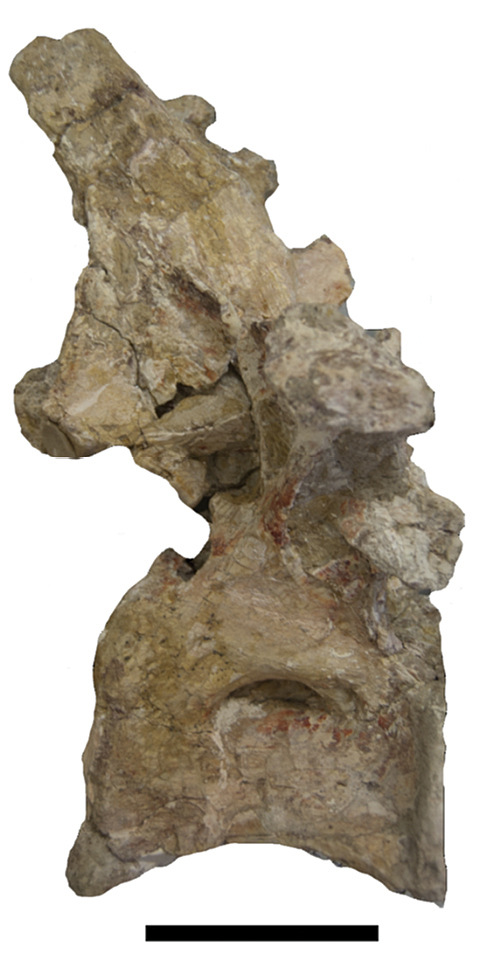
- Vertebra from the holotype

Scientific classification
- Domain: Eukaryota
- Kingdom: Animalia
- Phylum: Chordata
- Clade: Dinosauria
- Clade: Saurischia
- Clade: †Sauropodomorpha
- Clade: †Sauropoda
- Clade: †Macronaria
- Clade: †Titanosauria
- Clade: †Lithostrotia
- Subfamily: †Lirainosaurinae
- Genus: †Atsinganosaurus; Garcia et al., 2010
- Species: †A. velauciensis

Binomial name
- †Atsinganosaurus velauciensis Garcia et al., 2010

= Atsinganosaurus =

Atsinganosaurus Temporal range: Late Cretaceous, 72–70 Ma

Extinct genus of dinosaurs

Atsinganosaurus is a genus of titanosaurian sauropod dinosaur which existed in what is now France during the Late Cretaceous. Well-preserved remains (and the only known) of Atsinganosaurus were collected from the Grès à Reptiles Formation of the Aix-en-Provence Basin. The type and only species is A. velauciensis.

== Discovery and naming ==
Between 2009 and 2010, excavations were carried out at the Grès à Reptiles Formation at Velaux-La Bastide Neuve by the Palaios Association and the University of Poitiers. During the excavations, the holotype of Atsinganosaurus, VBN.93.01.a-d, a set of four posterior dorsal vertebrae, was discovered along with the remains of Garrigatitan, another titanosaurian. Atsinganosaurus was first described by Géraldine Garcia, Sauveur Amico, Francois Fournier, Eudes Thouand and Xavier Valentin in 2010, and the type species is A. velauciensis. The holotype now resides in the collection of the University of Poitiers.

More specimens, including an occipital condyle (MMS/VBN.09.41), a right portion of the braincase (MMS/VBN.09.167) and a probable left pterygoid (MMS/VBN.09.158a), were described by Díez Díaz et al. (2018), and a few parts of the skull, several teeth, vertebrae from each section of the vertebral column, ribs, chevrons, shoulder and pelvic girdle elements, most of the bones of the arm, and most of the bones of the leg are also known from multiple individuals, including VBN.93.MHNA.99.21.

== Etymology ==
The generic name is derived from the Greek word "τσιγγάνος" or "αθίγγανος", both meaning "gypsy", which refers to the possible migration from east to west of the species. The specific name is named after its finding place, Velaux - La Bastide Neuve.

== Classification ==
A 2018 cladistic analysis of Titanosauria places Ampelosaurus, Atsinganosaurus, and Lirainosaurus in the new lithostrotian clade Lirainosaurinae. Díez Díaz et al. (2018) suggested that adults reached 8–12 metres (26–39 ft) long, possibly up to 14 metres (46 ft) long for the largest individuals, and a body mass of 3.5–5 metric tons (3.9–5.5 short tons), while Díez Díaz et al. (2021) reportedly corrected the estimates to 5.38–8.95 metres (17.7–29.4 ft) and 2.46–5.26 metric tons (2.71–5.80 short tons).
