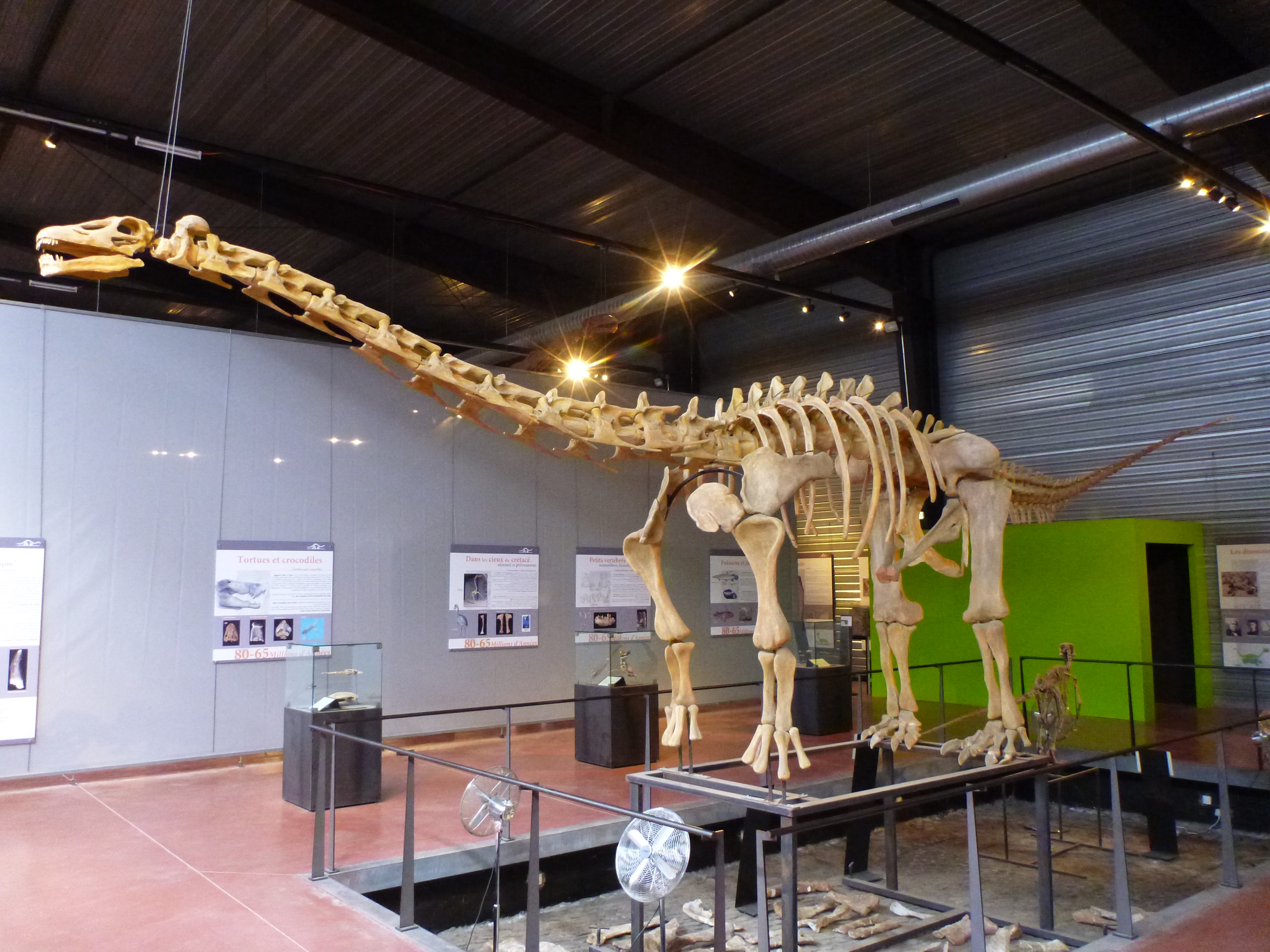
- Skeleton restoration of Ampelosaurus atacis

Scientific classification
- Kingdom: Animalia
- Phylum: Chordata
- Class: Reptilia
- Clade: Dinosauria
- Clade: Saurischia
- Clade: †Sauropodomorpha
- Clade: †Sauropoda
- Clade: †Eusauropoda
- Clade: †Macronaria
- Clade: †Titanosauria
- Clade: †Lithostrotia
- Subfamily: †Lirainosaurinae
- Genus: †Ampelosaurus; Le Loeuff, 1995

Type species
- †Ampelosaurus atacis Le Loeuff, 1995

= Ampelosaurus =

Ampelosaurus Temporal range: Late Cretaceous, (Early Maastrichtian) 71.5 Ma

Extinct genus of dinosaurs

Ampelosaurus (/ˌæmpɪloʊˈsɔːrəs/ AM-pi-loh-SOR-əs; meaning "vine lizard") is a titanosaurian sauropod dinosaur from the Late Cretaceous Period of what is now France. Its type species is A. atacis, named by Le Loeuff in 1995. Its remains were found in a level dating from 71.5 million years ago, representing the early Maastrichtian.

Ampelosaurus would have had a long neck and tail — like most sauropods — but it also carried armor in the form of osteoderms. In 2005, over 500 bones had been assigned to Ampelosaurus. Additional material has been found since, including a partially articulated skeleton with skull, which makes it one of the best known dinosaurs in France. However, recent studies suggest that the type locality is not a monospecific titanosaur bone bed and that part of the bones attributed to Ampelosaurus probably belong to a second titanosaurian taxon.

Ampelosaurus lived on what was the Ibero-Armorican Island, a landmass including much of present-day France and Iberian Peninsula. Histological studies show characteristics related to an island environment such as a slowed growth rate. However, with a size of about 14 m (46 ft) in length for the largest known individual, Ampelosaurus was not an insular dwarf unlike some other Ibero-Armorican titanosaurs like Lirainosaurus and Atsinganosaurus, or the genus Magyarosaurus from the Hateg island.

Several specimens found elsewhere in France and Spain were referred to Ampelosaurus but were later identified as belonging to other titanosaurs.

== Discovery and naming ==
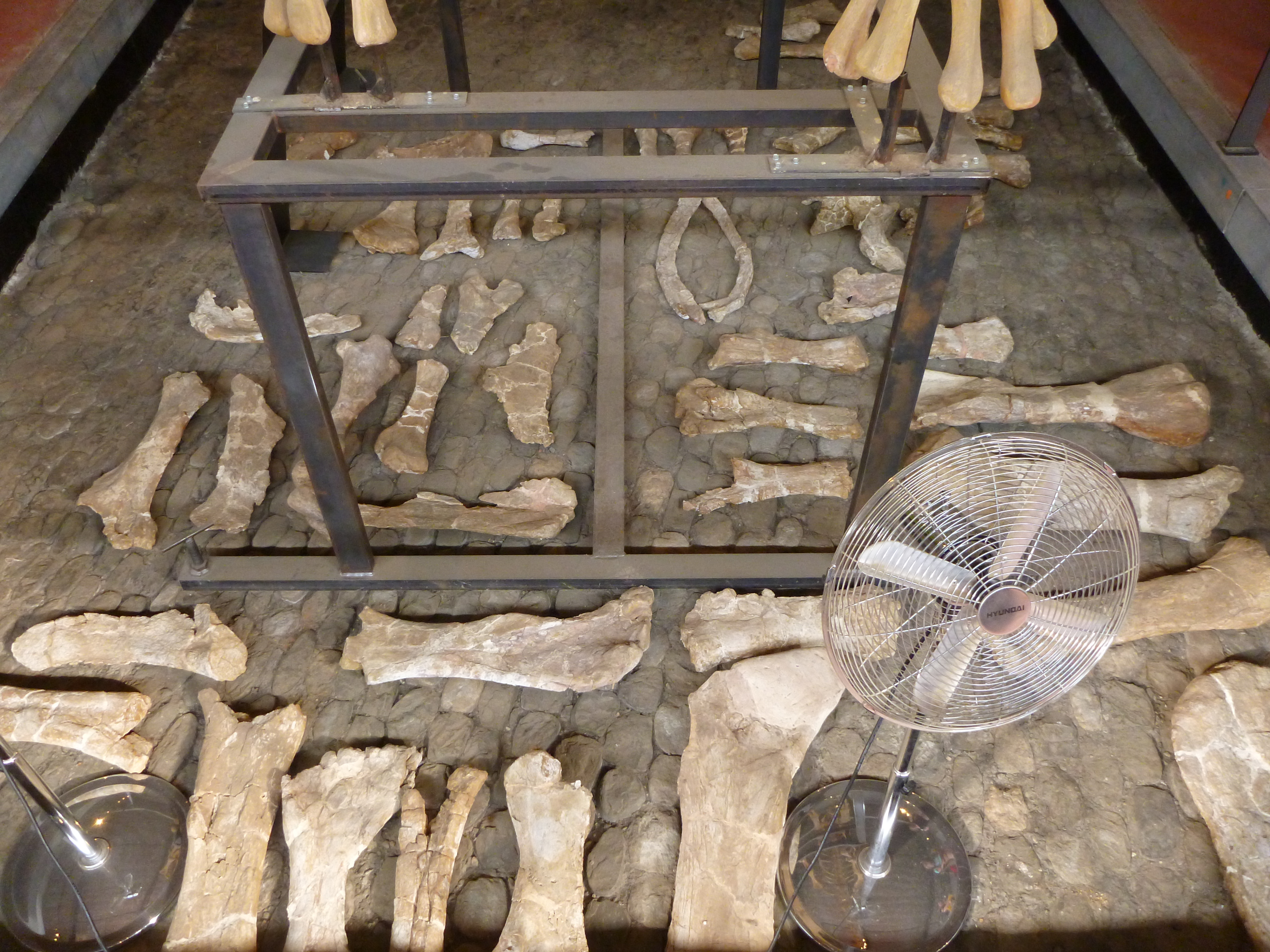
Assortment of bones, Musée des dinosaures, France

Ampelosaurus is known by abundant remains from the Bellevue site near the village of Campagne-sur-Aude in the Upper Aude Valley, in Aude department in Occitania region. It was recovered in the lower levels of the Marnes Rouges Inférieures Formation, which belong to the early Maastrichtian epoch of the Late Cretaceous Period, ~ 70 million years ago. These sediments represent an ancient floodplain with numerous river channels.

Historically, the dinosaurs of the Upper Aude Valley were first reported by Paul Gervais in 1877 from two vertebrae discovered in the commune of Fa. The first discoveries of dinosaur bones at Campagne-sur-Aude date back to the beginning of the twentieth century, but they remained isolated and were quickly forgotten. It was not until 1982 that dinosaur's localities of the Upper Aude Valley were rediscovered by local amateurs, Pierre Clottes and Christian Raynaud, following the accidental discovery of a fossil bone in Campagne-sur-Aude by a hunter a year earlier. Clottes and Raynaud mainly discovered caudal vertebrae and limb bones during simple surface collecting carried out at several sites around the villages of Campagne-sur-Aude and Espéraza.

In 1989, the first systematic excavations carried out by professional paleontologists began on the main site, located at the Bellevue farm. Several excavation campaigns brought to light numerous bones of an unknown sauropod. This new dinosaur was named Ampelosaurus atacis by the French paleontologist Jean Le Loeuff in a preliminary description published in 1995. Ampelosaurus is derived from the Greek αμπελος, "the vine" and the Latinised Greek saurus, "reptile". Therefore, Ampelosaurus means "vineyard lizard" after the Blanquette de Limoux vineyard. The vineyard is located on the south side of the region Ampelosaurus was found in. The specific name is based on the Latin atax, the "Aude river". Only one tooth, three articulated dorsal vertebrae (the holotype MDE-C3-247), and the neural spine of another dorsal vertebra were illustrated, whereas the material known at that time also included other dorsal and caudal vertebrae, ribs, chevrons, limb bones, shoulder and pelvis bones, from several individuals. Four osteoderms discovered at Bellevue and described in 1994 were also attributed to Ampelosaurus in 1995.

In 2005, Le Loeuff published a more complete description of the bones discovered since 1989 including a braincase and a right dentary. In 2001 was found a relatively complete skeleton of a young adult about 10 m long, nicknamed "Eva" after the name of Eva Morvan the student who discovered the first elements. Several excavation campaigns were necessary (until 2006) to extract this skeleton. This specimen, which has yet to be described, includes an almost complete disarticulated skull of which only a few elements are currently on display in the Dinosaur Museum of Espéraza. In 2007, the remains of a larger specimen were discovered, including a sternal plate, a scapula, a 1.20 m femur, a pubis, a caudal vertebra and a chevron.

For more than twenty years, Ampelosaurus atacis was considered the only titanosaur present at Bellevue. Observed differences in long bones proportions have been interpreted as examples of individual variations. However, in 2012, a morphometric study of titanosaur femurs from France and Spain suggested the presence of three morphotypes at Bellevue, one of which was tentatively assigned to the genus Lirainosaurus. In 2013 Veronica Díez Díaz et al., however, noted that these femora differed from L. astibiae in several features.

In 2021, Díez Díaz and colleagues also agree on the existence at this site of a second titanosaur but find it more similar to the genus Garrigatitan from the Upper Campanian of Provence. The recognition of the presence of a second species of titanosaur at Bellevue in addition to Ampelosaurus atacis creates a high level of uncertainty in the attribution to one or the other of these species of isolated remains found at this site. Díez Díaz et al. thus underline the need to revise all the titanosaur bones found at Bellevue to clarify their taxonomy.

In 2023, at the Annual Conference of the European Association of Vertebrate Palaeontologists, Bernat Vila and colleagues presented preliminary results of a comprehensive study of the abundant titanosaur remains from Bellevue which confirms the presence at this locality of a new titanosaur species whose description is in progress. This study will also lead to an emended diagnosis of Ampelosaurus.

=== Purported Ampelosaurus remains from other localities ===
The presence of Ampelosaurus has also been reported in other parts of southern France, as well as in Spain, but their identification has so far been shown to be erroneous (or has not been demonstrated in the case of the Labarre sandstone formation). In a short note published in 1998, Jean Le Loeuff stated that Ampelosaurus was known not only from the upper Aude Valley, but also the Petites Pyrénées (Ariège department), and the Chaînon de Saint-Chinian (Hérault department). However this has never been confirmed by a publication. Previously, Le Loeuff had recognized the presence of two different titanosaurs in the Grès de Labarre formation (Ariège) based on two different types of caudal centra and two very different tibiae. But he then considered that, given the fragmentary nature of the material, the specimens should be considered indeterminate titanosaurs. In the same way, in 1999 Eric Buffetaut and colleagues attributed to Ampelosaurus atacis teeth and postcranial bones discovered in the Grès à Reptiles formation at Cruzy (located in the area called Chaînon de Saint-Chinian) in Hérault department. A later study showed that Cruzy's titanosaur teeth are different from those of Ampelosaurus, and belong to a new taxon whose description is in progress. In 2009, Fernando Barroso-Barcenilla and colleagues reported in the Spanish site of Lo Hueco, in Cuenca province, the discovery of spatulate teeth with the same morphology as those of Ampelosaurus. However, the detailed description of the titanosaur teeth from Lo Hueco refuted this interpretation. In 2013, Fabien Knoll and colleagues tentatively attributed to Ampelosaurus sp. a braincase also from the Lo Hueco site. In 2019, Knoll and colleagues finally referred this braincase to Lohuecotitan pandafilandi, which was described in 2016 from a postcranial skeleton. Two types of titanosaur braincase are present in Lo Hueco. This attribution to the genus Lohuecotitan is based on the fact that the other braincase morphotype was found to be associated with a titanosaur skeleton distinct from Lohuecotitan, and because none of the very abundant titanosaur postcranial remains of Lo Hueco (represented by more than twenty partially articulated skeletons) belong to Ampelosaurus.

== Description ==
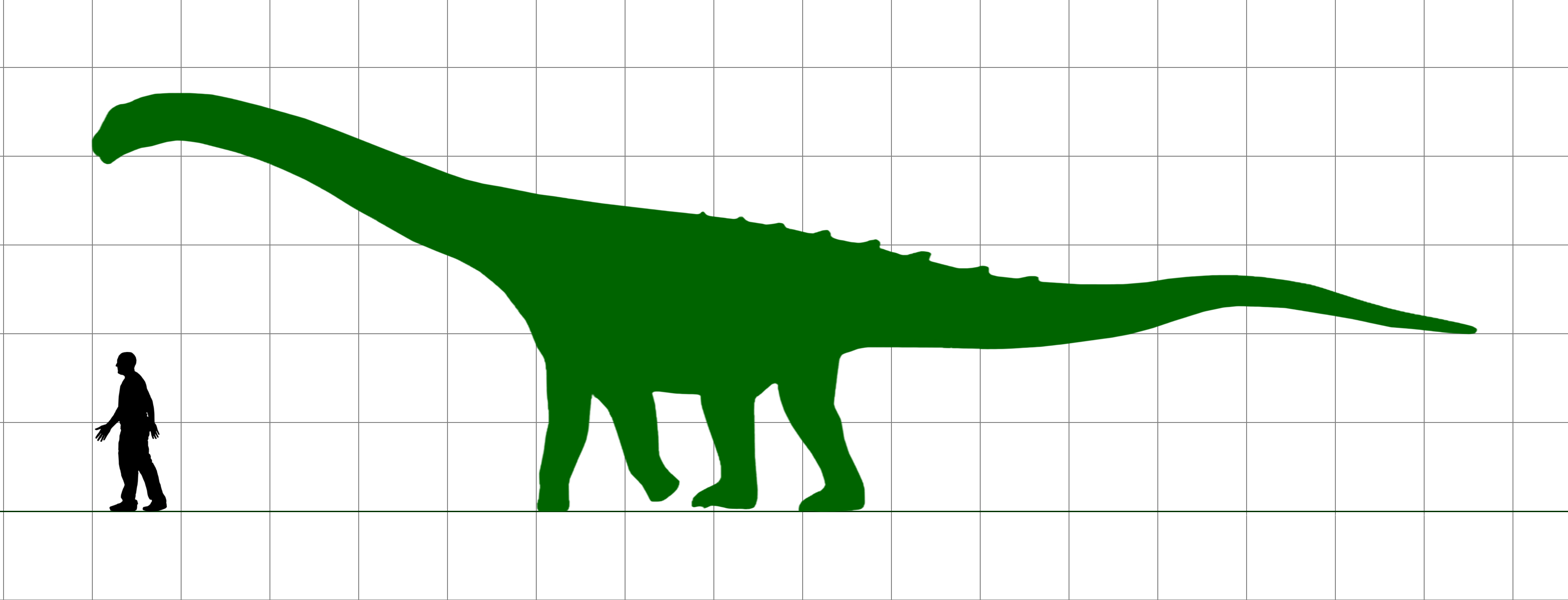
Size compared to a human

Like most sauropods, Ampelosaurus would have had a long neck and tail, but it also carried armor in the form of osteoderms 25 to 28 cm long. The four osteoderms found have three different morphologies, they are plate, bulb, and spine-shaped. Ampelosaurus is thought to have measured 15–16 m (49–52 ft) in length and about 8 metric tons (8.8 short tons) in body mass. In 2022, Vila and colleagues assign a size of 13.9 m (46 ft) long and a weight of 9.98 metric tons (11.00 short tons) for the largest individual based on the femur MDE-C3-174 (Vila et al. Supplementary Information). Ampelosaurus atacis is known from many unattached bones and teeth. It is one of the best-known dinosaurs from France. It is considered to be a dwarf sauropod by Coria et al. (2005) because it has a smaller size in comparison with its ancestors. However, according to Klein et al. (2012), Ampelosaurus is not an insular dwarf since its adult size is much greater than that of Europasaurus or Magyarosaurus.

=== Skeleton ===
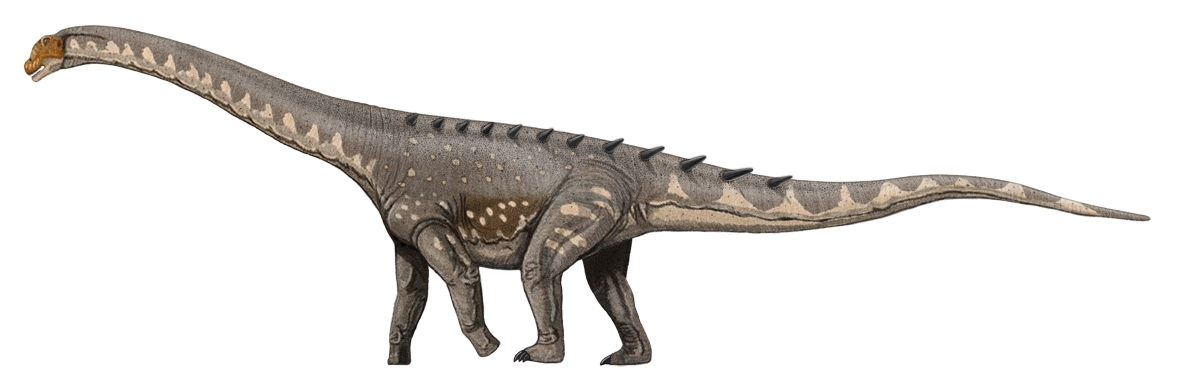
Life restoration, with hypothetical osteoderm covering

Ampelosaurus is one of the most completely known titanosaurian sauropods from Europe. Since 1989, over 500 bones discovered at the Upper Cretaceous Bellevue locality of southern France have been assigned to A. atacis. In 2023 Vila and colleagues increased this number to 1400 dinosaur bones known at Bellevue, the majority belonging to titanosaurs, likely including at least two species. An abundant amount of well-preserved elements have been uncovered at Bellevue. In the original description, only a tooth and some vertebrae were examined. In 2005, a complete description was made by Le Loeuff of all known material, allowing Ampelosaurus to be much better understood. In 2001 a partially articulated skeleton was found, including a disarticulated skull. This specimen, nicknamed "Eva", has not yet been described. All the material has been assigned to A. atacis, the observed differences in the proportions of limb bones being at the time interpreted by Le Loeuff as related to individual variation. In 2023 however, examination of the material by Vila et al. revealed that many of the bones assigned to Ampelosaurus belong to a distinct titanosaur making it uncertain the assignment of isolated bones to either of these two species. This study will lead to the erection of a new titanosaur species and to emended the diagnosis of Ampelosaurus. The description of Ampelosaurus below is provisional since some specimens referred to it may belong to another species.

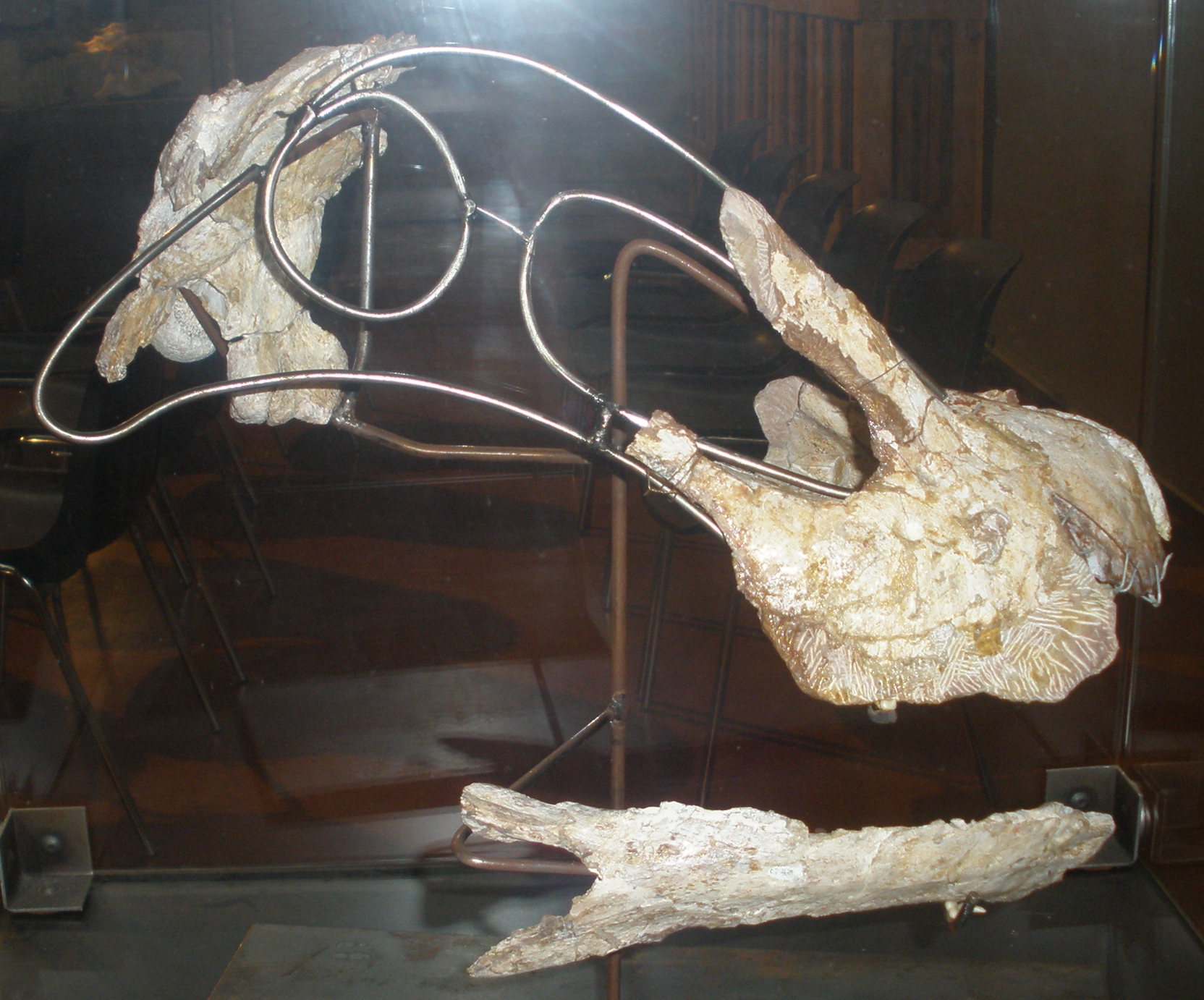
Some of the skull bones of the specimen nicknamed "Eva" on display at the Musée des dinosaures, Espéraza

A. atacis is known from a few, well-preserved teeth and some cranial material, a tooth of which was described in its original description. The teeth differentiate Ampelosaurus from Magyarosaurus and Lirainosaurus, both of which are also from Europe. The teeth are different from the two later genera as Ampelosaurus has teeth that are roughly cylindrical in the top with thin expansions at the bottom. They are 21 millimetres (0.83 in) high and about 6 millimetres (0.24 in) wide. Those expansions give its teeth a slight constriction between the root and the crown. The teeth are also quite different from the peg-like teeth of titanosaurids. The teeth, have a general morphology similar to titanosaurians Antarctosaurus and a braincase from Dongargaon. Another skull was described from southern France, but showed some differences, meaning there could have been at least two different titanosaurians in France during the Late Cretaceous.

The scapula was found attached to a coracoid. In the longer direction, the bone is 72 centimetres (28 in) long. The blade of the scapula, contrary to titanosaurs, is triangular, larger closer to the base. The blade narrows distally instead of showing an expansion. Differing from Magyarosaurus and Saltasaurus, the scapula does not have the dorsal crest at the base of the scapular blade. The shape of the coracoid is quadrangular, and the coracoid has a thickened cranial margin.

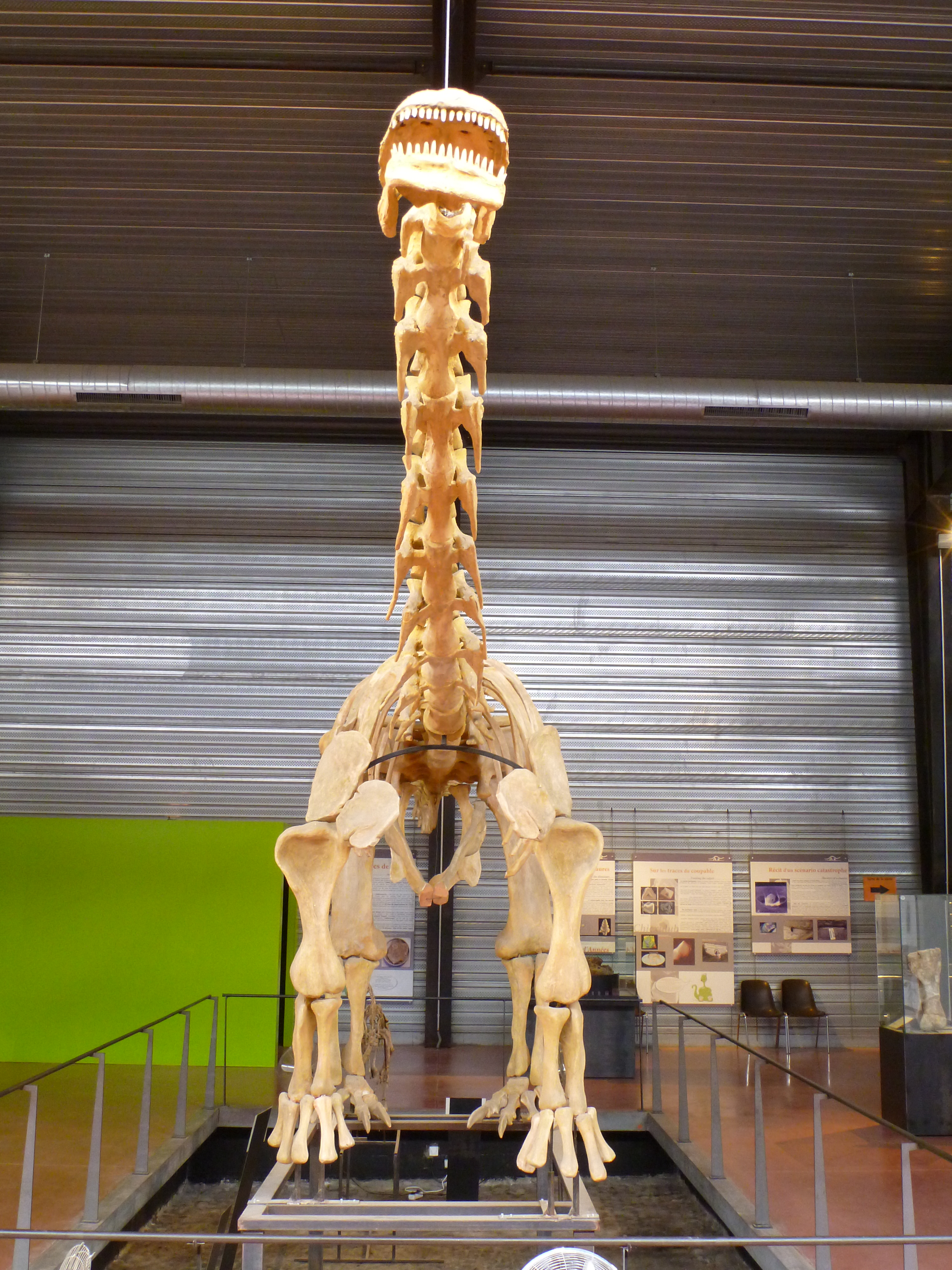
Mounted skeleton cast

Ampelosaurus is also known from a pubis, about 75 centimetres (30 in) long. It has a strong distal expansion, that is similar to a titanosaur from Brazil, and a large foramen. Contrary to the South American titanosaurs, the ilium does not have an expansion on the side. The ischium, known from a shaft, is unexpanded distally and very well developed. It is also very flat. An incomplete radius is also known. It lacks the proximal and distal ends, and possesses a very prominent ridge along it. The largest and best-preserved specimens are both ulnas. The right ulna has a total length of 395 millimetres (15.6 in). The right ulna is small and slender, is missing an olecranon, and has a well-marked ridge. The left ulna is larger, with a length of 725 millimetres (28.5 in). The ulna has a deep radial fossa.

About 27 femora are known from Bellevue, making them the most common bone, most of them more-or-less complete. They are very flat craniocaudally but otherwise, lack any unusual features. In a study of its bone physiology, it was found that the maximum known femur length was 1,100 millimetres (43 in), which is much larger than previously known (802 millimetres (31.6 in)). That means, that the ancestors Ampelosaurus were slightly smaller than itself. 18 humeri are also known, but none of them approach the size of the largest femur. The humeri do not have a free medullary cavity. The humeri are robust, about 63 centimetres (25 in) long, with very expanded distal and proximal ends.

Three different types of osteoderms have been recovered at Bellevue. Two with large spines have been uncovered. At the base of each spine, which is about 12 centimetres (4.7 in) tall, are two large foramina. The internal faces are all concavo-convex and have a ridge opposite the spine. In side view, they have two sections, a low half that progressively thickens, and a spine.

==== Vertebrae ====
The holotype specimen of A. atacis is a group of three connected dorsal vertebrae. Cervical vertebrae are uncommon from Bellevue and most of them are poorly preserved. The vertebrae are opisthocoelous, with centra that lengthen toward the rear. Neural spines have been preserved on the vertebrae, and they face toward the rear. Two dorsal vertebrae were preserved with a complete, but very crushed neural arch, a neural spine with a characteristic shape: it is very widened distally and narrows downwards. The vertebrae also have an internal structure that is spongy, with very large cells. The caudal vertebrae are all strongly procoelous and are compressed on the sides. The neural spines of the caudal vertebrae are very narrow and very tall and point toward the rear. The middle caudal vertebrae are more compressed on the sides that the others. Also, the centrum of middle caudal vertebrae is longer proportionally. Two sacral vertebrae were known from Bellevue. They are poorly preserved, and are thought to belong to a juvenile. A complete sacrum was also found in 2002.

=== Distinguishing anatomical features ===
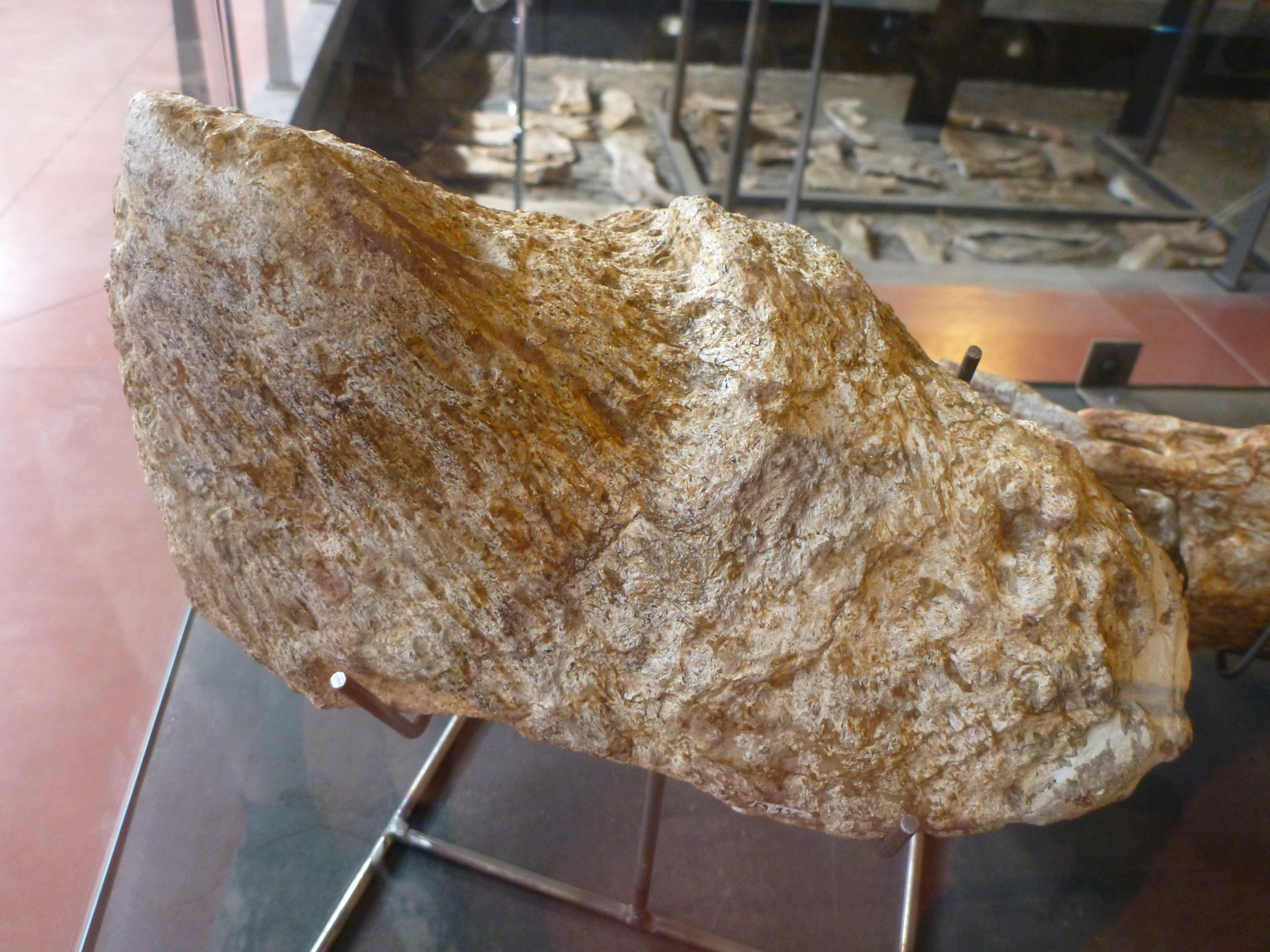
Osteoderm (MDE-C3-192)

This set of characters was identified by Le Loeuff in his description of Ampelosaurus to distinguish it from all other genera: teeth that weakly spatulate; a laterally widening distal extremity of neural spines on the dorsal vertebrae; neural arch of the dorsal vertebrae inclining strongly towards the rear; the lack of a distal expansion on the scapular blade; the presence of a light, ventral crest on top of the scapula; the presence of plate, bulb, and spine shaped osteoderms; and, in 2005, Le Loeuff added that the constriction of the neural spine on the dorsal and cervical vertebrae was also probably a characteristic of Ampelosaurus.

== Classification ==
Characteristics of the tail vertebrae and the presence of osteoderms indicate that Ampelosaurus belongs to Lithostrotia, a group of derived titanosaurians which also includes Alamosaurus and Saltasaurus. Many other paleontologists have classified Ampelosaurus as belonging to Titanosauria, Saltasauridae, and Titanosauridae. Ampelosaurus may have an uncertain classification, but it is clearly a titanosaur, with many features found in titanosaurs.

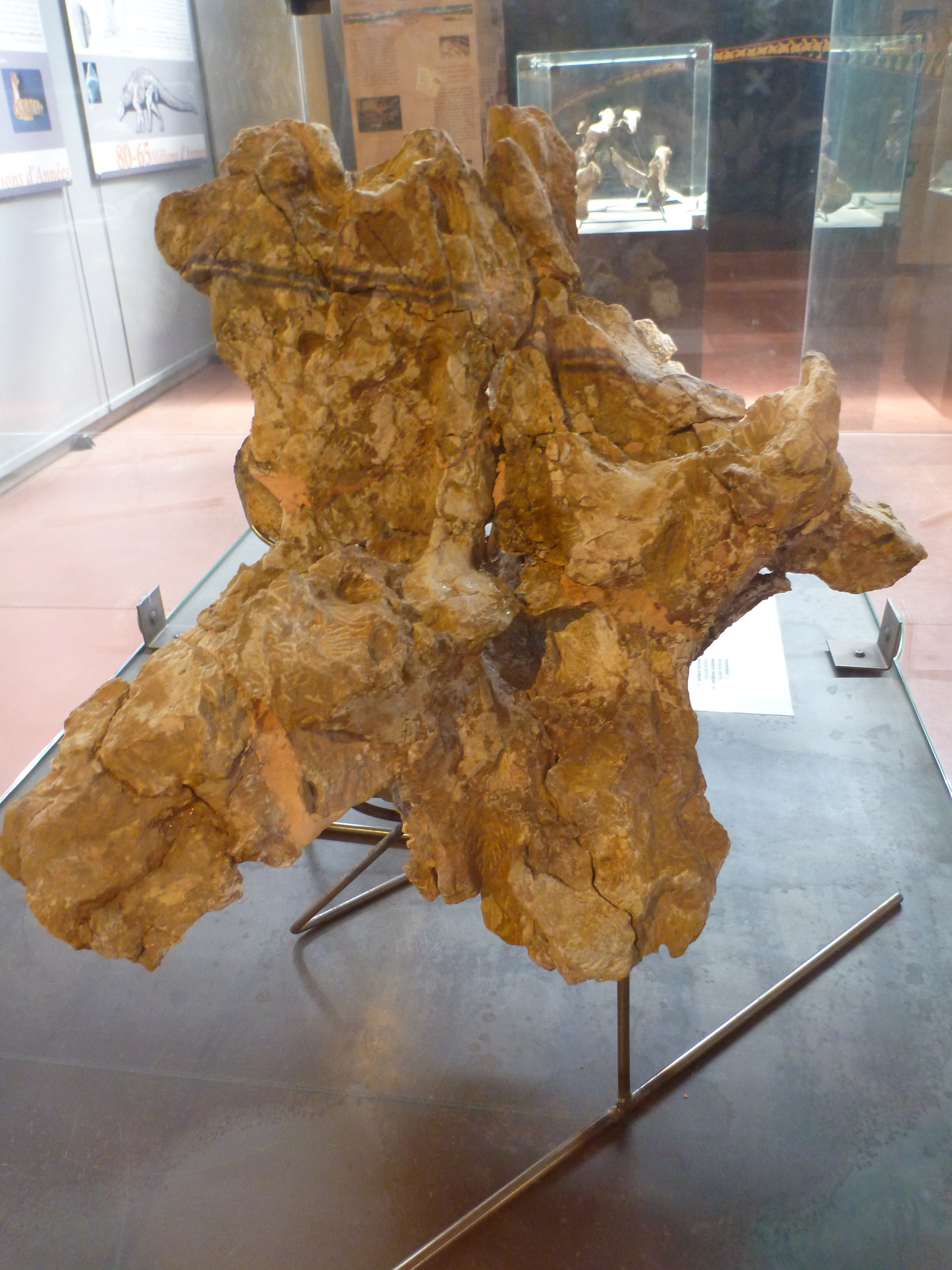
Posterior cervical vertebra (MDE-C3-265), Musée des dinosaures, France

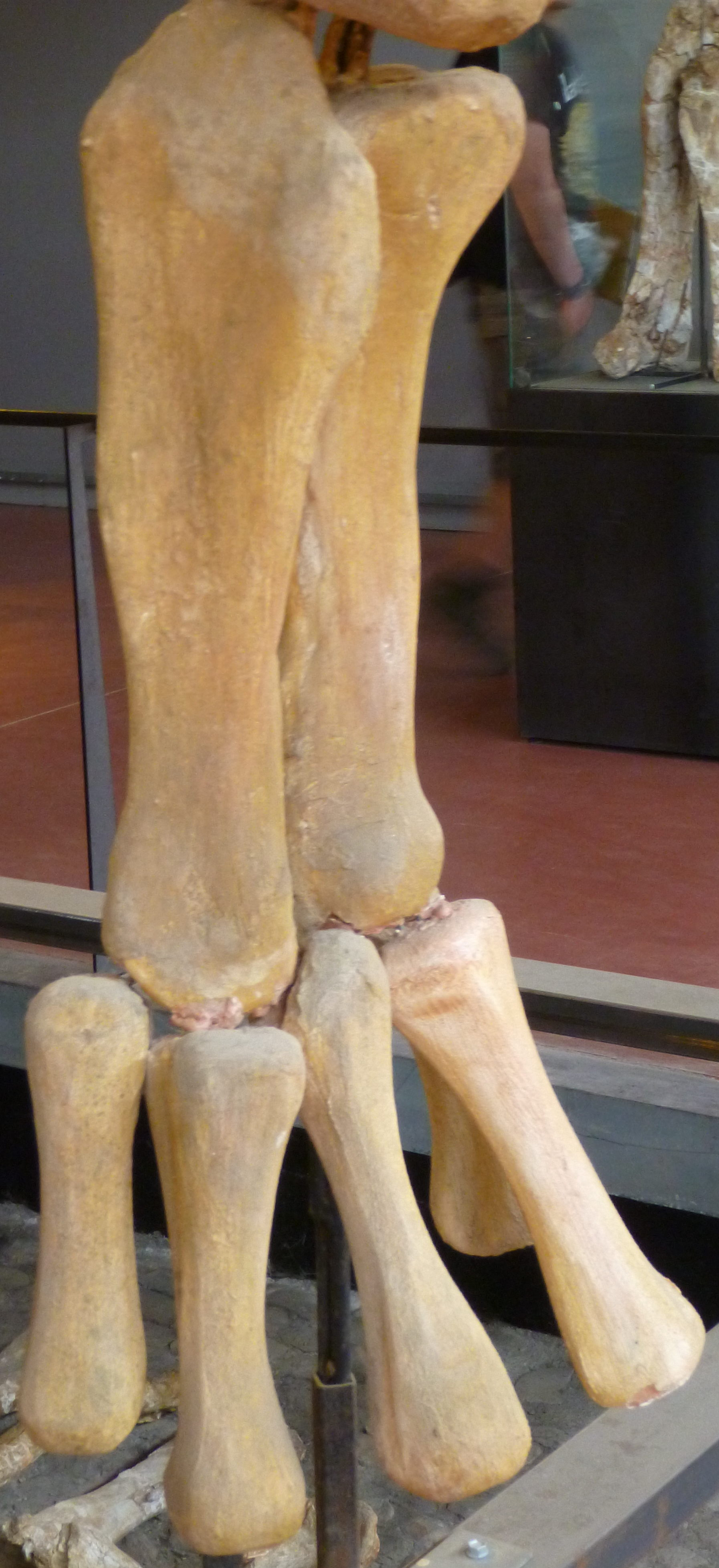
Reconstructed forearm and hand

More recently, Ampelosaurus has been put in a clade with other French and Spanish titanosaurs from the late Campanian to Maastrichtian, which was named Lirainosaurinae by Díez Díaz et al. in 2018. Ampelosaurus nested as sister taxon to Atsinganosaurus also from France, and the entire clade was placed in between the taxa commonly classified as Saltasauridae and taxa normally in either Aeolosaurini or Lognkosauria.

- Lithostrotia
  - Malawisaurus
  - - - Paludititan
      - Lohuecotitan
    - - Epachthosaurus
      - - - Opisthocoelicaudiinae
            - Alamosaurus
            - Opisthocoelicaudia
        - - - Saltasaurinae
              - Neuquensaurus
              - - Rocasaurus
                - Saltasaurus
          - - - Lirainosaurinae
                - Lirainosaurus
                - - Atsinganosaurus
                  - Ampelosaurus
            - - Bonatitan
              - - - Rapetosaurus
                  - Nemegtosaurus
                - - Aeolosaurinae
                    - Gondwanatitan
                    - Aeolosaurus
                  - Rinconsauria
                    - Rinconsaurus
                    - - Muyelensaurus
                      - - Bonitasaura
                        - Lognkosauria
                          - Mendozasaurus
                          - Futalognkosaurus

== Paleobiology ==
=== Growth ===
Ampelosaurus seems to have grown in a way similar to more basal sauropods. After a certain point in its development, the microscopic material of the bone became very different from more basal Sauropoda. Ampelosaurus grew more slowly once the bone microstructure became unique among sauropods. Although Diplodocoidea and basal Macronaria also show an increase in bone growth and a decrease in growth rate around the presumed onset of sexual maturity, it is much more gradual than Ampelosaurus. The process of growing, which in other sauropods started around sexual maturity, was clearly delayed in Ampelosaurus. The period of growth after sexual maturity seems to be shortened in Ampelosaurus and is dominated by slow bone building instead of fast growth. Growth marks are generally rare in sauropods or appearing only late in ontogeny, if at all. The lack of growth marks is suggestive of fast and continuous growth in sauropods, which supports the hypothesis that they achieved large body size through fast growth. Ampelosaurus does not show growth marks on any bone sample. This is unusual to be found with the apparently reduced growth rate and high level of bone growth seen in it, as those features are often associated with the occurrence of growth marks.

=== Histology ===
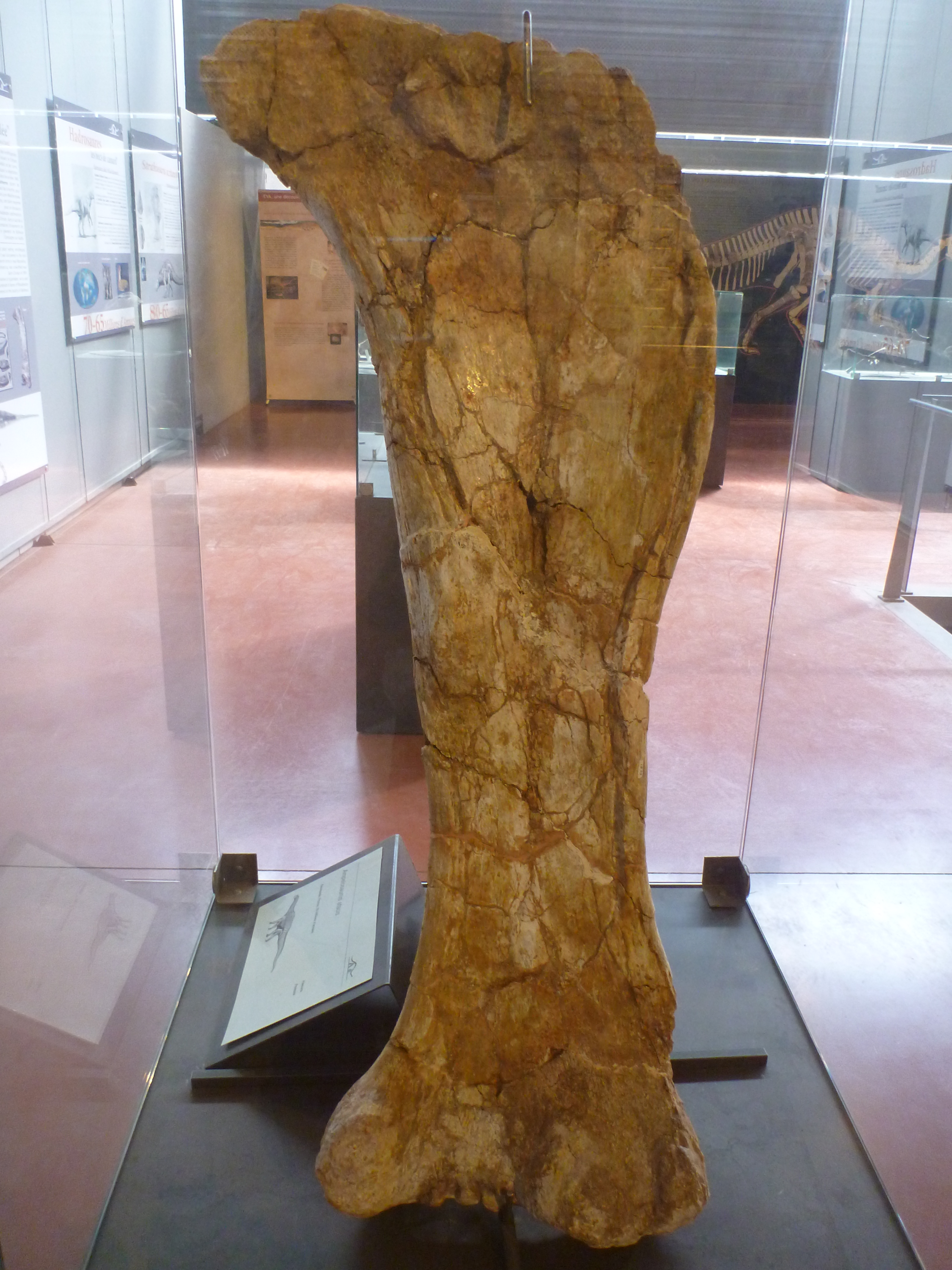
Fossil femur (MDE-C3-87) belonging to an individual whose size and weight are estimated at around 6.70 m long and 3.5 tons (Vila et al. 2022 Supplementary Information)

EFS, a system found on the surface of bones, is thought to show a growth plateau which indicates that maximum body size and skeletal maturity is reached in an individual. Ampelosaurus has not been known to have EFS, found on most non-titanosaurian sauropods. Magyarosaurus, a closely related titanosaur, Lirainosaurus, a titanosaur related to saltasaurids, Alamosaurus, a saltasaurid, and Phuwiangosaurus, a very basal titanosaur, were also found to have lacked EFS. However, the basal macronarian Europasaurus has been shown to have had EFS, so it was likely just titanosaurians that did not have them. The outer edge of the bones, were EFS would have been found, was well-preserved, and still lacked any fossilized proof of them being present for Ampelosaurus. However, in the PLoS ONE study that found the lack of EFS, the larger specimens were not tested, so Ampelosaurus might have had EFS. This is characteristic of titanosaurs, as diplodocoids and basal macronarians seem to have EFS. A majority of all Ampelosaurus specimens have been found with secondary osteons placed densely in the inner regions of bones, and lightly in outer regions. The osteon orientation found in Ampelosaurus of osteons not only facing across the bone is not typical of Neosauropoda. Also, there is no medullary cavity in any bones of Ampelosaurus. Ampelosaurus seems to have had many ontogenetic stages in its life based on its bone histology.

== Paleoecology ==
Ampelosaurus atacis is only known with certainty at the base of the Marnes de la Maurine Member of the Marnes Rouges Inférieures Formation in the Upper Aude Valley in southwestern France (Aude department). Ampelosaurus was also reported in other localities in France and Spain (notably Massecaps and Lo Hueco) but these specimens were found to belong to different titanosaurs. The age of the Marnes Rouges Inférieures Formation, which is divided in four members, extends from the late Campanian, 75 million years ago (for the Marnes Rouges de Campagne Member dated by palynology), to the end of the early Maastrichtian, 70 million years ago (for the Poudingue Fleuri Member). Magnetostratigraphic studies indicate an age of 71.5 million years (top of chron C32n.1n) for the localities of the basal part of the Marnes de la Maurine Member (including the Bellevue locality), which corresponds to the early Maastrichtian. At that time Europe was an archipelago made up of islands of varying sizes and changing geography over time. Ampelosaurus roamed the vast plains of the Ibero-Armorican Island, an emergent landmass made up of much of the present day France and Iberian Peninsula. The sediments of the Marnes Rouges Inférieures Formation consist of mudstones, sandstones, conglomerates, and siltstones, of fluvial and alluvial origin.

Fauna associated with Ampelosaurus atacis included another yet unnamed titanosaur, the ornithopod Rhabdodon priscus (represented by teeth, jaws, and postcranial bones), an indeterminate nodosaurid ankylosaur (known only by dermal scutes), an indeterminate Dromaeosauridae ( represented by teeth), the giant ground bird Gargantuavis philoinos, an undetermined pterosaur, the turtles Foxemys mechinorum (known by an incomplete skull and shell elements) and a new yet unnamed compsemydid (one skull and an isolated costal plate), an undescribed allodaposuchid eusuchian (represented by many elements including a complete skull showing similarities with Musturzabalsuchus and Allodaposuchus subjuniperus), and fisches (a lepisosteid and the coelacanth Axelrodichthys megadromos). Dinosaurs eggshells and nests are also present in the Marnes de la Maurine Member. They are represented by the oospecies Cairanoolithus roussetensis, C. dughii, and Megaloolithus siruguei in the lower part, M. siruguei and Montanoolithus labadousensis in the middle part, M. siruguei and M. mamillare in the upper part. Fusioolithus baghensis is recorded in the Poudingue Fleuri Member. Megaloolithus and Fusioolithus are titanosaur eggs. The oogenera Cairanoolithus and Montanoolithus are referred respectively to nodosaurids and dromaeosaurids. A few invertebrate and plant remains are also known. The macroflora, notably found at Bellevue, is represented by leaves of palm trees and cycads, as well as fragments of angiosperm wood from trees 10 to 15 m high.

=== Biogeography ===
Titanosaurians were a flourishing group of sauropod dinosaurs during Cretaceous times. Fossils of titanosaurians have been found on all continents and their remains are abundant in a number of Late Cretaceous sites. Titanosaurian sauropods were among the most common dinosaurs in the ibero-Armorican island during the Campanian-Maastrichtian times. In this island a shift in the dinosaur fauna known as the Maastrichtian Dinosaur Turnover is observed in which a late Campanian-early Maastrichtian pre-turnover dinosaur fauna was replaced by an early-late Maastrichtian post-turnover assemblage. Concerning the titanosaurs the pre-turnover assemblage included small-sized species such as Atsinganosaurus and Garrigatitan (latest-middle Campanian to early-late Campanian in age) from southeastern France (Bouches-du-Rhône department) and Lirainosaurus (latest Campanian in age, 72 to 73.5 Ma) from north-central Spain (Burgos province, Treviño enclave), and moderate-sized forms such as Lohuecotitan (late Campanian-early Maastrichtian) from central Spain (Cuenca province) and Ampelosaurus (early Maastrichtian 71.5 Ma) from southwestern France (Aude department). The post-turnover assemblage is dominated by larger forms such as Abditosaurus (mid-early Maastrichtian, 70.5 Ma) from northeastern Spain (Lleida province). The latter is closely related to Gondwanan titanosaurs and does not show reduced growth rate or reduced body size, two common traits found in pre-turnover titanosaurs assemblages. It belongs to a distinct immigrant clade of large titanosaurs that reached the Ibero–Armorican island during the early Maastrichtian, being a member of the post-turnover titanosaurian assemblage of this island. This dispersal event from the southern landmasses, probably Africa, took place probably during the called KMa2 regressive event (which occurred about 70.6 million years ago during the Lower Maastrichtian), a eustatic event that affected the central Tethyan margin and northern Africa.
