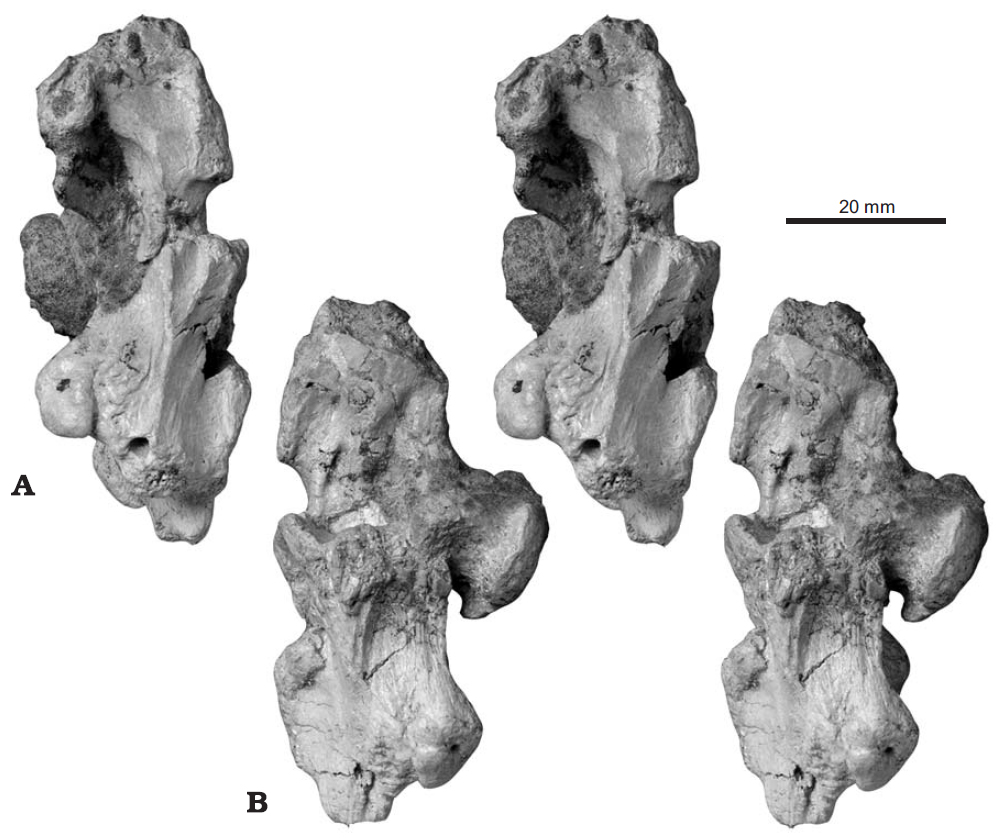
- Paratype braincase

Scientific classification
- Kingdom: Animalia
- Phylum: Chordata
- Clade: Dinosauria
- Clade: Saurischia
- Clade: †Sauropodomorpha
- Clade: †Sauropoda
- Clade: †Macronaria
- Clade: †Titanosauria
- Clade: †Lithostrotia
- Genus: †Lirainosaurus; Sanz et al., 1999
- Species: †L. astibiae

Binomial name
- †Lirainosaurus astibiae Sanz et al., 1999

= Lirainosaurus =

Lirainosaurus Temporal range: Late Cretaceous, 72–70 Ma

Extinct genus of reptiles

Lirainosaurus (meaning "slender lizard"; from the Basque lirain, meaning "slender", and the Greek sauros, meaning "lizard") is a genus of titanosaur sauropod which lived in what is now Spain. The type species, Lirainosaurus astibiae, was described by Sanz, Powell, Le Loeuff, Martinez, and Pereda-Suberbiola in 1999. It was a relatively small sauropod, measuring 4 metres (13 ft) long, possibly up to 6 metres (20 ft) long for the largest individuals, and weighed about 2–4 metric tons (2.2–4.4 short tons).

== Classification ==
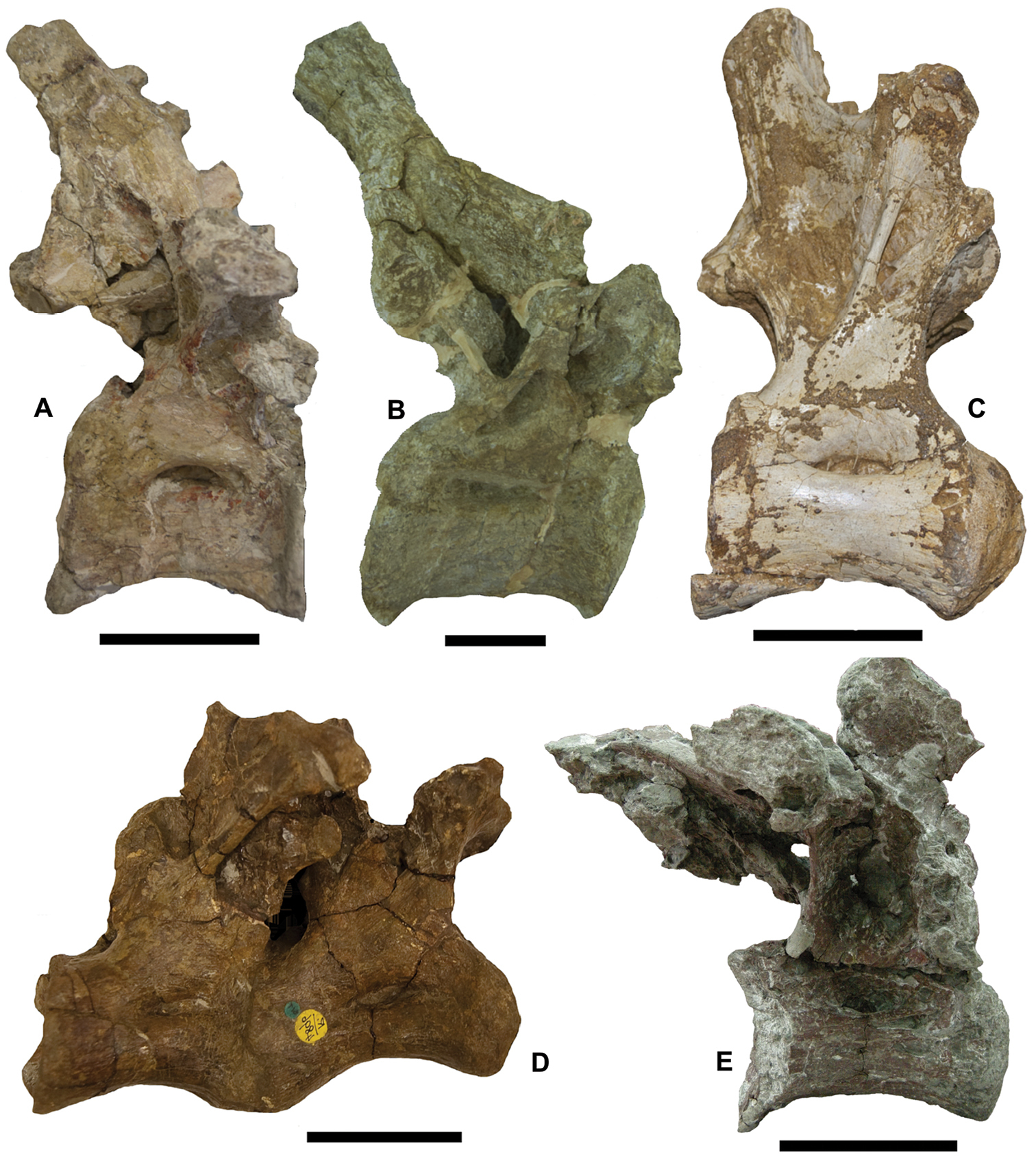
Dorsal vertebra of Lirainosaurus (C) compared to those of other European titanosaurs

This genus was based on a skull fragment, isolated teeth, several vertebrae including the holotype - an anterior caudal vertebra, and appendicular bones from the Late Cretaceous of Laño (northern Spain). New material from Laño, Spain described by Diaz et al. (2013), which includes cervical, dorsal and caudal vertebrae, dorsal ribs, and a haemal arch, has been assigned to Lirainosaurus.

=== Distinguishing anatomical features ===
A diagnosis is a statement of the anatomical features of an organism (or group) that collectively distinguish it from all other organisms. Some, but not all, of the features in a diagnosis are also autapomorphies. An autapomorphy is a distinctive anatomical feature that is unique to a given organism. According to Diaz et al., Lirainosaurus can be distinguished by the presence of a lamina in the interzygapophyseal fossa of the most proximal caudal vertebrae; and the spinopostzygapophyseal structure not posteriorly projected in the posterior caudal vertebrae.

=== Phylogeny ===
The combination of characters present in the new axial remains described, supports the placement of Lirainosaurus as a derived lithostrotian titanosaur closely related to the Saltasaurinae. The results of an unpublished SVPCA abstract published in 2016 narrow down the exact position of Lirainosaurus by placing it as closer to Alamosaurus and Opisthocoelicaudia than to Saltasaurus. Later, Diez Diaz et al. (2018) erected Lirainosaurinae to accommodate Lirainosaurus as well as Ampelosaurus and Atsinganosaurus.

== Paleoenvironment ==
Specimens have been found in the North-Pyrenean site of Bellevue, which is located at the base of the Marnes de la Maurine member of the Marnes Rouges Inférieures Formation. Marine biostratigraphic testing of the formation places its age somewhere between Late Campanian to Early Maastrichtian. Other contemporary dinosaurs in the Bellevue layer include the titanosaur sauropod Ampelosaurus, the rhabdodontid Rhabdodon and indeterminate ankylosaur and Dromaeosauridae elements.

Other material ascribed to Lirainosaurus have been found in the Fox-Amphoux–Métisson locality, where no magnetostratigraphic dating has been performed. However, the local stratigraphy presents the same succession of facies as in the Aix-en-Provence Basin, which is also in the Late Campanian to Early Maastrichtian age.
