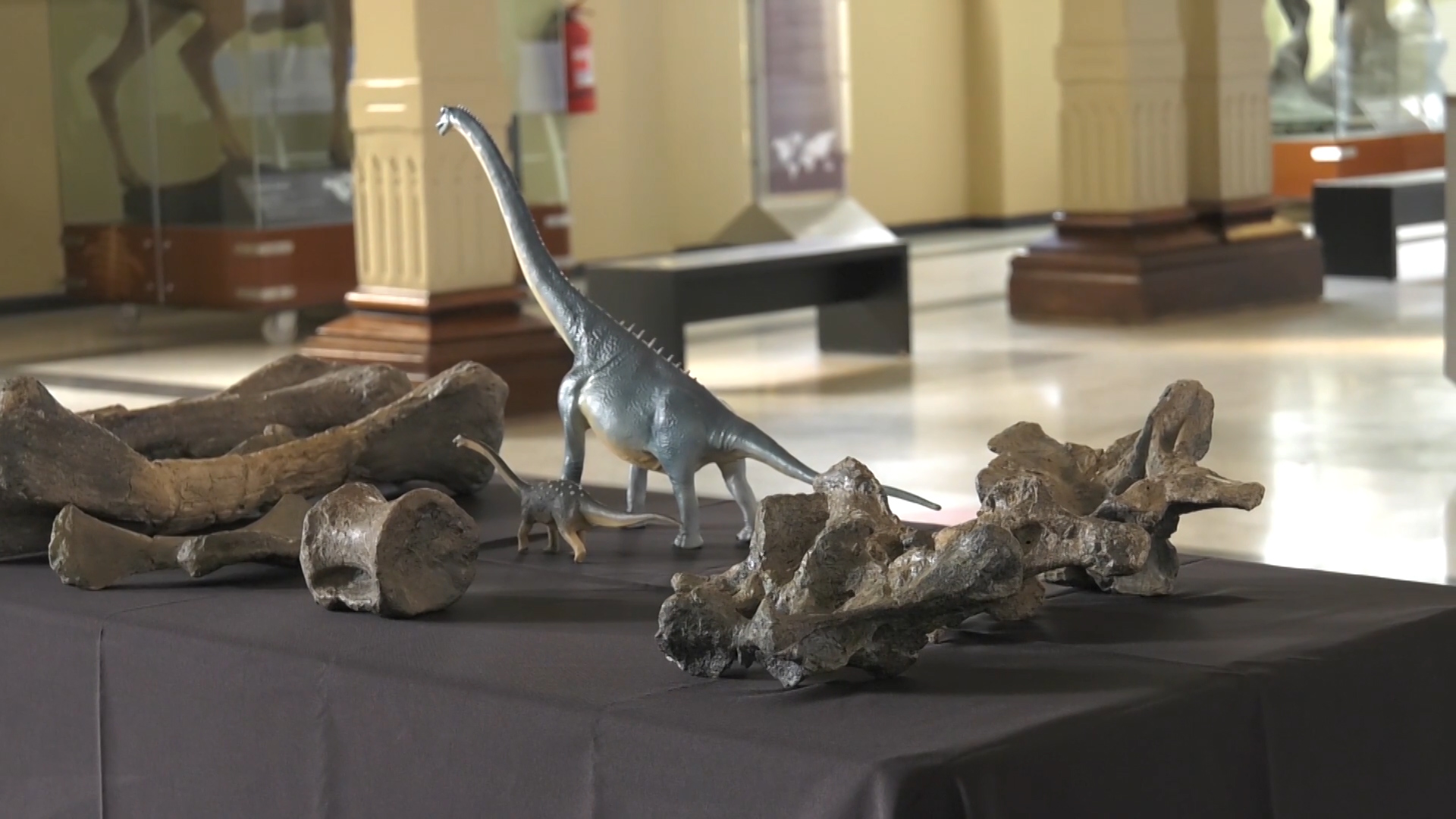
- Model, next to one of Saltasaurus (from the Carnegie collection), and remains of Arackar licanantay, presented in the Museo Nacional de Historia Natural (MNHN) from Chile

Scientific classification
- Kingdom: Animalia
- Phylum: Chordata
- Class: Reptilia
- Clade: Dinosauria
- Clade: Saurischia
- Clade: †Sauropodomorpha
- Clade: †Sauropoda
- Clade: †Macronaria
- Clade: †Titanosauria
- Clade: †Lithostrotia
- Genus: †Arackar; Rubilar-Rogers et al., 2021
- Species: †A. licanantay

Binomial name
- †Arackar licanantay Rubilar-Rogers et al., 2021

= Arackar =

Arackar Temporal range: Late Cretaceous, 83.6–66 Ma Campanian-Maastrichtian

Genus of lithostrotian dinosaur from the Late Cretaceous period

Arackar (meaning "skeleton" in Kunza) is an extinct genus of lithostrotian sauropod, possibly part of the Saltasauridae, discovered in the Hornitos Formation of Atacama Province, Chile. The genus contains a single species, Arackar licanantay, described by Rubilar-Rogers et al. in 2021.

== Discovery and naming ==
The holotype was discovered in 1993 at Quebrada La Higuera, approximately 75 km (47 mi) south of Copiapó. The fossil material was briefly mentioned by Rubilar-Rogers & Gutstein in 2012 and was found to not be referable to the genus Atacamatitan. In 2021, Arackar licanantay was named and described by David Rubilar-Rogers, Alexander O. Vargas, Bernardo González Riga, Sergio Soto-Acuña, Jhonatan Alarcón-Muñoz, José Iriarte-Díaz, Carlos Arévalo and Carolina S. Gutstein.

The holotype, SNGM-1, was found in a layer of the Hornitos Formation in Chile that dates back to the Late Cretaceous period (Campanian-Maastrichtian stages). It includes vertebrae of the neck and back, as well as a humerus, femur and ischium. It belonged to a juvenile and is currently the most complete specimen of a sauropod found in Chile.

The full binomial name, Arackar licanantay, translates to "bones of the Atacamans" in the Kunza language.

== Description ==
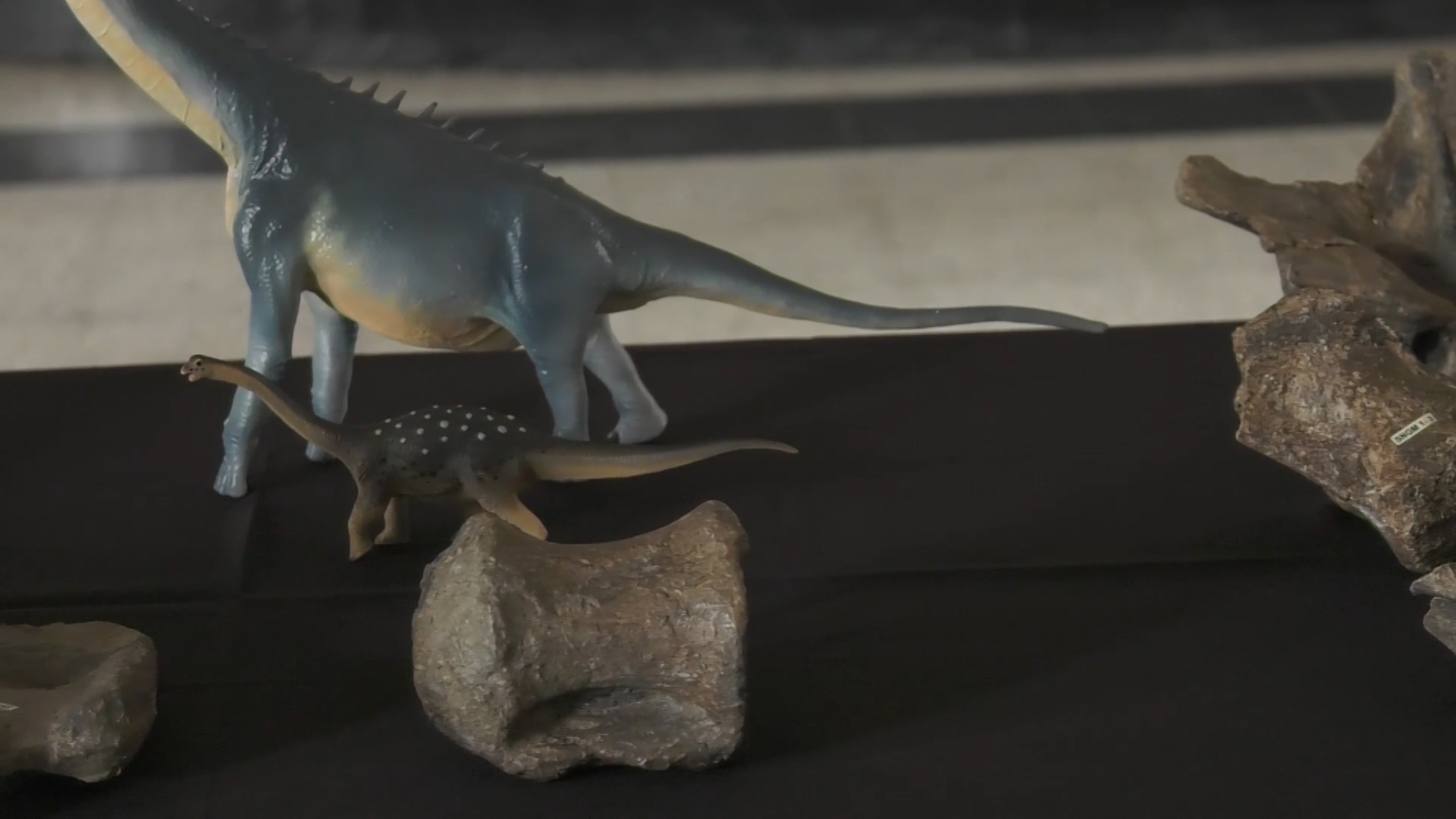
Vertebra

The holotype represents a small individual with a body length estimated at around 6.3 metres (21 ft) long. The size of a fully grown Arackar is unknown.

Some distinctive features have been identified by Ruilar-Rogers et al.. The hollowing out between the front joint process and the vertebral body is high and wide. The hollowing out between the parapophysis and the lamina between the front joint process and the vertebral body extends over the entire front of the pedestal of the neural arch but not above the spinal canal. The posterior joint processes are narrower than the neural spine. The ridges between the neural spine and the posterior joint processes are reduced and shorter than the facet of the posterior joint process.

== Classification ==
Arackar was placed in the Titanosauria within the Lithostrotia in 2021, as a sister taxon of Isisaurus. Together, they form a sister clade to Rapetosaurus, within the Lithostrotia. The cladogram from Rubilar-Rogers et al. (2021) is shown below:

- Lithostrotia
  - Malawisaurus
  - - Baurutitan
    - - - Rapetosaurus
        - - Arackar
          - Isisaurus
      - - Tapuiasaurus
        - - Alamosaurus
          - - Opisthocoelicaudia
            - Saltasaurinae
