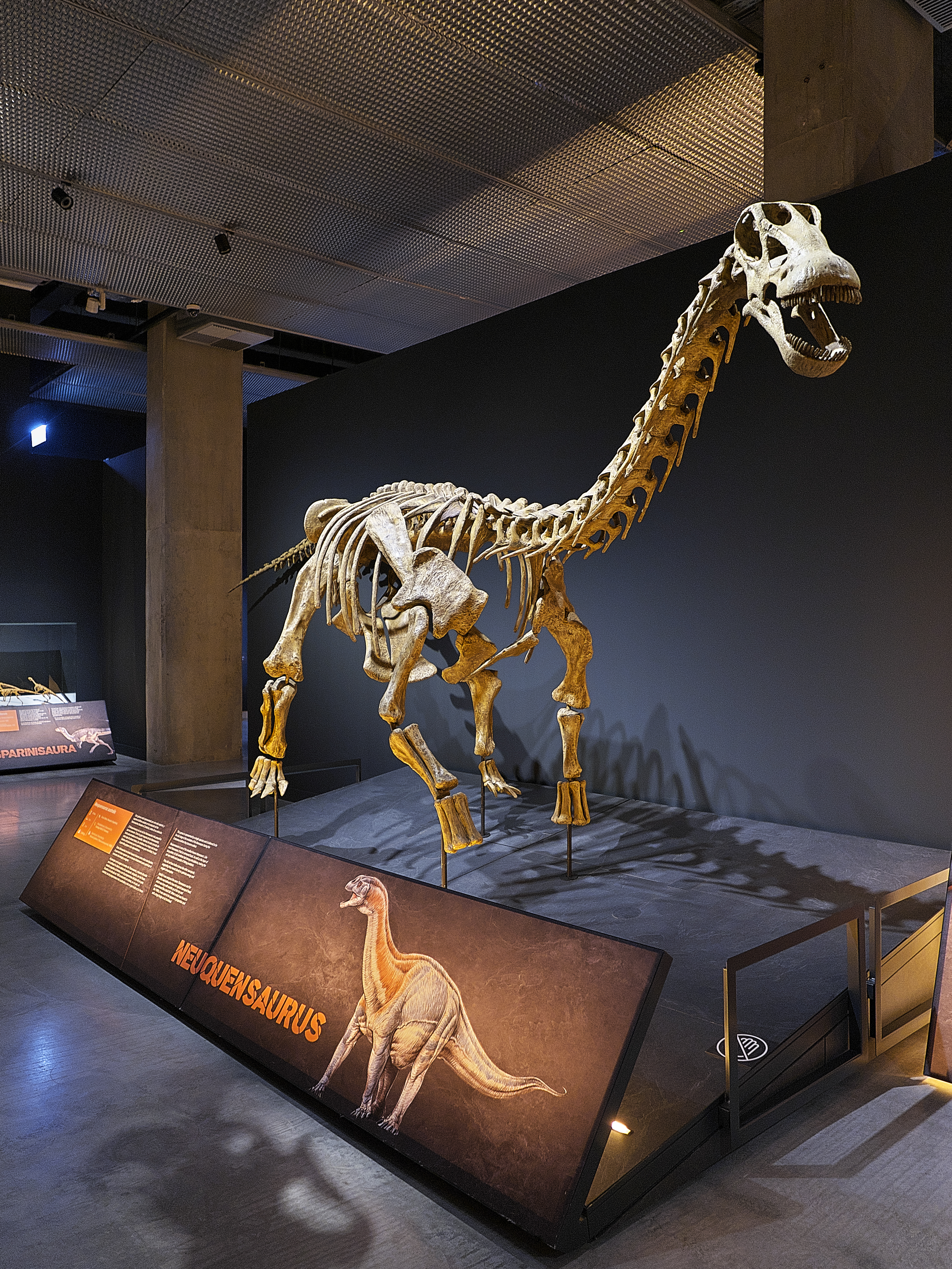
- N. australis skeletal mount, Museo paleontológico Egidio Feruglio

Scientific classification
- Kingdom: Animalia
- Phylum: Chordata
- Class: Reptilia
- Clade: Dinosauria
- Clade: Saurischia
- Clade: †Sauropodomorpha
- Clade: †Sauropoda
- Clade: †Macronaria
- Clade: †Titanosauria
- Family: †Saltasauridae
- Tribe: †Saltasaurini
- Genus: †Neuquensaurus; Powell, 1992

Type species
- †Titanosaurus australis Lydekker, 1893

Species
- †N. australis (Lydekker, 1893); †N. robustus (Huene, 1929 [originally Titanosaurus]) (nomen dubium)

Synonyms
- Genus synonymy: Microcoelus? Lydekker, 1893; Loricosaurus? von Huene, 1929; Species synonymy: Microcoelus patagonicus? Lydekker, 1893; Titanosaurus australis Lydekker, 1893; Titanosaurus nanus Lydekker, 1893; Titanosaurus robustus von Huene, 1929; Loricosaurus scutatus? von Huene, 1929; Saltasaurus australis (Lydekker, 1893 [originally Titanosaurus]); Saltasaurus robustus (von Huene, 1929 [originally Titanosaurus])

= Neuquensaurus =

Neuquensaurus Temporal range: Late Cretaceous, 83–74.5 Ma

Extinct genus of dinosaurs

Neuquensaurus (meaning "Neuquén lizard") is a genus of saltasaurid sauropod dinosaur that lived in the Late Cretaceous, about 83-74.5 million years ago in Argentina in South America. Its fossils were recovered from outcrops of the Anacleto Formation around Cinco Saltos, near the Neuquén river from which its name is derived.

== History ==
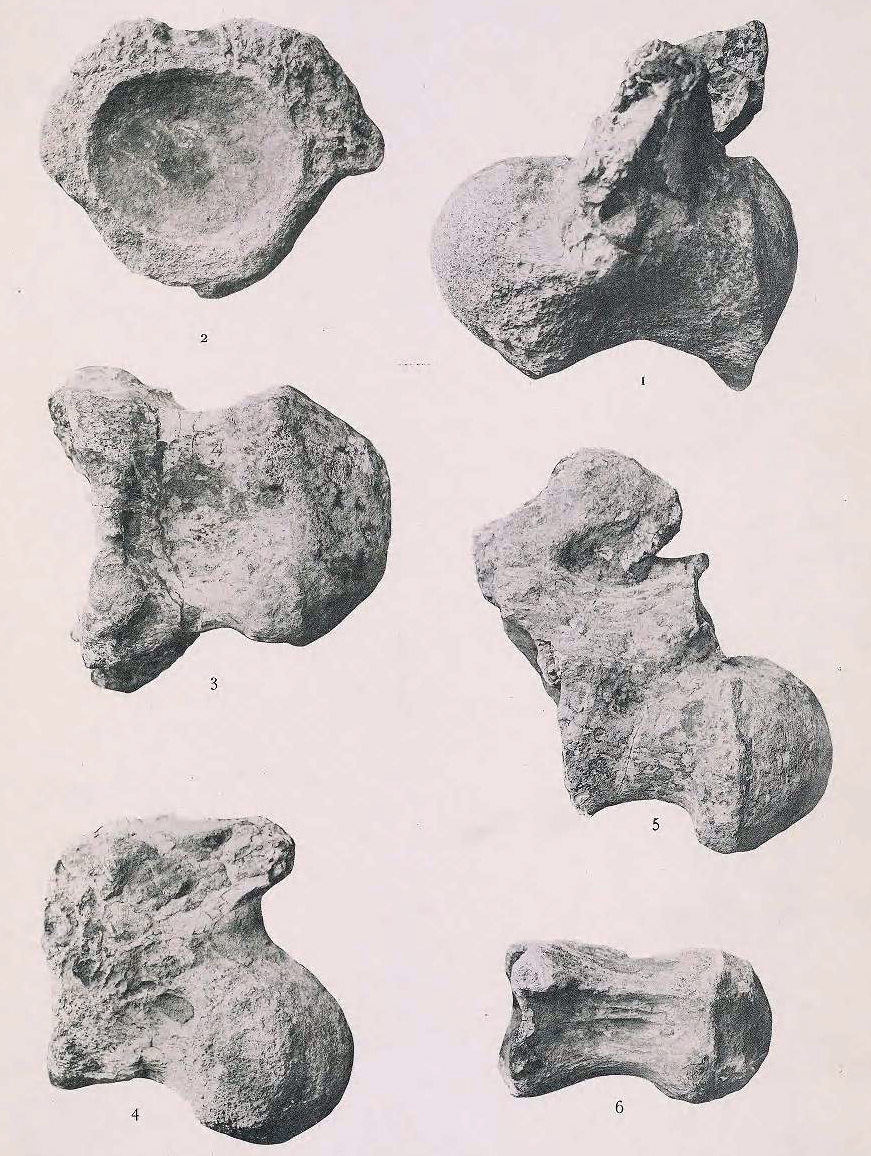
Holotypic caudal vertebrae

In 1893, Richard Lydekker named Titanosaurus australis, based on a series of caudal vertebrae and limb elements. The remains had been found by Santiago Roth and F. Romero in the Neuquén Province of Argentina at the Neuquén River, and were by Lydekker assigned to a single individual. Six caudal vertebrae, with the inventory numbers MLP Ly 1-6-V-28-1, were the holotype of the species. They had probably been found in a layer of the Anacleto Formation.

Some elements that had been referred to Titanosaurus australis were reassigned to Laplatasaurus araukanicus by Friedrich von Huene in 1929. The same year, von Huene named a Titanosaurus robustus, and claimed it differed from T. australis in the limb material. Von Huene described all the slender limb material to T. australis, but did not identify any differentiating features between the vertebrae. When describing T. robustus, von Huene did not really compare other genera and species to it. From the syntype material assigned by von Huene to T. robustus José Fernando Bonaparte et al. in 1978 chose four lectotypes, specimens MLP 26-250, MLP 26-252, MLP 26-254, and MLP 26-259, a left femur, both ulnae, and a left radius.

In 1986, Jaime Eduardo Powell, concluding that Titanosaurus australis was less similar than Laplatasaurus araukanicus to Titanosaurus indicus, named a separate genus: Neuquensaurus. However, he did so in an unpublished dissertation which caused Neuquensaurus australis and Neuquensaurus robustus to remain invalid nomina ex dissertatione. In 1990, the two species were assigned to Saltasaurus by John Stanton McIntosh, as a Saltasaurus australis and a Saltasaurus robustus, claiming that the features found by Bonaparte were not of sufficient taxonomic importance to justify a generic separation.

In 1992 Powell validly named Neuquensaurus, with as type species Titanosaurus australis of which the combinatio nova then is Neuquensaurus australis. He also found Titanosaurus robustus to be assignable to the new genus, but considered it non-diagnostical, and so a nomen dubium.

== Description ==
Size comparison

This dinosaur is believed to have possessed armor-like osteoderms. A relatively small sauropod, with a femur only 0.75 metres (2.5 ft) long. It is one of the most completely known of Patagonian sauropods, measuring 7–9 metres (23–30 ft) long and weighing 1.8–3.5 metric tons (2.0–3.9 short tons). In addition to the original fossils described by Lydekker in 1893, it is represented by fossils collected in the early twentieth century, and more recent material, including a well preserved and partially articulated specimen described in 2005 (with two associated osteoderms).

Cervical vertebrae are known from multiple specimens of Neuquensaurus, although few are definitively associated with any other material. The centra are elongate, compressed vertically, and strongly opisthocoelous, with an ovoid pleurocoel and rounded neural spine. Diagnostic of Saltasaurinae, the prezygapophyses are shortened and robust and the postzygapophyses extend far posteriorly to compensate. The lateral projections of the neural arch (transverse processes) are far more robust than in Isisaurus. As in the cervicals, the dorsal vertebrae bear strongly opisthocoelous centra with lateral pneumatic openings. In the dorsals, however, the pleurocoels are posteriorly pinched and internally subdivided, a regular feature of titanosaurs. The pleurocoels of Neuquensaurus are proportionally taller than in Trigonosaurus or Lirainosaurus. A ventral keel is lost throughout the dorsal series of probably 10 vertebrae, although the total count is uncertain. The vertebrae also lean less posteriorly towards the pelvis, initially inclined far beyond their individual centrum. However, they lack the hyposphene-hypantrum articulations of non-titanosaurs that limit vertebral motion. Two accessory laminae are present in the dorsals of Neuquensaurus that are absent even in the close relatives Saltasaurus and Rocasaurus. Unique among all sauropods, the sacrum of Neuquensaurus is composed of seven vertebrae. The last vertebra is convex anteriorly and posteriorly, and diagnostically the middle vertebrae are strongly compressed in width. Like other derived titanosaurs, all caudal vertebrae of Neuquensaurus are strongly procoelous and vertically compressed. There is a prominent ventral depression like in Saltasaurus and Rocasaurus, but contrasting the other genera there is no ridge dividing this depression. Additionally, the neural spines of vertebrae become progressively more reclined, and a prespinal lamina is present in all vertebrae.

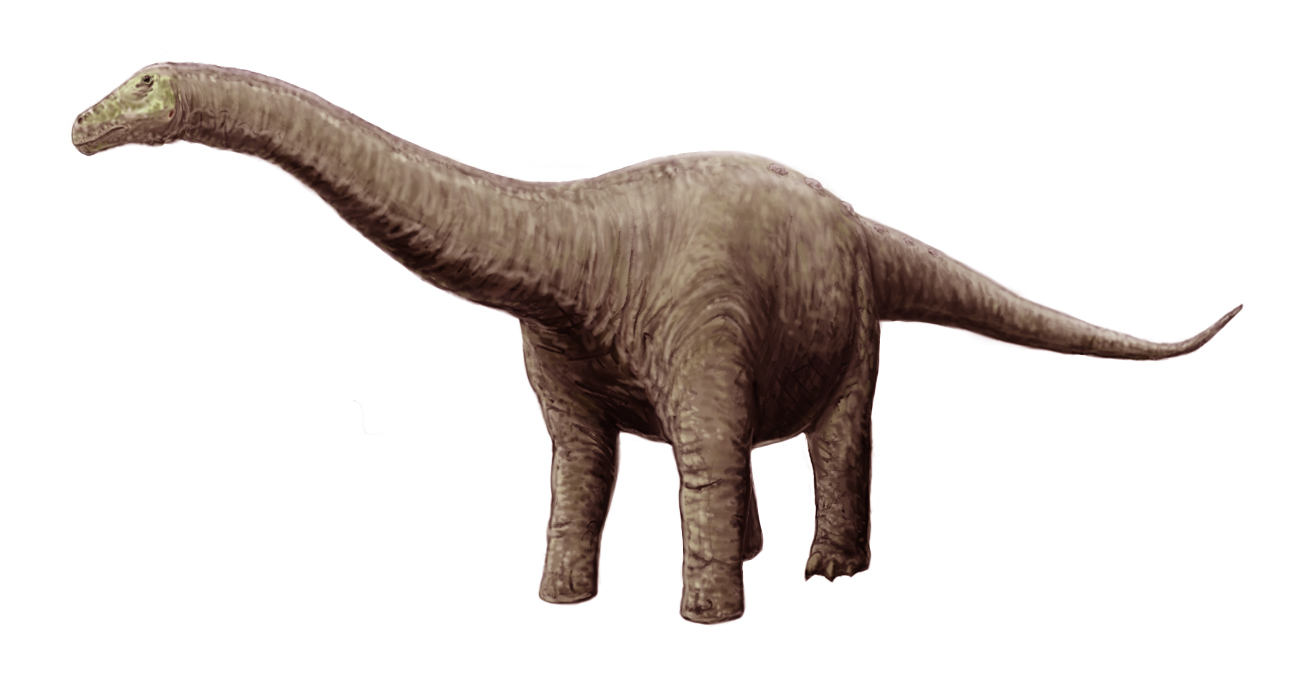
Life restoration

Neuquensaurus has an almost complete skeleton. Among the preserved elements are a scapula. The scapula is co-ossified with the coracoid, a feature also found in Opisthocoelicaudia. In general aspect, the scapula resembles Saltasaurus, Opisthocoelicaudia, Lirainosaurus, and Alamosaurus. The coracoids of the scapulae are roughly quadrangular in shape, and are alike Saltasaurus and Lirainosaurus, but not Opisthocoelicaudia, Rapetosaurus, or Isisaurus, all of which have a rounded coracoid.

Many characters distinguish Neuquensaurus from other titanosaurians. The features found by Otero in 2010 are: the possession of posterior caudal centra that are dorsoventrally flattened, and strongly developed fibular lateral tuberosity.

Geometric morphometric analysis of the vertebral centra of Neuquensaurus suggests that two distinct morphotypes existed, one of which had four spinoprezygapophyseal laminae and included specimens assigned to both N. australis and N. robustus, potentially lending validity to the hypothesis that two different species of Neuquensaurus existed.

== Classification ==
Neuquensaurus is a derived saltasaurine. Its closest relatives were Saltasaurus, Rocasaurus, and Bonatitan, and together they made up Saltasaurinae.

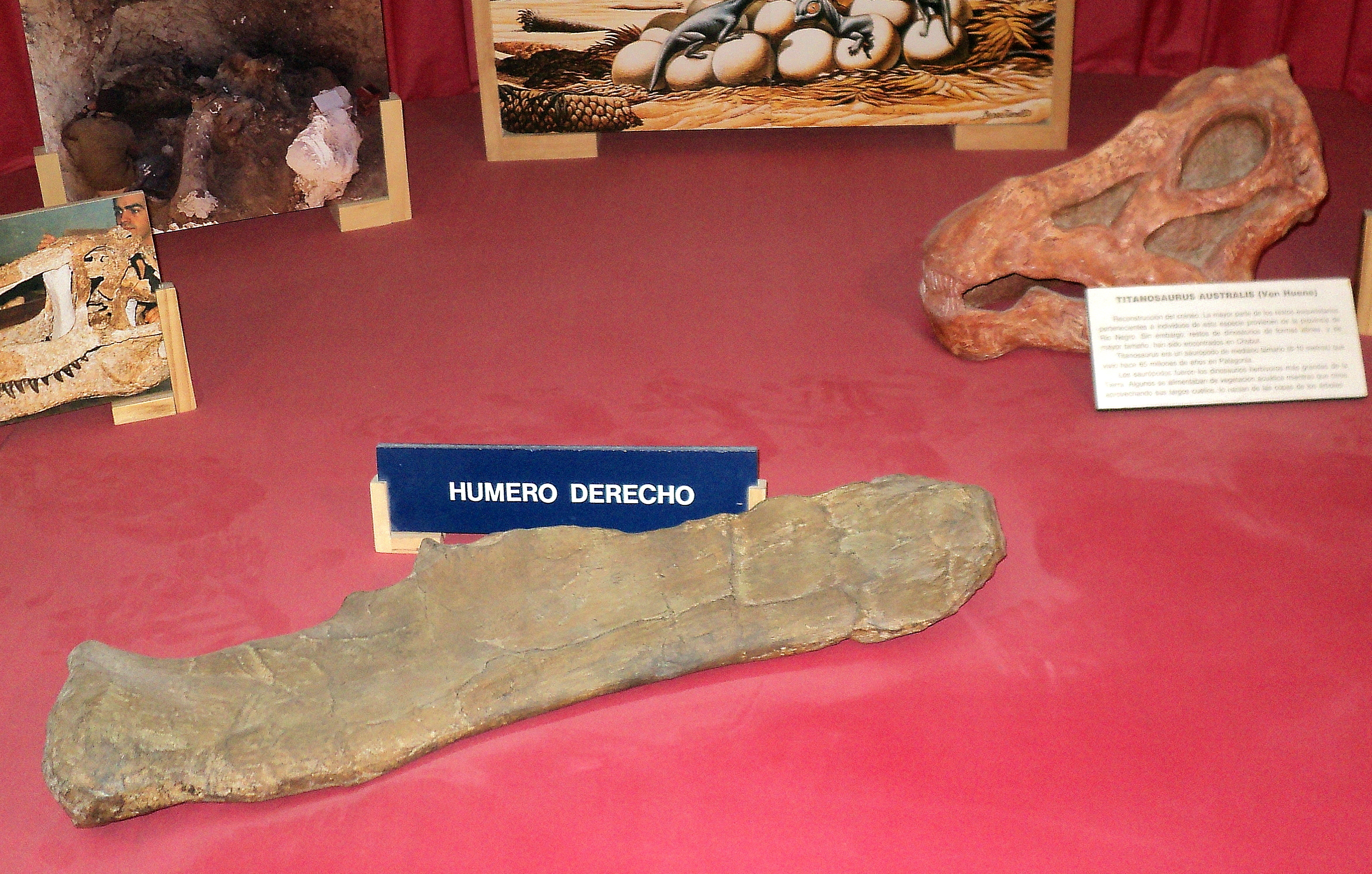
Humerus and replica skull

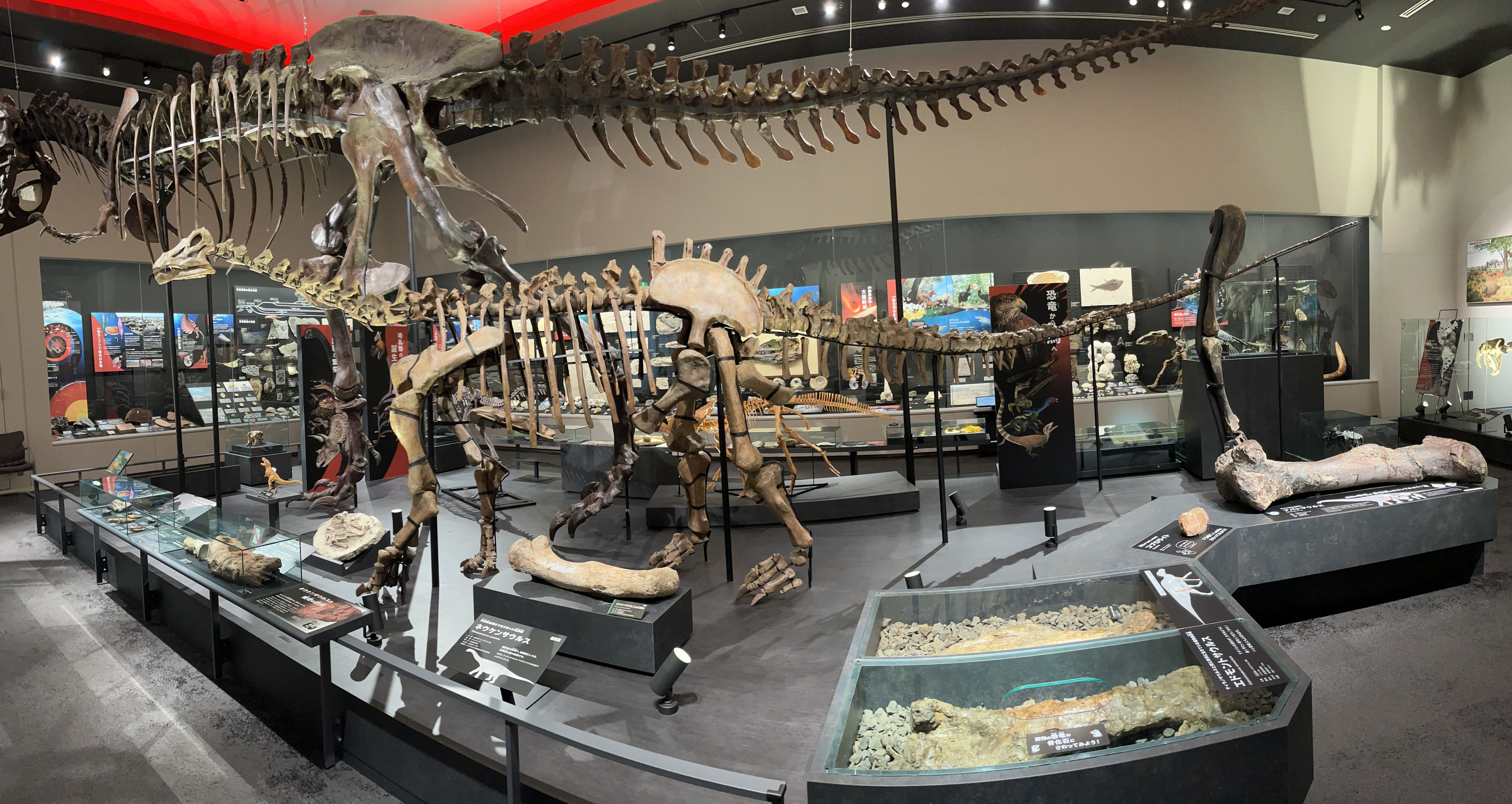
Restored skeleton of N. australis

The cladogram from Rubilar-Rogers et al. (2021) is shown below:

- Lithostrotia
  - Malawisaurus
  - - Baurutitan
    - - - Rapetosaurus
        - - Arackar
          - Isisaurus
      - - Tapuiasaurus
        - - Alamosaurus
          - - Opisthocoelicaudia
            - - Neuquensaurus
              - Saltasaurus

== Paleoecology ==
Neuquensaurus is known from fossils from the Anacleto Formation.
