= Loricosaurus =

Loricosaurus Temporal range: Late Cretaceous, 71 Ma early Maastrichtian

Scientific classification
- Kingdom: Animalia
- Phylum: Chordata
- Class: Reptilia
- Clade: Dinosauria
- Clade: Saurischia
- Clade: †Sauropodomorpha
- Clade: †Sauropoda
- Clade: †Macronaria
- Clade: †Titanosauria
- Family: †Saltasauridae
- Subfamily: †Saltasaurinae
- Genus: †Loricosaurus von Huene, 1929
- Species: †L. scutatus

Binomial name
- †Loricosaurus scutatus von Huene, 1929

Extinct genus of reptiles

Loricosaurus (meaning "armor lizard") is a genus of sauropod represented by a single species, L. scutatus. It is a titanosaur that lived near the end of the Late Cretaceous period, approximately 71 million years ago in the early Maastrichtian, being found in the province of Neuquen, Argentina in the Allen Formation. Due to the presence of armor, at first it was believed that it was an ankylosaur, but today it is considered to be that of a titanosaur.

== Armour ==
The armour of Loricosaurus has caused some controversy. When Huene first described it, he considered it to be from an ankylosaur. Later, it was discovered to not belong to ankylosaurs, but to belong to titanosaurs. Now it is considered to possibly belong to Neuquensaurus or Saltasaurus.

== Species ==
In 1929 von Huene described Loricosaurus based on some armour osteoderms found in Argentina. The type species, Loricosaurus scutatus, is now considered possibly a synonym of Neuquensaurus.

== See also ==
- †Neuquensaurus
- †Saltasaurus
