= Magdalena Borsuk-Białynicka =

Polish paleontologist and phylogeneticist

Doctor M. Magdalena Borsuk-Białynicka
- Born: January 29, 1940 (age 86); Warsaw, Poland
- Education: MSc, DSc, PhD
- Alma mater: Warsaw University
- Known for: Polish and Mongolian fossils
- Spouse: Andrzej Białynicki-Birula
- Scientific career
- Fields: Paleontology
- Institutions: Institute of Paleobiology, Polish Academy of Sciences
- Website: www.paleo.pan.pl/pracownicy/borsuk-bialynicka/

Maria Magdalena Borsuk-Białynicka (born January 29, 1940) is a Polish paleontologist and phylogeneticist born in 1940 in Warsaw, Poland. She received both her Master of Science and Doctor of Philosophy degrees in Warsaw University, before completing her Doctor of Science at Jagiellonian University. In 2001 she became an official Professor in Paleontology. Borsuk-Białynicka has taught alternately at Warsaw University (1964–1975, 1986–1991, 1993–1996, 1997–1998) and University of Adam Mickiewicz (1990, 1992, 1994, 1996, 1998), while also supervising MSc and PhD students at both universities and the Silesian University. Her current (2017) PhD students are Marec Dek, Piotr Skrzycki and Dawid Surmik, who specialize in agnathan fishes, Triassic lungfish and Triassic marine reptiles respectively. Borsuk-Białynicka was a co-editor of the journal Palaeontologia Polonica volume 65 in 2009, and an assistant editor for the monographs in the journal from 1990 to 1997. Borsuk-Białynicka has named the sauropod Opisthocoelicaudia in 1977, the pelobatid frog Eopelobates leptocolaptus in 1978, the lacertoids Globaura and Eoxanta in 1988, the gekkonid Gobekko in 1990, and the archosauromorph Osmolskina in 2009.
