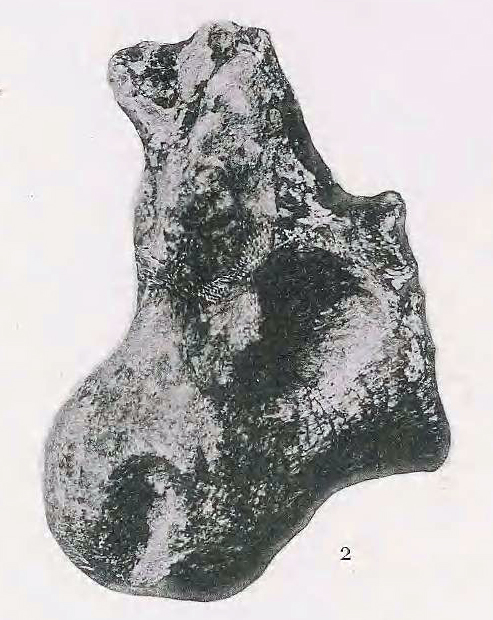
- Holotype dorsal vertebra

Scientific classification
- Kingdom: Animalia
- Phylum: Chordata
- Class: Reptilia
- Clade: Dinosauria
- Clade: Saurischia
- Clade: †Sauropodomorpha
- Clade: †Sauropoda
- Clade: †Macronaria
- Clade: †Titanosauria
- Family: †Saltasauridae
- Subfamily: †Saltasaurinae
- Genus: †Microcoelus; Lydekker, 1893
- Species: †M. patagonicus

Binomial name
- †Microcoelus patagonicus Lydekker, 1893

= Microcoelus =

Microcoelus Temporal range: Late Cretaceous Santonian

Extinct genus of dinosaurs

Microcoelus (meaning "small hollow") is a dubious genus of small titanosaurian sauropod dinosaur from the Late Cretaceous (Santonian stage) Bajo de la Carpa Formation, Argentina. It is known from only a single dorsal vertebra, although a left humerus was formerly referred to this taxon, but it is now considered to belong to Neuquensaurus. The type (and only known) species is M. patagonicus, described by British paleontologist Richard Lydekker in 1893.
