= Hornitos Formation =

Campanian geologic

- Stratigraphic range: Late Cretaceous, Campanian–Maastrichtian
- Type: Geological formation

Lithology
- Primary: Limestone, sandstone, conglomerate
- Other: Marl, tuff

Location
- Coordinates: 28.0°S 70.3°W
- Approximate paleocoordinates: 30.6°S 54.5°W
- Region: Atacama
- Country: Chile
- Extent: Algarrobal Basin
- Hornitos Formation (Chile)

The Hornitos Formation is a Campanian geologic formation of the Algarrobal Basin in the Atacama Region of northern Chile. The formation comprises limestones, sandstones, conglomerates, marls and tuff. Dinosaur remains are among the fossils that have been recovered from the formation, including the sauropod Arackar licanantay.

== Description ==
The Hornillos Formation, deposited in the Algarrobal Basin, comprises sandstones, limestones, conglomerates, and caliches, intercalated with lavas and andesitic breccias and various volcanic rocks. Between these last is a conspicuous layer of rhyo-dactitic lithic tuff, which reaches up to 10 metres (33 ft) in thickness. Bones of indeterminate titanosaurs appear in a marly limestone stratum of 10 metres (33 ft) thick with decimeter-sized calcareous concretions. The smallest pieces were found as rollings, whereas the larger piece was included in the limestone.

The Hornitos Formation formerly was thought to be of Paleocene to Eocene age. The formation may be older and belong to the Early Cretaceous, as a granite intruded the rocks about 105 ± 10 Ma.

== See also ==
- List of dinosaur-bearing rock formations
  - List of stratigraphic units with indeterminate dinosaur fossils
- Abanico Formation
