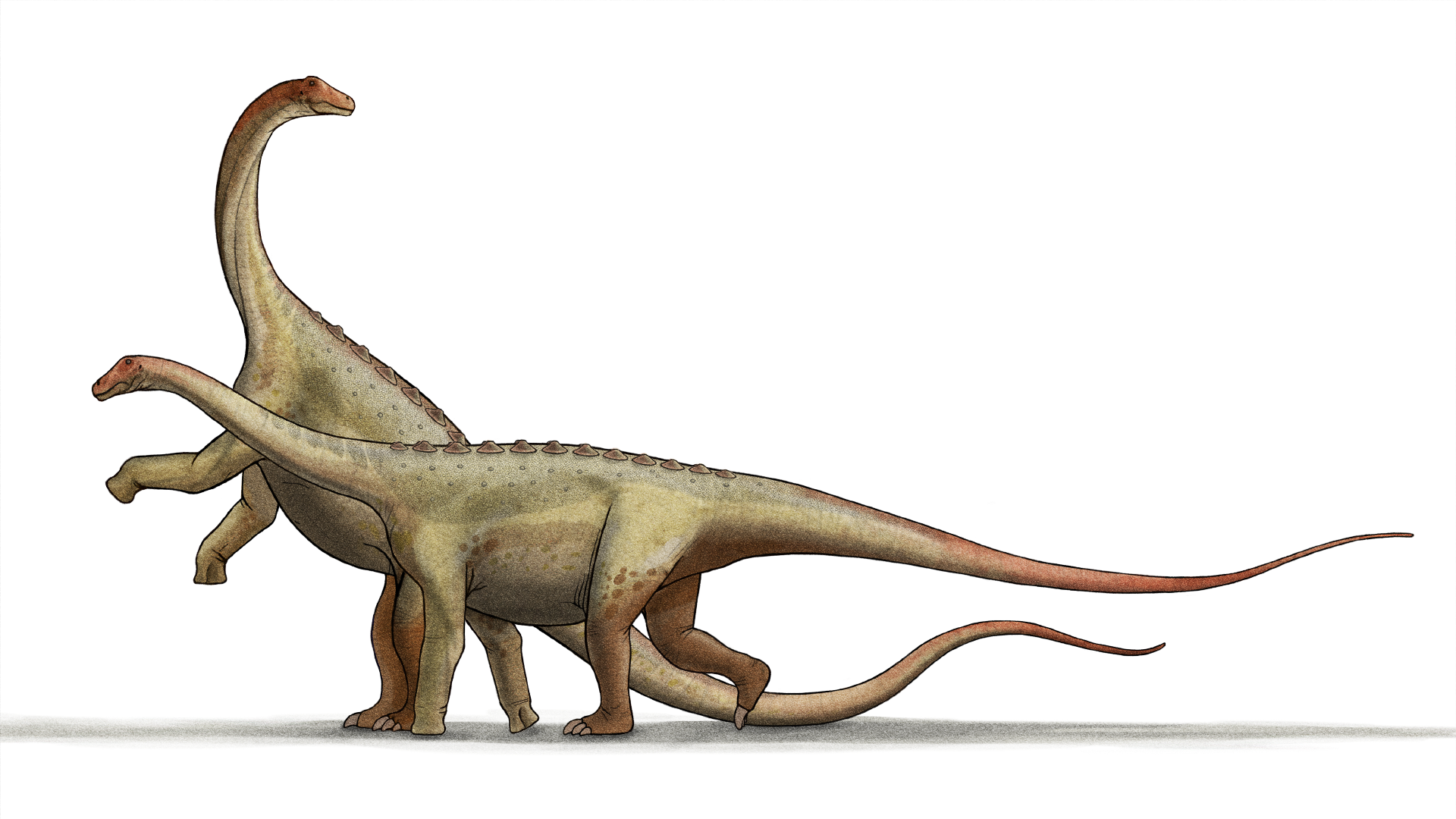
- Life restoration

Scientific classification
- Kingdom: Animalia
- Phylum: Chordata
- Class: Reptilia
- Clade: Dinosauria
- Clade: Saurischia
- Clade: †Sauropodomorpha
- Clade: †Sauropoda
- Clade: †Macronaria
- Clade: †Titanosauria
- Family: †Saltasauridae
- Genus: †Saltasaurus; Bonaparte & Powell, 1980
- Species: †S. loricatus

Binomial name
- †Saltasaurus loricatus Bonaparte & Powell, 1980

Synonyms
- Loricosaurus scutatus? von Huene, 1929

= Saltasaurus =

Saltasaurus Temporal range: Late Cretaceous, 70–68 Ma

Extinct genus of dinosaurs

Saltasaurus (which means "lizard from Salta") is a genus of saltasaurid dinosaur of the Late Cretaceous period of Argentina. Small among sauropods, though still heavy by the standards of modern creatures, Saltasaurus was characterized by a short neck and stubby limbs. It was the first genus of sauropod known to possess armour of bony plates embedded in its skin. Such small bony plates, called osteoderms, have since been found on other titanosaurians.

== Discovery ==
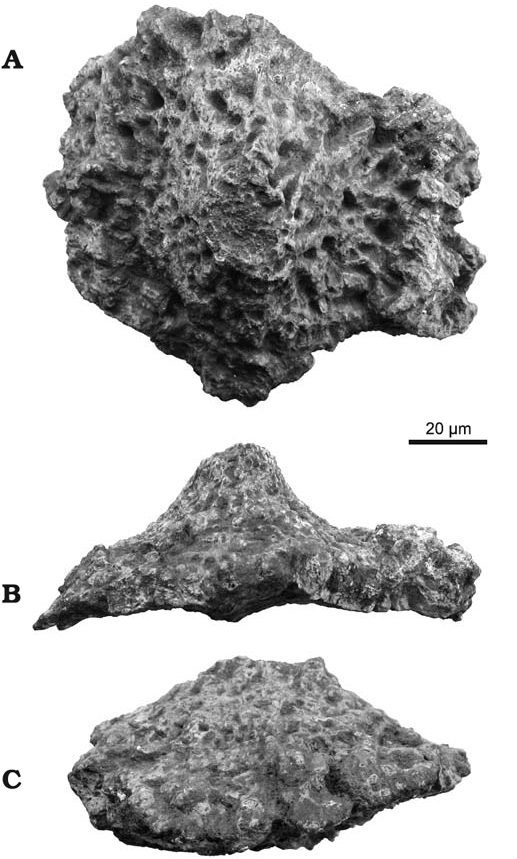
A large osteoderm

The fossils of Saltasaurus were excavated by José Bonaparte, Martín Vince and Juan C. Leal between 1975 and 1977 at the Estancia "El Brete". The find was in 1977 reported in the scientific literature.

Saltasaurus was named and described by Bonaparte and Jaime E. Powell in 1980. The type species is Saltasaurus loricatus. Its generic name is derived from Salta Province, the region of north-west Argentina where the first fossils were recovered. The specific name means "protected by small armoured plates" in Latin.

The holotype, PVL 4017-92, was found in a layer of the Lecho Formation dating from the early Maastrichtian stage of the Upper Cretaceous period, about seventy million years old. It consists of a sacrum connected to two ilia. Under the inventory number PVL 4017 over two hundred additional fossils have been catalogued. These include rear skull elements, teeth, vertebrae of the neck, back, hip and tail, parts of the shoulder girdle and the pelvis, and limb bones — plus various pieces of armour. These bones represent a minimum of five individuals, two adults and three juveniles or subadults.

Currently the only recognised species of Saltasaurus is S. loricatus. A S. robustus and a S. australis have been suggested but these are now considered to belong to a separate genus, Neuquensaurus. Earlier, armour plates from the area had been named as Loricosaurus by Friedrich von Huene who assumed them to be from an armoured ankylosaurian. It has been suggested these plates were in fact from Saltasaurus.

== Description ==
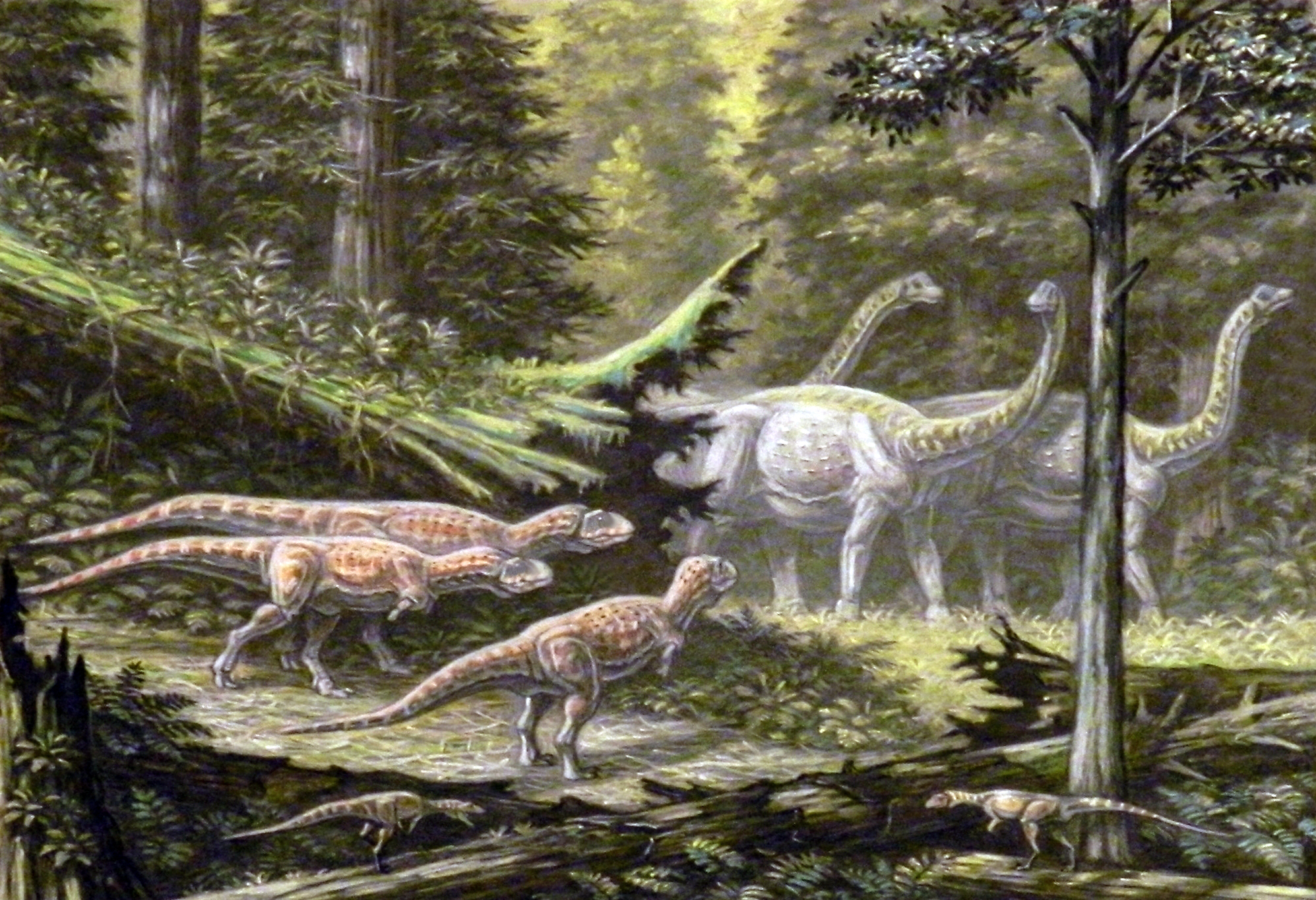
Saltasaurus herd passes abelisaurids and Noasaurus

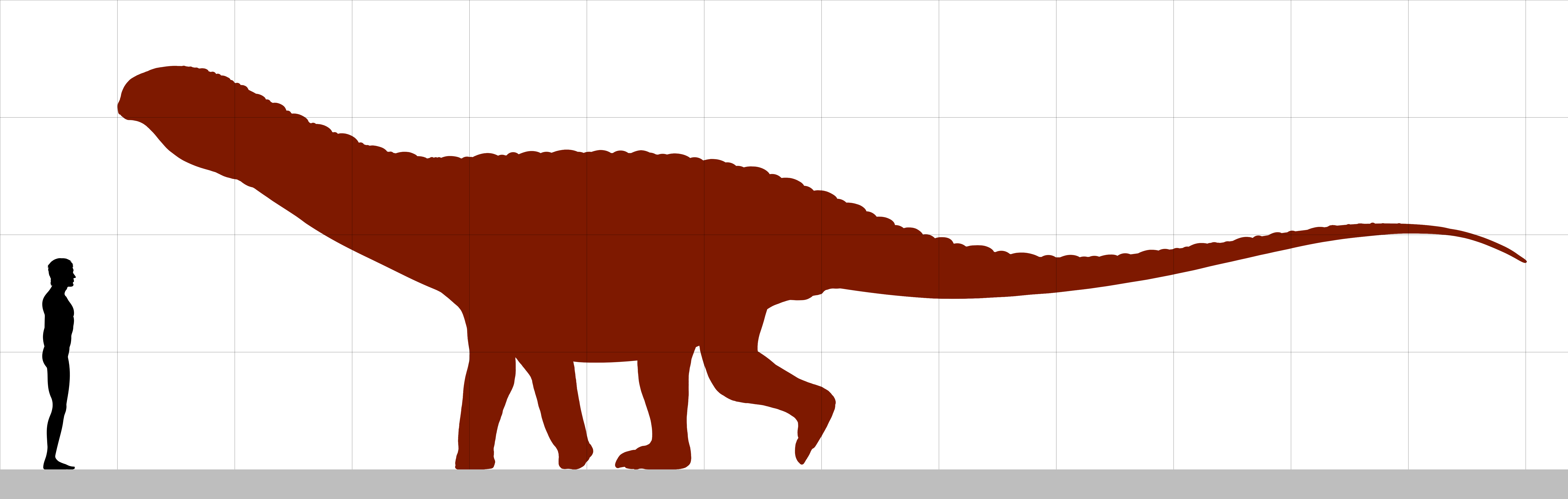
Size comparison of Saltasaurus, size based on Donald Henderson

Saltasaurus is very small compared to most other members of the Sauropoda. Powell estimated the adult length at six metres. In 2010, Gregory S. Paul estimated the maximum length at 8.5 m (28 ft) and the weight at 2.5 tonnes (2.8 short tons). Donald Henderson estimated a larger size of 12.8 m (42 ft) long and 6.87 tonnes (6.76 long tons; 7.57 short tons).

The teeth of Saltasaurus were cylindrical, with spatulate points. Saltasaurus had a relatively short neck with shortened neck vertebrae. The vertebrae from the middle part of its tail had elongated centra. Saltasaurus had vertebral lateral fossae, pleurocoels, that resembled shallow depressions. Fossae that similarly resemble shallow depressions are known from Malawisaurus, Alamosaurus, Aeolosaurus, and Gondwanatitan. Venenosaurus also had depression-like fossae, but its pleurocoels penetrated deeper into the vertebrae, were divided into two chambers, and extend farther into the vertebral columns. In Saltasaurus, the vertebral bone was generally cancellous and there were larger air chambers present as well. The limbs were short and stubby with especially short hands and feet. Saltasaurus had more robust radii than Venenosaurus. The belly was extremely wide.

The osteoderms came in two types. There were larger oval plates with a length of up to twelve centimetres. These were keeled or spiked and perhaps were ordered in longitudinal rows along the back. The second type consists of small ossicles, rounded or pentagonal, about seven millimetres in diameter, that formed a continuous armour between the plates. A study in 2010 concluded that the larger plates had cancellous bone but that the ossicles had a denser bone tissue.

== Phylogeny ==
Saltasaurus in a cladogram after Navarro et al., 2022:

- Saltasauridae
  - Opisthocoelicaudiinae
    - Opisthocoelicaudia
    - Nemegtosaurus
  - Saltasaurinae
    - - Alamosaurus
      - Baurutitan
    - - - Ibirania
        - - Bonatitan
          - Rocasaurus
      - Saltasaurini
        - Neuquensaurus
        - - MACN-PV-RN 233
          - Saltasaurus

== Palaeobiology ==
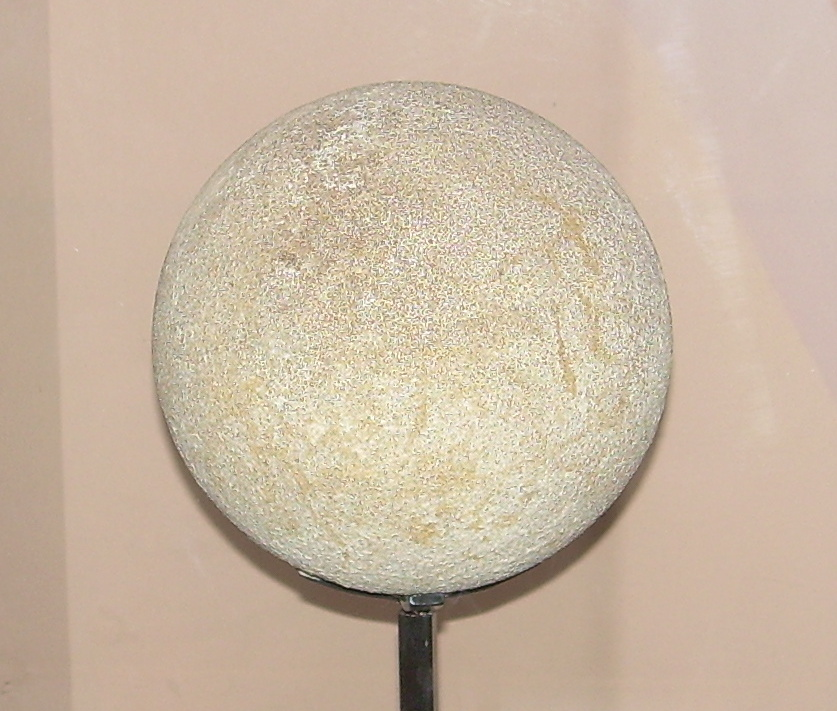
Egg on display at the North American Museum of Ancient Life

Like all sauropods, Saltasaurus was herbivorous. Because of its barrel-like rump, shaped like a hippopotamus, Powell suggested that Saltasaurus was aquatic. Despite its small stature, Saltasaurus was still graviportal like other sauropods, meaning it could not run because its hindlimbs had to be held straight at the load-bearing phase of their walking cycle. Powell assumed adult individuals were protected against predators by their body armour, while juveniles were protected by the herd as a whole.

In the Cretaceous Period, sauropods in North America were no longer the dominant group of herbivorous dinosaurs with the exception of Alamosaurus, with the ornithopod and ceratopsian dinosaurs, such as Edmontosaurus and Triceratops, becoming the most abundant (this being most evident by the Late Cretaceous epoch). However, on other landmasses such as South America and Africa (which were island continents much like modern Australia) sauropods, in particular the titanosaurs, continued to be the dominant herbivores.

Saltasaurus was one such titanosaur sauropod, and lived around 70 million years ago. When it was first discovered, in 1975, it forced palaeontologists to reconsider some assumptions about sauropods as Saltasaurus possessed crocodile-like armour (osteoderms) 10 to 12 centimetres (4 to 5 in) in diameter. Previously, it had been assumed that size alone was sufficient defence for the massive sauropods. Since then, palaeontologists have investigated the possibility that other sauropods may also have had armour; for example, Laplatasaurus.

A new discovery, from another formation, may shed light on the nesting habits of Saltasaurus. A large titanosaurid nesting ground was discovered in Auca Mahuevo, in Patagonia, Argentina (another titanosaur nesting site has reportedly been discovered in Spain). Several hundred female saltasaurines dug holes with their back feet, laid eggs in clutches averaging around 25 eggs each, and buried the nests under dirt and vegetation. The small eggs, about 11–12 cm (4–5 in) in diameter, contained fossilised embryos, complete with skin impressions showing a mosaic armour of small bead-like scales. The armour pattern resembled that of Saltasaurus.
