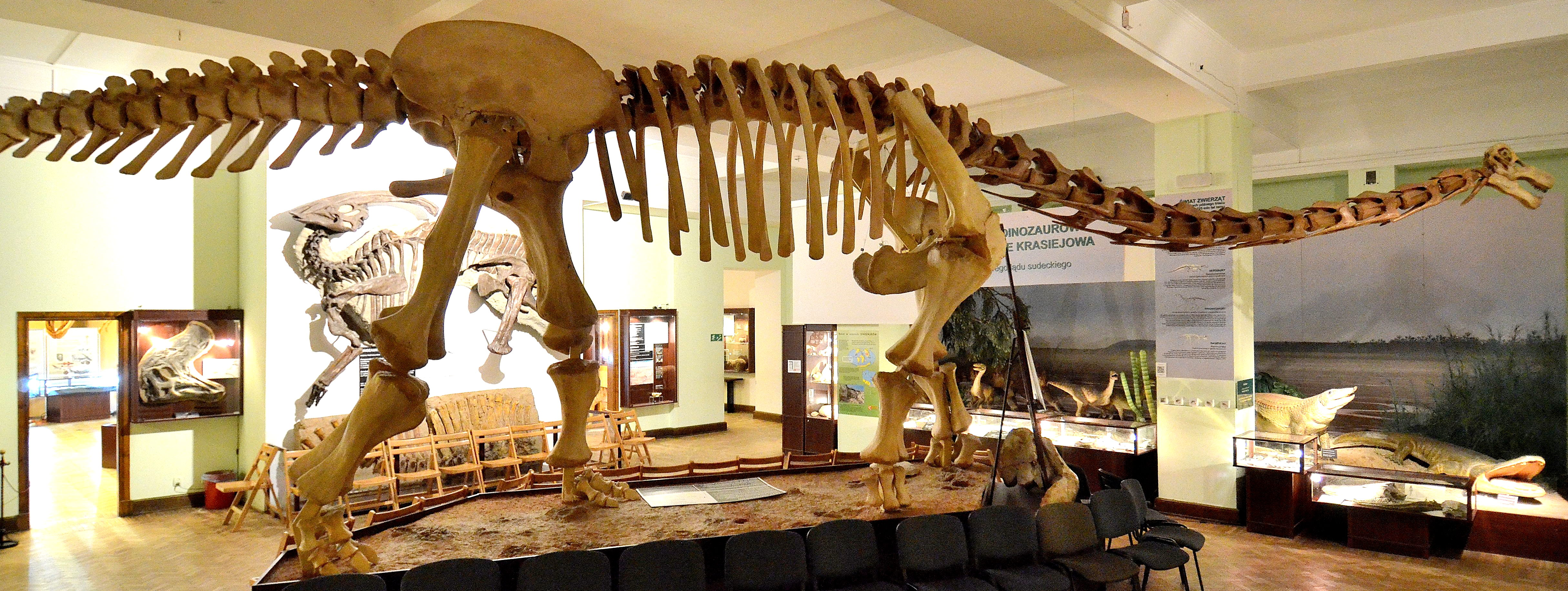
- Skeleton restoration of Opisthocoelicaudia in the Museum of Evolution of Polish Academy of Sciences, Warsaw

Scientific classification
- Kingdom: Animalia
- Phylum: Chordata
- Class: Reptilia
- Clade: Dinosauria
- Clade: Saurischia
- Clade: †Sauropodomorpha
- Clade: †Sauropoda
- Clade: †Eusauropoda
- Clade: †Macronaria
- Clade: †Titanosauria
- Family: †Saltasauridae
- Genus: †Opisthocoelicaudia; Borsuk-Białynicka, 1977
- Species: †O. skarzynskii

Binomial name
- †Opisthocoelicaudia skarzynskii Borsuk-Białynicka, 1977

= Opisthocoelicaudia =

Opisthocoelicaudia Temporal range: Late Cretaceous, Maastrichtian

Sauropod dinosaur genus from Late Cretaceous Mongolia

Opisthocoelicaudia /ɒˌpɪsθoʊsɪlɪˈkɔːdiə/ is a genus of sauropod dinosaur of the Late Cretaceous Period discovered in the Gobi Desert of Mongolia. The type species is Opisthocoelicaudia skarzynskii. A well-preserved skeleton lacking only the head and neck was unearthed in 1965 by Polish and Mongolian scientists, making Opisthocoelicaudia one of the best known sauropods from the Late Cretaceous. Tooth marks on this skeleton indicate that large carnivorous dinosaurs had fed on the carcass and possibly had carried away the now-missing parts. To date, only two additional, much less complete specimens are known, including part of a shoulder and a fragmentary tail. A relatively small sauropod, Opisthocoelicaudia measured about 11.4–13 m (37–43 ft) in length. Like other sauropods, it would have been characterised by a small head sitting on a very long neck and a barrel shaped trunk carried by four column-like legs. The name Opisthocoelicaudia means "posterior cavity tail", alluding to the unusual, opisthocoel condition of the anterior tail vertebrae that were concave on their posterior sides. This and other skeletal features lead researchers to propose that Opisthocoelicaudia was able to rear on its hindlegs.

Named and described by Polish paleontologist Maria Magdalena Borsuk-Białynicka in 1977, Opisthocoelicaudia was first thought to be a new member of the Camarasauridae, but is currently considered a derived member of the Titanosauria. Its exact relationships within Titanosauria are contentious, but it may have been close to the North American Alamosaurus. All Opisthocoelicaudia fossils stem from the Nemegt Formation. Despite being rich in dinosaur fossils, the only other sauropod from this rock unit is Nemegtosaurus, which is known from a single skull. Since the skull of Opisthocoelicaudia remains unknown, several researchers have suggested that Nemegtosaurus and Opisthocoelicaudia may represent the same species. Sauropod footprints from the Nemegt Formation, which include skin impressions, can probably be referred to either Nemegtosaurus or Opisthocoelicaudia as these are the only known sauropods from this formation.

== Discovery and specimens ==
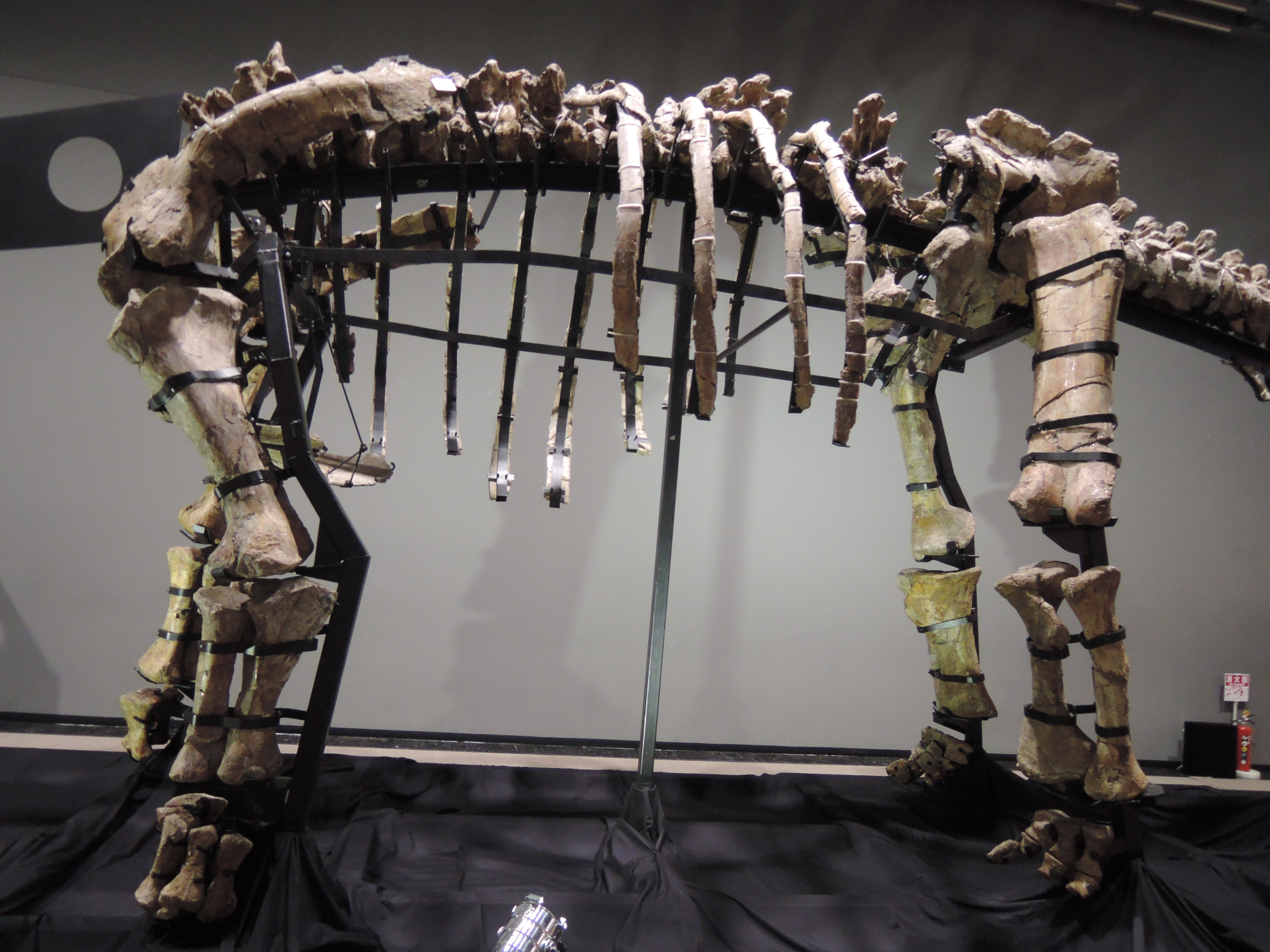
Mounted holotype specimen

The type specimen was discovered between June 10 and 23, 1965, during a joint Polish-Mongolian paleontological expedition led by Polish paleontologist Zofia Kielan-Jaworowska. The largest of a series of expeditions carried out in 1963–1971, this expedition involved 21 members, which at times were supported by additional hired Mongolian workers. The site of discovery is located in Ömnögovi Province in southern Mongolia in the Altan Uul area, which exposes some 100 km^{2} of badlands. The sediments exposed at Altan Uul belong to the Nemegt Formation, the youngest of the three geological formations of the Nemegt Basin. Opisthocoelicaudia was the first of several important dinosaur discoveries made by the 1965 expedition. The other finds, made at different localities, include several skeletons of the tyrannosaurid Tarbosaurus as well as the type specimens of the giant ornithomimosaur Deinocheirus, the sauropod Nemegtosaurus, and the pachycephalosaur Homalocephale.

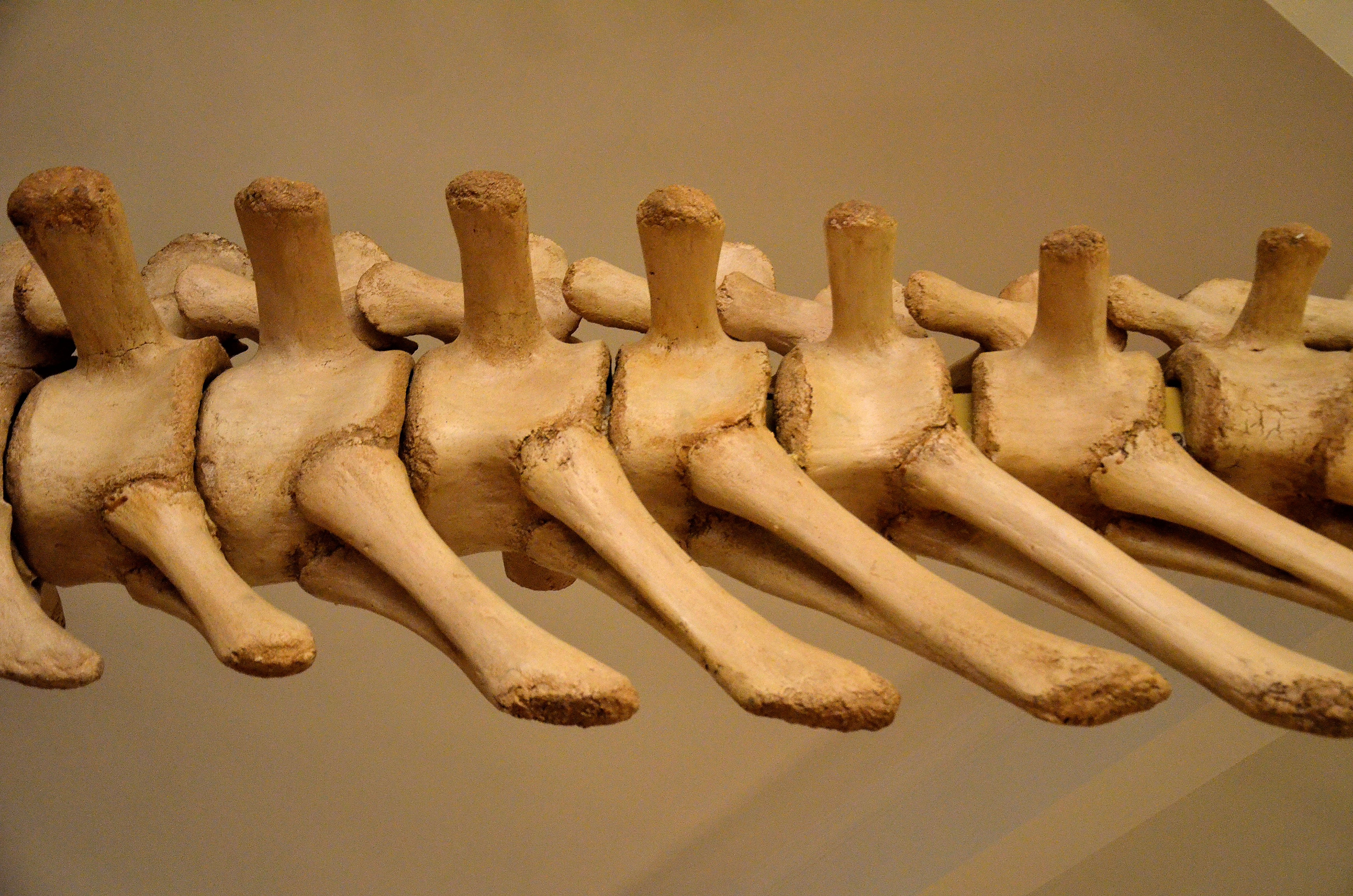
Latero-ventral view of the opisthocoelous anterior tail vertebrae, which lend Opisthocoelicaudia its name

On the fifth day of fieldwork, Ryszard Gradziński, the geologist of the expedition, found a concretion of well-preserved bones which promised to belong to a fairly complete skeleton. Excavation starting the next day revealed a nearly complete skeleton lacking only the head and neck. Until today, this specimen remains by far the most complete finding of this dinosaur. The transport of the specimen out of rough terrain caused major technical problems. Stone blocks containing the fossils had to be moved some 580 meters, dragged on improvised metal sledges made out of petrol drums, before they could be loaded onto trucks. Because the skeleton was embedded in very hard sandstone layers, several blocks weighed over a ton. On July 9, the packing of the skeleton into 35 crates started for transportation to Dalanzadgad; together, the crates weighed about 12 tons.

The type specimen belonged to an aged individual. Its taphonomy is unusual as it was found lying on its back – in contrast, most other nearly complete dinosaur skeletons of the Nemegt Formation usually are found lying on their sides. The specimen was found encased in cross-bedded sandstone deposited by a river. Most of the discovered vertebrae were still connected together, forming a continuous series of eight dorsal, six sacral and thirty-four caudal vertebrae. An additional three vertebrae were found isolated from the series and may belong to the transitional area between back and neck. The remaining parts of the skeleton were shifted slightly out of their original anatomical position. Both the left limb and rib bones were found on the right side of the body, while conversely the right limb and rib bones were found on the left side. Bite marks have been identified on the skeleton, particularly in the pelvis and the thigh bone, showing that predators had fed on the carcass. The skull and neck are missing, indicating that the carnivores might have carried away these body parts. The completeness of the remains indicate that the individual had died near the discovery site. A flooding event might have transported the carcass a short distance and subsequently covered it with sediment, even before the soft tissue had decayed entirely.

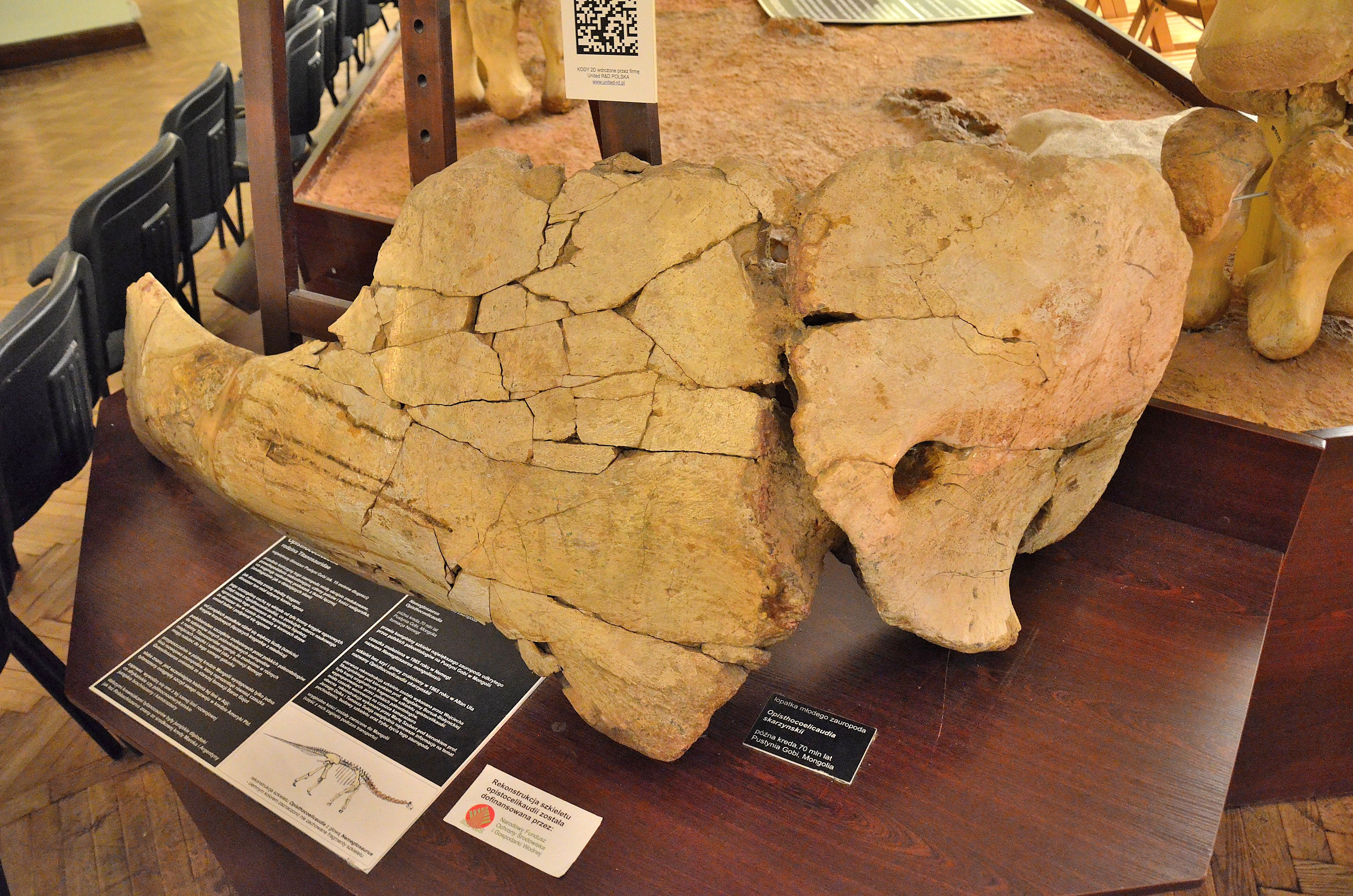
Shoulder blade and coracoid of a juvenile (ZPAL MgD-I/25c)

In 1977, Polish paleontologist Maria Magdalena Borsuk-Białynicka published her comprehensive description of the skeleton and named Opisthocoelicaudia skarzynskii as a new genus and species. The genus name, hinting at the unusual opisthocoel condition of the tail vertebrae, means "posterior cavity tail". It is derived from the Greek ὄπισθεν, opisthen [behind, at the back], κοῖλος, koilos [hollow], and Latin cauda [tail]. The specific name honors Wojciech Skarżyński, the person who prepared the type specimen. Opisthocoelicaudia was only the third sauropod from Asia known from a postcranial skeleton, after Euhelopus and Mamenchisaurus. After its discovery, the holotype skeleton became part of the collection of the Institute of Paleobiology in Warsaw, but later was handed back to its country of origin, now being housed at the Institute of Geology of the Mongolian Academy of Sciences in Ulaanbaatar under the catalog number MPC-D100/404. Besides the type specimen, Borsuk-Białynicka described a shoulder blade and coracoid (ZPAL MgD-I/25c) from the same locality. These bones were not yet fused to each other, indicating a juvenile individual.

By 2017, sauropod fossils had been recovered from a total of 32 localities within the Nemegt Formation, and possibly belong to either Opisthocoelicaudia or Nemegtosaurus. At least two finds from the Nemegt locality – a fragmentary tail (MPD 100/406) and a pair of claws – show features diagnostic for Opisthocoelicaudia and can be referred to the latter. Field crews led by Philip Currie attempted to relocate the Opisthocoelicaudia holotype quarry in 2006 and 2008, but became successful only in 2009 thanks to additional data provided by Gradziński. Although a prospection for additional bone material was not possible as the quarry had been filled by windblown sand, the quarry could be determined to fall within the lower portion of the Nemegt Formation.

== Description ==
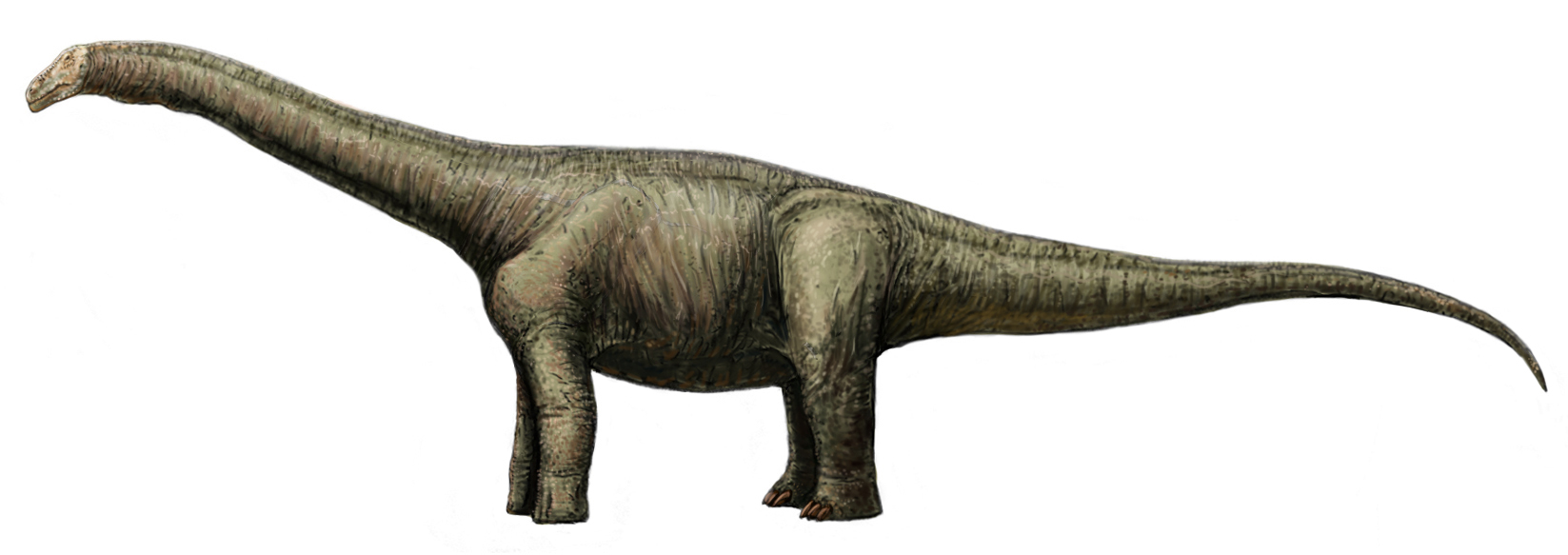
Life restoration

Size diagram

Like other sauropods, Opisthocoelicaudia had a small head on a long neck, a barrel-shaped body on four columnar limbs, and a long tail. It was relatively small for a sauropod; the type specimen was estimated at 11.4 m (37 ft) to 13 m (43 ft) from the head to the tip of the tail. The body mass has been estimated at 8.4 t (19,000 lb), 10.5 t (23,000 lb), 22 t (49,000 lb), 13 t (29,000 lb) and 25.4 t (56,000 lb) in separate studies.

The skull and neck are not preserved, but the reconstruction of the nuchal ligament indicates the possession of a neck of medium length of roughly 5 m (16 ft). Borsuk-Białynicka, in her 1977 description, noted the presence of eleven dorsal vertebrae. Gregory Paul in 2019, however, argued that the known part of the vertebral column actually includes the first cervical (neck vertebra), leaving only ten dorsals, typical of titanosaurs. As in other titanosaurs, the back was quite flexible due to the lack of accessory vertebral joints (hyposphene-hypantrum articulations), while the pelvic region was strengthened by an additional sixth hip vertebra. The anterior vertebrae of the tail were opisthocoelous, which means they were convex on their anterior sides and concave on their back sides, forming ball-and-socket joints. These opisthocoelous tail vertebrae lend Opisthocoelicaudia its name and serve to distinguish the genus from all other titanosaurs. Other titanosaurs were usually characterised by strongly procoelous anterior tail vertebrae, which were concave on their anterior sides and convex on their back sides. Another unique feature can be found in the back vertebrae, which show bifurcated spinous processes, resulting in a double row of bony projections along the top of the spine. While unique in titanosaurs, this feature can be found in several other unrelated sauropods, including Diplodocus and Euhelopus, where it evolved independently.

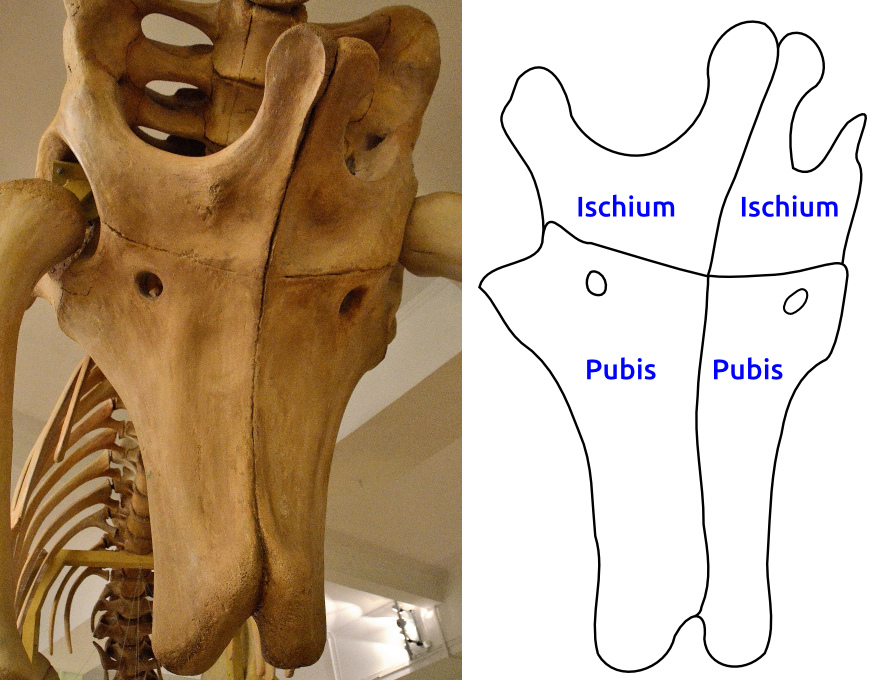
The ischium and pubis bones. The gap normally present between these bones is closed, a characteristic of Opisthocoelicaudia.

As in the hips of other titanosaurs, the ischium was relatively short, measuring only two-thirds the length of the pubis. The left and right ischium bones as well as the left and right pubis bones were ossified with each other over most of their length, closing the gap that in other sauropods is normally present between these bones. The limbs were proportionally short, as seen in other titanosaurs. The forelimbs measured 1.87 m (6.1 ft) in height in the nearly complete specimen, approximately two thirds the length of the hindlimbs, which were reconstructed at 2.46 m (8.1 ft) height. As in other titanosaurs, the limbs were slightly spread outwards rather than standing vertically under the body, while the forelimbs were more flexible and mobile compared to other sauropods.

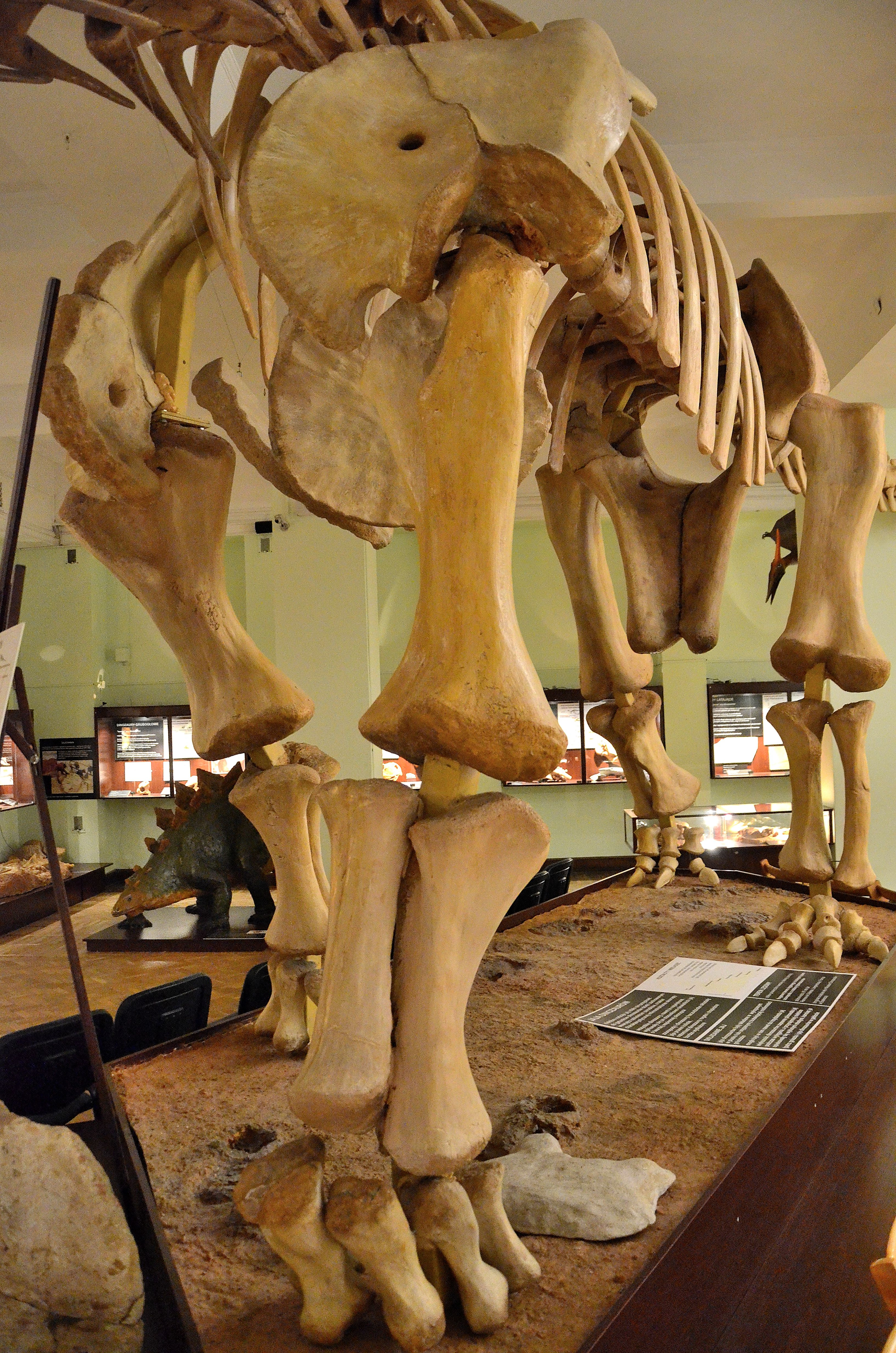
Limbs of Opisthocoelicaudia, showing the digit-less semicircular hands and the fully developed feet

The manus was composed merely of the five metacarpalia, which were orientated vertically and arranged in a semicircle. Carpal bones were missing, as in other titanosaurs. Finger bones and claws were also completely absent – in most other titanosaurs, these bones were still present though extremely reduced in size. In the foot, the talus bone was strongly reduced as in other titanosaurs, while the calcaneus was probably completely absent in Opisthocoelicaudia. In contrast to the manus, the foot showed well developed digits and claws. The phalangeal formula, which states the number of phalanges (digit bones) beginning with the innermost digit, is 2-2-2-1-0. Foot skeletons of titanosaurs are rarely found, and besides Opisthocoelicaudia, completely preserved examples are known only from Epachthosaurus and the unnamed La Invernada titanosaur, whose phalangeal formulas are 2-2-3-2-0 and 2-2-2-2-0, respectively. Of these three titanosaurs, Opisthocoelicaudia was the most derived while showing the fewest phalanges, indicating a progressive reduction in the phalangeal count during titanosaur evolution. The claw of the first digit was not larger than that of the second digit, as in other sauropods, but roughly equal in size.

Osteoderms (bony plates formed in the skin) have been found with at least 10 titanosaur genera. The lack of osteoderms in the nearly complete Opisthocoelicaudia skeleton might indicate they are absent in this genus. However, the closely related Alamosaurus was found to have osteoderms nearly a century after its discovery, in addition to several other closely related titanosaurs, thus raising the possibility that Opisthocoelicaudia had them as well.

== Classification ==
Originally, Opisthocoelicaudia was classified as a member of the family Camarasauridae, together with Camarasaurus and Euhelopus. This classification was based on several shared features of the skeleton, most importantly the forked neural spines of the back vertebrae. In 1977, Borsuk-Białynicka considered Opisthocoelicaudia closer to Euhelopus than to Camarasaurus, placing it in the subfamily Euhelopodinae. A 1981 study by Walter Coombs and Ralph Molnar, on the other hand, considered it a member of the subfamily Camarasaurinae and therefore a close relative of Camarasaurus. Today, both Euhelopus and Opisthocoelicaudia are classified outside the Camarasauridae. In 1993, Leonardo Salgado and Rodolfo Coria showed Opisthocoelicaudia to represent a titanosaur and classified it within the family Titanosauridae. The name Titanosauridae is currently considered invalid by many scientists; instead, the name Lithostrotia is often used as an equivalent.

Within the Lithostrotia, Opisthocoelicaudia has been found to be closely related to the genera Alamosaurus, Neuquensaurus, Rocasaurus and Saltasaurus, together forming the family Saltasauridae. Interrelationships of these genera are contested. Many scientists considered Opisthocoelicaudia to be most closely related to Alamosaurus, with both genera forming a monophyletic group, the Opisthocoelicaudiinae. Other scientists concluded that the Opisthocoelicaudiinae is paraphyletic (not forming a natural group). Contradicting most other studies, Upchurch and colleagues in 2004 argued that Alamosaurus has to be placed outside the Saltasauridae as a close relative of Pellegrinisaurus, and therefore is not related to Opisthocoelicaudia at all.

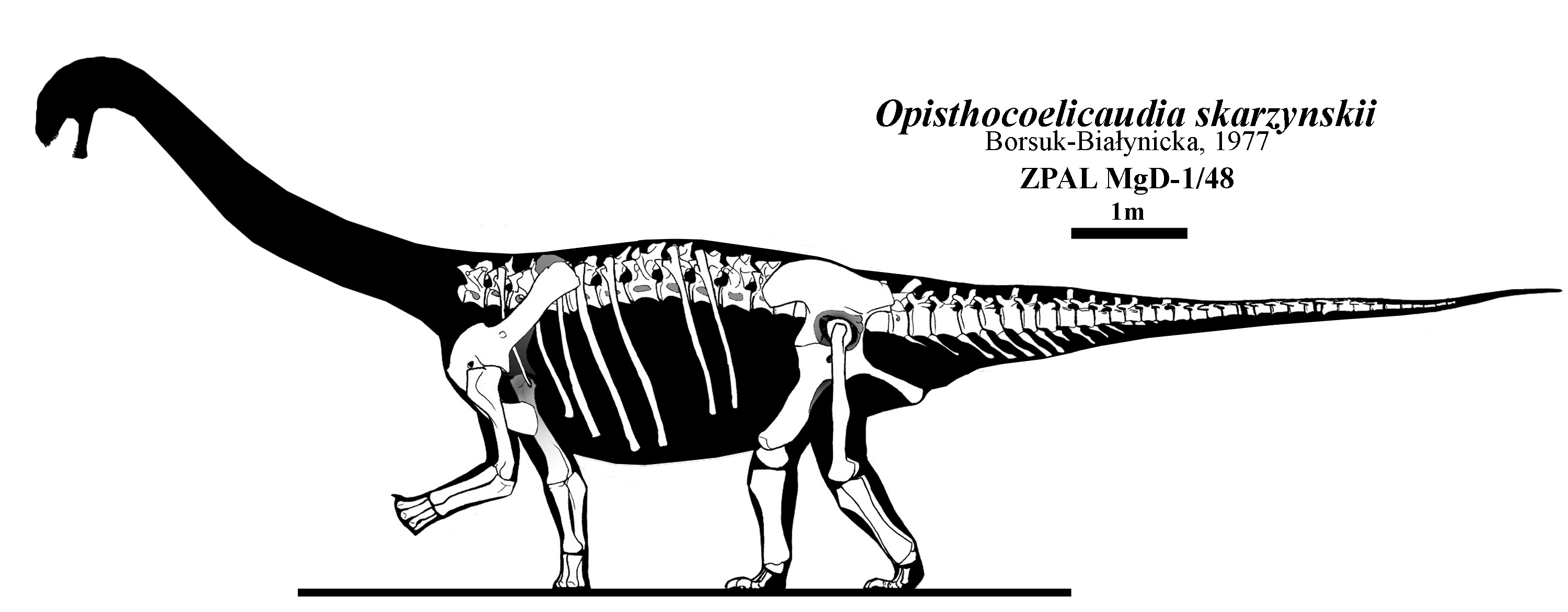
Skeletal drawing showing elements of the type specimen

This cladogram, based on Calvo and colleagues (2007), shows a monophyletic Opisthocoelicaudiinae:

- Saltasauridae
  - Opisthocoelicaudiinae
    - Opisthocoelicaudia
    - Alamosaurus
  - Saltasaurinae
    - Neuquensaurus
    - - Rocasaurus
      - Saltasaurus

Opisthocoelicaudia in a cladogram after Navarro et al., 2022:

- Saltasauridae
  - Opisthocoelicaudiinae
    - Opisthocoelicaudia
    - Nemegtosaurus
  - Saltasaurinae
    - - Alamosaurus
      - Baurutitan
    - - - Ibirania
        - - Bonatitan
          - Rocasaurus
      - Saltasaurini
        - Neuquensaurus
        - - MACN-PV-RN 233
          - Saltasaurus

=== Relationship to Nemegtosaurus ===
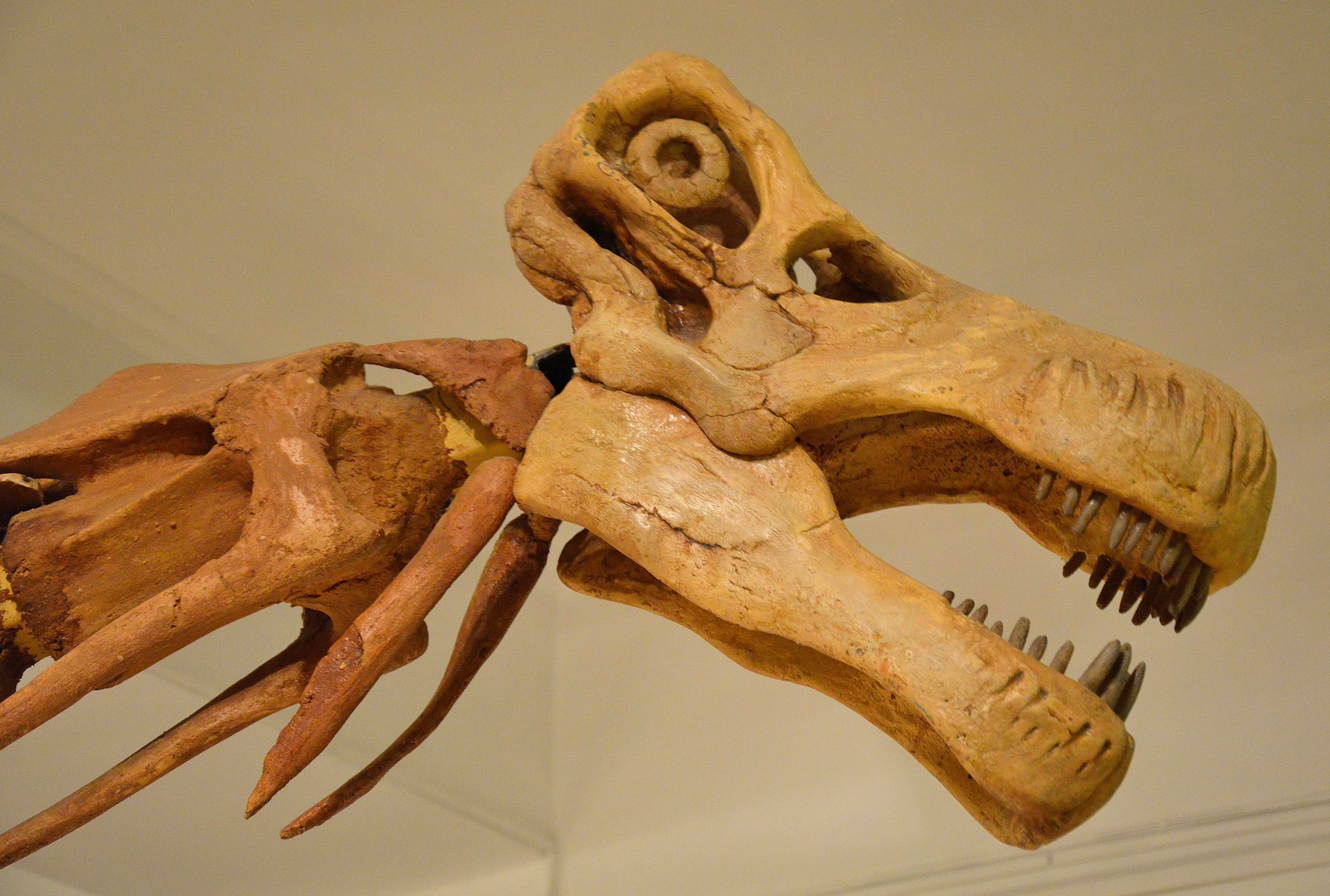
Cast of the skull of Nemegtosaurus, a possible senior synonym, mounted on the Opisthocoelicaudia skeletal restoration in Warsaw

Another sauropod of the Nemegt-Formation, Nemegtosaurus, is known only from a skull. Opisthocoelicaudia, on the other hand, lacks both the skull and neck, precluding a direct comparison and leading to suspicions that it may represent a synonym of Nemegtosaurus. According to the International Code of Zoological Nomenclature (ICZN), the oldest name has priority over younger synonyms – if Opisthocoelicaudia would be shown to be a synonym of Nemegtosaurus, the name Nemegtosaurus would remain valid while Opisthocoelicaudia would become invalid.

Both Opisthocoelicaudia and Nemegtosaurus were discovered during the 1965 joint Polish-Mongolian expedition. Before the remains were prepared and described, the expedition crew believed both finds to belong to the same species of sauropod. In 1977, Borsuk-Białynicka deemed Opisthocoelicaudia and Nemegtosaurus to represent separate genera because Nemegtosaurus was at this time considered to be a member of the Dicraeosauridae, while Opisthocoelicaudia seemed to be a representative of a different group, the Camarasauridae.

Currently, both Opisthocoelicaudia and Nemegtosaurus are classified within the Titanosauria, and Jeffrey Wilson stated in 2005 that synonymy cannot be ruled out. Currie and colleagues, in 2003 and 2017, argued that a synonymy is very probable in the light of new fossil discoveries in the Nemegt Formation. After relocating the original Nemegtosaurus quarry, these researchers excavated postcranial bones of the Nemegtosaurus holotype including the centrum of a caudal vertebra and hind limb bones, which allowed, for the first time, a direct comparison between the Nemegtosaurus and Opisthocoelicaudia type specimens based on overlapping elements. These postcranial elements were found to be very similar to the corresponding parts of the Opisthocoelicaudia holotype. Most importantly, the discovered caudal centrum is opisthocoelous – a diagnostic feature of Opisthocoelicaudia – suggesting both genera were either closely related or synonymous. Furthermore, these authors noted that none of the 32 known sauropod localities of the Nemegt Formation revealed evidence for the presence of more than one species of sauropod. In 2019, Alexander O. Averianov and Alexey V. Lopatin reported Nemegt sauropod vertebrae discovered in 1949 and some femora that differed from the same bones of Opisthocoelicaudia, and stated they probably belonged to Nemegtosaurus, thereby supporting that the two genera were distinct.

In her 1977 description, Borsuk-Białynicka argued that different sauropod genera sharing the same habitat is nothing unusual, as is evident in the North American Morrison Formation. Currie and colleagues, however, stressed in 2018 that the dinosaur fauna of the Nemegt Formation was fundamentally different, as larger dinosaurs were present with only few species per clade, indicating a harsh and geographically restricted habitat. Definitive proof for the suggested synonymy is, however, still missing, and additional overlapping elements would be required before Opisthocoelicaudia and Nemegtosaurus can be formally declared synonyms.

== Paleobiology ==
=== Posture ===
A: Posture based on the 1977 reconstruction by Borsuk-Białynicka with a horizontal back. B: Posture based on the 2007 reconstruction by Schwarz et al. with a much steeper scapula (green) angled 60° towards the horizontal, resulting in a downwards tilting back.

Originally, Borsuk-Białynicka assumed that in standard position the neck was horizontal or slanted slightly downward. This was based on the reconstruction of the nuchal ligament, which runs atop of the cervical and dorsal vertebrae and serves to support the weight of the head and neck. Although an S-curved, swan-like ascending neck was envisaged in several subsequent reconstructions following similar depictions of better known sauropods, recent studies argue that sauropod necks were relatively straight and were carried more horizontally.

The back was also reconstructed in a more or less horizontal orientation by Borsuk-Białynicka, which was followed by most subsequent depictions. In a 2007 study, Daniela Schwarz and colleagues suggested that the back dipped towards the rear. According to these researchers, the shoulder blade would have been inclined at a horizontal angle of 55–65°, much steeper than previously thought, resulting in an elevated shoulder region. With the vertebral column of the trunk and neck held in a relatively straight line, this would result in an elevated position of the head.

=== Rearing stance ===
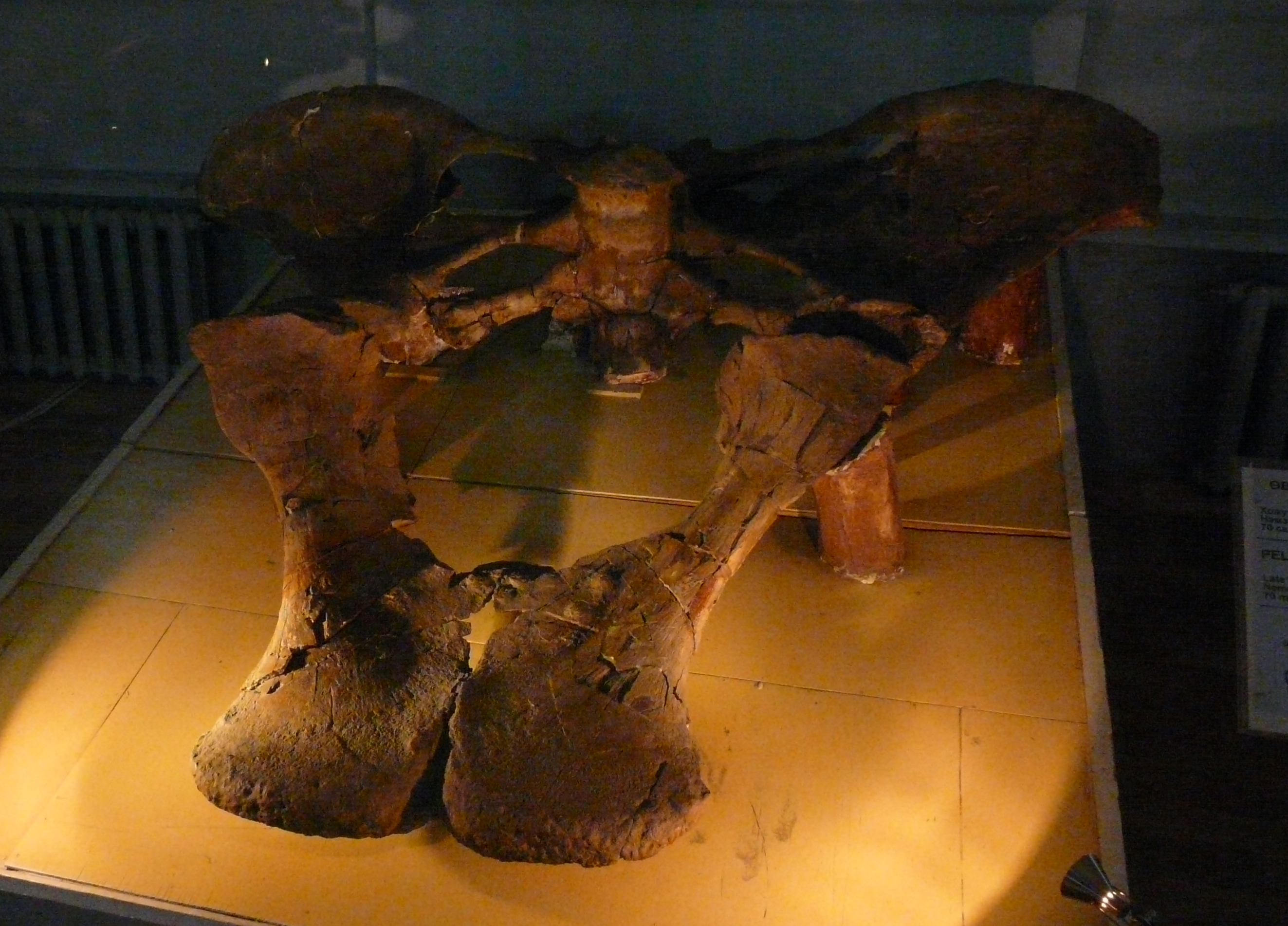
Pelvis of the type specimen

Opisthocoelicaudia may have been able to rear up on its hindlimbs for foraging, using its tail as a third leg. In 1977, Borsuk-Białynicka cited several skeletal features that might have been related to rearing, including the opisthocoelous vertebrae of the anterior part of the tail, which, according to this author, would have made the tail more flexible than in other sauropods. Features of the pelvis, such as the thickened shelf of the acetabulum, the flaring ilia, and the fused pubic symphysis, may have allowed the pelvis to withstand the stress of rearing.

Heinrich Mallison in 2011 argued that Opisthocoelicaudia may have been able to angle the anterior part of the tail against the posterior part, producing a buckle in midsection. Thus, the anterior part would have been more straight during rearing than in other sauropods. In 2005, Wilson assumed that rearing was an innovation not only of Opisthocoelicaudia but also of related genera within the subfamily Saltasaurinae. Common features of these genera, such as the shortened tail, may have evolved as adaptations to rearing.

=== Footprints ===
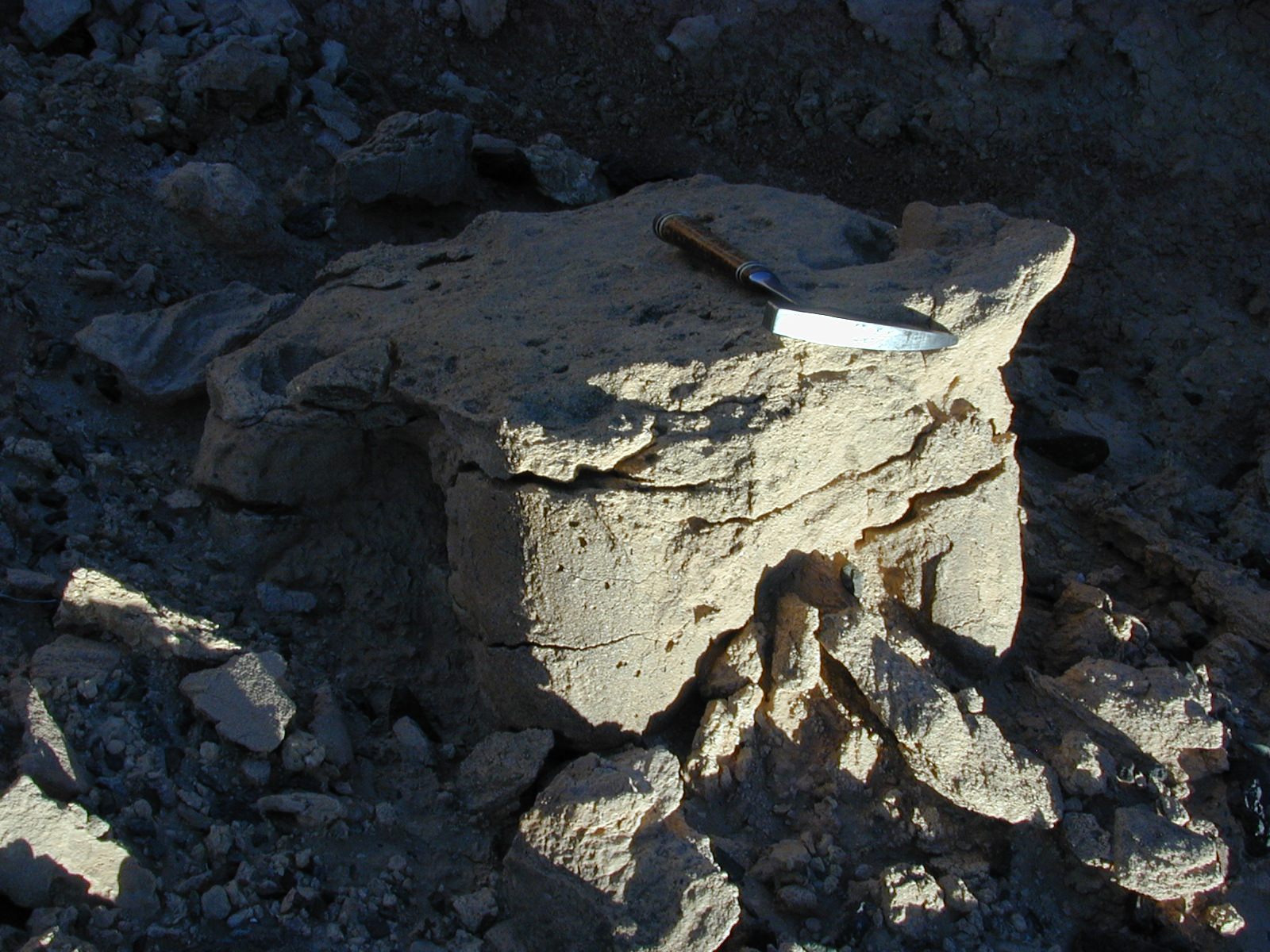
Natural cast of a sauropod hindfoot impression, probably left by Opisthocoelicaudia

Footprints from the Nemegt Formation were unknown until 2003, when several examples had been described from the Nemegt locality by Currie and colleagues. Most of these footprints belonged to hadrosaurids (probably Saurolophus), while two have been left by a large theropod (probably Tarbosaurus) and yet another two by the hindfoot of a sauropod. The sauropod tracks were assigned to Opisthocoelicaudia, which, according to these authors, showed a matching hind foot morphology and was probably the only known sauropod (and, thus, the only potential trackmaker species) from the Nemegt Formation when Nemegtosaurus is regarded a synonym. The tracks were left in the soft and wet mud of shallow or freshly dried up points along a river and subsequently filled up with sand. Today only the sand infill remains, with the encasing mudstone having been eroded away. The best-preserved footprint measures 63 cm (25 in) across, so it was probably created by an individual larger than the type specimen. Although the surface of the underside is hard to obtain, the vertical surfaces are very well preserved, making this track one of the best preserved sauropod tracks known. Four digital impressions can be distinguished, with two or three showing claw impressions. The toes were almost perpendicular. Even a skin impression has been preserved above the impression of the first toe, which shows the non-overlapping scales, each with an average diameter of 14 mm (0.55 in). The foot of the track creator was probably a little longer than wide. The second track is much shallower than the first, but shows well-preserved digit impressions with a high degree of detail, including at least two deep claw impressions that are rotated outwards, and a well-preserved impression of a fleshy toe pad behind the middle claw.

Although number of additional sauropod tracks were reported in subsequent accounts, they continued to be rare in relation to the much more common hadrosaurid and theropod tracks. Brennan Stettner and colleagues, in 2017, reported on footprints discovered during a 2007 expedition to the Nemegt locality. The best preserved of these, a very large, 76 cm (30 in) long impression of a hindfoot, features a very well preserved underside showing digital pads and four outwards directed digits, the first three of which showing claws. Also in 2017, Judai Nakajima and colleagues described a kidney-shaped impression as the first sauropod manus (forefoot) impression discovered in the formation.

== Paleoecology ==
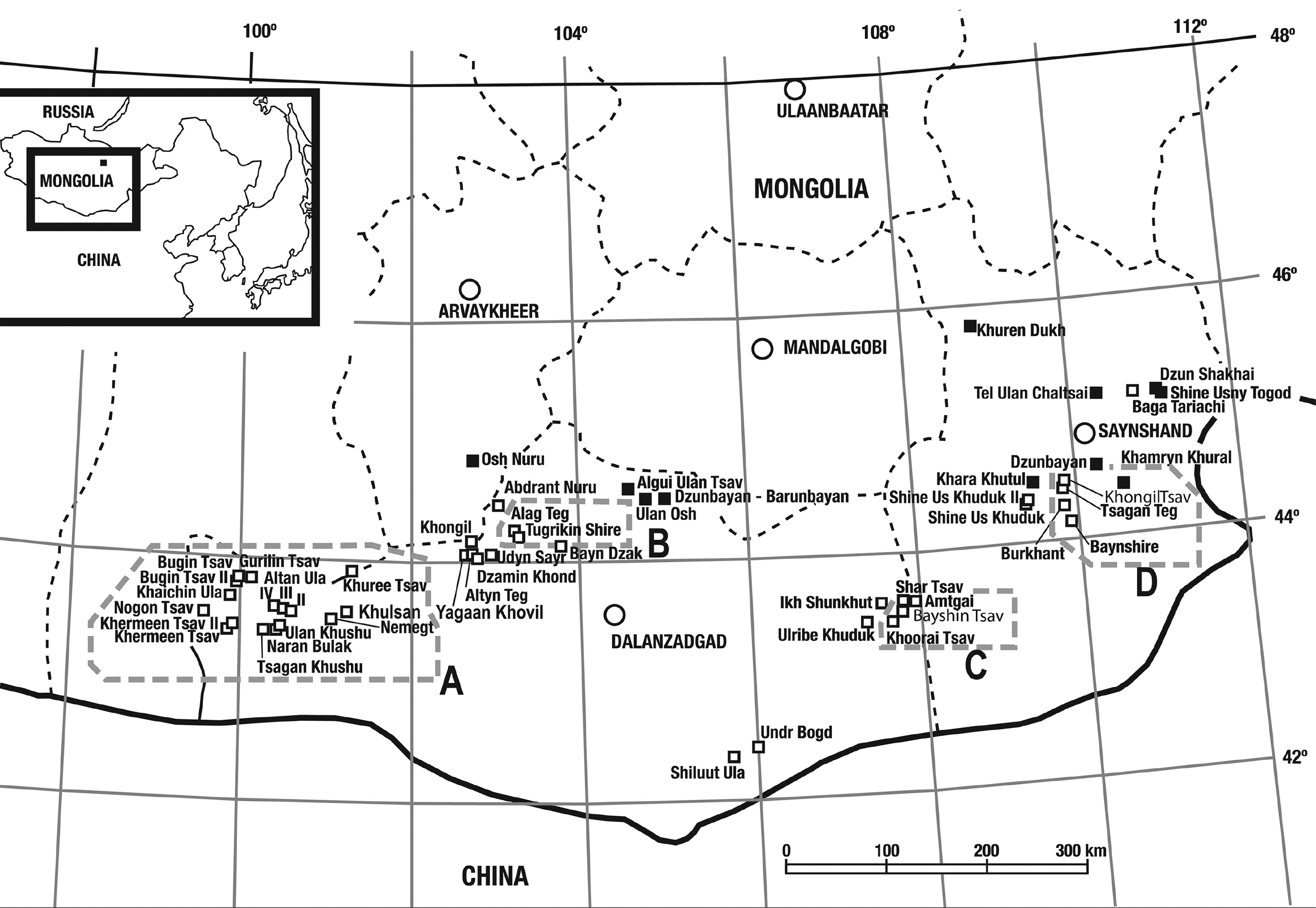
Cretaceous-aged dinosaur fossil localities of Mongolia. Opisthocoelicaudia was collected in Altan Ula within area A (left).

The Nemegt Formation was deposited within the Late Cretaceous, although its exact age is unknown as it has never been dated radiometrically. According to different authors, the formation is late Campanian to early Maastrichtian, early Maastrichtian, or middle Maastrichtian in age. The sediments of the Nemegt Formation were deposited in a plain crossed by rivers. The climate was warm and subhumid with seasonal droughts, and the soils were relatively dry. Nevertheless, the Nemegt Formation was more humid than the underlying (and thus older) Barun Goyot and Djadochta Formations, which show a semiarid climate.

The fauna of the Nemegt Formation includes aquatic or amphibious animals such as fish, turtles, and crocodiles as well as birds and the abundant medium to large sized dinosaurs, while smaller terrestrial vertebrates like lizards and mammals are rare. Theropod dinosaurs are very diverse in the Nemegt and include the abundant tyrannosaur Tarbosaurus, which might have preyed upon Opisthocoelicaudia. The only other known sauropod is Nemegtosaurus, which is known from a single skull. Ornithischians are represented by the "duck-billed" hadrosaurids (including the very common Saurolophus), the thick-skulled pachycephalosaurs, and the heavily armored ankylosaurs. Neoceratopsians are absent, despite being present in the older Barun Goyot and Djadochta formations. Other important dinosaur finds from the same locality as Opisthocoelicaudia include the troodontid Borogovia and the ankylosaur Tarchia.
