= Notosphenos =

Notosphenos Temporal range: Late Cretaceous, Maastrichtian
- Reconstructed skull, depicting the two proposed interpretations of the holotype

Scientific classification
- Kingdom: Animalia
- Phylum: Chordata
- Class: Reptilia
- Order: Rhynchocephalia
- Family: Sphenodontidae
- Subfamily: Sphenodontinae
- Genus: †Notosphenos; Agnolín et al., 2024
- Species: †N. finisterre

Binomial name
- †Notosphenos finisterre Agnolín et al., 2024

Extinct reptile genus

Notosphenos (lit. 'south wedge') is an extinct genus of sphenodontian reptile in the subfamily Sphenodontinae (of which the tuatara is the only living member) known from the Late Cretaceous (Maastrichtian age) Chorrillo Formation of Argentina. The genus contains a single species, Notosphenos finisterre, known from a fragmentary tooth-bearing bone. Originally identified as a partial maxilla (upper jaw bone), later researchers reidentified it as a part of the dentary (lower jaw bone), leading them to question the validity of this taxon. Alongside snake fossils from the same region, this fauna represents the southernmost occurrence of a Mesozoic lepidosaur assemblage.

== Discovery and naming ==
N. finisterre type locality ('Monotreme site') in Santa Cruz Province, Argentina

The Notosphenos fossil material was discovered at the 'Monotreme site' at La Anita farm, representing outcrops of the upper Chorrillo Formation about 30 kilometres (19 mi) southwest of El Calafate in Santa Cruz Province, Argentina. The specimen is accessioned in the vertebrate paleontology collection of the Padre Manuel Jesús Molina Provincial Regional Museum as specimen MPM-PV-23097. It consists of a fragment of a jaw bone bearing two complete teeth and the base of a third, originally identified as the anterior (front) part of the maxilla (bone of the upper jaw).

=== Etymology ===
In 2024, Federico Agnolín and colleagues described Notosphenos finisterre as a new genus and species of derived sphenodonian based on these fossil remains, designating MPM-PV-23097 as the holotype specimen. The generic name, Notosphenos, is derived from the Greek words νότος (nótos), meaning 'south', and σφήν (sphḗn), meaning 'wedge'. This suffix alludes to its close relationship with the modern tuatara—which bears the genus name Sphenodon (lit. 'wedge tooth')—and its fossil relatives. The specific name, finisterre, is derived from the Latin phrase finis terrae, which refers to the 'end of the earth'.

=== Reidentification ===
Shortly after the description of Notosphenos (which also described several isolated snake vertebrae), Fernando F. Garberoglio and colleagues (2024) published a comment on this work, critically revising the interpretations of Agnolín et al. Based on a groove on the side of the bone (identified as the Meckelian groove) and the wear pattern on one of the teeth, they reinterpreted the holotype 'maxilla' as actually being a posterior (rear) part of the right dentary (bone of the lower jaw). Agnolín et al. had commented on the notable straightness of the bone and the absence of foramina or ornamentation on the labial surface (toward the lips), assuming a maxilla identity. However, this would be unsurprising if the element is actually the dentary, as the rear portion is straight and the 'labial' surface—which would now be the lingual (toward the tongue) surface—would not be expected to have foramina. Furthermore, Garberoglio et al. identified foramina on the labial surface of the dentary (the lingual surface of the maxilla according to Agnolín et al.), supporting this orientation of the bone. Following their reinterpretation of this bone, Garberoglio et al. noted that the supposed distinct features of the 'maxilla' were no longer usable to distinguish it from other sphenodontines, rendering Notosphenos a nomen dubium. In a subsequent reply to Garberoglio et al., Agnolín and colleagues acknowledged the possibility that the bone may be a dentary, but maintained the validity of Notosphenos as a distinct taxon based on anatomical differences and the clear geographic and stratigraphic separation from other sphenodontines.

== Description ==
Notosphenos is regarded as a small member of the sphenodontian clade Sphenodontinae. A classification within this subfamily is agreed upon by both the Agnolín and Garberoglio research teams based on the acrodont tooth placement, the tooth shape, and the rectangular wear pattern on the small teeth. The teeth are relatively low and conical in shape, with narrow bases and smooth crowns. They exhibit wear facets, and the tips are rounded. The teeth are more robust than the extant Sphenodon, with wider bases and thicker enamel. Agnolín et al. described the larger of the two complete teeth as 'caniniform' in morphology, a condition rejected by Garberoglio et al. based on the lack of wear on the medial (inner) surface and the similar size of the base of this tooth in relation to that of the third tooth. The former research group, assuming the bone to be part of the maxilla, regarded the teeth to be 'well-separated', which would clearly distinguish it from Sphenodon, which has more closely-spaced teeth. However, the latter group, considering the bone to be part of the dentary, noted that this is the expected condition is the mid-lower jaw of Sphenodon and other extinct relatives (i.e., Tika and Kawasphenodon), though it can vary along the toothrow and through ontogeny (development).

== Paleoenvironment ==
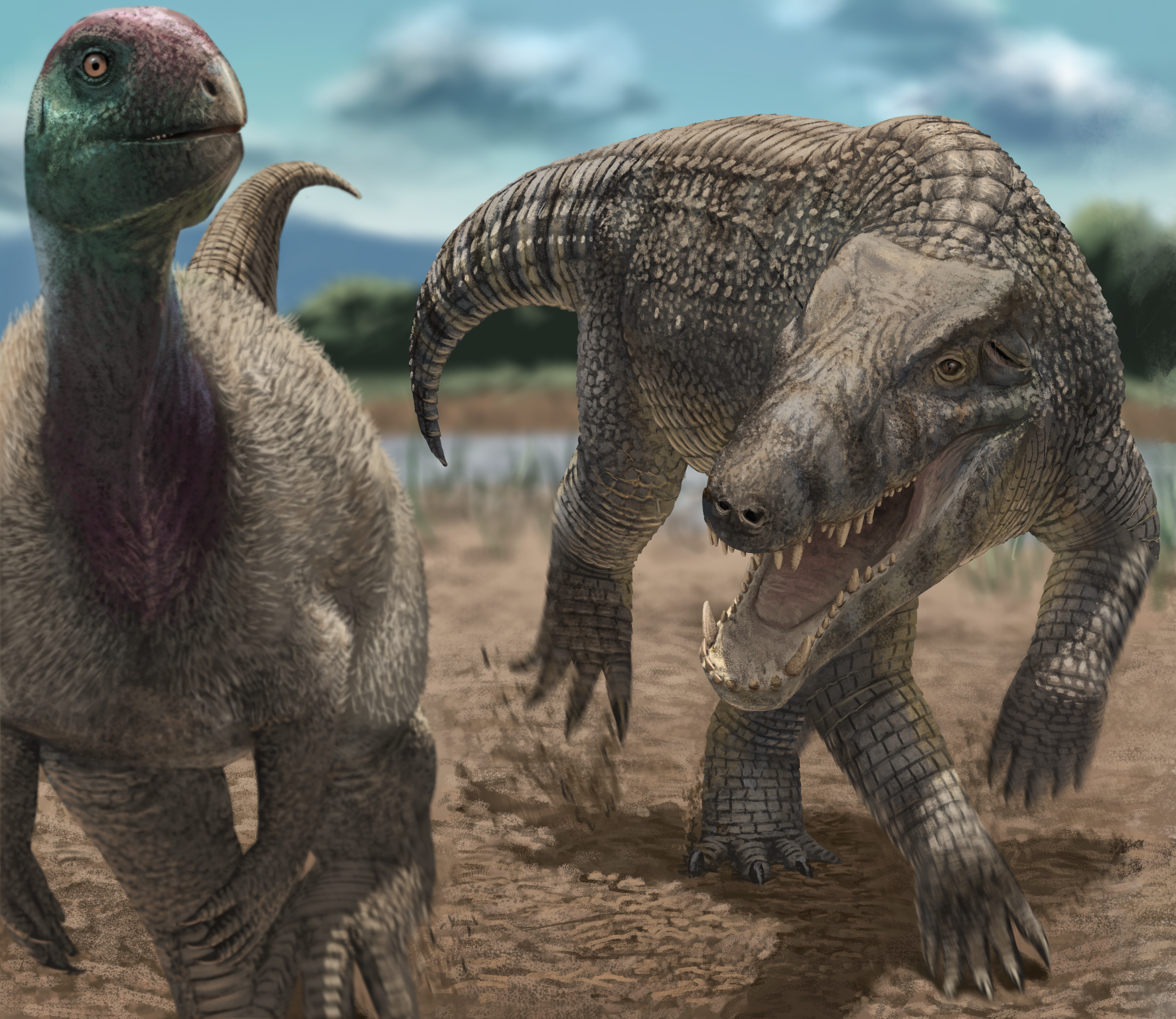
Life restoration of Kostensuchus and Isasicursor, two components of the Chorrillo Formation fauna

Notosphenos is known from the Chorrillo Formation, which dates to the Maastrichtian age of the late Cretaceous period. At that time, this freshwater-influenced terrestrial region likely had humid conditions in a warm-to-temperate climate. As demonstrated by fossil pollen, an 'intermixed flora' with ferns, conifers, and angiosperms was present and is characterized by the presence of palms, Proteaceae shrubs, and Nothofagaceae.

Other lepidosaurs from this formation include several snakes known from isolated vertebrae, such as Rionegrophis and unnamed specimens of madtsoiids, 'anilioids', and a Coniophis-like taxon. Alongside Notosphenos, this fauna comprises the most southerly Mesozoic assemblage of lepidosaurs. Other herpetofauna from the Chorrillo Formation includes various frogs (calyptocephalellids and pipoids), turtles (chelids and meiolaniforms), and a crocodylomorph (Kostensuchus, a peirosaurid). Marine reptiles include an indeterminate mosasaurid and elasmosaurid plesiosaur, which would have coexisted with lamniform (shark) and amiid (bowfin) fishes, which are also known from fragmentary remains. Various birds (including the ornithuran Kookne and the enantiornithean Yatenavis) and mammals (including Magallanodon, Patagomaia, and Patagorhynchus) are also known. Dinosaurs named from the Chorrillo Formation include the theropods Kank (a unenlagiid) and Maip (a megaraptorid), the sauropod Nullotitan (a titanosaur), and the ornithischian Isasicursor (an elasmarian), in addition to an unnamed noasaurid, hadrosaurid, and parankylosaur.
