= Chorrillo Formation =

Geologic formation in Patagonia, Argentina

- Stratigraphic range: Late Cretaceous, Maastrichtian
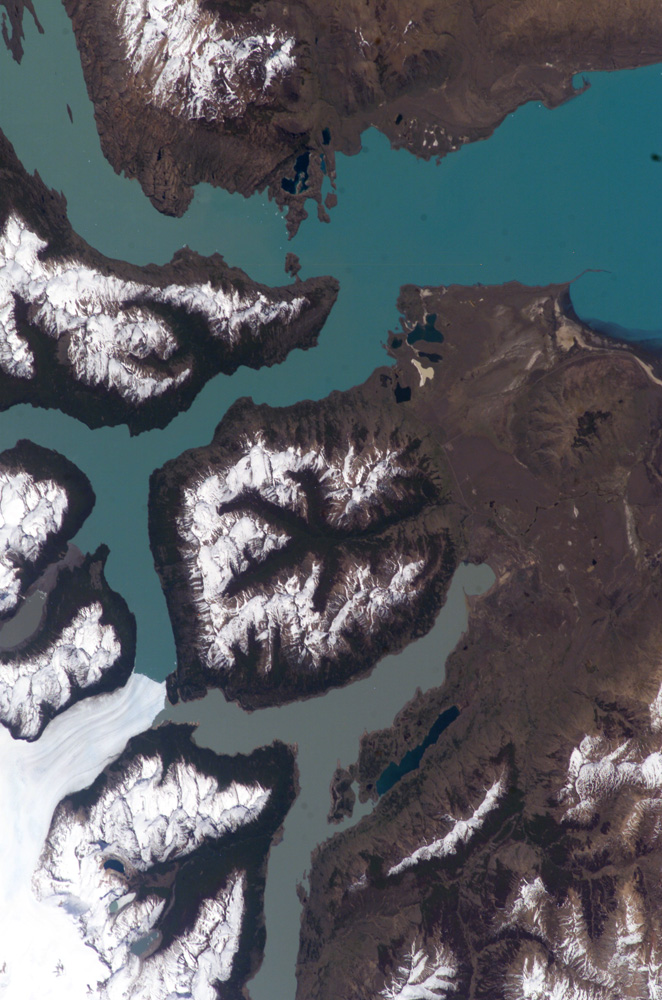
- Satellite image of the Chorrillo Formation site (in the middle on the right). At the bottom left is the Perito Moreno Glacier.
- Type: Geological formation
- Underlies: Calafate Formation
- Overlies: La Irene Formation
- Thickness: >50 m (160 ft)

Lithology
- Primary: Claystone

Location
- Location: Patagonia
- Coordinates: 49.9°S 72.5°W
- Approximate paleocoordinates: 51.8°S 62.2°W
- Region: Santa Cruz Province
- Country: Argentina
- Extent: Southeast of Viedma Lake; North of Argentino Lake; Austral Basin

Type section
- Named by: Arbe & Hechem
- Year defined: 1984
- Chorrillo Formation (Argentina)

The Chorrillo Formation, also called the Chorillo Formation, is a Late Cretaceous (Maastrichtian age) geological formation in southern Patagonia, Argentina. The formation is more than 50 metres (160 ft) thick and underlies the Calafate Formation and rests on top of the La Irene Formation. It constitutes a significant uppermost Cretaceous continental sedimentary sequence within the Magallanes Basin, located in Santa Cruz Province, Argentina, approximately 30 km (19 mi) southwest of El Calafate. Initial investigations in the 1990s laid the groundwork, with detailed paleontological studies emerging since 2019, revealing a rich biotic assemblage. The formation correlates with the lower Dorotea Formation in Chile, sharing dinosaurian ecotypes, while both are clearly different from other northern Patagonian Maastrichtian units (e.g., Allen Formation, Los Alamitos Formation), which are dominated by saltasaurine sauropods and abelisaurids, suggesting potential temporal or environmental distinctions.

== Geology ==
The Chorrillo Formation is embedded within the foreland Magallanes Basin, shaped by Late Cretaceous Andean orogeny driven by subduction along the Pacific margin. Tectonic subsidence, coupled with sediment supply from the rising Patagonian Andes, facilitated deposition. Lithologically, the unit comprises fine- to coarse-grained clastics: mudstones and siltstones dominate floodplain facies, often organic-rich and pedogenically modified; sandstones, arkosic to lithic, form channel fills with cross-bedding; and conglomerates appear as basal lags. Clay mineralogy is dominated by smectite, with minor illite and kaolinite, reflecting volcanic ash alteration. Sedimentologically, it records a meandering fluvial system on a distal floodplain, featuring fining-upward channel sequences, crevasse splays, and overbank deposits. High-frequency paleosol stacking indicates local hydrologic and topographic variability, while low-frequency patterns suggest avulsion-driven progradation. Regional ties extend to the Dorotea Formation in Chile, reflecting basin-wide tectonic influences.

== Paleoenvironment ==
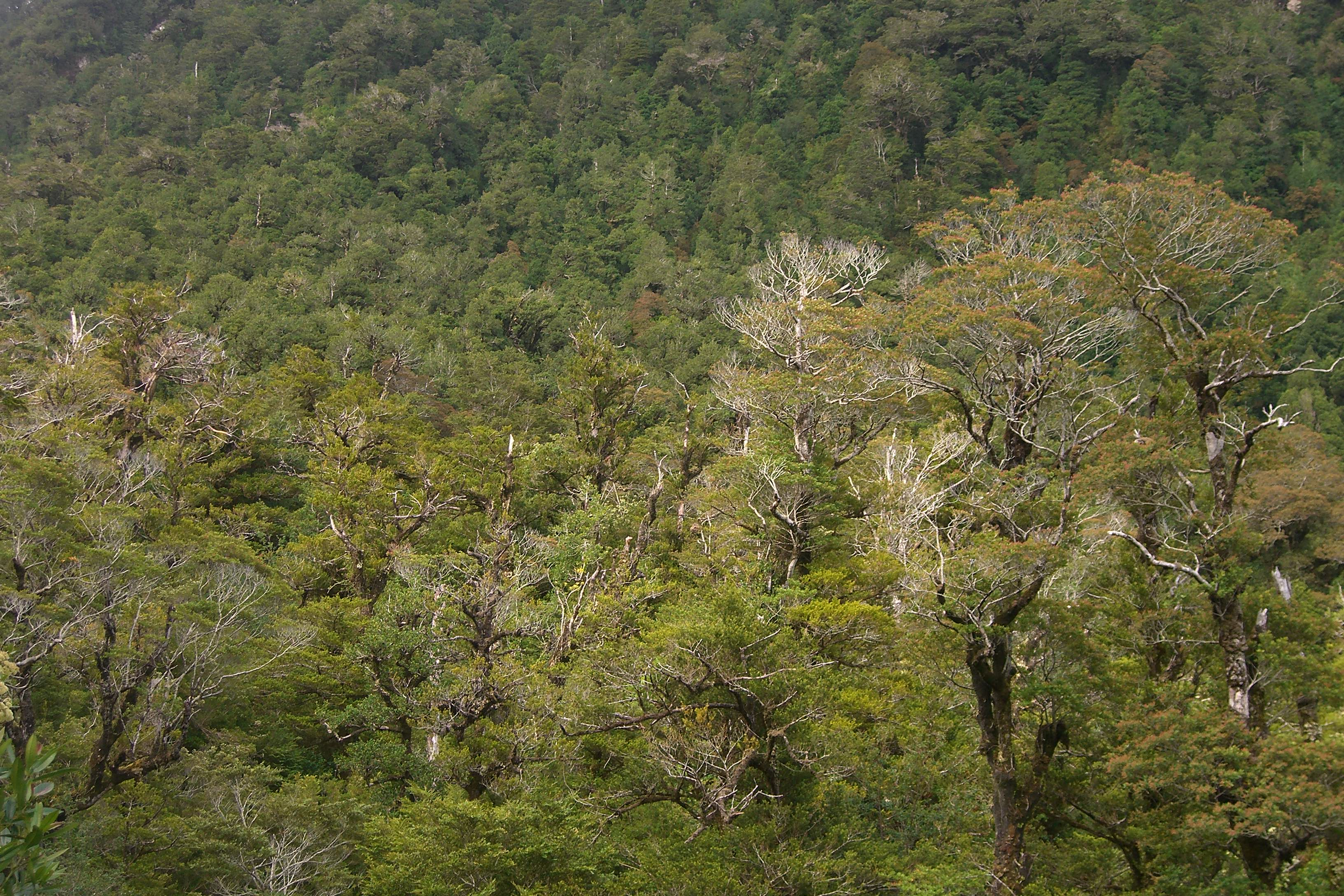
Modern equivalent, Valdivian Rainforest

Paleoenvironmental reconstructions indicate a temperate and humid subtropical climate with marked seasonality in rainfall. Mean annual temperatures were 12.1-14.5 °C with mean annual precipitation of 929–1321 mm, inferred from paleosols, clay mineralogy, and biotic indicators. Depositional settings encompass low-energy fluvial floodplains with paludal and lacustrine elements, marked by poor drainage, hydromorphic paleosols (e.g., vertisols, histosols), and redoximorphic features such as mottling and iron nodules, suggesting fluctuating water tables and episodic anoxia. Aquatic communities feature Nymphaeaceae, Salviniaceae, and Zygnemataceae, indicative of freshwater ponds and swamps, while terrestrial elements include conifers, ferns, and angiosperms in riparian zones. Floral phytozones, derived from palynological data, comprise five assemblages across the section, exhibiting quantitative variations in taxa proportions without major turnover: lower zones are fern-dominated (e.g., Cyatheaceae), transitioning to angiosperm-rich upper zones (e.g., Proteaceae, Nothofagidites), attributed to subtle humidity fluctuations or habitat gradients relative to fluvial channels. These patterns align with Maastrichtian assemblages in southern Gondwanan basins (e.g., La Anita, Lefipán Formation), reflecting angiosperm diversification and Weddellian Province expansion.

== Fossils ==
Color key: Taxon / Reclassified taxon / Taxon falsely reported as present / Dubious taxon or junior synonym / Ichnotaxon / Ootaxon / Morphotaxon

Notes
Uncertain or tentative taxa are in small text
~~crossed out~~ taxa are discredited.

=== Arthropoda ===
==== Decapoda ====
Genus	Species	Locality	Material	Notes	Images
Astacidea indet.	Indeterminate	Locality 4	MPM 21516, three gastroliths	Previously identified as crushing fish teeth	Extant example

==== Insects ====
Genus	Species	Locality	Material	Notes	Images
Coelolepida indet.	Indeterminate	La Anita farm	MPM-Pal 21835-3:W34/1; MPM-Pal 21835-23:W55/0; MPM-Pal 21835-22:R52/2; MPM-Pal 21835-20:Z47/3; MPM-Pal 21835-22: G55/0; MPM-Pal 2183-21: E42/3	A glossatan lepidopteran	
Diamesinae indet.	"Morphotype 3"	La Anita farm	MPM-Pal 21835-9:E34/4; MPM-Pal 21835-19: V34/4	A chironomid cematoceran. Similar to the living genus Paraheptagyia.	Extant example
Ephemeroptera indet.	Indeterminate	La Anita farm	MPM-Pal 21835-9:W37/1	A mayfly	
Lepidoptera indet.	Indeterminate	La Anita farm	MPM-Pal 21835-10:X30/2; MPM-Pal 21835-7:S27/2		
Orthocladiinae indet.	"Morphotype 1"	La Anita farm	MPM-Pal 21835-24: M31/0; MPM-Pal 21835-3: P46/4	A chironomid nematoceran	
Orthocladiinae indet.	"Morphotype 2"	La Anita farm	MPM-Pal 21835-25: V26/3	A chironomid nematoceran	
Orthocladiinae indet.	"Morphotype 5"	La Anita farm	MPM-Pal 21835-9: Q58/3	It resembles modern Cricotopus	Extant Cricotopus
Tanypodinae indet.	"Morphotype 4"	La Anita farm	MPM-Pal 21835-2:Y40/3	A chironomid nematoceran	Extant example

=== Molluscs ===
==== Gastropods ====
Genus	Species	Locality	Material	Notes	Images
Allopeas	A. agnolini	Locality 4	Shells	An achatinid gastropod	Extant specimen
Bocourtia	B. leonardodavincii	Locality 4	Shells	A bulimulid gastropod	Extant specimen
Coelostemma	C. patagonica	Locality 4	Shells	A holospirid gastropod	
Holospira	H. sp.	Locality 4	Shells	An urocoptidae gastropod	
Leptinaria	Cf.L. sp.	Locality 4	Shells	An achatinid gastropod	Extant specimen
Lilloiconcha	L. novasi	Locality 4	Shells	A charopid gastropod	
Naesiotus	Cf.N. sp.	Locality 4	Shells	A bulimulid gastropod	Extant specimen
Physa	P. sp.	Locality 4	Shells	A physidae gastropod	Extant specimen
Physella	Cf.P. sp.	Locality 4	Shells	A physidae gastropod	Extant specimen
Pleuroceridae indet.	Indeterminate	Locality 4	Shells	Incertade sedis	
Pomacea	P. sp.	Locality 4	Shells	An ampullariidae gastropod	Extant specimen
Potamolithus	P. fabiani	Locality 4	Shells	A tateid gastropod	Extant specimen
Stenophysa	S. sp.	Locality 4	Shells	A physidae gastropod	

==== Bivalves ====
Color key: Taxon / Reclassified taxon / Taxon falsely reported as present / Dubious taxon or junior synonym / Ichnotaxon / Ootaxon / Morphotaxon

Notes
Uncertain or tentative taxa are in small text
~~crossed out~~ taxa are discredited.

Genus	Species	Locality	Material	Notes	Images
Chlamys	"C." salamanca	Locality 5	Shells	A pectinid bivalve	Extant specimen
Cubitostrea	C. ameghinoi	Locality 5	Shells	An ostreid bivalve	Extant specimen
Gryphaeostrea	G. callophyla	Locality 5	Shells	A gryphaeid bivalve	

=== Fishes ===
Genus	Species	Locality	Material	Notes	Images
Lamniformes indet.	Indeterminate	Locality 5	Isolated upper lateral tooth	Similar to Cretalamna	
Vidalamiinae indet.	Indeterminate	Locality 2	Isolated tooth	An amiid fish	

=== Amphibians ===
Genus	Species	Locality	Material	Notes	Images
Anura indet.	Indeterminate	Locality 4	MPM 21518, isolated tibiofibula		
Calyptocephalella	C. gayi	Locality 2	MPM-PV-22844, proximal right radioulna; MPM-PV-22845, left proximal end of tibiofibula; MPM-PV-22846, proximal half of urostyle.	A calyptocephalellid frog	Extant specimen of C. gayi
Calyptocephalella	C. sp.	Magallanodon Site	maxillae MPM-PV-22841 and MPM-PV-22842; ilium MPM-PV-22843	A species very small in size, distinct from C. gayi.	Extant specimen of C. gayi
Calyptocephalellidae indet.	Indeterminate	Locality 4	MPM 21519, distal end of right humerus with eroded distal margin		
Pipoidea indet.	Indeterminate	Locality 2	Distal end of right humerus	Resembles, yet is different from, Xenopus	

=== Plesiosaurs ===
Genus	Species	Locality	Material	Notes	Images
Elasmosauridae indet.	Indeterminate	Locality 5	Incomplete cervical centrum and the lateral half of a very fragmentary dorsal vertebra	May belong to the Calafate Formation	

=== Lepidosaurs ===
Color key: Taxon / Reclassified taxon / Taxon falsely reported as present / Dubious taxon or junior synonym / Ichnotaxon / Ootaxon / Morphotaxon

Notes
Uncertain or tentative taxa are in small text
~~crossed out~~ taxa are discredited.

==== Mosasaurs ====
Genus	Species	Locality	Material	Notes	Images
Mosasauridae indet.	Indeterminate	Locality 5	Seven teeth	Its presence suggest marine influences	

==== Rhynchocephalians ====
Genus	Species	Locality	Material	Notes	Images
Notosphenos	N. finisterre	Monotreme site	Fragmentary jawbone with two complete teeth and one partial tooth	A sphenodontid rhynchocephalian	Alternate interpretations of the holotype

==== Snakes ====
Genus	Species	Locality	Material	Notes	Images
Alethinophidia indet.	Indeterminate	Locality 4	MPM 21522, a vertebra		
Anilioidea indet.	Indeterminate	Locality 2	MPM-PV-22847, a vertebra		
Coniophiidae indet.	Indeterminate	Monotreme site	Two partial vertebrae	Shares some features with Coniophis	
Madtsoiidae indet.	Indeterminate	Monotreme site; Green Valley site	Two partial vertebrae		
Rionegrophis	R. madtsoioides	Locality 2	A partial vertebra	A madtsoiid snake	

=== Turtles ===
Genus	Species	Locality	Material	Notes	Images
Chelidae indet.	Indeterminate	Locality 2	Shell fragments (two peripheral and one costal plates)	Largest plates suggest a maximum carapace length of 40 cm.	
Hydromedusinae indet.	Indeterminate	Localities 2, 4, 5	Shell fragments (left peripheral 3 or 4, bridge peripherals, right hypoplastron, buttress, and plastral fragment)	Similar to Hydromedusa	Modern Hydromedusa
Meiolaniformes indet.	Indeterminate	Locality 4	Distal end of a left humerus	Southernmost record for the clade in South America	

=== Archosaurs ===
==== Crocodylomorphs ====
Genus	Species	Locality	Material	Notes	Images
Kostensuchus	K. atrox	Estancia La Anita	Skull, jaws, and incomplete postcranial skeleton	A large-bodied peirosaurid	

==== Ornithischians ====
Genus	Species	Locality	Material	Notes	Images
Hadrosauridae indet.	Indeterminate	La Anita Farm	Two incomplete caudal centra		
Isasicursor	I. santacrucensis	Locality 5	Multiple specimens, including teeth, several vertebrae, shoulder blades, and limbs	An elasmarian ornithopod	
Ornithopoda indet.	Indeterminate	La Anita Farm	Proximal end of a femur	A small ornithopod	
Parankylosauria indet.	Indeterminate	La Anita Farm	Five fragmentary caudal vertebrae, incomplete ribs, two incomplete humeri, and nine osteoderms		

==== Sauropods ====
Genus	Species	Locality	Material	Notes	Images
Fusioolithus	F. sp.	Locality 2, Puma cave, or Locality 4	Eggshells	Fusioolithidae ootaxon	
Lithostrotia indet.	Indeterminate	Río Leona	MACN 5205 (3 middle–posterior caudal centra)		
Nullotitan	N. glaciaris	Estancia Alta Vista, Localities 1, 2, 4, and 5	A partial skeleton consisting of a third cervical vertebra, tail vertebrae, a neck rib, ribs, a left shoulder blade, the ends of a right thigh bone, a right shin, a right calf bone, and a right ankle bone	A lithostrotian titanosaur	
Titanosauria indet.	Indeterminate	Locality 2 and 4	Seven isolated teeth		

==== Theropods ====
Genus	Species	Locality	Material	Notes
Enantiornithes indet.	Indeterminate	Locality 2, and 4	Distal fragment of a pedal phalanx and two isolated ungual pedal phalanges	
Kank	K. australis	Monotreme site	Fragmentary remains, including vertebrae, teeth, and pedal phalanges	An unenlagiid theropod
Kookne	K. yeutensis	Locality 2	An incomplete right coracoid, lacking the sternal end and the proximal end damaged	An ornithuran bird similar to Anseriformes
Maip	M. macrothorax	La Anita Farm	Axis, several dorsal and caudal vertebrae, cervical and dorsal ribs, gastralia, a left coracoid, fragmentary scapula, partial right pubis, and partial metatarsal	A large megaraptorid theropod
Megaraptoridae indet.	Indeterminate	La Anita Farm	Isolated teeth	
Noasauridae indet.	Indeterminate	Locality 4	Isolated right pedal phalanx IV-2?	Similar to Velocisaurus and Vespersaurus
Prismatoolithidae indet.	Indeterminate	Locality 4	Eggshells	Theropod eggshells
Yatenavis	Y. ieujensis	Estancia La Anita	Distal right humerus	An enantiornithean bird

=== Mammals ===
Genus	Species	Locality	Material	Notes	Images
Magallanodon	M. baikashkenke	Río de Las Chinas Valley and La Anita Farm	Tentative first upper molariform, anterior end of a left dentary bearing part of its gliriform incisor, and upper mesial incisor from the right side	A ferugliotheriid gondwanathere	
Magallanodon	M. terrwerr	Locality 2	MPM-PV-23088, isolated right lower molariform; MPM-PV-23089, isolated right lower molariform	A ferugliotheriid gondwanathere	
Mammalia indet.	Indeterminate	Locality 4	Two isolated caudal vertebrae	Characters shared with mammals include having a long and gracile tail	
Meridiolestida indet.	Indeterminate	Monotreme site	MPM-PV-21707, two fragments of a right dentary	Small taxon similar to Reigitherium	
Mesungulatoidea indet.	Indeterminate	La Anita Farm	MPM-PV-21708, fragment of left dentary with five alveoli corresponding with three teeth.	Larger than any known Mesozoic meridiolestidan	
Orretherium	O. tzei	Monotreme site	MPM-PV-23514, left upper second molariform.	A member of Meridiolestida belonging to the family Mesungulatidae	
Patagorhynchus	P. pascuali	Monotreme site	Lower right molar attached to a fragment of the dentary	A ornithorhynchid monotreme	
Patagomaia	P. chainko	La Anita Farm	Partial left acetabulum and ischium; MPM-PV-23515, one fragment of thoracic vertebra, posterior half of one caudal vertebra and 38 indeterminate bones.	A large therian or gondwanathere similar to Adalatherium	

== Flora ==
Color key: Taxon / Reclassified taxon / Taxon falsely reported as present / Dubious taxon or junior synonym / Ichnotaxon / Ootaxon / Morphotaxon

Notes
Uncertain or tentative taxa are in small text
~~crossed out~~ taxa are discredited.

=== Algae ===
Genus	Species	Affinity / Family	Image
Botryococcus	B. sp.	Botryococcaceae	
Cymatiosphaera	C. sp.	Zygnemataceae	
Leiosphaeridia	L. sp.	Zygnemataceae	
Ovoidites	O. parvus	Zygnemataceae	
Ovoidites	O. spriggii	Zygnemataceae	
Schizosporis	S. reticulatus	Zygnemataceae (aff. Spirogyra)	
Sphaeroplea	S. striatocristata	Sphaeropleaceae	

=== Liverworts ===
Genus	Species	Affinity / Family	Image
Aequitriradites	A. spinulosus	Marchantiidae	
Stoverisporites	S. microverrucatus	Marchantiidae	
Taurocusporites	T. segmentatus	Marchantiidae	
Triporoletes	T. reticulatus	Marchantiidae	
Triporoletes	T. sp.	Marchantiidae	

=== Hornworts ===
Genus	Species	Affinity / Family	Image
Foraminisporis	F. wonthaggiensis	Anthocerotidae	
Foraminisporis	F. sp.	Anthocerotidae	

=== Lycopods ===
Genus	Species	Affinity / Family	Image
Camarozonosporites	C. ambigens	Selaginellales	
Ceratosporites	C. equalis	Selaginellales	
Densoisporites	D. velatus	Selaginellales	
Foveosporites	F. sp.	Selaginellales	
Retitriletes	R. austroclavatidites	Lycopodiales	
Retitriletes	R. sp. cf. R. douglasii	Lycopodiales	

=== Ferns ===
Genus	Species	Affinity / Family	Image
Azolla	A. cf. andreisii	Salviniaceae	
Azolla	A. sp.	Salviniaceae	
Baculatisporites	B. comaumensis	Osmundaceae	
Baculatisporites	B. kachaikensis	Osmundaceae	
Baculatisporites	B. turbioensis	Osmundaceae	
cf. Cladophlebis	C. sp.	Polypodiopsida	
Clavifera	C. sp.	Gleicheniaceae	
Cyatheacidites	C. annulatus	Dicksoniaceae (aff. Lophosoria)	
Cyathidites	C. australis	Cyatheaceae	
Cyathidites	C. minor	Cyatheaceae	
Cyathidites	C. rafaeli	Cyatheaceae	
Dictyophyllidites	D. sp. cf. D. concavus	Dipteridaceae / Matoniaceae	
Gleicheniidites	G. sp.	Gleicheniaceae	
Leptolepidites	L. verrucatus	Blechnaceae	
Ornamentifera	O. sp.	Gleicheniaceae	
Osmundacidites	O. diazii	Osmundaceae	
Peromonolites	P. vellosus	Blechnaceae	

=== Non-conifer seed plants ===
Genus	Species	Affinity / Family	Image
Cycadopites	C. follicularis	Cycadales, Bennettitales, or Ginkgoales	
Ephedripites	E. ambiguous	Ephedrales	
Equisetosporites	E. notensis	Ephedrales	
Equisetosporites	E. sp. cf. E. dudarensis	Ephedrales	
Vitreisporites	V. signatus	Pteridosperms	

=== Conifers ===
Genus	Species	Affinity / Family	Image
Araucariacites	A. australis	Araucariaceae	
Callialasporites	C. turbatus	Araucariaceae	
Classopollis	C. sp.	Cheirolepidiaceae	
Cyclusphaera	C. psilata	Araucariaceae	
Dacrycarpites	D. australiensis	Podocarpaceae	
Dilwynites	D. tuberculatus	Araucariaceae	
Gamerroites	G. psilasaccus	Podocarpaceae	
Lygistepollenites	L. florinii	Podocarpaceae	
Microcachryidites	M. antarcticus	Podocarpaceae (aff. Microcachrys)	Microcachrys
Peripollenites	P. sp.	Cupressaceae	
Phyllocladidites	P. mawsonii	Podocarpaceae (aff. Lagarostrobos franklinii)	Lagarostrobos
Podocarpidites	P. elegans	Podocarpaceae	
Podocarpidites	P. elipticus	Podocarpaceae	
Podocarpidites	P. exiguus	Podocarpaceae	
Podocarpidites	P. herbstii	Podocarpaceae	
Podocarpidites	P. major	Podocarpaceae	
Podocarpidites	P. marwikii	Podocarpaceae	
Podocarpidites	P. otagoensis	Podocarpaceae	
Podocarpidites	P. sp. cf. P. langii	Podocarpaceae	
Podocarpidites	P. sp. cf. P. microreticuloidata	Podocarpaceae	
Podocarpidites	P. torquatus	Podocarpaceae	
Podocarpidites	P. verrucosus	Podocarpaceae	
Podocarpoxylon	P. dusenii	Podocarpaceae	
Trichotomosulcites	T. subgranulatus	Podocarpaceae	

=== Magnoliids ===
Genus	Species	Affinity / Family	Image
Clavatimonocolpites	C. sp.	Magnoliids	

=== Monocots ===
Genus	Species	Affinity / Family	Image
Arecipites	A. minutiscabratus	Arecaceae	
Arecipites	A. sp. cf. A. subverrucatus	Arecaceae	
Aff.Eolirion	"Morphotype 5"	Palmae	
Longapertites	L. proxapertitoides	Arecaceae	
Liliacidites	L. lanceolatus	Liliales (aff. Lilium)	Lilium
Liliacidites	L. variegatus	Liliales (aff. Lilium)	Lilium
Liliacidites	L. vermireticulatus	Liliales	Lilium
Liliacidites	L. sp. cf. L. kaitangataensis	Liliaceae/Amaryllidaceae	
Monocotyledonean	"Morphotype 6"	Monocots	
Nuphar	N.? sp. 1	Nymphaeaceae	Extant specimen
Nuphar	N.? sp. 2	Nymphaeaceae	Extant specimen
Palmoxylon	P. kospi	Arecoideae	Arecoideae
Palmoxylon	P. anciborae	Trachycarpeae (Aff. Chamaerops and Trachycarpus)	Chamaerops
Pandaniidites	P. typicus	Araceae	
Proxapertites	P. operculatus	Araceae	
Spinozonocolpites	S. hialinus	Arecaceae	

=== Eudicots ===
Genus	Species	Affinity / Family	Image
Beauprea	B. elegansiformis	Proteales	Beauprea drawing
Aff. Brachychiton	"Morphotype 4"	Malvaceae	Extant specimen
Buttinia	B. andreevii	Buxales	
Clavamonocolpites	C. sp.	?Chloranthaceae	
Coccoloba?	"Morphotype 1"	Polygonaceae	Extant specimen
Constantinisporis	C. jacquei	?Chloranthaceae	
Dicotetradites	D. sp.	Ericales	
Diporites	D. sp.	?Chloranthaceae	
Doyleipollenites	D. sp.	?Chloranthaceae	
Ericipites	E. scabratus	Ericales	
Eudicots	"Morphotype 3"	Eudicots	
Myrtaceidites	M. sp. cf. M. mesonesus	Myrtales	
Nothofagidites	N. saraensis	Nothofagaceae (cf. Nothofagus)	Nothofagus
Nyssapollenites	N. sp.	?Chloranthaceae	
Peninsulapollis	P. gillii	Proteaceae (cf. Beauprea?)	
Peninsulapollis	P. truswelliae	Proteaceae (cf. Beauprea?)	
Polycolpites	P. sp.	Pedaliaceae (?cf. Josephinia)	
Proteacidites	P. parvus	Proteaceae (cf. Bellendena montana)	Bellendena
Proteacidites	P. subscabratus	Proteaceae	
Proteacidites	P. sp. cf. P. tenuiexinus	Proteaceae	
Proteacidites	P. sp.	Proteaceae	
Psilatricolporites	P. sp. cf. P. complanatius	Tetrameristaceae	
Psilatricolporites	P. sp.	Tetrameristaceae	
Retidiporites	R. camachoi	Proteaceae	
Rhoipites	R. baculatus	Ericales	
Rhoipites	R. minusculus	Ericales	
Rhoipites	R. sp. cf. R. alveolatus	Ericales	
Rhoipites	R. sp. 1	Ericales	
Rhoipites	R. sp. 2	Ericales	
Rousea	R. patagonica	Ericales	
Rousea	R. sp. cf. R. minuscula	Ericales	
Rousea	R. sp.	Ericales	
Syncolporites	S. sp.	Ericales	
Tetracolpites	T. sp.	?Chloranthaceae	
Triatriopollenites	T. lateflexus	Proteaceae	
Tricesticillus	T. americanus	?Chloranthaceae	
Tricolpites	T. reticulatus	Gunneraceae (Gunnera macrophylla)	Gunnera
Tricolpites	T. sp. cf. T. brevicolpus	Gunneraceae	
Tricolpites	T. sp. cf. T. inargutus	Gunneraceae	
Tricolpites	T. sp. cf. T. lumbrerensis	Gunneraceae	
Tricolpites	T. sp. 1	Ranunculaceae (cf. Clematis)	Clematis
Tricolporites	T. sp. 2	Ericales	
Tricolporites	T. sp. 3	Ericales	
Tricolporoidites	T. sp. cf. T. eximius	Ericales	
Triorites	T. sp. cf. T. minusculus	?Chloranthaceae	
Tubulifloridites	T. lilliei	Ericales	
Volkheimerites	V. labyrinthus	?Chloranthaceae	

== See also ==
- Dorotea Formation
- Lists of dinosaur-bearing stratigraphic units
- List of fossiliferous stratigraphic units in Antarctica
- López de Bertodano Formation
- Snow Hill Island Formation
- Sobral Formation
- South Polar region of the Cretaceous
