= K. australis =

K. australis may refer to:

- Kank australis, an unenlagiid dinosaur from Late Cretaceous Argentina.
- Kingia australis, a plant species
- Kritosaurus australis, an hadrosaurid (duckbilled) dinosaur species that lived about 73 million years ago, in the Late Cretaceous of South America

== See also ==
- Australis (disambiguation)
