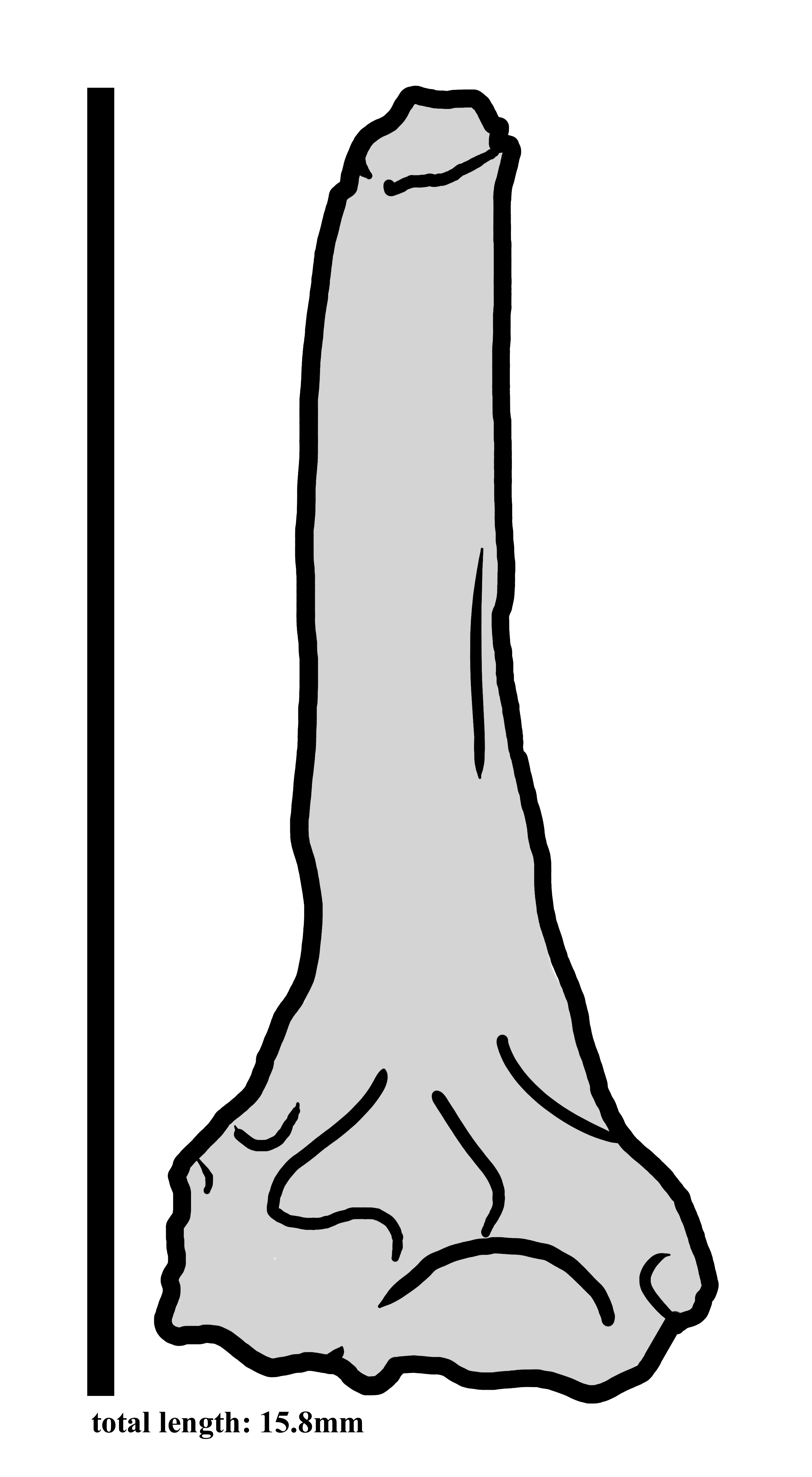
- Holotype humerus

Scientific classification
- Kingdom: Animalia
- Phylum: Chordata
- Class: Reptilia
- Clade: Dinosauria
- Clade: Saurischia
- Clade: Theropoda
- Clade: Avialae
- Clade: †Enantiornithes
- Genus: †Yatenavis; Herrera et al., 2022
- Species: †Y. ieujensis

Binomial name
- †Yatenavis ieujensis Herrera et al., 2022

= Yatenavis =

Yatenavis Temporal range: Late Cretaceous, Maastrichtian

Extinct bird genus

Yatenavis (lit. 'stone bird') is an extinct genus of enantiornithean bird from the Late Cretaceous (Maastrichtian age) Chorrillo Formation of Santa Cruz Province, Argentina. The genus contains a single species, Yatenavis ieujensis, known from a partial humerus.

== Discovery and naming ==
Y. ieujensis type locality in Santa Cruz Province, Argentina

The Yatenavis ieujensis holotype specimen, MPM-PV-23086, was discovered in sediments of the Chorrillo Formation at La Anita Farm near El Calafate in Santa Cruz Province, Argentina. This specimen consists of the distal (lower) portion of the right humerus.

In 2022, Herrera et al. described Yatenavis ieujensis, a new genus and species of enantiornithean, based on these fossil remains. The generic name, Yatenavis, combines the Aonikenk word for "stone" with the Latin word "avis", meaning "bird". The specific name, ieujensis, is derived from "ieuj", the Aonikenk word for "snow". Yatenavis represents the eighth enantiornithean named from South America.

== Description ==
Herrera et al. (2022) concluded that Yatenavis would have had a body size comparable to extant sparrows. The fossil material bears similar features to Late Cretaceous enantiornithines from various locations across the world, including Madagascar, North America, Patagonia, and Central Asia.

== Paleoecology ==
Yatenavis represents the southernmost record of an enantiornithean. As they are uncommon in high-latitude environments (which were more frequently inhabited by ornithurines), the discovery of Yatenavis in the Chorrillo Formation is surprising. Yatenavis coexisted with the ornithurine Kookne and a large indeterminate enantiornithine. Non-avian dinosaurs, including the elasmarian ornithopod Isasicursor, the titanosaurian Nullotitan, and the megaraptorid Maip, have also been named from the Chorrillo Formation.
