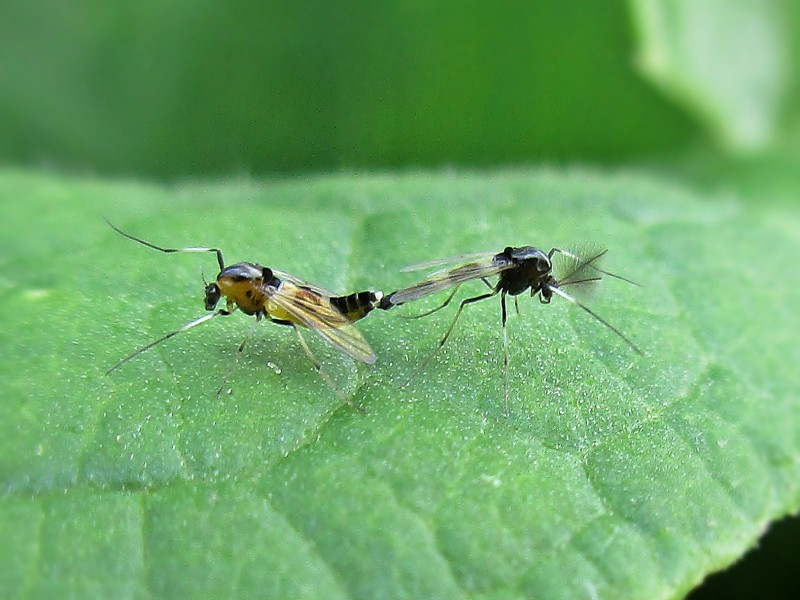
- Cricotopus bicinctus Netherlands

Scientific classification
- Kingdom: Animalia
- Phylum: Arthropoda
- Class: Insecta
- Order: Diptera
- Family: Chironomidae
- Genus: Cricotopus
- Species: C. bicinctus

Binomial name
- Cricotopus bicinctus (Meigen, 1818)

= Cricotopus bicinctus =

Species of fly

Cricotopus bicinctus is a species of fly in the family Chironomidae. It is found in the Palearctic.
