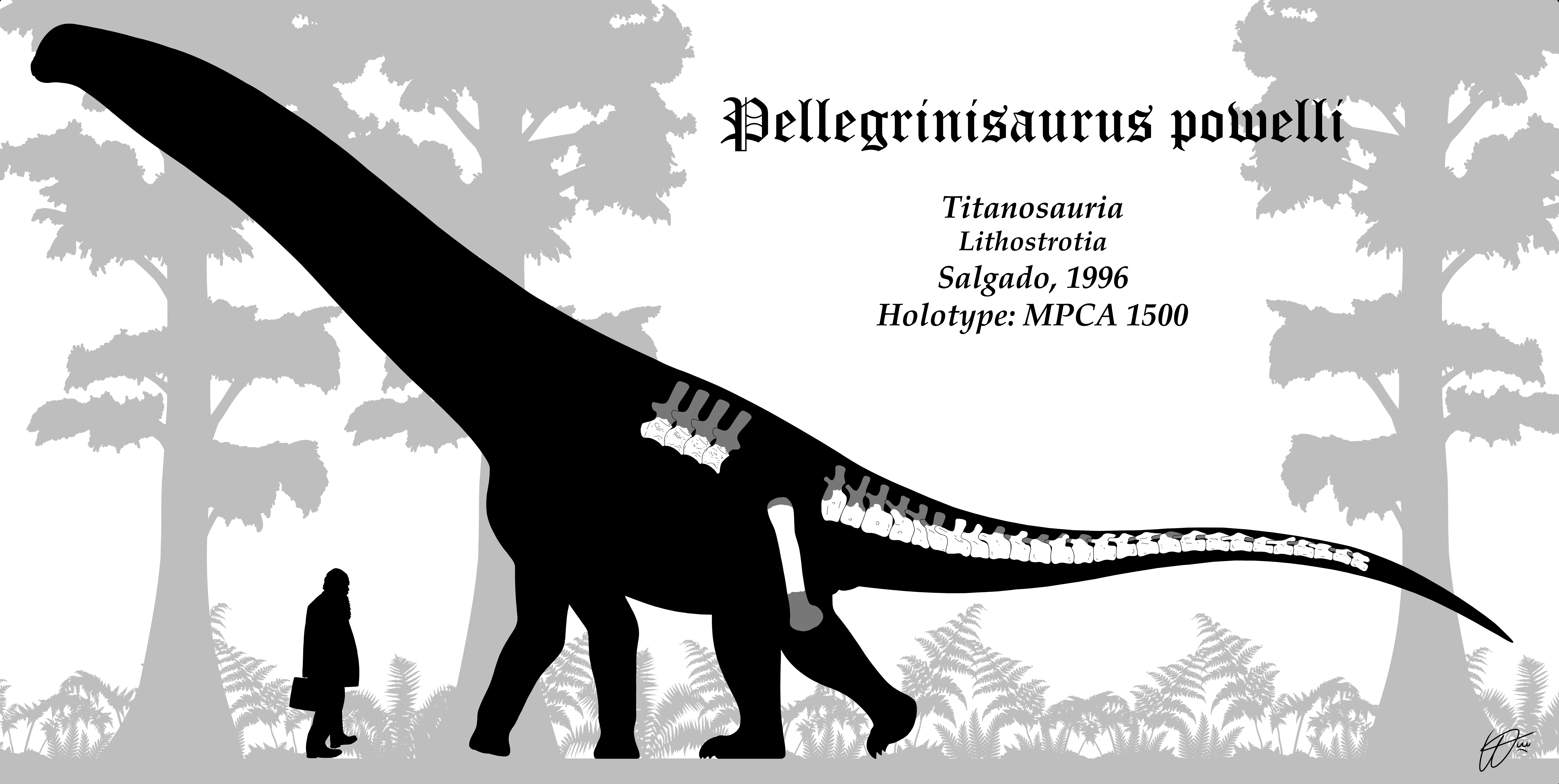
- Diagram showing known fragments from the holotype

Scientific classification
- Kingdom: Animalia
- Phylum: Chordata
- Class: Reptilia
- Clade: Dinosauria
- Clade: Saurischia
- Clade: †Sauropodomorpha
- Clade: †Sauropoda
- Clade: †Macronaria
- Clade: †Titanosauria
- Family: †Saltasauridae
- Subfamily: †Opisthocoelicaudiinae
- Genus: †Pellegrinisaurus; Salgado, 1996

Type species
- †Pellegrinisaurus powelli Salgado, 1996

= Pellegrinisaurus =

Pellegrinisaurus Temporal range: Late Cretaceous, Campanian–Maastrichtian

Extinct genus of dinosaurs

Pellegrinisaurus (meaning Lizard from Pelligrini) is a genus of titanosaurian sauropod dinosaur that lived in South America during the Late Cretaceous period. The holotype was found in the Allen Formation, Argentina.

== Discovery and naming ==
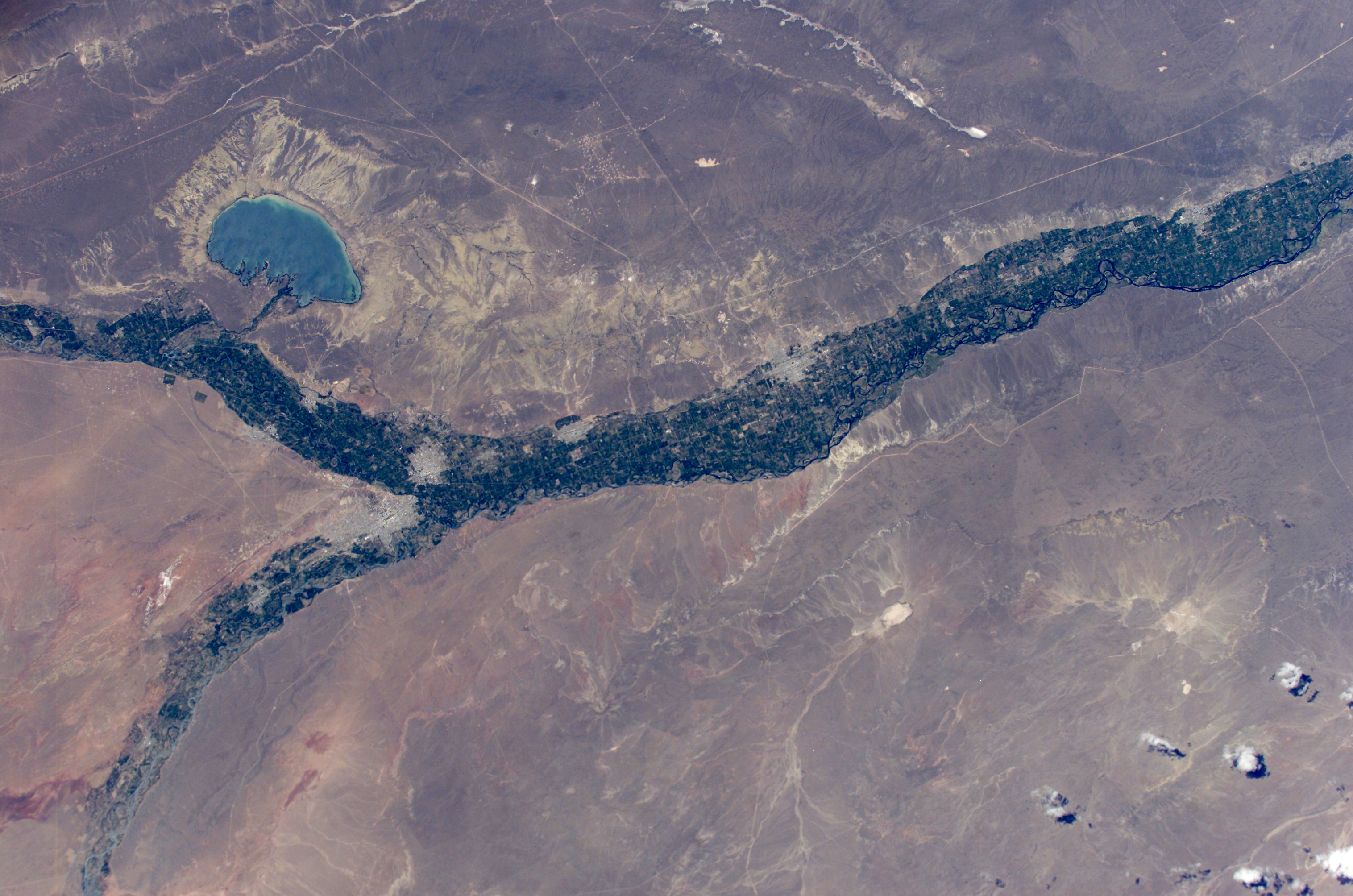
Locality of Pellegrini Lake

The assigned holotype, MPCA 1500, was discovered in 1975 by Roberto Abel and his assistant Jaime Emilio Powell. It was recovered from the lower member of the Allen Formation in the locality of Pellegrini Lake, Argentina, dating from the Late Cretaceous, Campanian to lower Maastrichtian, but it was not formally described until 1996 by Leonardo Salgado. Initially, the recovered remains were referred to Epachthosaurus, but later this hypothesis was abandoned because MPCA 1500 did not share derived features with the holotype of Epachthosaurus. The generic name Pellegrinisaurus refers to Pellegrini Lake, where the specimen was found. The specific name powelli is in honour of Jaime E. Powell.

== Description ==
Pellegrinisaurus is a rather large titanosaur. It is estimated to have measured 20–25 metres (66–82 ft) long and weighed 50 metric tons (55 short tons). The holotype includes an incomplete right femur, twenty-six caudal and four dorsal vertebrae. Autapomorphic features of Pellegrinisaurus, by which it can be distinguished, are:

- The ventral side of the centrum of the dorsals has a transverse width equal to twice the dorsoventral (vertical) depth.
- The mid-posterior and posterior caudals are anteroposteriorly (horizontally) elongated and have dorsoventrally depressed neural spines, the anterior ends of which are higher anteriorly than posteriorly.

Pellegrinisaurus differs from other titanosaurs by having anteroposteriorly elongate and dorsoventrally depressed mid-posterior and posterior caudal spines; Salgado interpreted this condition as an extra-articulation between the neural spine and the articular process of the subsequent vertebra, that reduced tail movement.

The right femur is partially preserved. It is anteroposteriously compressed with a very flattened fourth trochanter. Laterally, it features a pronounced bulge similar to that of Chubutisaurus, brachiosaurids and other titanosaurs.

== Paleoecology ==
Pellegrinisaurus was unearthed from the Allen Formation, in which it probably lived alongside other titanosaurs, such as Aeolosaurus and Rocasaurus. Salgado suggested that contemporaneous hadrosaurids and the titanosaur Aeolosaurus inhabited coastal lowlands while other larger titanosaurs (such as Pellegrinisaurus) and theropods inhabited interior environments of the region.

== Classification ==
Pellegrinisaurus is a lithostrotian titanosaur, closely related to the North American genus Alamosaurus, forming a clade that may also include Dreadnoughtus, Nullotitan, Baurutitan, and Baurutitan's possible synonym Trigonosaurus. The clade containing Alamosaurus and Pellegrinisaurus has variously been found to either be closely related to, but outside, Saltasauridae, or as a member of Saltasauridae, within Opisthocoelicaudiinae. Alamosaurus and Pellegrinisaurus have also been considered possible members of Saltasaurinae, as Salgado originally proposed for Pellegrinisaurus when he named it.

- Lithostrotia
  - - Malawisaurus
    - Diamantinasaurus
  - - - Tapuiasaurus
      - - Rapetosaurus
        - Isisaurus
    - - Nullotitan
      - - Saltasauridae
        - - Baurutitan
          - - Pellegrinisaurus
            - - Alamosaurus
              - Trigonosaurus

Position of Pellegrinisaurus within Lithostrotia, as recovered by Cerda et al. 2021
