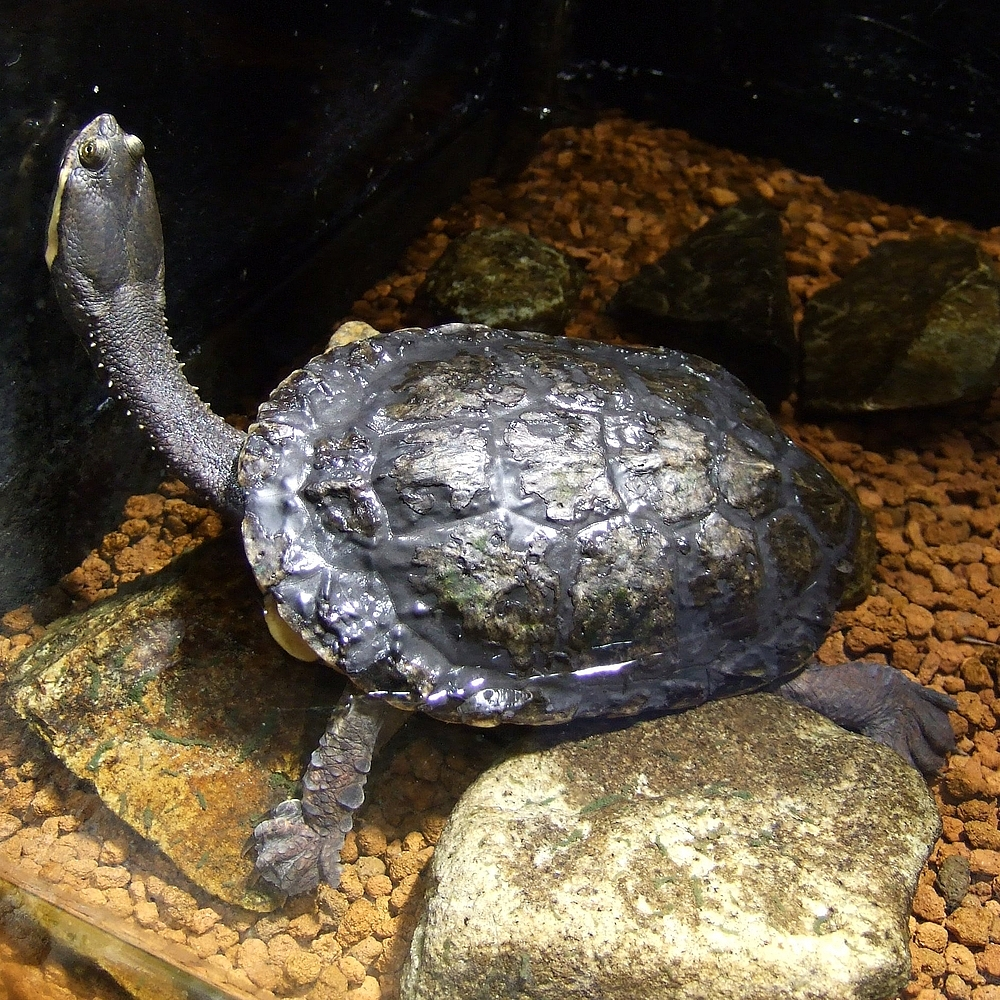
- Hydromedusa tectifera in an aquarium in Japan

Scientific classification
- Kingdom: Animalia
- Phylum: Chordata
- Class: Reptilia
- Order: Testudines
- Suborder: Pleurodira
- Family: Chelidae
- Genus: Hydromedusa
- Species: H. tectifera

Binomial name
- Hydromedusa tectifera Cope, 1869

Synonyms
- Hydromedusa tectifera Cope, 1870; Hydromedusa platanensis Gray, 1873; Hydromedusa wagleri Günther, 1884; Hydromedusa tectifara [sic] Nutaphand, 1979 (ex errore)

= Argentine snake-necked turtle =

Species of turtle

The Argentine snake-necked turtle (Hydromedusa tectifera), also known commonly as the South American snake-necked turtle is a species of turtle in the family Chelidae. The species is known for the long neck to which its common names refer. Despite appearances, the Argentine snake-necked turtle is probably more closely related to the mata mata (Chelus fimbriatus) than to the Australian snake-necked turtles in the genus Chelodina. H. tectifera is found in northern Argentina, Uruguay, Paraguay, and southern Brazil. Not much is known about it, as it has not been extensively researched. It is a popular pet in the exotic pet trade.

== Anatomy and morphology ==
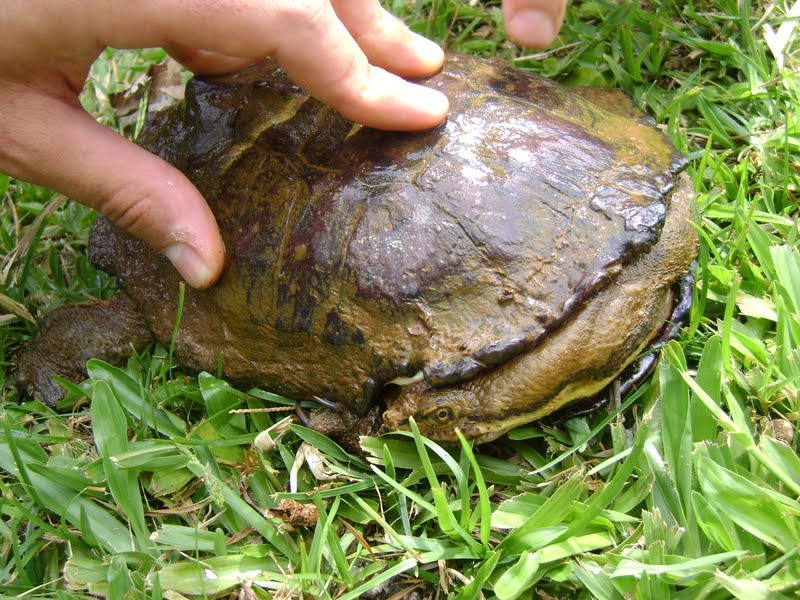
An Argentine snake-necked turtle caught by mistake on a fishing hook in Brazil.

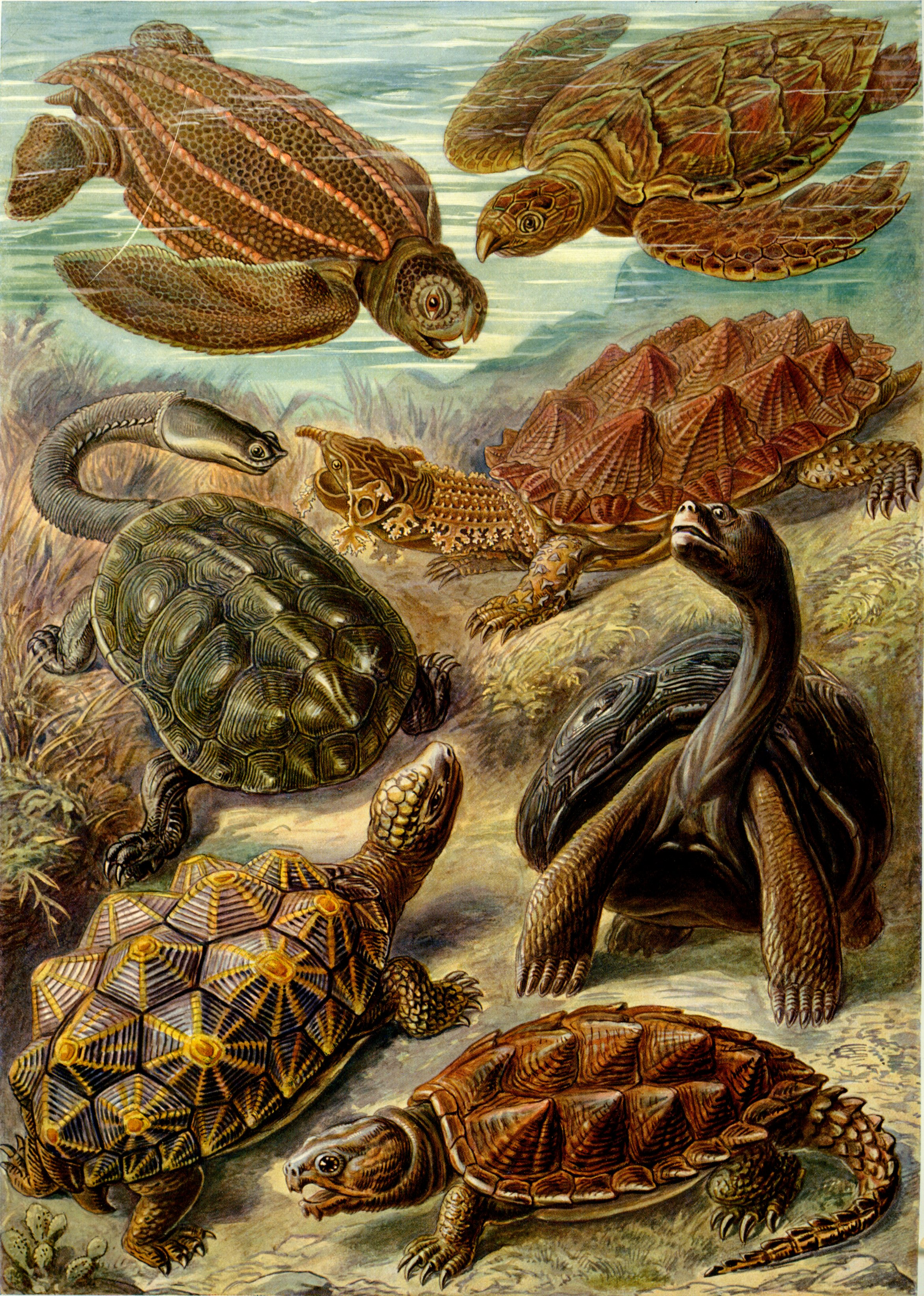
H. tectifera is in the middle left. To the right of it, face to face, is the mata mata (Chelus fimbriatus).

H. tectifera can reach up to 28 centimeters (11 inches) in straight carapace length. Its carapace is strongly keeled, and it can also be distinguished by black and yellowish markings along its head and neck. Generally, the females are larger than the males which often have larger tails.

== Natural history ==
The Argentine snake-necked turtle lives in slow-moving ponds, rivers, streams, and marshes, preferably with aquatic vegetation. In coastal areas, it will enter brackish water, and it may hibernate in colder areas of its distribution. It is carnivorous and eats snails, aquatic insects, fish, and amphibians. It attacks its prey with a combination of matamata-like vacuum suction and the stabbing neck motions of other snake-necked turtles. Courtship and mating has not been extensively observed in this species, although it is known that nesting occurs in the spring at the riverbanks. The eggs are 34 mm × 22 mm (1.34 in × 0.87 in), white, and brittle-shelled. Hatchlings have a straight carapace length of about 34 mm (1.3 in), and have a carapace which is more wrinkled than that of an adult.

== See also ==
- Turtles of South America
