= Kank =

Kank Temporal range: Late Cretaceous, Maastrichtian
- Referred right pedal ungual of digit II (MPM 21548-A) of Kank, in ventral (A and B), and medial (C-D) views. Scale bar: 10 cm.
- Isolated referred dorsal vertebra (MPM-PV-21546-A) left lateral (A), ventral (B), posterior (C), right lateral (D), dorsal (E) and anterior (F) views. Scale bar: 3 cm

Scientific classification
- Kingdom: Animalia
- Phylum: Chordata
- Class: Reptilia
- Clade: Dinosauria
- Clade: Saurischia
- Clade: Theropoda
- Family: †Unenlagiidae
- Genus: †Kank; Motta et al. 2026
- Species: †K. australis

Binomial name
- †Kank australis Motta et al. 2026

Extinct genus of paravian dinosaur

Kank is an extinct genus of unenlagiid paravian dinosaur known from the Late Cretaceous (Maastrichtian age) Chorrillo Formation of southwestern Patagonia, Argentina. The genus contains a single species, Kank australis, known from fragmentary remains.

== Discovery ==
Chorrillo Formation landscape, where Kank was discovered. Its current cold semi-arid climate contrasts with the forested, warm-temperate environment that existed in the area 70 million years ago.

The remains of Kank were uncovered from the Maastrichtian-aged Chorrillo Formation ('Monotreme site') located in southwestern Patagonia, Argentina. The holotype specimen is MPM-PV-23106-A, and consists of a single vertebra. Three pedal phalanges and five teeth were found in the same spot as the holotype. Several additional remains from this formation may belong to Kank, including a dorsal vertebral centrum originally identified as belonging to a megaraptoran, a pedal ungual (toe claw), and isolated teeth. The discovery of Kank makes it the first member of the family Unenlagiidae that has been recorded from the Chorrillo Formation, and is notable in uncovering the gap between members of this family from the northernmost parts of Patagonia, such as Austroraptor from the Allen Formation, and the possible unenlagiid Imperobator from the Snow Hill Island Formation of Antarctica.

The genus name "Kank" references the "elder Rhea" who, in Aonikenk mythology, created the constellation Choiols (the Southern Cross). The specific name "australis" is a Latin word meaning "from the south", referencing the geographic region of the species' discovery.

== Description ==
Life restoration of a pair of Kank wading through shallow waters. (Made by Sebastián Rozadilla co-author of Kank description)

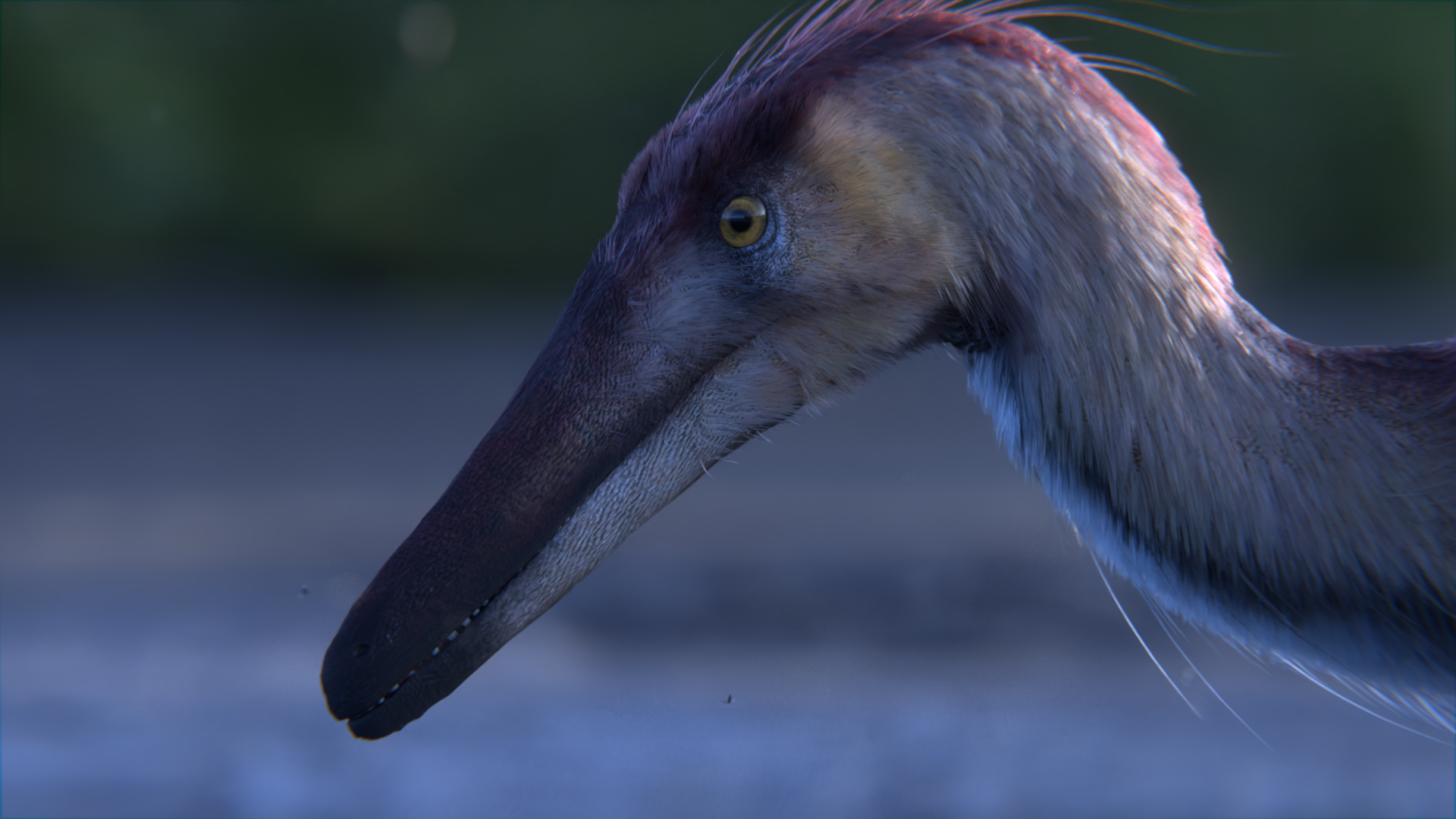
Portrait of K. australis

Kank is a medium-sized unenlagiid, with bones similar in size to Neuquenraptor. The mass of the latter has been estimated at 27 kilograms (60 lb).

The teeth of Kank are small, curved apically, and lack serrations. The maxillary teeth are straight and do not have lingual curvature. They also bear apicobasally oriented flutes surrounding lateral grooves and have no serrated carinae. Its dentary teeth have their mesial carinae restricted to the apical third of the crown as seen in Austroraptor. Similar to Buitreraptor, its maxillary teeth are labiolingually compressed when seen in cross-section.

== Paleoecology ==
The Chorrillo Formation from which Kank is known represents a predominantly wetland environment, which included both terrestrial and freshwater conditions, and its fossils have been found in association with numerous fish remains. Other dinosaurs from this formation include the megaraptorid Maip, the titanosaur Nullotitan, the elasmarian Isasicursor, and indeterminate fossils of parankylosaurs and noasaurids. Other fossil animals include the peirosaurid crocodylomorph Kostensuchus and mammals (the monotreme Patagorhynchus and the therian Patagomaia).
