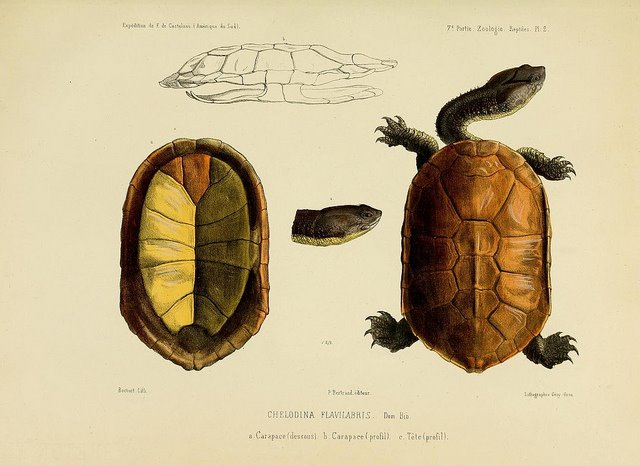

Conservation status
- Vulnerable (IUCN 3.1)

Scientific classification
- Kingdom: Animalia
- Phylum: Chordata
- Class: Reptilia
- Order: Testudines
- Suborder: Pleurodira
- Family: Chelidae
- Genus: Hydromedusa
- Species: H. maximiliani

Binomial name
- Hydromedusa maximiliani (Mikan, 1825)

Synonyms
- Emys maximiliani Mikan, 1825; Chelodina flavilabris A.M.C. Duméril & Bibron, 1835; Hydromedusa flavilabris — Gray, 1844; Hydromedusa subdepressa Gray, 1854; Hydromedusa depressa Gray, 1856; Hydromedusa bankae Giebel, 1866

= Brazilian snake-necked turtle =

Species of turtle

The Brazilian snake-necked turtle (Hydromedusa maximiliani), also known commonly as Maximilian's snake-necked turtle, and locally known in Brazilian Portuguese as cágado-da-serra ("mountain turtle") and cágado-pescoço-de-cobra ("snake-necked turtle"), is a species of turtle in the family Chelidae. The species is native to southeastern Brazil. It is one of the smallest Brazilian freshwater turtles, reaching a maximum straight carapace length of 20 cm (7.9 in). The species prefers streams with sandy and rocky bottoms and clear water in forests above 600 m (2,000 ft) elevation.

== Etymology ==
The specific name, maximiliani, is in honor of German naturalist Prince Maximilian of Wied-Neuwied.

== Taxonomy ==
First described as Emys maximiliani by Mikan (1825), it was subsequently moved to the genus Hydromedusa by Wagler (1830). Several other species described later have since been synonymized with this species. There are no recognised subspecies.

== Description ==
The Brazilian snake-necked turtle is a small species reaching a straight carapace length of between 10–20 cm (3.9–7.9 in) with a weight of 120–520 g (4.2–18.3 oz). The carapace of the adult is oval in shape varying in color from dark gray, through to dark or light brown. The plastron is a yellow or cream color. The species has a moderate-sized head with a small snout and yellowish jaws, with no barbels on the chin. The iris is black. The dorsal surface of the head, neck and limbs are olive green to gray in color with a lighter cream-colored ventral surface.

== Geographic distribution and habitat ==
The Brazilian snake-necked turtle is native to southeastern Brazil, in the states of Bahia, Minas Gerais, Espírito Santo, Rio de Janeiro and São Paulo. The distribution is associated with the mountainous Atlantic rainforest. As a generalization it is found in mountain streams above 600 m (2,000 ft).

The species is found in shallow streams from 15 to 100 cm (6–39 in) in depth, with clear, cold water and sandy or rocky substrates. Because of the dense canopy and closed understory of the forests the streams receive little sunlight making basking only possible in gaps along the stream.

== Reproduction ==
Hydromedusa maximiliani is oviparous, depositing eggs at terrestrial nesting sites.

== Conservation ==
Some populations of this species, H. maximiliani, occur within protected areas and are hence afforded some protection from deforestation and pollution which are considered major threats. In regions outside these protected areas the species may be becoming fragmented and may therefore become increasingly vulnerable in the future.
