= Cricotopus elegans =

Scientific classification
- Kingdom: Animalia
- Phylum: Arthropoda
- Clade: Pancrustacea
- Class: Insecta
- Order: Diptera
- Family: Chironomidae
- Genus: Cricotopus
- Species: C. elegans

Binomial name
- Cricotopus elegans Johannsen, 1943

Synonyms
- Cricotopus (Cricotopus) elegans

Species of insect

Cricotopus elegans is a species of non-biting midges in the subfamily Orthocladiinae of the bloodworm family Chironomidae. It is found in Europe.

It mines in the aquatic Potamogeton.
