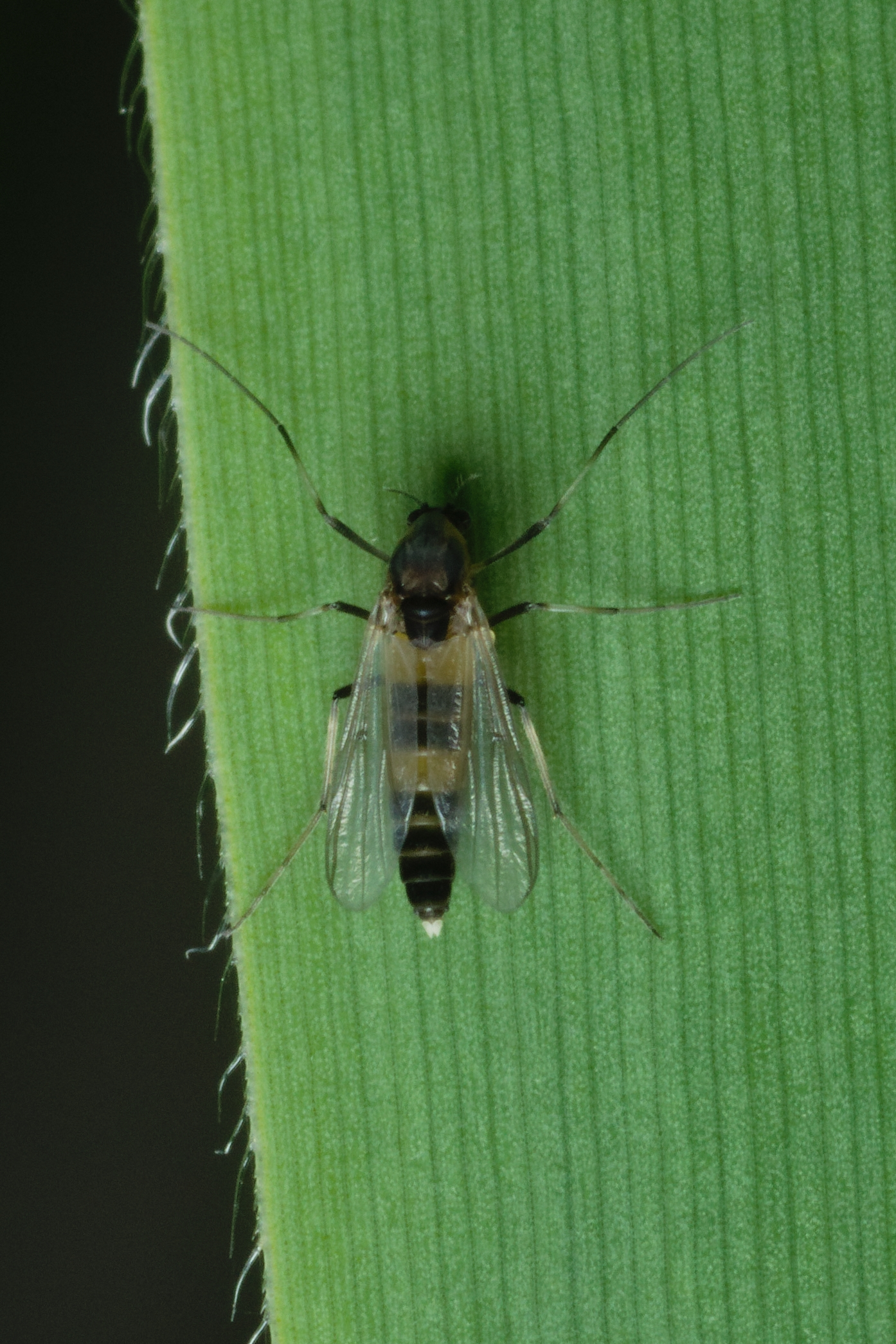
- Cricotopus sp. sylvestris group, female, Poland

Scientific classification
- Kingdom: Animalia
- Phylum: Arthropoda
- Class: Insecta
- Order: Diptera
- Family: Chironomidae
- Genus: Cricotopus
- Species: C. sylvestris

Binomial name
- Cricotopus sylvestris (Fabricius, 1794)

Synonyms
- Tipula sylvestris Fabricius, 1794

= Cricotopus sylvestris =

Species of fly

Cricotopus sylvestris formerly Cricotopus silvestris, is a species of midge in the family Chironomidae. It is found in Asia, Europe, The United Kingdom, and North America.

== Ecology ==
It is believed that the complete development of this species from larvae to adult is temperature dependent. In laboratory conditions, larvae completed development in 10 days at 22° and 29 °C. When temperatures were at 15°, it took 28 days. The production to biomass (P/B) ratio for this species has one of the highest values reported for chironomids. Midge larvae are often eaten by other invertebrates, such as damselfly naiads/Nymph (biology), and fish. In North America, it is noted that this species is a natural enemy of Berosus ingeminatus and Ischnura verticalis

== In the United Kingdom ==
In the U.K, this species is considered to be native but with a sporadic range.
