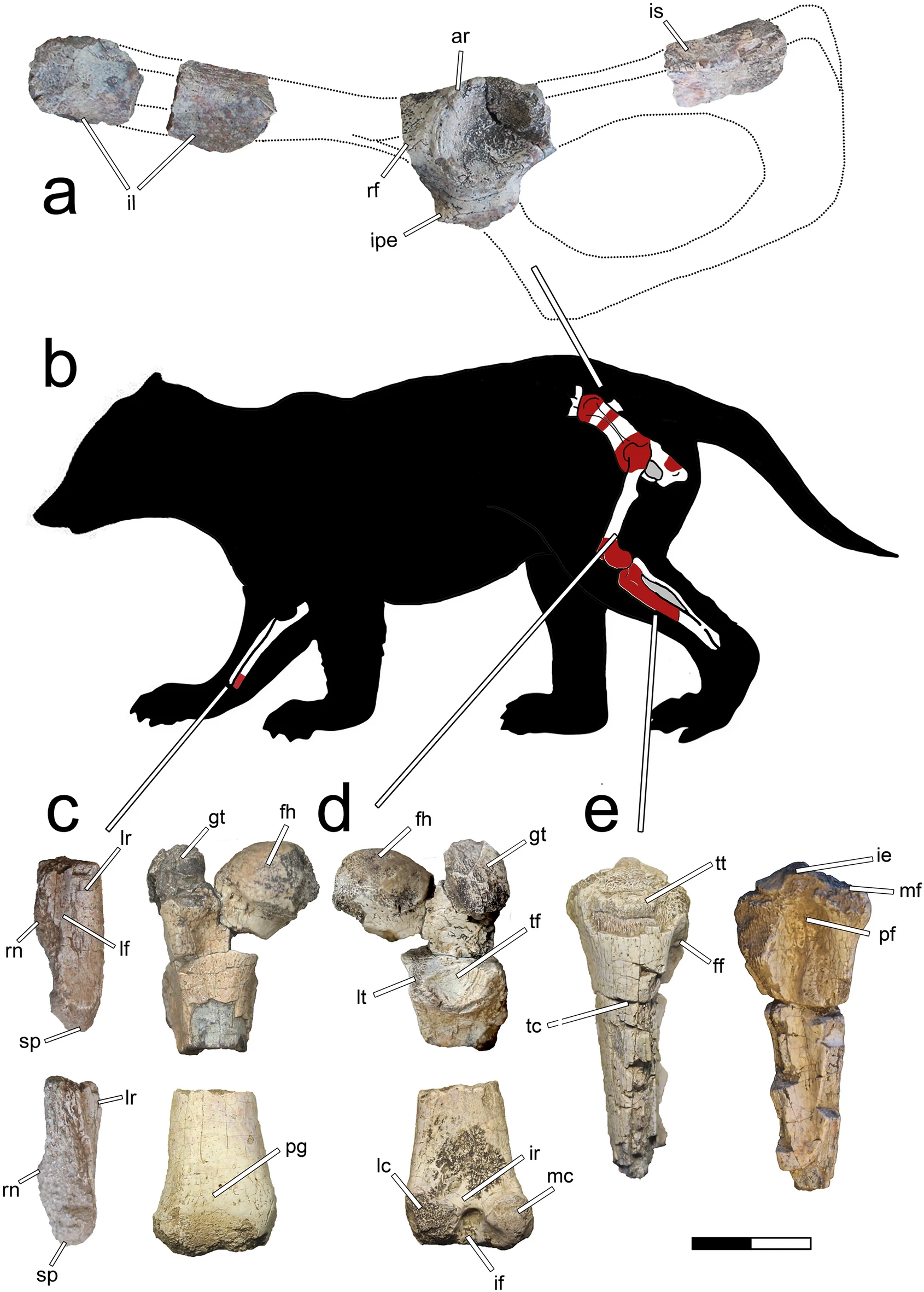
- Holotype specimen

Scientific classification
- Kingdom: Animalia
- Phylum: Chordata
- Class: Mammalia
- Subclass: Theria
- Genus: †Patagomaia
- Species: †P. chainko

Binomial name
- †Patagomaia chainko Chimento et al., 2024

= Patagomaia =

Patagomaia Temporal range: Late Cretaceous, Maastrichtian

Extinct genus of mammals

Patagomaia is an extinct mammal of uncertain affinities, originally described as a therian mammal, from the Maastrichtian Chorrillo Formation of Argentina. It is the largest Mesozoic mammal yet known, with weight estimates of around 14 kilograms (31 lb). The genus contains a single species, Patagomaia chainko, known from various fragmentary bones.

== Description ==
Patagomaia chainko was described in 2024 based on two specimens, the holotype specimen, MPM-PV-23365, comprising the distal end of the left ulna, two fragments of the preacetabular wing of the left ilium, acetabular region of the left hemipelvis, fragment of the ischial blade, proximal end of the right femur; distal end of the left femur, proximal end of the left tibia, and other indeterminate bone fragments, and a referred specimen, MPM-PV-23366, comprising a partial left acetabulum and ischium and part of the right femoral shaft. In 2025, Chimento et al. described an additional specimen, MPM-PV-23515, originating from the same site at which the holotype was found, likely belonging to that same individual. It includes a partial thoracic and caudal vertebra and 38 indeterminate bone pieces.

Using various regression equations, Chimento et al. (2024) estimated Patagomaia to weigh between 2.6 and 26 kilograms (5.7 and 57.3 lb), with an average estimate of 14 kg (31 lb). The lower end of that estimate is still large for a Mesozoic mammal, while the upper end would far exceed the estimated weight of any other. Among the other largest Mesozoic mammals are the Early Cretaceous eutriconodont Repenomamus from China and Late Cretaceous gondwanatherian Vintana from Madagascar, weighing around 10 kg (22 lb) and 8.9 kg (20 lb), respectively. As such, Patagomaia could represent the largest Mesozoic mammal currently known.

== Classification ==
Chimento et al. (2024) described Patagomaia as a therian mammal (the group including marsupials and placental mammals but not monotremes). However, it does not match any early Cenozoic South American therian group. Püschel et al. (2024) subsequently argued that Patagomaia might be a large gondwanatherian, possibly synonymous with Magallanodon, but Chimento, Agnolín & Novas (2024) did not consider their arguments to be conclusive in their published rebuttal.

== Palaeoecology ==
Patagomaia is known from the Chorrillo Formation, which has yielded several other mammal fossils, including the monotreme Patagorhynchus, the meridiolestidan Orretherium, and the gondwanathere Magallanodon. Various other animals have been found, including non-avian dinosaurs, birds, turtles, lepidosaurs, and fish.

=== Implications ===
Alongside Malagasy gondwanatheres like Adalatherium and Vintana and South American mesungulatid meridiolestidans, Patagomaia provides evidence that Late Cretaceous Gondwanan mammal faunas tended to achieve larger sizes than their northern counterparts.
