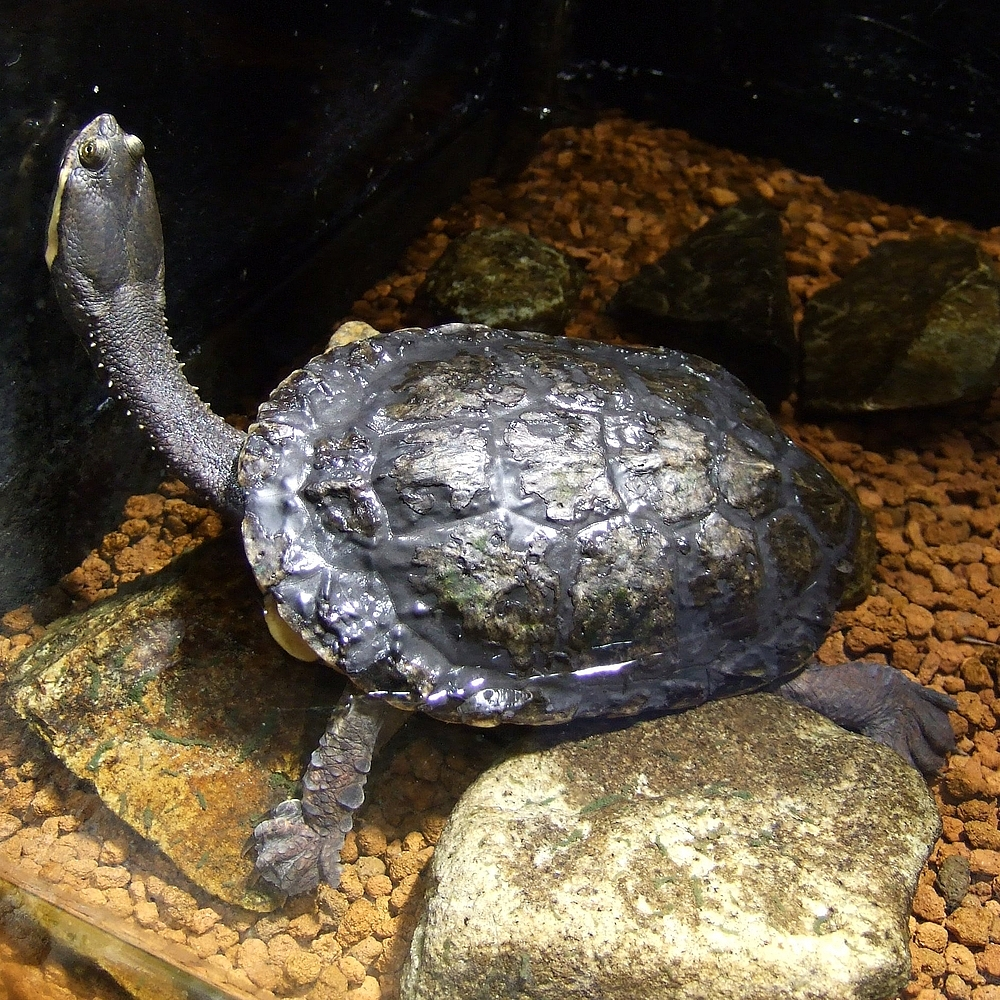
- Argentine snake-necked turtle, Hydromedusa tectifera

Scientific classification
- Kingdom: Animalia
- Phylum: Chordata
- Class: Reptilia
- Order: Testudines
- Suborder: Pleurodira
- Family: Chelidae
- Subfamily: Hydromedusinae
- Genus: Hydromedusa; Wagler 1830

= Hydromedusa =

Hydromedusa Temporal range: Paleocene-Recent ~62–0 Ma

Genus of turtles

Hydromedusa, commonly known as the South American snake-necked turtles, is a genus of turtles in the family Chelidae. They are quite closely related to the South American side-necked swamp turtles (Acanthochelys) and the snake-necked turtles of the Australian-Melanesian region (Chelodina), but less closely to the spine-necked river turtles of South America (Podocnemididae) which belong to a more modern lineage of Pleurodira.

== Species ==
This genus contains the following three species:

- †Hydromedusa casamayorensis de la Fuente & Bona, 2002 – Salamanca and Sarmiento Formations, Argentina
- Hydromedusa maximiliani (Mikan, 1820) – Brazilian snake-necked turtle
- Hydromedusa tectifera Cope, 1869 – Argentine snake-necked turtle
