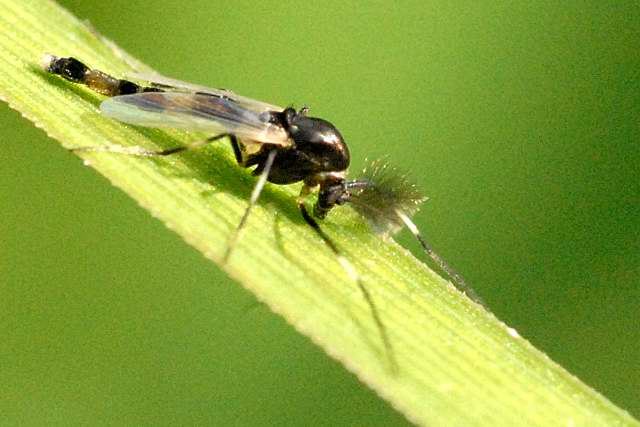
- Cricotopus trifasciatus

Scientific classification
- Kingdom: Animalia
- Phylum: Arthropoda
- Clade: Pancrustacea
- Class: Insecta
- Order: Diptera
- Family: Chironomidae
- Subfamily: Orthocladiinae
- Genus: Cricotopus van der Wulp, 1874

Species
- see text

= Cricotopus =

Genus of flies

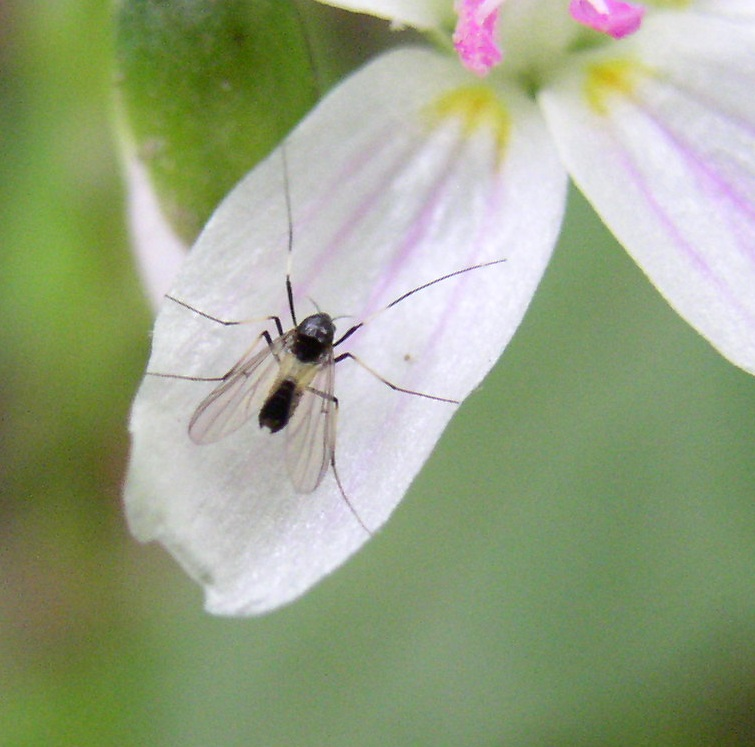
Cricotopus sp. on spring beauty

Cricotopus is a genus of non-biting midges in the subfamily Orthocladiinae of the bloodworm family Chironomidae.

== Species ==
- C. annulator Goetghebuer, 1927
- C. arcuatus Hirvenoja, 1973
- C. beckeri Hirvenoja, 1973
- C. bicinctus (Meigen, 1818)
- C. brevipalpis Kieffer, 1909
- C. caducus Hirvenoja, 1973
- C. coronatus Hirvenoja, 1973
- C. cumulatus Hirvenoja, 1973
- C. curtus Hirvenoja, 1973
- C. cylindraceus (Kieffer, 1908)
- C. debilis (Williston, 1896)
- C. dobroginus Albu, 1964
- C. draysoni Cranston & Krosch, 2015
- C. elegans Johannsen, 1943
- C. ephippium (Zetterstedt, 1838)
- C. festivellus (Kieffer, 1906)
- C. flavocinctus (Kieffer, 1924)
- C. fuscus (Kieffer, 1909)
- C. gelidus (Kieffer, 1922)
- C. glacialis Edwards, 1922
- C. guttatus Hirvenoja, 1973
- C. intersectus (Stæger, 1839)
- C. laetus Hirvenoja, 1973
- C. laricomalis Edwards, 1932
- C. lestralis (Edwards, 1924)
- C. levantinus Moubayed & Hirvenoja, 1986
- C. lygropis Edwards, 1929
- C. magus Hirvenoja, 1973
- C. maurii Spies & Sæther, 2004
- C. nevadensis Casas & Vilchez-Quero, 1992
- C. obnixus (Walker, 1856)
- C. obtusus Hirvenoja, 1973
- C. ornatus (Meigen, 1818)
- C. pallidipes Edwards, 1929
- C. patens Hirvenoja, 1973
- C. perniger (Zetterstedt, 1850)
- C. pilicauda Hirvenoja, 1973
- C. pilidorsum Hirvenoja, 1973
- C. pilitarsis (Zetterstedt, 1850)
- C. pilosellus Brundin, 1956
- C. pirifer Hirvenoja, 1973
- C. polaris Kieffer, 1926
- C. pulchripes Verrall, 1912
- C. reductus Hirvenoja, 1973
- C. relucens Hirvenoja, 1973
- C. reversus Hirvenoja, 1973
- C. septentrionalis Hirvenoja, 1973
- C. similis Goetghebuer, 1921
- C. slossonae Malloch, 1915
- C. speciosus Goetghebuer, 1921
- C. suspiciosus Hirvenoja, 1973
- C. sylvestris (Fabricius, 1794)
- C. tibialis (Meigen, 1804)
- C. tremulus (Linnaeus, 1758)
- C. triannulatus (Macquart, 1826)
- C. tricinctus (Meigen, 1818)
- C. trifascia Edwards, 1929
- C. trifasciatus (Meigen, 1810)
- C. tristis Hirvenoja, 1973
- C. vierriensis Goetghebuer, 1935
- C. villosus Hirvenoja, 1973
- C. zavreli Szadziewski & Hirvenoja, 1981
