= Magallanodon =

Magallanodon Temporal range: Late Campanian-early Maastrichtian ~72–68 Ma

Scientific classification
- Kingdom: Animalia
- Phylum: Chordata
- Class: Mammalia
- Family: †Ferugliotheriidae
- Genus: †Magallanodon; Goin et al., 2020
- Species: †M. baikashkenke

Binomial name
- †Magallanodon baikashkenke Goin et al., 2020

Extinct family of mammals

Magallanodon is a genus of large mammal from the extinct group Gondwanatheria. It contains a single species, Magallanodon baikashkenke. The species is the first Mesozoic mammal known from Chile, and is Late Cretaceous in age. It is known from individual teeth found in a quarry in the Río de Las Chinas Valley and La Anita Farm located in the Magallanes Basin in Patagonia. The fossils come from the Dorotea Formation and Chorrillo Formation, which is Late Campanian to Early Maastrichtian in age. It was more recently estimated to weigh ~10.34 kg.

== Etymology ==
The name Magallanodon comes from the Magallanes Region in southern Chile and odontos, Greek for tooth. The species name, M. baikashkenke is taken from the Tehuelchian words bai (grandfather) and kashkenke (valley) - Grandfather's Valley is the name for the region where the fossil was first found, also called the Río de Las Chinas.
