= Kookne =

Kookne Temporal range: Late Cretaceous, 70 Ma
- Right holotype coracoid in dorsal (A), lateral (B), ventral (C) and medial (D) views. (Scale bar: 1 cm)

Scientific classification
- Kingdom: Animalia
- Phylum: Chordata
- Class: Reptilia
- Clade: Dinosauria
- Clade: Saurischia
- Clade: Theropoda
- Clade: Avialae
- Clade: Ornithuromorpha
- Clade: Ornithurae
- Genus: †Kookne; Novas et al, 2019
- Species: †K. yeutensis

Binomial name
- †Kookne yeutensis Novas et al, 2019

Extinct genus of birds

Kookne is a prehistoric ornithuran genus from the Late Cretaceous. Known from a coracoid, the remains of the only known species Kookne yeutensis were found in rocks from the Late Cretaceous (Maastrichtian) Chorrillo Formation of Santa Cruz, Argentina.
